= Rick Nowels production discography =

This is a list of songwriting and production credits by Grammy-nominated American producer Rick Nowels.

== Rick Nowels production discography ==
Name of song, featured performers, originating album, year released and specified role.
Title	Year	Artist	Album	Songwriter	Producer			
Title	Year	Artist	Album	Songwriter	Primary	Secondary	Additional	Vocal
"Lydia!"	1981	Marty Balin	Balin	check				
"I Can't Wait"	1985	Stevie Nicks	Rock a Little	check	check			
"Sister Honey"	1985	Stevie Nicks	Rock a Little		check			
"The Nightmare"	1985	Stevie Nicks	Rock a Little		check			
"If I Were You"	1985	Stevie Nicks	Rock a Little	check	check			
"Has Anyone Ever Written Anything for You?"	1985	Stevie Nicks	Rock a Little		check			
"Just Lust"	1986	Joan Jett and the Blackhearts	Good Music	check				
"Bridges of Innocence"	1986	Maria Vidal	Maria Vidal		check			
"The Real Feel"	1986	Maria Vidal	Maria Vidal	check	check			
"I Am a Girl from Spain"	1986	Maria Vidal	Maria Vidal		check			
"House of Love"	1986	Maria Vidal	Maria Vidal		check			
"Angel (In the Sway of Those Summer Nights)"	1986	Maria Vidal	Maria Vidal		check			
"Life on the Train"	1986	Maria Vidal	Maria Vidal		check			
"Heart Wars"	1987	Jennifer Rush	Heart over Mind	check				
"Don't Lose Any Sleep"	1987	John Waite	Rover's Return		check			
"Sometimes"	1987	John Waite	Rover's Return		check			
"Big Time for Love"	1987	John Waite	Rover's Return	check				
"Spirit of Love"	1987	Laura Branigan	Touch	check				
"Heaven Is a Place on Earth"	1987	Belinda Carlisle	Heaven on Earth	check	check			
"Circle in the Sand"	1987	Belinda Carlisle	Heaven on Earth	check	check			
"I Feel Free"	1987	Belinda Carlisle	Heaven on Earth		check			
"Should I Let You In?"	1987	Belinda Carlisle	Heaven on Earth		check			
"World Without You"	1987	Belinda Carlisle	Heaven on Earth		check			
"I Get Weak"	1987	Belinda Carlisle	Heaven on Earth		check			
"We Can Change"	1987	Belinda Carlisle	Heaven on Earth	check	check			
"Fool for Love"	1987	Belinda Carlisle	Heaven on Earth		check			
"Nobody Owns Me"	1987	Belinda Carlisle	Heaven on Earth		check			
"Love Never Dies"	1987	Belinda Carlisle	Heaven on Earth	check	check			
"Perfect View"	1989	The Graces	Perfect View		check			
"Time Waits for No One"	1989	The Graces	Perfect View		check			
"What Does It Take?"	1989	Then Jerico	The Big Area		check			
"Reeling"	1989	Then Jerico	The Big Area		check			
"Where You Lie"	1989	Then Jerico	The Big Area		check			
"Sugar Box"	1989	Then Jerico	The Big Area		check			
"Helpless"	1989	Then Jerico	The Big Area		check			
"Rooms on Fire"	1989	Stevie Nicks	The Other Side of the Mirror	check				
"Long Way to Go"	1989	Stevie Nicks	The Other Side of the Mirror	check				
"Two Kinds of Love" (with Bruce Hornsby)	1989	Stevie Nicks	The Other Side of the Mirror	check				
"Ooh My Love"	1989	Stevie Nicks	The Other Side of the Mirror	check				
"Leave a Light On"	1989	Belinda Carlisle	Runaway Horses	check	check			
"Runaway Horses"	1989	Belinda Carlisle	Runaway Horses	check	check			
"Vision of You"	1989	Belinda Carlisle	Runaway Horses	check	check			
"Summer Rain"	1989	Belinda Carlisle	Runaway Horses		check			
"La Luna"	1989	Belinda Carlisle	Runaway Horses	check	check			
"(We Want) The Same Thing"	1989	Belinda Carlisle	Runaway Horses	check	check			
"Deep Deep Ocean"	1989	Belinda Carlisle	Runaway Horses		check			
"Valentine"	1989	Belinda Carlisle	Runaway Horses		check			
"Whatever It Takes"	1989	Belinda Carlisle	Runaway Horses	check	check			
"Shades of Michaelangelo"	1989	Belinda Carlisle	Runaway Horses		check			
"Lay Down Your Guns"	1990	Jimmy Barnes	Two Fires	check				
"Live Your Life Be Free"	1991	Belinda Carlisle	Live Your Life Be Free	check	check			
"Do You Feel Like I Feel?"	1991	Belinda Carlisle	Live Your Life Be Free	check	check			
"You Came Out of Nowhere"	1991	Belinda Carlisle	Live Your Life Be Free	check	check			
"You're Nothing Without Me"	1991	Belinda Carlisle	Live Your Life Be Free	check	check			
"I Plead Insanity"	1991	Belinda Carlisle	Live Your Life Be Free	check	check			
"Emotional Highway"	1991	Belinda Carlisle	Live Your Life Be Free	check	check			
"Love Revolution"	1991	Belinda Carlisle	Live Your Life Be Free	check	check			
"World of Love"	1991	Belinda Carlisle	Live Your Life Be Free		check			
"Touch Down Easy"	1991	Ric Ocasek	Fireball Zone	check				
"Love Is Holy"	1992	Kim Wilde	Love Is	check	check			
"I Won't Change the Way I Feel"	1992	Kim Wilde	Love Is	check	check			
"A Miracle's Coming"	1992	Kim Wilde	Love Is	check	check			
"Maybe Love Will Change Your Mind"	1994	Stevie Nicks	Street Angel	check				
"Body and Soul"	1994	Anita Baker	Rhythm of Love	check				
"My Father's Eyes"	1994	Marie-Claire D'Ubaldo	Marie Claire D'Ubaldo	check	check			
"Falling into You"	1994	Marie-Claire D'Ubaldo	Marie Claire D'Ubaldo	check	check			
"No Turning Back"	1994	Marie-Claire D'Ubaldo	Marie Claire D'Ubaldo	check	check			
"You Never Love the Same Way Twice"	1994	Rozalla	Look No Further	check	check			
"Sleeping with An Angel"	1995	Real McCoy	Another Night	check	check			
"Crossing the River"	1995	The Devlins	Batman Forever OST	check	check			
"In Too Deep"	1995	Jenny Morris	Salvation Jane	check	check			
"Naked and Sacred"	1995	Chynna Phillips	Naked and Sacred	check	check			
"Remember Me"	1995	Chynna Phillips	Naked and Sacred	check	check			
"Falling into You"	1996	Celine Dion	Falling into You	check	check			
"Sex Will Keep Us Together"	1996	Divinyls	Underworld	check				
"One and One" (featuring Maria Nayler)	1996	Robert Miles	Dreamland	check				
"In Too Deep"	1996	Belinda Carlisle	A Woman and a Man	check				
"California"	1996	Belinda Carlisle	A Woman and a Man	check				
"Remember September"	1996	Belinda Carlisle	A Woman and a Man	check				
"Love in the Key of C"	1996	Belinda Carlisle	A Woman and a Man	check				
"My Heart Goes Out to You"	1996	Belinda Carlisle	A Woman and a Man	check				
"I Wouldn't Be Here If I Didn't Love You"	1996	Belinda Carlisle	Stolen Hearts OST	check	check			
"L'Éclat De Nos Cœurs"	1997	Native	Couleurs De L'Amour	check				
"Naked Without You"	1997	Roachford	Feel	check				
"Intimacy"	1997	The Corrs	Talk on Corners	check	check			
"I Give Myself (Up) to You"	1997	Edyta Górniak	Edyta Górniak	check				
"One & One"	1997	Edyta Górniak	Edyta Górniak	check				
"Intimacy"	1997	Meja	Seven Sisters	check				
"Female Intuition"	1997	Crystal Waters	Crystal Waters	check	check			
"Love Save Me"	1997	Real McCoy	One More Time	check				
"Naked and Sacred"	1998	Maria Nayler	Non-album single	check	check			
"The Power of Good-Bye"	1998	Madonna	Ray of Light	check				
"To Have and Not to Hold"	1998	Madonna	Ray of Light	check				
"Little Star"	1998	Madonna	Ray of Light	check				
"I Was Thinking of You"	1998	The Tuesdays	The Tuesdays	check				
"Open Mind"	1998	Des'ree	Life EP	check	check			
"Get a Life"	1998	Des'ree	Life EP	check	check			
"Time"	1998	Des'ree	Supernatural	check	check			
"Everytime It Rains"	1998	Ace of Base	Cruel Summer	check				
"The Heart's Lone Desire"	1998	Matthew Marsden	Say Who	check	check			
"Will You Be with Me?"	1998	Maria Nayler	Non-album single	check				
"Naked Without You"	1998	Taylor Dayne	Naked Without You	check				
"I Have Always Loved You"	1998	No Mercy	More	check				
"You Get What You Give"	1998	New Radicals	Maybe You've Been Brainwashed Too	check				
"Thinking of You (I Drive Myself Crazy)"	1998	NSYNC	The Winter Album	check				
"Loving You"	1999	Me & My	Let the Love Go On	check				
"Sexual (Li Da Di)"	1999	Amber	Amber	check				
"Naked Without You"	1999	Joe Cocker	No Ordinary World	check				
"Above the Clouds"	1999	Amber	Amber	check				
"Love One Another"	1999	Amber	Amber	check				
"Northern Star"	1999	Melanie C	Northern Star	check				
"I Turn to You"	1999	Melanie C	Northern Star	check	check			
"If That Were Me"	1999	Melanie C	Northern Star	check	check			
"Closer"	1999	Melanie C	Northern Star	check				
"Feel the Sun"	1999	Melanie C	Northern Star	check				
"Anywhere But Here"	1999	K.d. lang	Anywhere But Here OST	check	check			
"I Have Always Loved You"	1999	Enrique Iglesias	Enrique	check				
"Oyeme"	1999	Enrique Iglesias	Enrique	check	check			
"A Prayer for Everyone"	1999	Belinda Carlisle	A Place on Earth: The Greatest Hits	check				
"Sky"	2000	Sonique	Hear My Cry	check	check			
"I Wonder What It Would Be Like"	2000	Melanie C	Non-album single	check				
"Whatever Turns You On"	2000	Devin	Here on Earth OST	check	check			
"Girl in Tears"	2000	Mytown	MyTown	check	check			
"The Consequences of Falling"	2000	K.d. lang	Invincible Summer	check				
"Life is a Rollercoaster"	2000	Ronan Keating	Ronan	check	check			
"Heal Me"	2000	Ronan Keating	Ronan	check	check			
"Bless You Child"	2000	Bette Midler	Bette	check	check			
"Inner Smile"	2000	Texas	The Greatest Hits	check				
"Fuoco nel fuoco"	2000	Eros Ramazzotti	Stilelibero		check			
"Più che puoi" (with Cher)	2000	Eros Ramazzotti	Stilelibero		check			
"He'll Come Home"	2000	Rita	Time for Peace	check				
"Be Free"	2001	Live Element	Non-album single	check				
"I Can't Deny It"	2001	Rod Stewart	Human	check				check
"Yes!"	2001	Amber	Naked	check				
"I Miss You"	2001	Stevie Nicks	Trouble in Shangri-La	check	check			
"Scream If You Wanna Go Faster"	2001	Geri Halliwell	Scream If You Wanna Go Faster	check	check			
"Shake Your Bootie Cutie"	2001	Geri Halliwell	Scream If You Wanna Go Faster	check	check			
"Strength of a Woman"	2001	Geri Halliwell	Scream If You Wanna Go Faster	check	check			
"Erase Her"	2001	LFO	Life is Good	check	check			
"Dandelion" (solo / featuring Kelis)	2001	LFO	Life is Good	check	check			
"If I Learn to Fly"	2001	LFO	Life is Good	check	check			
"Believer"	2001	Jennie Lofgren	Meant to Be	check	check			
"Meant to Be"	2001	Jennie Lofgren	Meant to Be	check	check			
"This Day"	2001	Jennie Lofgren	Meant to Be	check	check			
"Sleep"	2001	Jennie Lofgren	Meant to Be	check	check			
"Standing Still"	2001	Jewel	This Way	check				
"This Way"	2001	Jewel	This Way	check				
"I Won't Walk Away"	2001	Jewel	This Way	check				
"Destiny"	2001	Geri Halliwell	Non-album single	check	check			
"Think Positive"	2002	Maria Montell	Think Positive	check				
"Hard Candy"	2002	Maria Montell	Think Positive	check				
"Whenever You Feel Like It"	2002	Kylie Minogue	Fever	check	check			
"Tears from the Moon" (featuring Sinéad O'Connor)	2002	Conjure One	Conjure One	check	check			
"Lift Me Up" (with Darren Hayes)	2002	Olivia Newton-John	2	check	check			
"Tears from the Moon"	2002	Lunascape	Reflecting Syelence	check				
"Sleep with Me"	2002	Edyta Górniak	Perla	check				
"Creepin' Up on You"	2002	Darren Hayes	Spin	check	check			
"I Can't Ever Get Enough of You"	2002	Darren Hayes	Spin	check	check			
"Like It or Not"	2002	Darren Hayes	Spin	check	check			
"What You Like"	2002	Darren Hayes	Spin	check	check			
"Where You Want to Be"	2002	Darren Hayes	Spin	check	check			
"Lift Me Up"	2002	Darren Hayes	Spin	check	check			
"I Love It When We Do"	2002	Ronan Keating	Destination	check	check			
"Love Won't Work (If We Don't Try)"	2002	Ronan Keating	Destination	check	check			
"Come Be My Baby"	2002	Ronan Keating	Destination	check	check			
"Lovin' Each Day"	2002	Ronan Keating	Destination	check				
"My One Thing That's Real"	2002	Ronan Keating	Destination	check	check			
"Time for Love"	2002	Ronan Keating	Destination	check	check			
"Blown Away"	2002	Ronan Keating	Destination	check	check			
"As Much As I Can Give You Girl"	2002	Ronan Keating	Destination	check	check			
"Pickin' Me Up"	2002	Ronan Keating	Destination	check	check			
"Never's Such a Long Time"	2002	Lamya	Learning from Falling	check				
"The Game of Love" (featuring Michelle Branch)	2002	Santana	Shaman	check	check			
"Sleep" (featuring Marie-Claire D'Ubaldo)	2002	Conjure One	Conjure One	check	check			
"On the Horizon"	2003	Melanie C	Reason	check	check			
"Inferno High Love"	2003	Kelli Ali	Tigermouth	check	check			
"Teardrop Hittin' the Ground"	2003	Kelli Ali	Tigermouth	check	check			
"Keep on Dreaming"	2003	Kelli Ali	Tigermouth	check	check			
"Angel in L.A."	2003	Kelli Ali	Tigermouth	check	check			
"Here Comes the Summer"	2003	Kelli Ali	Tigermouth	check	check			
"Fellow Man"	2003	Kelli Ali	Tigermouth	check	check			
"Queen of the World"	2003	Kelli Ali	Tigermouth	check	check			
"Wings in Motion"	2003	Kelli Ali	Tigermouth	check	check			
"The Infinite Stars"	2003	Kelli Ali	Tigermouth	check	check			
"Kids"	2003	Kelli Ali	Tigermouth	check	check			
"Tigermouth"	2003	Kelli Ali	Tigermouth	check	check			
"Everybody Finds Out"	2003	Fleetwood Mac	Say You Will	check				
"Sweet Temptation"	2003	Jewel	0304	check				
"Yes U Can"	2003	Jewel	0304	check				
"White Flag"	2003	Dido	Life for Rent	check				
"Sand in My Shoes"	2003	Dido	Life for Rent	check				
"Do You Have a Little Time"	2003	Dido	Life for Rent	check				
"This Land is Mine"	2003	Dido	Life for Rent	check				
"Closer"	2003	Dido	Life for Rent	check				
"When You Say You Love Me"	2003	Clay Aiken	Measure of a Man	check	check			
"Action"	2003	Holly Valance	State of Mind	check	check			
"Believer"	2003	Atomic Kitten	Ladies Night	check	check			
"When You Say You Love Me"	2004	Human Nature	Walk the Tightrope	check	check			
"Meant to Be"	2004	Human Nature	Walk the Tightrope	check	check			
"Never Felt Like This Before"	2004	Shaznay Lewis	Open	check	check			
"Dance"	2004	Shaznay Lewis	Open	check	check			
"You"	2004	Shaznay Lewis	Open	check	check			
"Mi abbandono a te"	2004	Laura Pausini	Resta in ascolto	check	check			
"If It's Too Late"	2004	Natalia	This Time	check				
"Even God Can't Change the Past"	2005	Charlotte Church	Tissues and Issues	check				
"Hypnotic"	2005	Craig David	The Story Goes...	check	check			
"One Last Dance"	2005	Craig David	The Story Goes...	check	check			
"Just Chillin'"	2005	Craig David	The Story Goes...	check	check			
"Just Hold On"	2005	Texas	Red Book	check	check			
"In God's Hands"	2006	Nelly Furtado	Loose	check	check			
"Somebody to Love"	2006	Nelly Furtado	Loose	check	check			
"My Idea of Heaven"	2006	Leigh Nash	Blue on Blue	check				
"Nervous in the Light of Dawn"	2006	Leigh Nash	Blue on Blue	check				
"A Teardrop Hitting the Ground"	2006	The Veronicas	The Secret Life Of...	check	check			
"Chick Fit"	2006	All Saints	Studio 1	check	check			
"Put Your Arms Around Me"	2007	Sandra	The Art of Love	check	check			
"Casino Royale"	2007	Sandra	The Art of Love	check	check			
"Runaway"	2007	Nelly Furtado	Loose	check	check			
"Jealous Girl"	2007	Nana Tanimura	Non-album single	check				
"I Can't Wait"	2007	Young Divas	New Attitude	check				
"Soon We'll Be Found"	2008	Sia	Some People Have Real Problems	check				
"My Heart Can't Change"	2008	Taylor Dayne	Satisfied	check				
"Music in My Soul"	2008	Sandi Thom	The Pink & The Lily	check				
"Green Light"	2008	John Legend	Evolver	check				
"Next Plane Home"	2008	Daniel Powter	Under the Radar	check				
"Fallin' for You"	2009	Colbie Caillat	Breakthrough	check	check			
"Runnin' Around"	2009	Colbie Caillat	Breakthrough	check	check			
"Break Through"	2009	Colbie Caillat	Breakthrough	check	check			
"Don't Hold Me Down"	2009	Colbie Caillat	Breakthrough	check				
"Never Let You Go"	2009	Colbie Caillat	Breakthrough	check				
"Hold Your Head High"	2009	Colbie Caillat	Breakthrough	check	check			
"Leave a Light On"	2009	Erik Gronwall	Erik Grönwall	check				
"Who Wants to Be Alone" (with Nelly Furtado)	2009	Tiësto	Kaleidoscope	check				
"Unbreakable"	2010	Dennis	Blonde	check				
"Standing Right in Front of You"	2010	Keith Urban	Defying Gravity	check				
"Thank You"	2010	Keith Urban	Defying Gravity	check				
"Plague of Love"	2010	Katie Melua	The House	check				
"Twisted"	2010	Katie Melua	The House	check				
"I Love You Forever"	2010	Jewel	Sweet and Wild	check				
"Hang On"	2010	Weezer	Hurley	check				
"Represent"	2010	Weezer	Hurley	check				
"Satisfied"	2010	CeeLo Green	The Lady Killer	check				
"Cry Baby"	2010	CeeLo Green	The Lady Killer	check				
"I Follow Rivers"	2011	Lykke Li	Wounded Rhymes	check				
"Brixton Briefcase" (featuring CeeLo Green)	2011	Chase & Status	No More Idols	check		check		
"Youth Knows No Pain"	2011	Lykke Li	Wounded Rhymes	check				
"Love Out of Lust"	2011	Lykke Li	Wounded Rhymes	check				
"Sadness is a Blessing"	2011	Lykke Li	Wounded Rhymes	check				
"Jerome"	2011	Lykke Li	Wounded Rhymes	check				
"Living in the Moment"	2011	Jason Mraz	Love Is a Four Letter Word	check	check			
"The World as I See It"	2011	Jason Mraz	Love Is a Four Letter Word	check	check			
"Before I Let You Go"	2011	Colbie Caillat	All of You	check	check			
"What If"	2011	Colbie Caillat	All of You	check	check			
"Dream Life, Life"	2011	Colbie Caillat	All of You	check	check			
"In Love with the World"	2011	Aura Dione	Before the Dinosaurs	check	check			
"Into the Wild"	2011	Aura Dione	Before the Dinosaurs	check	check			
"Masterpiece"	2011	Aura Dione	Before the Dinosaurs	check	check			
"America"	2011	Aura Dione	Before the Dinosaurs	check	check			
"Recipe"	2011	Aura Dione	Before the Dinosaurs	check	check			
"Superhuman"	2011	Aura Dione	Before the Dinosaurs	check	check			
"Before the Dinosaurs"	2011	Aura Dione	Before the Dinosaurs	check	check			
"Dark Paradise"	2012	Lana Del Rey	Born to Die	check		check		
"Summertime Sadness"	2012	Lana Del Rey	Born to Die	check		check		
"Lucky Ones"	2012	Lana Del Rey	Born to Die	check		check		
"Bubblegum Bitch"	2012	Marina	Electra Heart	check	check			
"Homewrecker"	2012	Marina	Electra Heart	check	check			
"The State of Dreaming"	2012	Marina	Electra Heart	check	check			
"Valley of the Dolls"	2012	Marina	Electra Heart	check	check			
"Hypocrates"	2012	Marina	Electra Heart	check	check			
"Believers (Arab Spring)"	2012	Nelly Furtado	The Spirit Indestructible	check	check			
"End of the World"	2012	Nelly Furtado	The Spirit Indestructible	check				check
"Cry"	2012	Nelly Furtado	The Spirit Indestructible	check	check			
"Play"	2012	Nelly Furtado	The Spirit Indestructible	check	check			
"Nineteen Again"	2012	Ronan Keating	Fires	check	check			
"Get Back to What is Real"	2012	Ronan Keating	Fires	check	check			
"Will You Ever Be Mine?"	2012	Ronan Keating	Fires	check	check			
"American"	2012	Lana Del Rey	Paradise EP	check	check			
"Cola"	2012	Lana Del Rey	Paradise EP	check	check			
"Body Electric"	2012	Lana Del Rey	Paradise EP	check	check			
"Silver Line"	2014	Lykke Li	I Never Learn	check				
"Gunshot"	2014	Lykke Li	I Never Learn	check				
"Love Me Like I'm Not Made of Stone"	2014	Lykke Li	I Never Learn	check				
"Heart of Steel"	2014	Lykke Li	I Never Learn	check				
"West Coast"	2014	Lana Del Rey	Ultraviolence	check				
"Sad Girl"	2014	Lana Del Rey	Ultraviolence	check				check
"Black Beauty"	2014	Lana Del Rey	Ultraviolence	check				check
"Guns and Roses"	2014	Lana Del Rey	Ultraviolence	check	check			
"Is This Happiness"	2014	Lana Del Rey	Ultraviolence	check				
"Loud Places" (featuring Romy)	2015	Jamie xx	In Colour	check				
"Untangled Love"	2015	Brandon Flowers	The Desired Effect	check				
"High by the Beach"	2015	Lana Del Rey	Honeymoon	check	check			
"Music to Watch Boys To"	2015	Lana Del Rey	Honeymoon	check	check			
"Honeymoon"	2015	Lana Del Rey	Honeymoon	check	check			
"Terrence Loves You"	2015	Lana Del Rey	Honeymoon	check	check			
"God Knows I Tried"	2015	Lana Del Rey	Honeymoon	check	check			
"Freak"	2015	Lana Del Rey	Honeymoon	check	check			
"Art Deco"	2015	Lana Del Rey	Honeymoon	check	check			
"Burnt Norton (Interlude)"	2015	Lana Del Rey	Honeymoon		check			
"Religion"	2015	Lana Del Rey	Honeymoon	check	check			
"Salvatore"	2015	Lana Del Rey	Honeymoon	check	check			
"The Blackest Day"	2015	Lana Del Rey	Honeymoon	check	check			
"24"	2015	Lana Del Rey	Honeymoon	check	check			
"Swan Song"	2015	Lana Del Rey	Honeymoon	check	check			
"Don't Let Me Be Misunderstood"	2015	Lana Del Rey	Honeymoon		check			
"Wicked Love"	2016	Foxes	All I Need	check				
"Good to Love"	2016	FKA Twigs	Non-album single	check	check			
"Wrong Crowd"	2016	Tom Odell	Wrong Crowd	check				
"Magnetised"	2016	Tom Odell	Wrong Crowd	check	check			
"Still Getting Used to Being On My Own"	2016	Tom Odell	Wrong Crowd	check				
"She Don't Belong to Me"	2016	Tom Odell	Wrong Crowd	check				
"Mystery"	2016	Tom Odell	Wrong Crowd	check				
"Unravelling"	2016	Melanie C	Version of Me	check				
"Love"	2017	Lana Del Rey	Lust for Life	check	check			
"Lust for Life" (featuring The Weeknd)	2017	Lana Del Rey	Lust for Life	check	check			
"To Be Human" (featuring Labrinth)	2017	Sia	Wonder Woman OST	check				
"Summer Bummer" (featuring ASAP Rocky and Playboi Carti)	2017	Lana Del Rey	Lust for Life				check	
"Groupie Love" (featuring ASAP Rocky)	2017	Lana Del Rey	Lust for Life	check	check			
"Lost in Your Light" (featuring Miguel)	2017	Dua Lipa	Dua Lipa	check				
"13 Beaches"	2017	Lana Del Rey	Lust for Life	check	check			
"Cherry"	2017	Lana Del Rey	Lust for Life		check			
"White Mustang"	2017	Lana Del Rey	Lust for Life	check	check			
"In My Feelings"	2017	Lana Del Rey	Lust for Life	check	check			
"Coachella - Woodstock in My Mind"	2017	Lana Del Rey	Lust for Life	check	check			
"God Bless America – And All the Beautiful Women In It"	2017	Lana Del Rey	Lust for Life	check	check			
"When the World Was at War We Kept Dancing"	2017	Lana Del Rey	Lust for Life	check	check			
"Beautiful People Beautiful Problems" (featuring Stevie Nicks)	2017	Lana Del Rey	Lust for Life	check	check			
"Tomorrow Never Came" (featuring Sean Ono Lennon)	2017	Lana Del Rey	Lust for Life	check	check			
"Heroin"	2017	Lana Del Rey	Lust for Life	check	check			
"Change"	2017	Lana Del Rey	Lust for Life	check	check			
"Get Free"	2017	Lana Del Rey	Lust for Life	check	check			
"Hunt You Down"	2017	Kesha	Rainbow	check	check			
"24/7"	2017	The Neighbourhood	The neighbourhood	check				
"Love" (with Empress Of)	2017	DJDS	Big Wave More Fire	check				
"Bad Woman"	2018	Lykke Li	So Sad So Sexy	check				
"Hurricanes"	2018	Dido	Still on My Mind	check				
"Out of Love"	2018	Alessia Cara	The Pains of Growing	check	check			
"Take You Home"	2019	Dido	Still on My Mind	check				
"Soft to Be Strong"	2019	Marina	Love + Fear	check				
"The Next Best American Record"	2019	Lana Del Rey	Norman Fucking Rockwell!	check	check			
"Bartender"	2019	Lana Del Rey	Norman Fucking Rockwell!	check	check			
"Happiness Is a Butterfly"	2019	Lana Del Rey	Norman Fucking Rockwell!	check			check	
"Yosemite"	2021	Lana Del Rey	Chemtrails over the Country Club	check				
"Friends That Break Your Heart"	2021	James Blake	Friends That Break Your Heart	check	check			
"Noise"	2021	Tom Odell	Monsters	check				
"Monster V.2"	2021	Tom Odell	Monsters	check				
"Me and My Friends"	2021	Tom Odell	Monsters	check				
"Streets of Heaven"	2021	Tom Odell	Monsters	check	check			
"Monster V.1"	2021	Tom Odell	Monsters	check				
"Treetops"	2024	Ben Goldsmith	The Start of Something Beautiful	check				
"The Start of Something Beautiful"	2024	Ben Goldsmith	The Start of Something Beautiful	check				
"Empty Bench"	2024	David Kushner	20 Years From Now		check			
"Love Worth Saving"	2025	David Kushner	20 Years From Now		check			
"Breathe In, Breathe Out"	2025	David Kushner	20 Years From Now		check			
"Ends With You"	2025	David Kushner	20 Years From Now		check			
"I Wanna Get to Heaven"	2025	David Kushner	20 Years From Now		check			
"Beautiful Things Don't Ask for Attention"	2025	David Kushner	20 Years From Now		check			
"Safe in My Arms"	2025	David Kushner	20 Years From Now		check			
"Higher Love" (with Cardi B, DJ Khaled, Natania and Subhi)	2025	Desi Trill	Smurfs Movie Soundtrack	check				
"Wild and Alone" (with pinkpantheress)	2025	FKA twigs	Eusexua Afterglow	check				
"Heaven's Sirens"	2025	David Kushner	Heaven's Sirens	check				
