= List of songs recorded by Lana Del Rey =

Songs by American singer-songwriter

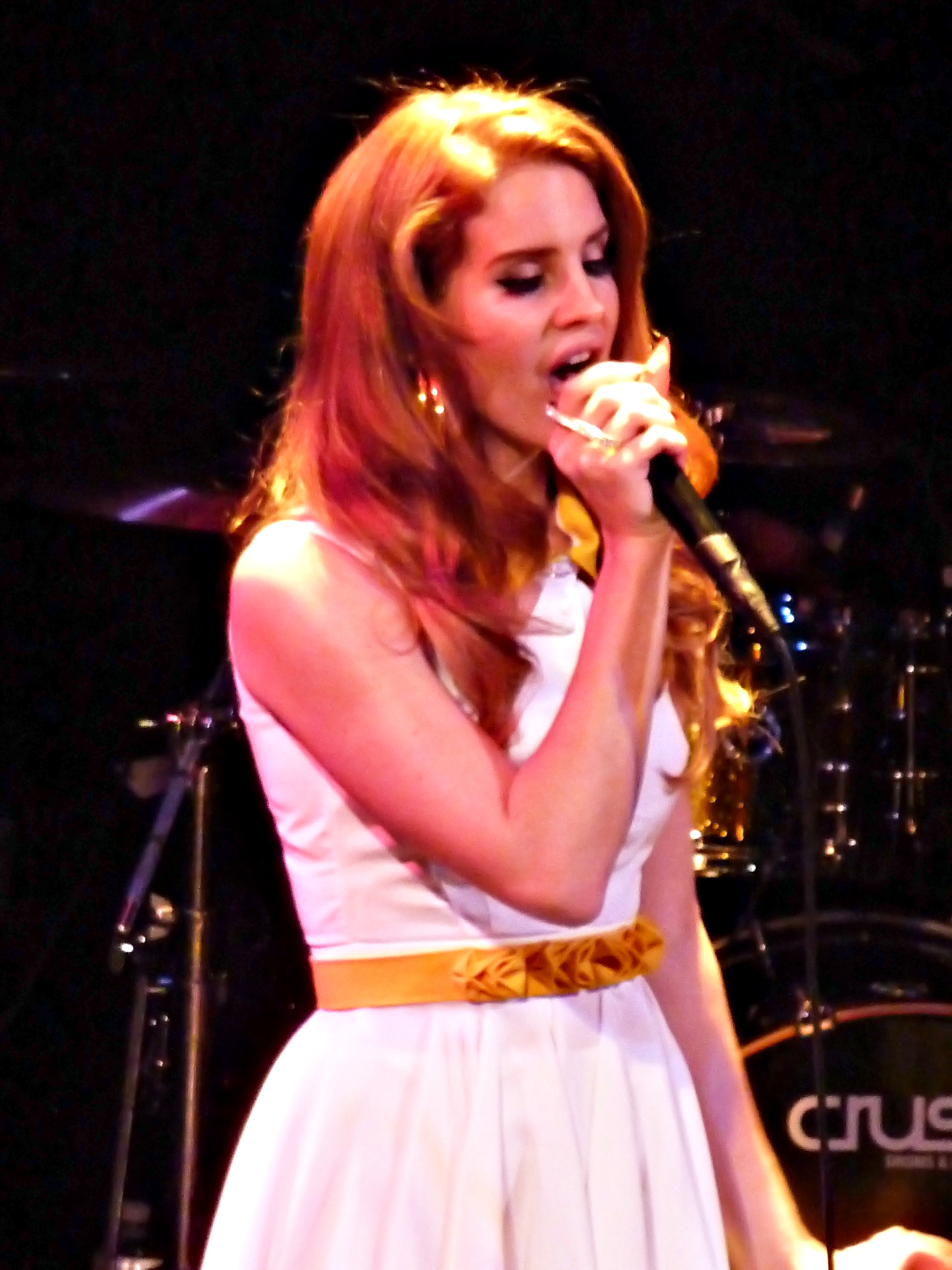
Del Rey performing at the Bowery Ballroom in New York City, December 2011

American singer-songwriter Lana Del Rey has recorded songs for nine studio albums, three extended plays (EPs), as well as guest features. Her debut EP Kill Kill (2008) was released by 5 Points Records under her birth name Elizabeth "Lizzy" Grant; its tracks "Kill Kill" and "Yayo" were written solely by Grant, while the remaining song "Gramma (Blue Ribbon Sparkler Trailer Heaven)" was co-written by Grant and David Kahne. She assumed the stage name Lana Del Ray for her debut studio album Lana Del Ray (2010) and wrote the majority of the record by herself, although Kahne is credited with co-writing four tracks on the project.

Grant, who by this point had adopted her current stage name Lana Del Rey, signed a recording contract with Stranger Records in 2011; she released her debut single "Video Games", which she co-wrote with Justin Parker, that year. After the commercial success of the track, Del Rey signed a recording contract with Interscope Records and Polydor Records for the release of her second album Born to Die (2012). The album reached number one in eleven countries and was certified Platinum in eighteen. The songs on Born to Die were written by Del Rey in collaboration with Justin Parker, Tim Larcombe, Emile Haynie, Dan Heath, Mike Daly, The Nexus, Rick Nowels, Chris Braide, Jim Irvin, Sacha Skarbek, Liam Howe, and Hannah Robinson.

Del Rey followed Born to Die with an EP called Paradise in November 2012. The EP featured a cover of the song "Blue Velvet", written by Bernie Wayne and Lee Morris, and a re-recording of "Yayo". The rest of the songs were written by Del Rey with contributions by Justin Parker, Rick Nowels, Emile Haynie, Tim Larcombe and Dan Heath. In 2013, Del Rey contributed the song "Young and Beautiful" to the soundtrack of Baz Luhrmann's 2013 film adaptation of The Great Gatsby. She also recorded a cover of the song "Once Upon a Dream", originally written by Sammy Fain and Jack Lawrence, for the soundtrack of the dark fantasy film Maleficent (2014).

Del Rey's third studio album, Ultraviolence, was released in the summer of 2014. Debuting at number one in twelve countries, as of June 2014, it has been certified Gold in Canada, and Silver in the United Kingdom. The album featured a cover of the song "The Other Woman", written by Jessie Mae Robinson. The other songs on the album were written by Del Rey in collaboration with Blake Stranathan, Dan Heath, Rick Nowels, Barrie O’Neill, Greg Kurstin, Robbie Fitzsimmons, Dan Auerbach, and Harmony Korine. In the same year, she also contributed the songs "Big Eyes" and "I Can Fly" to the soundtrack of Tim Burton's biographical film Big Eyes, which focuses on the American artist Margaret Keane. The songs were co-written by Dan Heath and Rick Nowels, respectively. Del Rey collaborated with Emile Haynie on the song "Wait for Life" for his debut album We Fall in 2015.

Del Rey is featured on "Prisoner" from The Weeknd's Beauty Behind the Madness, which was released in August 2015. Her fourth studio album, Honeymoon was released in September 2015 and was preceded by the release of the singles "High by the Beach", "Music To Watch Boys To" and "Terrence Loves You". Twelve of the album's tracks were collaborations between Del Rey and Rick Nowels. "High by the Beach" has additional writing credits from Kieron Menzies. A cover of "Don't Let Me Be Misunderstood", originally recorded by Nina Simone and written by Bennie Benjamin, Gloria Caldwell and Sol Marcus, is included in the album, and "Burnt Norton (Interlude)" features Del Rey reciting T. S. Eliot's 1936 poem Burnt Norton.

Del Rey provided uncredited backing vocals on "Party Monster" and was featured on an interlude entitled "Stargirl Interlude" from The Weeknd's Starboy released in 2016. Del Rey released her fifth studio album Lust for Life on July 21, 2017, preceded by the singles "Love" and "Lust for Life". Del Rey collaborated with artists The Weeknd, ASAP Rocky, Playboi Carti, Stevie Nicks and Sean Ono Lennon on various songs on the album. Rick Nowels returns to the album, having writing credits in fourteen out of sixteen songs on the album. Benjamin Levin and Emilie Haynie have writing credits on the lead single from the album, "Love". The Weeknd has writing and vocal credits on the titular song of the album. Canadian record producer Boi-1da, ASAP Rocky, Playboi Carti, Tyler Williams, Jahaan Sweet and Andrew Joseph Gradwohl Jr. all have writing credits on the sixth song from the album, "Summer Bummer". ASAP Rocky returns on seventh track on the album, "Groupie Love", with writing and vocal credits. Justin Parker and Stevie Nicks both have writing credits on the song "Beautiful People Beautiful Problems", with Nicks also having vocal credits. Sean Ono Lennon has writing and vocal credits on the thirteenth song on the album, "Tomorrow Never Came".

== Songs ==
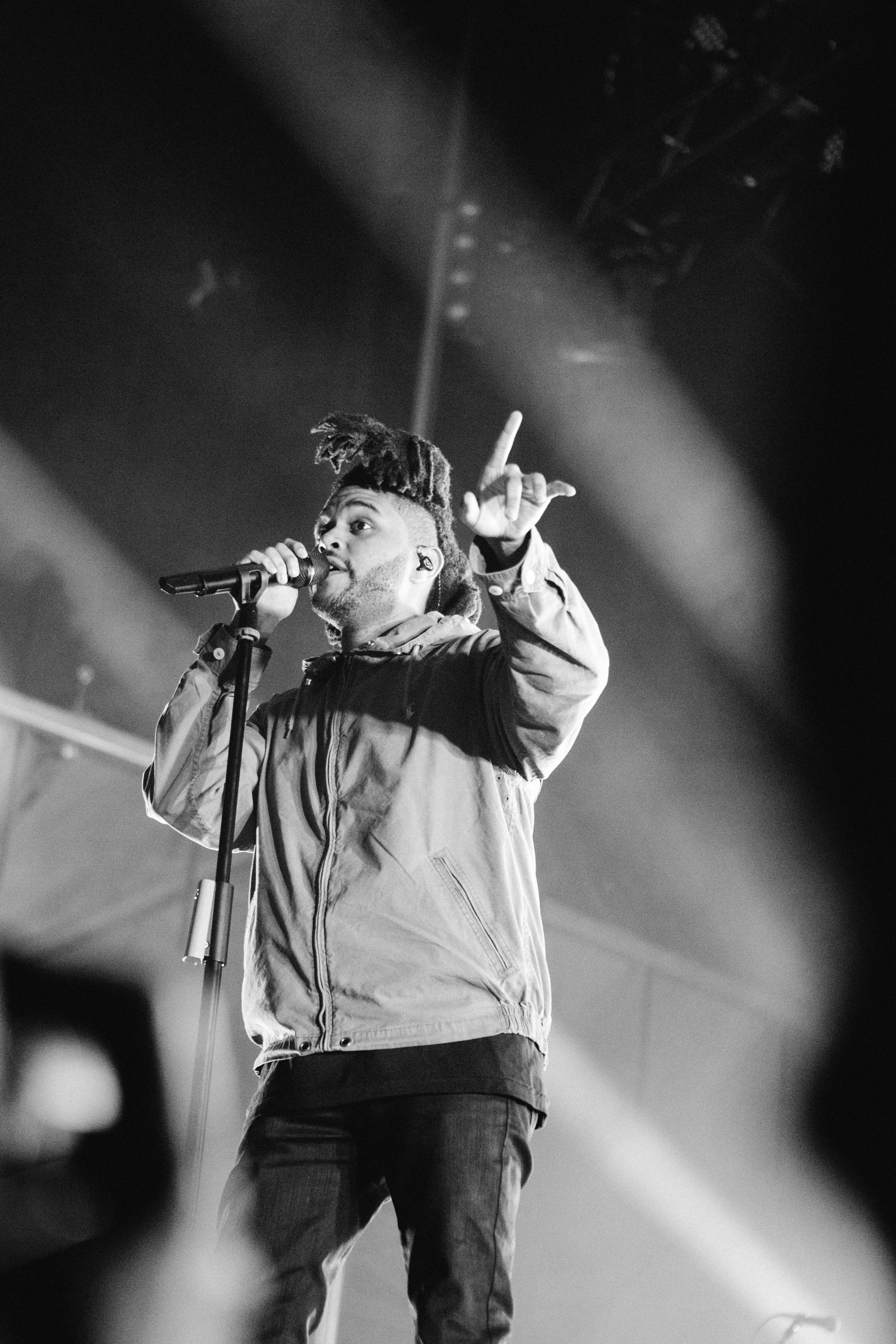
The Weeknd collaborated with Del Rey on "Lust for Life", "Prisoner", "Stargirl Interlude" and "The Abyss".

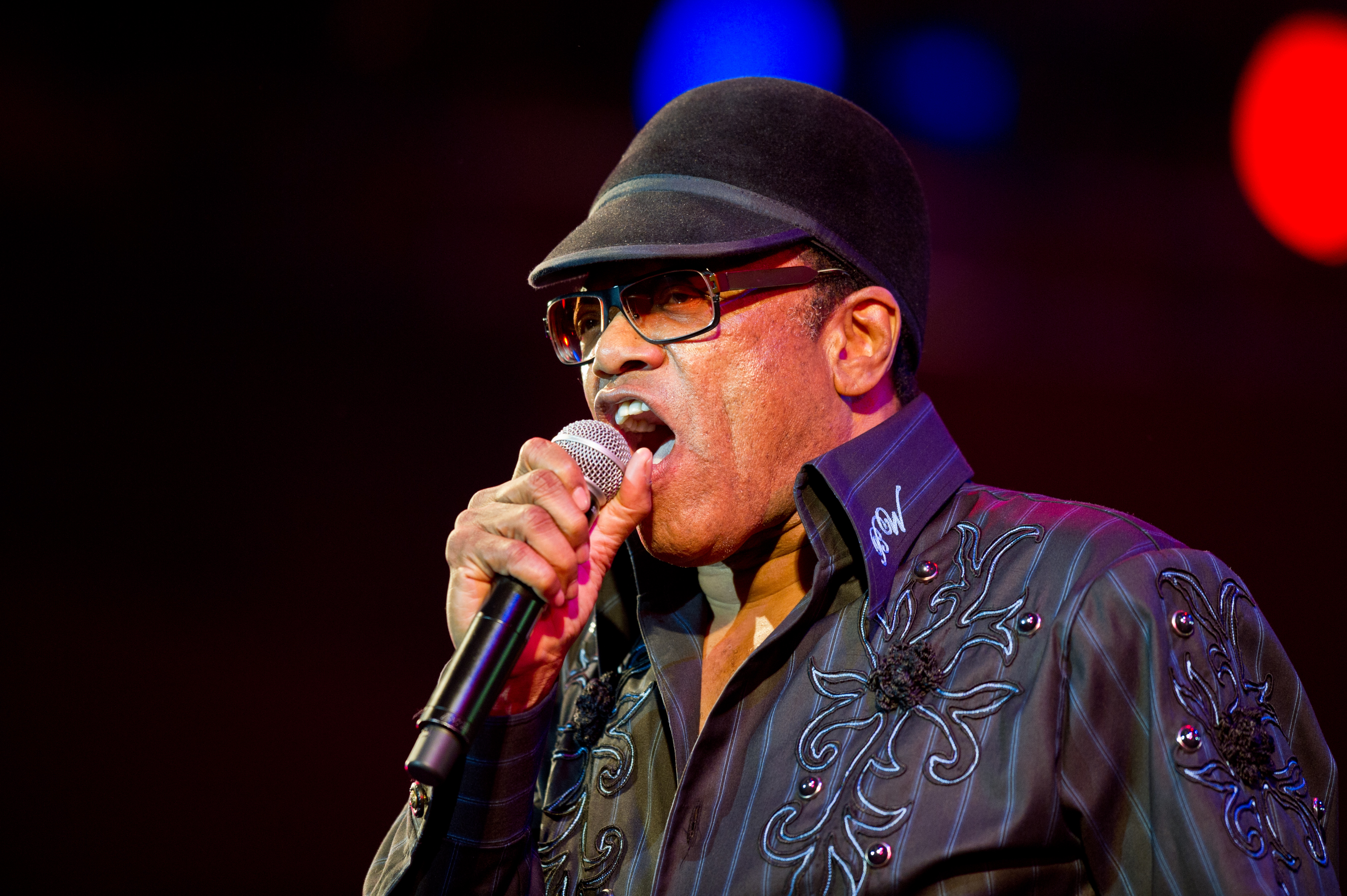
Bobby Womack (pictured) featured Del Rey on the track "Dayglo Reflection".

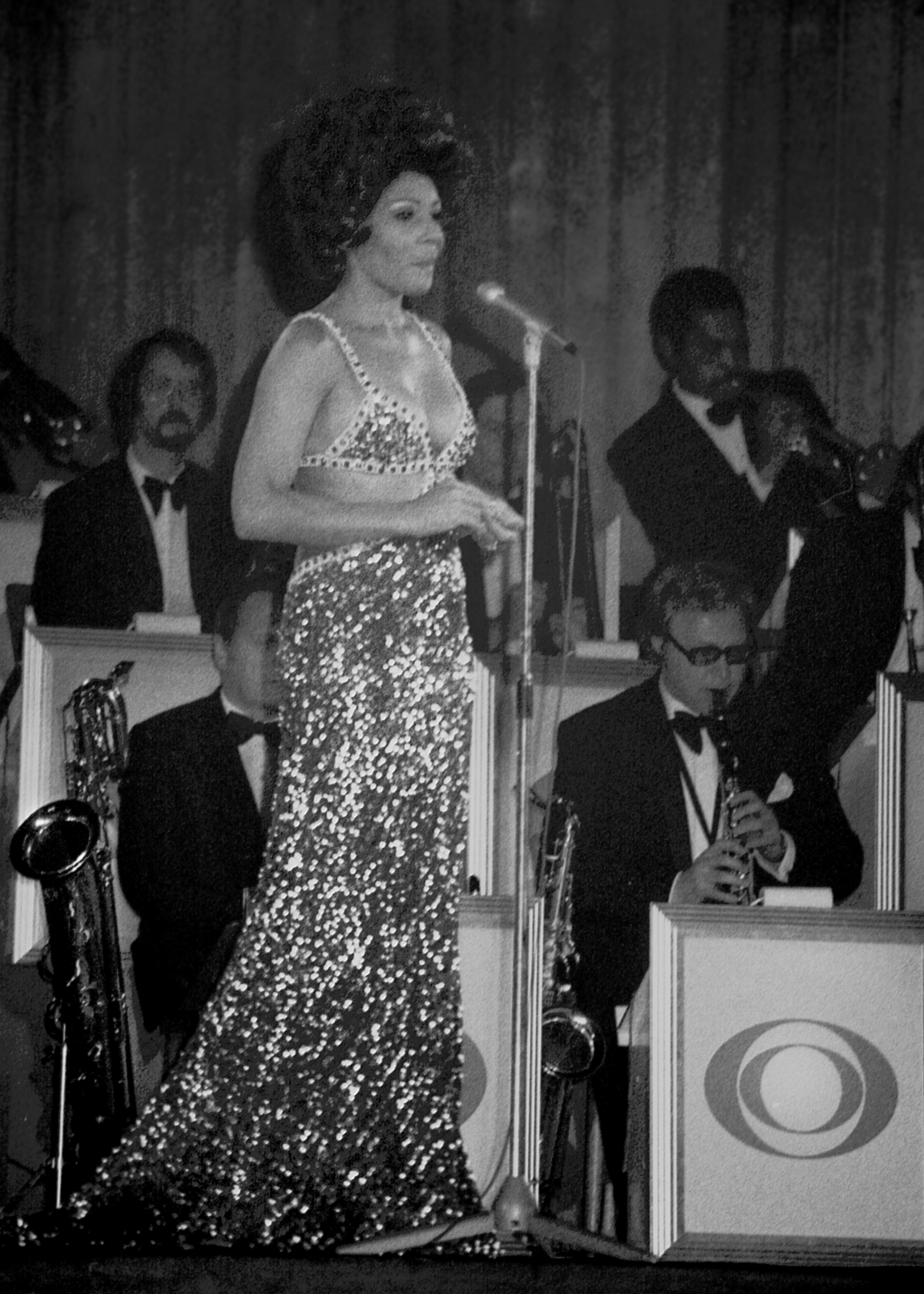
Del Rey covered Shirley Bassey's "Spender".

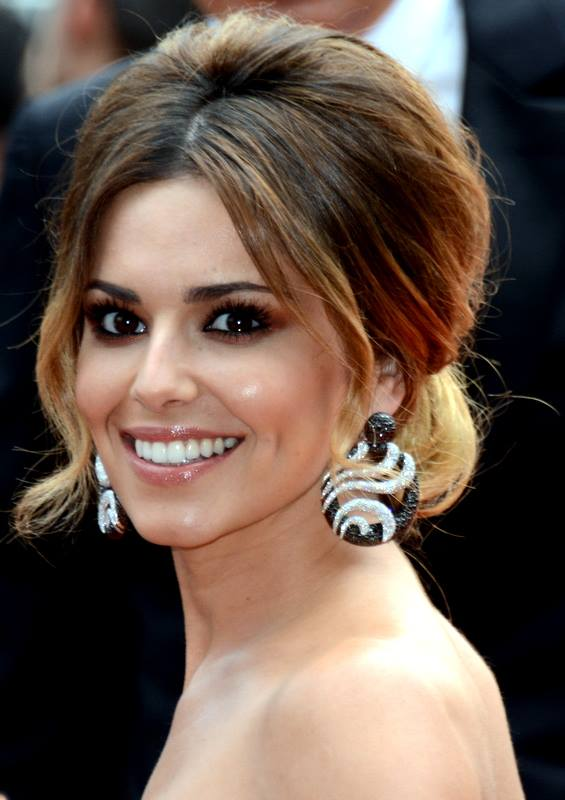
Del Rey penned the song "Ghetto Baby" (2012) for British recording artist, Cheryl.

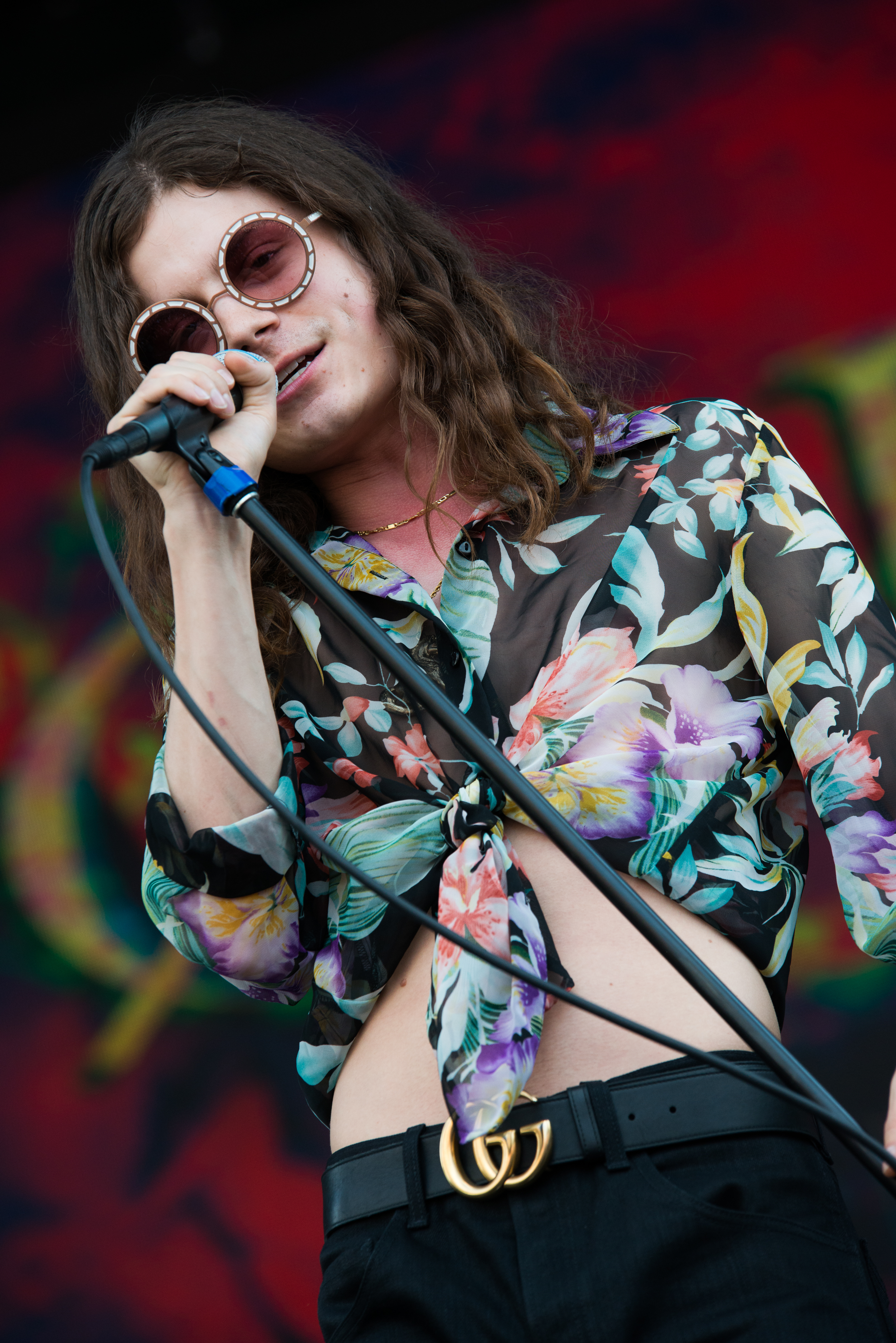
In 2017, Del Rey and Borns collaborated on the songs "God Save Our Young Blood" and "Blue Madonna".

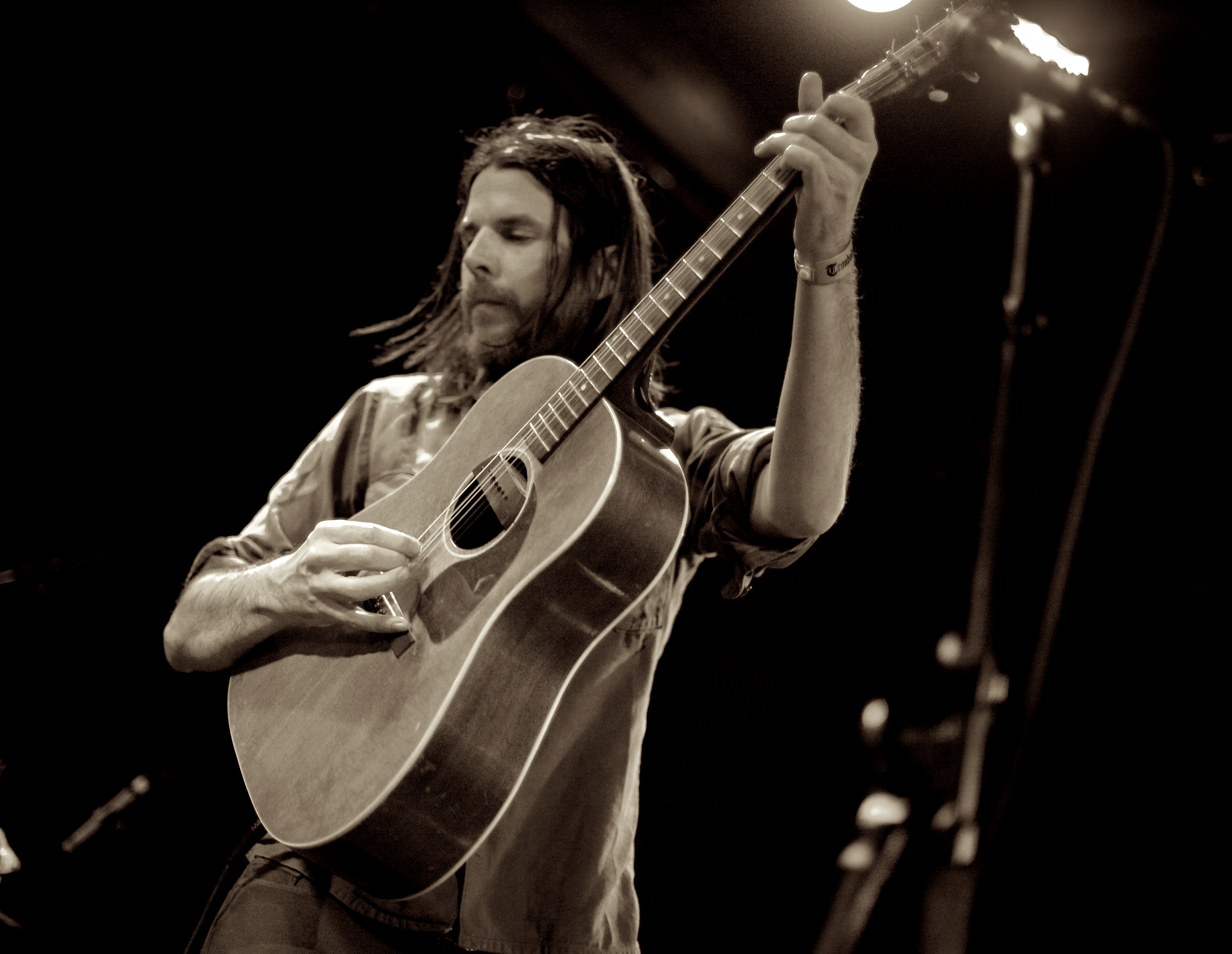
Jonathan Wilson collaborated on a song with Del Rey for his album Rare Birds.

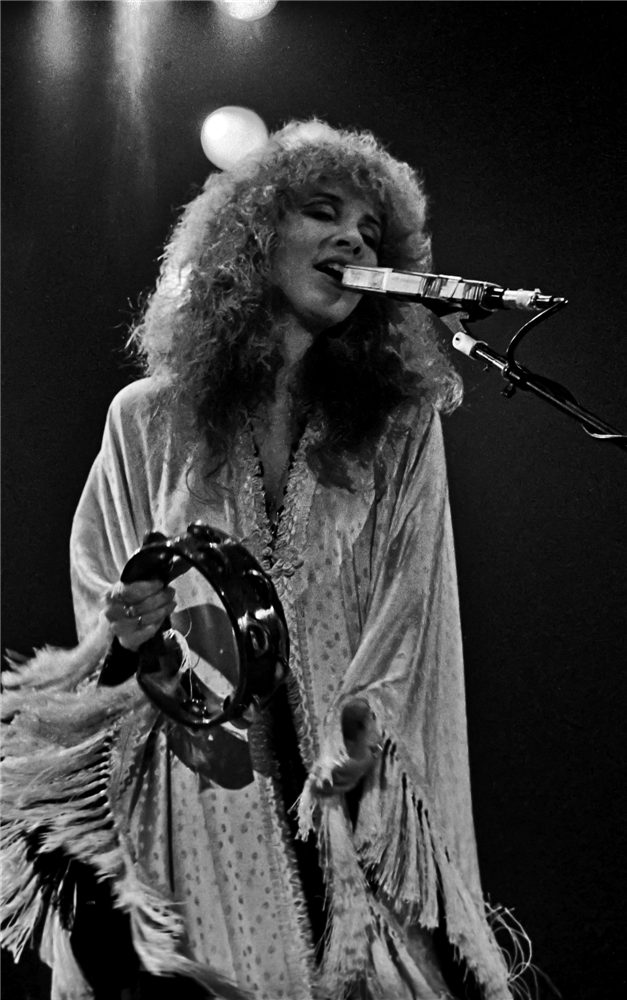
Del Rey and Stevie Nicks (pictured in 1980) collaborated on a song for her record, Lust for Life.

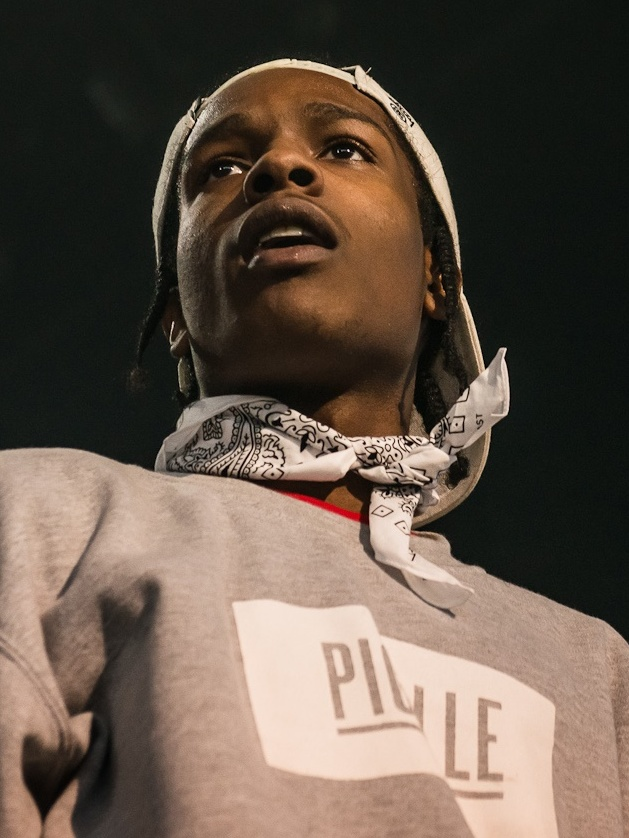
Del Rey and rapper ASAP Rocky have collaborated on several songs including "Groupie Love", "Summer Bummer", and the unreleased track, "Ridin'"

Key
†	Indicates single release

Title	Artist(s)	Writer(s)	Album(s)	Year	Ref.
"13 Beaches"	Lana Del Rey	Lana Del Rey; Rick Nowels	Lust for Life	2017	
"24"	Lana Del Rey	Lana Del Rey; Rick Nowels	Honeymoon	2015	
"A&W" †	Lana Del Rey	Lana Del Rey; Jack Antonoff; Sam Dew	Did You Know That There's a Tunnel Under Ocean Blvd	2023	
"American"	Lana Del Rey	Lana Del Rey; Rick Nowels; Emile Haynie	Paradise	2012	
"Arcadia" †	Lana Del Rey	Lana Del Rey; Drew Erickson	Blue Banisters	2021	
"Art Deco"	Lana Del Rey	Lana Del Rey; Rick Nowels	Honeymoon	2015	
"Bartender"	Lana Del Rey	Lana Del Rey; Rick Nowels	Norman Fucking Rockwell	2019	
"Beautiful"	Lana Del Rey	Lana Del Rey; Drew Erickson	Blue Banisters	2021	
"Beautiful People Beautiful Problems"	Lana Del Rey featuring Stevie Nicks	Lana Del Rey; Rick Nowels; Justin Parker; Stevie Nicks	Lust for Life	2017	
"Bel Air"	Lana Del Rey	Lana Del Rey; Dan Heath	Paradise; Tropico	2012; 2013	
"Big Eyes"	Lana Del Rey	Lana Del Rey; Dan Heath	Big Eyes	2014	
"Black Bathing Suit"	Lana Del Rey	Lana Del Rey; Drew Erickson; Zachary Dawes	Blue Banisters	2021	
"Black Beauty" †	Lana Del Rey	Lana Del Rey; Rick Nowels	Ultraviolence	2014	
"The Blackest Day"	Lana Del Rey	Lana Del Rey; Rick Nowels	Honeymoon	2015	
"Blue Banisters" †	Lana Del Rey	Lana Del Rey; Gabe Simon	Blue Banisters	2021	
"Blue Jeans" †	Lana Del Rey	Lana Del Rey; Emile Haynie; Dan Heath	Lana Del Rey; Born to Die	2012	
"Blue Velvet" †	Lana Del Rey	Lee Morris; Bernie Wayne	Paradise	2012	
"Body Electric"	Lana Del Rey	Lana Del Rey; Rick Nowels	Paradise; Tropico	2012; 2013	
"Born to Die" †	Lana Del Rey	Lana Del Rey; Justin Parker	Lana Del Rey; Born to Die	2012	
"Breaking Up Slowly"	Lana Del Rey featuring Nikki Lane	Lana Del Rey; Nikki Lane	Chemtrails over the Country Club	2021	
"Brite Lites"	Lana Del Rey	Elizabeth Grant	Lana Del Ray	2010	
"Brooklyn Baby" †	Lana Del Rey	Lana Del Rey; Barrie O'Neill	Ultraviolence	2014	
"Buddy's Rendezvous"	Lana Del Rey featuring Father John Misty	Joshua Tillman	Chloë and the Next 20th Century	2022	
"Burning Desire" †	Lana Del Rey	Lana Del Rey; Justin Parker	Paradise	2012	
"Burnt Norton (Interlude)"	Lana Del Rey	T.S. Eliot	Honeymoon	2015	
"California"	Lana Del Rey	Lana Del Rey; Zach Dawes	Norman Fucking Rockwell	2019	
"Candy Necklace" †	Lana Del Rey featuring Jon Batiste	Lana Del Rey; Jon Batiste	Did You Know That There's a Tunnel Under Ocean Blvd	2023	
"Carmen" †	Lana Del Rey	Lana Del Rey; Justin Parker	Born to Die	2012	
"Change"	Lana Del Rey	Lana Del Rey; Rick Nowels	Lust for Life	2017	
"Chemtrails over the Country Club" †	Lana Del Rey	Lana Del Rey; Jack Antonoff	Chemtrails over the Country Club	2021	
"Cherry"	Lana Del Rey	Lana Del Rey; Tim Larcombe	Lust for Life	2017	
"Cherry Blossom"	Lana Del Rey	Lana Del Rey; Rick Nowels	Blue Banisters	2021	
"Chet Baker" (Live)	Mando Diao with Lana Del Rey	Gustaf Norén; Björn Dixgård	Above and Beyond – MTV Unplugged	2010	
"Cinnamon Girl"	Lana Del Rey	Lana Del Rey; Jack Antonoff	Norman Fucking Rockwell	2019	
"Coachella – Woodstock in My Mind" †	Lana Del Rey	Lana Del Rey; Rick Nowels	Lust for Life	2017	
"Cola"	Lana Del Rey	Lana Del Rey; Rick Nowels	Paradise	2012	
"Crazy For You"	Lana Del Rey	Lana Del Rey; Rick Nowels	Honeymoon sessions Grand Theft Auto VI: The Album	2015; 2026	
"Cruel World"	Lana Del Rey	Lana Del Rey; Blake Stranathan	Ultraviolence	2014	
"Dance Till We Die"	Lana Del Rey	Lana Del Rey; Jack Antonoff	Chemtrails over the Country Club	2021	
"Dark but Just a Game"	Lana Del Rey	Lana Del Rey; Jack Antonoff	Chemtrails over the Country Club	2021	
"Dark Paradise" †	Lana Del Rey	Lana Del Rey; Rick Nowels	Born to Die	2012	
"Dayglo Reflection"	Bobby Womack featuring Lana Del Rey	Damon Albarn; Sam Cooke; Lana Del Rey; Harold Payne; Richard Russell; Bobby Womack	The Bravest Man in the Universe	2012	
"Dealer"	Lana Del Rey	Lana Del Rey; Loren Humphrey; Miles Kane; Tyler Parkford; Zachary Dawes	Blue Banisters	2021	
"Did You Know That There's a Tunnel Under Ocean Blvd" †	Lana Del Rey	Lana Del Rey; Mike Hermosa	Did You Know That There's a Tunnel Under Ocean Blvd	2023	
"Diet Mountain Dew"	Lana Del Rey	Lana Del Rey; Mike Daly	Born to Die	2012	
"Doin' Time" †	Lana Del Rey	Ira Gershwin, George Gershwin, Marshall Goodman, Maggie Plum, Dorothy Heyward, DuBose Heyward, Bradley Nowell	Norman Fucking Rockwell	2019	
"Don't Call Me Angel"	Lana Del Rey; Ariana Grande; Miley Cyrus	Alma-Sofia Miettinen; Ariana Grande; Ilya Salmanzadeh; Lana Del Rey; Max Martin; Miley Cyrus; Savan Kotecha	Charlie's Angels: Original Motion Picture Soundtrack	2019	
"Don't Let Me Be Misunderstood"	Lana Del Rey	Bennie Benjamin; Gloria Caldwell; Sol Marcus	Honeymoon	2015	
"Fingertips"	Lana Del Rey	Lana Del Rey; Drew Erickson	Did You Know That There's a Tunnel Under Ocean Blvd	2023	
"First Light" †	Lana Del Rey	Lana Del Rey David Arnold	First Light	2026	
"Fishtail"	Lana Del Rey	Lana Del Rey; Jack Antonoff; Aljosha Frederick Konstanty; Ann Tomberlin	Did You Know That There's a Tunnel Under Ocean Blvd	2023	
"Flipside"	Lana Del Rey	Lana Del Rey; Blake Stranathan	Ultraviolence	2014	
"Florida Kilos"	Lana Del Rey	Lana Del Rey; Dan Auerbach; Harmony Korine	Ultraviolence	2014	
"For Free"	Lana Del Rey featuring Zella Day and Weyes Blood	Joni Mitchell	Chemtrails over the Country Club	2021	
"For K, Pt. 2"	Lana Del Rey	Elizabeth Grant	Lana Del Rey	2010	
"Freak"	Lana Del Rey	Lana Del Rey; Rick Nowels	Honeymoon	2015	
"Fuck It I Love You" †	Lana Del Rey	Lana Del Rey; Jack Antonoff	Norman Fucking Rockwell	2019	
"Fucked My Way Up to the Top"	Lana Del Rey	Lana Del Rey; Daniel Heath	Ultraviolence	2014	
"Get Free"	Lana Del Rey	Lana Del Rey; Rick Nowels; Kieron Menzies	Lust for Life	2017	
"Ghetto Baby"	Cheryl Cole^{1}	Lana Del Rey; Roy Kerr; Anu Pillai	A Million Lights	2012	
"Gloria" (Live)	Mando Diao with Lana Del Rey	Björn Dixgård; Gustaf Norén	Above and Beyond – MTV Unplugged	2010	
"God Bless America – and All the Beautiful Women in It"	Lana Del Rey	Lana Del Rey; Rick Nowels	Lust for Life	2017	
"God Knows I Tried"	Lana Del Rey	Lana Del Rey; Rick Nowels	Honeymoon	2015	
"Gods & Monsters"	Lana Del Rey	Lana Del Rey; Tim Larcombe	Paradise; Tropico	2012; 2013	
"Gramma (Blue Ribbon Sparkler Trailer Heaven)"	Lizzy Grant; Lana Del Rey	Elizabeth Grant; David Kahne	Kill Kill; Lana Del Rey	2008; 2010	
"Grandfather Please Stand on the Shoulders of My Father While He's Deep-Sea Fishing"	Lana Del Rey featuring Riopy	Lana Del Rey; Riopy	Did You Know That There's a Tunnel Under Ocean Blvd	2023	
"The Grants"	Lana Del Rey	Lana Del Rey; Mike Hermosa	Did You Know That There's a Tunnel Under Ocean Blvd	2023	
"The Greatest" †	Lana Del Rey	Lana Del Rey; Jack Antonoff	Norman Fucking Rockwell	2019	
"Groupie Love" †	Lana Del Rey featuring ASAP Rocky	Lana Del Rey; Rick Nowels; Rakim Mayers	Lust for Life	2017	
"Guns and Roses"	Lana Del Rey	Lana Del Rey; Rick Nowels	Ultraviolence	2014	
"Happiness Is a Butterfly"	Lana Del Rey	Lana Del Rey; Jack Antonoff; Rick Nowels	Norman Fucking Rockwell	2019	
"Heroin"	Lana Del Rey	Lana Del Rey; Rick Nowels	Lust for Life	2017	
"Hey Blue Baby"	Lana Del Rey	Lana Del Rey; Jack Antonoff		2018	
"High by the Beach" †	Lana Del Rey	Lana Del Rey; Rick Nowels; Kieron Menzies	Honeymoon	2015	
"Hollywood Bowl"	Rob Grant featuring Lana del Rey	Rob Grant Lana Del Rey	Lost at Sea	2023	
"Honeymoon" †	Lana Del Rey	Lana Del Rey; Rick Nowels	Honeymoon	2015	
"Hope Is a Dangerous Thing for a Woman Like Me to Have – but I Have It" †	Lana Del Rey	Lana Del Rey; Jack Antonoff	Norman Fucking Rockwell	2019	
"Hotel Sayre"	Craig Armstrong featuring Lana Del Rey	Craig Armstrong	The Great Gatsby (Orchestral Score)	2013	
"How to Disappear"	Lana Del Rey	Lana Del Rey; Jack Antonoff	Norman Fucking Rockwell	2019	
"I Can Fly"	Lana Del Rey	Lana Del Rey; Rick Nowels	Big Eyes	2014	
"I Must Be Stupid for Being So Happy"	Lana Del Rey	Lana Del Rey; Jack Antonoff		2018	
"If You Lie Down with Me"	Lana Del Rey	Lana Del Rey; Drew Erickson; Barrie-James	Blue Banisters	2021	
"In My Feelings"	Lana Del Rey	Lana Del Rey; Rick Nowels	Lust for Life	2017	
"Interlude – The Trio"	Lana Del Rey	Ennio Morricone	Blue Banisters	2021	
"Is This Happiness"	Lana Del Rey	Lana Del Rey; Rick Nowels	Ultraviolence	2014	
"Jealous Girl"	Lana Del Rey	Lana Del Rey; Anu Pillai; Roy Kerr; Elizabeth Foster		2012	
"Jon Batiste Interlude"	Lana Del Rey	Lana Del Rey; Jon Batiste	Did You Know That There's a Tunnel Under Ocean Blvd	2023	
"Judah Smith Interlude"	Lana Del Rey	Lana Del Rey; Jack Antonoff; Judah Smith	Did You Know That There's a Tunnel Under Ocean Blvd	2023	
"Jump"	Lana Del Rey	Elizabeth Grant	Lana Del Rey	2010	
"Kill Kill"	Lizzy Grant; Lana Del Rey	Elizabeth Grant	Kill Kill; Lana Del Rey	2008; 2010	
"Kintsugi"	Lana Del Rey	Lana Del Rey; Jack Antonoff	Did You Know That There's a Tunnel Under Ocean Blvd	2023	
"Let Me Love You like a Woman" †	Lana Del Rey	Lana Del Rey; Jack Antonoff	Chemtrails over the Country Club	2020	
"Let the Light In"	Lana Del Rey featuring Father John Misty	Lana Del Rey; Benji Lysaght; Mike Hermosa	Did You Know That There's a Tunnel Under Ocean Blvd	2023	
"Live My Life"	Tamarama^{1}	David Kahne; Jay Lyon; Nicolas Potts	Tamarama	2010	
"Living Legend"	Lana Del Rey	Lana Del Rey; Barrie-James	Blue Banisters	2021	
"Living with Myself"	Jonathan Wilson	Jonathan Wilson	Rare Birds	2018	
"Lolita"	Lana Del Rey	Lana Del Rey; Liam Howe; Hannah Robinson	Born to Die	2012	
"Looking for America" †	Lana Del Rey	Lana Del Rey; Jack Antonoff		2019	
"Lost at Sea" †	Rob Grant featuring Lana del Rey	Rob Grant Lana Del Rey	Lost at Sea	2023	
"Love" †	Lana Del Rey	Lana Del Rey; Rick Nowels; Emile Haynie; Benjamin Levin	Lust for Life	2017	
"Love Song"	Lana Del Rey	Lana Del Rey; Jack Antonoff	Norman Fucking Rockwell	2019	
"Lover's Fate"	Alice BrightSky^{1}	Alice BrightSky	Box of Me	2013	
"Lucky Ones"	Lana Del Rey	Lana Del Rey; Rick Nowels	Born to Die	2012	
"Lust for Life" †	Lana Del Rey featuring The Weeknd	Lana Del Rey; Rick Nowels; Abel Tesfaye; Max Martin	Lust for Life	2017	
"Magic Tree and I Let Myself Go"	Craig Armstrong featuring Lana Del Rey	Lana Del Rey; Walter De Backer; Rick Nowels; Craig Armstrong	The Great Gatsby (Orchestral Score)	2013	
"Margaret"	Lana Del Rey featuring Bleachers	Lana Del Rey; Jack Antonoff	Did You Know That There's a Tunnel Under Ocean Blvd	2023	
"Mariners Apartment Complex" †	Lana Del Rey	Lana Del Rey; Jack Antonoff	Norman Fucking Rockwell	2018	
"Mermaid Motel"	Lana Del Rey	Elizabeth Grant	Lana Del Rey	2010	
"Million Dollar Man"	Lana Del Rey	Lana Del Rey; Chris Braide	Born to Die	2012	
"Money Power Glory"	Lana Del Rey	Lana Del Rey; Greg Kurstin	Ultraviolence	2014	
"Music to Watch Boys To" †	Lana Del Rey	Lana Del Rey; Rick Boyles	Honeymoon	2015	
"National Anthem" †	Lana Del Rey	Lana Del Rey; Justin Parker; The Nexus	Born to Die	2012	
"Nectar of the Gods"	Lana Del Rey	Lana Del Rey; Barrie-James	Blue Banisters	2021	
"The Next Best American Record"	Lana Del Rey	Lana Del Rey; Rick Nowels	Norman Fucking Rockwell	2019	
"Norman Fucking Rockwell" †	Lana Del Rey	Lana Del Rey; Jack Antonoff	Norman Fucking Rockwell	2019	
"Not All Who Wander Are Lost"	Lana Del Rey	Lana Del Rey; Jack Antonoff	Chemtrails over the Country Club	2021	
"Off to the Races" †	Lana Del Rey	Lana Del Rey; Tim Larcombe	Lana Del Rey; Born to Die	2012	
"Oh Say Can You See"	Lana Del Rey	Elizabeth Grant	Lana Del Rey	2010	
"Old Money"	Lana Del Rey	Lana Del Rey; Daniel Heath; Robbie Fitzsimmons	Ultraviolence	2014	
"Once Upon a Dream" †	Lana Del Rey	Jack Lawrence	Maleficent	2014	
"The Other Woman"	Lana Del Rey	Jessie Mae Robinson	Ultraviolence	2014	
"Paris, Texas"	Lana Del Rey featuring SYML	Lana Del Rey; Brian Fennell	Did You Know That There's a Tunnel Under Ocean Blvd	2023	
"Party Monster" †	The Weeknd^{1}	Abél Tesfaye; Benjamin Diehl; Doc McKinney; Belly; Lana Del Rey	Starboy	2016	
"Pawn Shop Blues"	Lana Del Rey	Elizabeth Grant; David Kahne	Lana Del Rey	2010	
"Peppers"	Lana Del Rey featuring Tommy Genesis	Lana Del Rey; Benji Lysaght; Mike Hermosa; Tommy Genesis	Did You Know That There's a Tunnel Under Ocean Blvd	2023	
"Pretty When You Cry"	Lana Del Rey	Blake Stranathan; Lana Del Rey	Ultraviolence	2014	
"Prisoner"	The Weeknd featuring Lana Del Rey	Abel Tesfaye; Lana Del Rey; Jason "DaHeala" Quenneville	Beauty Behind the Madness	2015	
"Put Me in a Movie"	Lana Del Rey	Elizabeth Grant	Lana Del Rey	2010	
"Queen of the Gas Station"	Lana Del Rey	Elizabeth Grant; David Kahne	Lana Del Rey	2010	
"Radio"	Lana Del Rey	Lana Del Rey; Justin Parker	Born to Die	2012	
"Raise Me Up (Mississippi South)"	Lana Del Rey	Elizabeth Grant	Lana Del Rey	2010	
"Religion"	Lana Del Rey	Lana Del Rey; Rick Nowels	Honeymoon	2015	
"Ride" †	Lana Del Rey	Lana Del Rey; Justin Parker	Paradise	2012	
"Sad Girl"	Lana Del Rey	Lana Del Rey; Rick Nowels	Ultraviolence	2014	
"Salvatore"	Lana Del Rey	Lana Del Rey; Rick Nowels	Honeymoon	2015	
"Say Yes to Heaven" †	Lana Del Rey	Lana Del Rey; Rick Nowels	N/A	2023	
"Season of the Witch"	Lana Del Rey	Donovan	Scary Stories to Tell in the Dark	2019	
"Shades of Cool" †	Lana Del Rey	Lana Del Rey; Rick Nowels	Ultraviolence	2014	
"Smarty"	Lana Del Rey	Elizabeth Grant; David Kahne	Lana Del Rey	2010	
"Some Things Last a Long Time"	Lana Del Rey		Hi, How Are You Daniel Johnston?	2015	
"Spender" / "Big Spender"	Smiler featuring Lana Del Rey	Shirley Bassey	All I Know	2012	
"Stargirl Interlude"	The Weeknd featuring Lana Del Rey	Lana Del Rey; Abél Tesfaye; Doc McKinney; Labrinth	Starboy	2016	
"Summer Bummer" †	Lana Del Rey featuring ASAP Rocky and Playboi Carti	Lana Del Rey; Matthew Samuels; Rakim Mayers; Jordan Carter; Tyler Williams; Jahaan Sweet; Andrew Joseph Gradwohl Jr.	Lust for Life	2017	
"Summertime Sadness" †	Lana Del Rey	Lana Del Rey; Rick Nowels	Born to Die	2012	
"Swan Song"	Lana Del Rey	Lana Del Rey; Rick Nowels	Honeymoon	2015	
"Sweet"	Lana Del Rey	Lana Del Rey; Drew Erickson	Did You Know That There's a Tunnel Under Ocean Blvd	2023	
"Sweet Carolina"	Lana Del Rey	Lana Del Rey; Alana Champion; Caroline Grant; Robert Grant Jr.	Blue Banisters	2021	
"Taco Truck x VB"	Lana Del Rey	Lana Del Rey; Jack Antonoff; Mike Hermosa	Did You Know That There's a Tunnel Under Ocean Blvd	2023	
"Take Me Home, Country Roads"	Lana Del Rey	Bill Danoff; Taffy Nivert; John Denver		2023	
"Terrence Loves You" †	Lana Del Rey	Lana Del Rey; Rick Nowels	Honeymoon	2015	
"Text Book" †	Lana Del Rey	Lana Del Rey; Gabe Simon	Blue Banisters	2021	
"This Is What Makes Us Girls"	Lana Del Rey	Lana Del Rey; Time Larcombe; Jim Irvin	Born to Die	2012	
"Thunder"	Lana Del Rey	Lana Del Rey; Zachary Dawes	Blue Banisters	2021	
"Tomorrow Never Came"	Lana Del Rey featuring Sean Ono Lennon	Lana Del Rey; Sean Ono Lennon; Rick Nowels	Lust for Life	2017	
"Tough"	Lana Del Rey featuring Quavo	Benny Negrin; Clayton Johnson; Elysse Jane Yulo; Henry Walter; Jack Antonoff; Jaxson Free; Josh Dorr; Lana Del Rey; Maddox Batson; Nick Bailey; Quavious Marshall	N/A	2024	
"Tulsa Jesus Freak" †	Lana Del Rey	Lana Del Rey; Jack Antonoff	Chemtrails over the Country Club	2021	
"Two Minutes to Four and Reunited"	Craig Armstrong featuring Lana Del Rey	Craig Armstrong	The Great Gatsby (Orchestral Score)	2013	
"Ultraviolence" †	Lana Del Rey	Lana Del Rey; Daniel Heath	Ultraviolence	2014	
"Venice Bitch" †	Lana Del Rey	Lana Del Rey; Jack Antonoff	Norman Fucking Rockwell	2018	
"Video Games" †	Lana Del Rey	Lana Del Rey; Justin Parker	Lana Del Rey; Born to Die	2012	
"Violets for Roses"	Lana Del Rey	Lana Del Rey; Drew Erickson	Blue Banisters	2021	
"Wait for Life"	Emile Haynie featuring Lana Del Rey	Emile Haynie; Lana Del Rey; Thomas Bartlett	We Fall	2015	
"West Coast" †	Lana Del Rey	Lana Del Rey; Rick Nowels	Ultraviolence	2014	
"When the World Was at War We Kept Dancing"	Lana Del Rey	Lana Del Rey; Rick Nowels; Dean Reid	Lust for Life	2017	
"White Mustang"	Lana Del Rey	Lana Del Rey; Rick Nowels	Lust for Life	2017	
"White Dress" †	Lana Del Rey	Lana Del Rey; Jack Antonoff	Chemtrails over the Country Club	2021	
"Wild at Heart"	Lana Del Rey	Lana Del Rey; Jack Antonoff	Chemtrails over the Country Club	2021	
"Wildflower Wildfire" †	Lana Del Rey	Lana Del Rey; Mike Dean; Sean Solymar; Sage Skolfield	Blue Banisters	2021	
"Without You"	Lana Del Rey	Lana Del Rey; Sacha Skarbek	Born to Die	2012	
"Woman"	Cat Power featuring Lana Del Rey		Wanderer	2018	
"Yayo"	Lizzy Grant; Lana Del Rey; Lana Del Rey	Elizabeth Grant	Kill Kill; Lana Del Rey; Paradise	2008; 2010; 2012	
"Yosemite"	Lana Del Rey	Lana Del Rey; Rick Nowels	Chemtrails over the Country Club	2021	
"You Must Love Me"	Lana Del Rey	Tim Rice; Andrew Lloyd Webber	Unmasked: The Platinum Collection	2018	
"You'll Never Walk Alone"	Lana Del Rey	Richard Rodgers; Oscar Hammerstein II	The End of the Storm (Official Soundtrack)	2020	
"Young and Beautiful" †	Lana Del Rey	Lana Del Rey; Rick Nowels	The Great Gatsby: Music from Baz Luhrmann's Film	2013	

== See also ==
- List of unreleased songs recorded by Lana Del Rey

== Notes ==
1. Del Rey provided background vocals on "Ghetto Baby", "Live My Life", "Lover's Fate", "Party Monster", "Pray For Me" and "Blue Madonna" but is not credited as a featured artist on the official track listings.
