= Music to Watch Boys To =

Single by Lana Del Rey

from the album Honeymoon
- Released: September 11, 2015
- Studio: The Green Building (Santa Monica, CA)
- Genre: Pop
- Length: 4:50 (album version); 4:47 (radio edit)
- Label: Interscope; Polydor
- Songwriters: Lana Del Rey; Rick Nowels
- Producers: Lana Del Rey; Rick Nowels; Kieron Menzies

Lana Del Rey singles chronology
"High by the Beach" (2015)	"Music to Watch Boys To" (2015)	"Love" (2017)

Music video
- "Music to Watch Boys To" on YouTube

"Music to Watch Boys To" is a song by American singer Lana Del Rey from her fourth studio album Honeymoon (2015). It was written by Del Rey and Rick Nowels. It was released as the second single from Honeymoon on September 11, 2015, via digital download.

== Background ==
Lana Del Rey first mentioned the song as a potential title for the whole album in late June 2014. On January 2, 2015, Lana Del Rey opened up a little more on the song, elaborating on how she wrote it in a visual, noirish way saying "the title (of the song) lends itself to a visual of shadows of men passing by, this girl's eyes, her face. I can definitely see things". Del Rey later stated that "Music to Watch Boys To is one of my favourite songs from the record, I love the 30 second a cappella beginning. Reminds me of what Les Baxter would've had as a bonus track on Jewels of the Sea." The song was originally eyed as the lead single for the album.

A snippet of the song was featured alongside excerpts from "Terrence Loves You", "Freak" and "High by the Beach" in an album sampler released September 8, 2015. On September 9, 2015, Del Rey posted the official single cover on social media sites along with an announcement that the track would premier later that day on Beats 1 Radio. The song was officially released as the second single on September 11, 2015.

== Music video ==
On June 3, 2015, model Jake Mast tweeted that the music video he had filmed with Del Rey earlier in the year was for the track and would be released in June, however, by the end of the month, no video had been released. In September 2015, Del Rey posted a behind-the-scenes image from the video via her Instagram profile. The official music video premiered on September 30, 2015. The video features Del Rey lounging in a lawn chair while men play basketball on an empty court, and a group of young girls in dresses swimming together underwater. Scenes of Del Rey wearing glitter and wearing a black dress are inter cut in between the footage of the basketball players. The video ends with Del Rey and the young girls holding hands and jumping together in a line.

== Critical reception ==
"Music to Watch Boys To" was met with widespread critical acclaim, many of whom applauded it for its surreal production when reviewing the album, although some were critical of its lack of pace. Metacritic listed it as the top track of the parent album, Honeymoon. In a track-by-track review of the album, Amy Davidson of Digital Spy said: "The perfect 'Music to Watch Boys To' is apparently pretty plodding and calculable. Despite its seductive title, track two never really picks up pace. Yes, this is Lana Del Rey we're talking about and we're hardly expecting a dance-break and a guest rap spot, but it also lacks the syrupy melodrama we've become accustomed to when it comes to the star." Melissa Maerz of Entertainment Weekly wrote: "In 'Music To Watch Boys To,' Del Rey imagines listening to her own songs while gawking at pretty young things, and listening to her multi-tracked sighs, it's hard to tell what turns her on more, listening or looking." Rolling Stone called it "dreamy", saying, "Del Rey's dreamy slow-burner finds her echoing on the chorus, 'I like you a lot / So I do what you want' over a sparse, atmospheric beat."

== Charts ==
Chart (2015)	Peak position
France (SNEP)	117
Sweden Heatseeker (Sverigetopplistan)	17
UK Singles (Official Charts)	186

== Certifications ==
Certifications for "Music to Watch Boys To"
Region	Certification	Certified units/sales
Brazil (Pro-Música Brasil)	Gold	30,000^{‡}
^{‡} Sales+streaming figures based on certification alone.
