= Freak (Lana Del Rey song) =

2015 song by Lana Del Rey

Song by Lana Del Rey

from the album Honeymoon
- Released: September 18, 2015
- Studio: The Green Building (Santa Monica, CA)
- Length: 4:55
- Label: Interscope; Polydor
- Songwriters: Lana Del Rey; Rick Nowels
- Producers: Lana Del Rey; Rick Nowels; Kieron Menzies

Music video
- "Freak" on YouTube

"Freak" is a song recorded by American singer and songwriter Lana Del Rey for her album Honeymoon (2015). It was written by Del Rey and Rick Nowels. A music video for the song was released on February 9, 2016.

== Background ==
Interviewing Del Rey for NME, Al Horner noted the "bassy trap rambles" in the song. Horner asked Del Rey what music she was listening to while composing Honeymoon. Del Rey answered:

I really love Rae Sremmurd so that might be a surprise inspiration. Also Sage the Gemini. I really love listening to some of the people that came out of Atlanta in the last two years. I don't think I was trying to emulate that sound, but I had elements of it in 'Freak' and 'High by the Beach'."

In an interview with The Current, Del Rey she wanted the album Honeymoon to have a "bit of a noire [sic] feel," but that the album "loosened up" with songs like "Art Deco" and "Freak."

== Composition ==
"Freak" is a ballad sung by Del Rey in a soprano voice.

== Critical reception ==
Digital Spy's Amy Davidson stated that Del Rey "dance[s] in slow motion with you before leaning in to convincingly whisper the argument towards being "a freak like me too" in your ear." Jessica Hopper of Pitchfork stated that Del Rey branched away from the normal "pop music style" that she is known for and had begun to include California girl-lyrics into some of the songs off the album include "Freak", "High by the Beach", and "Art Deco". Hopper later went on to praise the switch in lyrical styling which is sampled in the song.

== Music video ==
On January 25, 2016, Del Rey confirmed on social media that a music video to accompany "Freak" had been completed, later confirming that video would premiere on February 9, 2016. She announced that the video would star the girls featured in "Music to Watch Boys To" and singer-songwriter Father John Misty. Segments of the music video were featured in The Honeymoon Sampler that was released onto YouTube on September 8, 2015. The video, which was released on February 9, 2016, features clips of Del Rey, Father John Misty, Chuck Grant and the girls from The Honeymoon Sampler and "Music to Watch Boys To" who were featured earlier in the film in a swimming pool as Claude Debussy's "Clair de Lune" plays. The video was directed by Del Rey herself.

=== Release ===
The video premiered on February 9 at the Wiltern Theater in Los Angeles, California, and was released on her Vevo channel on the same day of the premiere.

=== Critical reception ===
Critics responded positively to the video, with Alex Young of Consequence of Sound describing it as a "compelling, sultry visual" and Nolan Feeney of Time suggesting that the "extravagant" film could be one of the best music videos of 2016. Patricia Garcia from Vogue commented that "the video has a very unsubtle Manson Family vibe", and reflected how "it’s hard not to be entranced" by the video.

== Certifications ==
Region	Certification	Certified units/sales
Brazil (Pro-Música Brasil)	Gold	30,000^{‡}
United States (RIAA)	Gold	500,000^{‡}
^{‡} Sales+streaming figures based on certification alone.
