= Coachella – Woodstock in My Mind =

2017 song by Lana Del Rey

Promotional single by Lana Del Rey

from the album Lust for Life
- Released: May 15, 2017
- Recorded: April 17, 2017
- Studio: Hampstead Studios (London, England); The Green Building (Los Angeles, CA)
- Genre: Trap
- Length: 4:18
- Label: Polydor; Interscope
- Songwriters: Lana Del Rey; Rick Nowels
- Producers: Lana Del Rey; Rick Nowels; Dean Reid; Kieron Menzies

Lana Del Rey promotional singles chronology
"Honeymoon" (2015)	"Coachella – Woodstock in My Mind" (2017)	"Season of the Witch" (2019)

Official audio
- "Coachella – Woodstock in My Mind" on YouTube

"Coachella – Woodstock in My Mind" is a trap song written by American songwriters Lana Del Rey and Rick Nowels. The song was recorded by Del Rey and placed on her fifth studio album Lust for Life. It was released on May 15, 2017 as a promotional single from the album.

Del Rey wrote the song after attending the Coachella Valley Music Festival in April 2017. The song was written out of guilt of the enjoyment of the festival, during a time tension between the United States and North Korea which began in 2017.

== Background and writing ==
The song was first announced on the Arabic streaming service Anghami on May 13, 2017. The song was then released as a promotional single from Lust for Life on May 15, 2017.

Del Rey wrote the song and posted a video of herself on Instagram singing a short snippet of it on April 17, 2017. She recorded the video after attending the 2017 Coachella Valley Music and Arts Festival in Indio, California, and she captioned the video saying:

I'm not gonna lie—I had complex feelings about spending the weekend dancing whilst watching tensions w[ith] North Korea mount. I find [i]t's a tightrope between being vigilantly observant of everything going on in the world and also having enough space and time to appreciate God's good earth the way it was intended to be appreciated. On my way home I found myself compelled to visit an old favorite place of mine at the rim of the world highway where I took a moment to sit down by the sequoia grove and write a little song. I just wanted to share this in hopes that one individual's hope and prayer for peace might contribute to the possibility of it in the long run. Hope everyone has a nice day, with love from California.

== Composition ==
"Coachella – Woodstock in My Mind" has been described by The Guardian as a "sedated trap track". It is a ballad that Exclaim! has described as "an electronic spin on Lana's classic torch-song style". The song's chorus is a "lyrical hat-tip" to "Stairway to Heaven" by Led Zeppelin.

== Credits and personnel ==
Credits adapted from Tidal.

- Lana Del Rey – vocals, production, composition
- Rick Nowels – production, celesta, mellotron, composition, synthesizer programmer
- Dean Reid – production, engineering, mixing, drums, bass guitar, flute, synthesizer programmer
- Kieron Menzies – production, engineering, mixing, drums, keyboard, magnetic tape realization, percussion
- Chris Garcia – engineering
- Trevor Yasuda – keyboard, engineering
- Adam Ayan – mastering engineer

== Charts ==
Chart (2017)	Peak position
France (SNEP)	82
Scottish Singles Sales (Official Charts)	84
US Rock Digital Song Sales (Billboard)	14

== See also ==
- List of anti-war songs
