= Love (Lana Del Rey song) =

Single by Lana Del Rey

from the album Lust for Life
- B-side: "Lust for Life"
- Released: February 18, 2017
- Studio: Electric Lady Studios (New York, NY); Hampstead Studios (London, England); Sole Studios (London, England); Strongroom Studios (London, England); The Green Building (Los Angeles, CA)
- Genre: Alternative pop; bubblegum pop; dream pop; rock
- Length: 4:32
- Label: Polydor; Interscope
- Songwriters: Lana Del Rey; Benjamin Levin; Emile Haynie; Rick Nowels
- Producers: Lana Del Rey; Emile Haynie; Benny Blanco; Rick Nowels; Kieron Menzies

Lana Del Rey singles chronology
"Music to Watch Boys To" (2015)	"Love" (2017)	"Lust for Life" (2017)

Music video
- "Love" on YouTube

"Love" is a song by the American singer Lana Del Rey. It was released on February 18, 2017, by Polydor Records and Interscope Records, as the lead single from her fifth studio album, Lust for Life (2017). The song was written and produced by Del Rey, Benny Blanco, Emile Haynie and Rick Nowels, with additional production by Kieron Menzies. Its release was first teased with promotional posters hung in Los Angeles on February 17, after which the release date was pushed up due to leaked versions of the song surfacing online the same day. The song incorporates alternative pop, bubblegum pop, dream pop, and rock with a 50s style.

== Critical reception ==
Eve Barlow of Pitchfork wrote that "'Love' is an ode to allowing yourself to feel" and that it "reassures the listener that the feeling can still lift, that love can still conquer". Barlow also gave the song the Best New Track designation. Daniel Kreps of Rolling Stone called the song "anthemic" and Frank Guan of Vulture called "Love" "marvellously good".

Pitchfork listed "Love" as the 28th-best song of 2017 in their annual ranking.

== Commercial performance ==
"Love" debuted at No. 44 on the Billboard Hot 100, making it her highest-charting song on the chart since Ultraviolence's lead single, "West Coast". It also debuted at No. 2 on Hot Rock Songs, exceeding the No. 3 peak of "Young and Beautiful" in 2013. "Love" also launched as her first No. 1 on Rock Digital Song Sales (46,000 downloads sold, according to Nielsen Music) and at No. 5 on Rock Streaming Songs (6.6 million domestic streams). The song also peaked at No. 9 on the Digital Songs chart.

== Music video ==
The music video was in production in June 2016. Del Rey's hairstylist, Anna Cofone, also shared photos of her makeup kit on set on Instagram, which she later deleted.

On February 20, 2017, Del Rey announced the music video on an Instagram livestream. Shortly after the livestream it was made available on YouTube. The music video garnered over 19 million views within a week.

The music video begins in black and white, showing Del Rey singing on stage in front of a small audience, intercut with young adult couples getting ready for a day at the beach. As Del Rey sings the chorus, the video fades into color, and scenes of the couples floating through the Solar System in their cars and alone. Towards the end of the video, Del Rey is also seen performing with her band on the surface of the Moon, with the camera turning to the sky, where a symbolic black hole can be seen. It was directed by Rich Lee.

Daniel Kreps of Rolling Stone called the video "dreamy", while writing that the clip "alternates between black-and-white and washed-out color, Del Rey sings "Love" juxtaposed with footage of people "young and in love". Kelsey J. Waite of A.V Club wrote that "'Love' sends you tumbling through space", calling it a "stunning sci-fi video". Luke Morgan Britton of NME wrote that "The video sees Del Rey dramatically performing in Space", while Ben Kaye of Consequence of Sound called the clip "romantic".

== Live performances ==
Del Rey first performed "Love" at the South by Southwest festival in Austin, Texas, on March 17, 2017.

== Use in media ==
The song can be heard in the pilot episode of the television show Siesta Key. Los Angeles music producers DJDS and Empress Of also released a collaborative synth-pop cover of the song on December 1, 2017, via Loma Vista Recordings.

== Track listing ==
Digital download
No.	Title	Length
1.	"Love"	4:39

10" vinyl – "Love" / "Lust for Life" LP
No.	Title	Length
1.	"Love"	4:32
2.	"Lust for Life" (featuring the Weeknd)	4:24

== Credits and personnel ==
Credits adapted from Tidal.

Management

- Published by Heavy Crate Publishing (ASCAP) / Universal Music Publishing Group
- Published by Sony/ATV Music Publishing
- Published by Please Don't Forget to Pay Me Music.
- All rights administered by EMI April Music Inc. and Universal Music Publishing Group

Personnel

- Lana Del Rey – vocals, production
- Benny Blanco – production, keyboard, drums, mixing
- Mike Bozzi – mastering
- Emile Haynie – production, mixing, synthesizer
- Kieron Menzies – production, engineering, mixing
- Rick Nowels – production, keyboard, bass guitar, drums, mellotron, vibraphone
- Dean Reid – engineering, electric guitar

== Charts ==
=== Weekly charts ===
Chart (2017)	Peak position
Australia (ARIA)	41
Austria (Ö3 Austria Top 40)	43
Belgium (Ultratop 50 Flanders)	41
Belgium (Ultratip Bubbling Under Wallonia)	9
Canada Hot 100 (Billboard)	48
Czech Republic Airplay (ČNS IFPI)	17
Czech Republic Singles Digital (ČNS IFPI)	25
France (SNEP)	84
Germany (GfK)	68
Greece Digital Songs (Billboard)	3
Hungary (Single Top 40)	4
Iceland (RÚV)	9
Ireland (IRMA)	35
Italy (FIMI)	53
New Zealand Heatseekers (RMNZ)	3
Portugal (AFP)	47
Scottish Singles Sales (Official Charts)	16
Slovakia Singles Digital (ČNS IFPI)	13
Spain (Promusicae)	86
Sweden (Sverigetopplistan)	49
Switzerland (Schweizer Hitparade)	27
UK Singles (Official Charts)	41
US Billboard Hot 100	44
US Hot Rock & Alternative Songs (Billboard)	2
US Adult Alternative Airplay (Billboard)	29

=== Year-end charts ===
Chart (2017)	Position
US Hot Rock Songs (Billboard)	20

== Certifications ==
Region	Certification	Certified units/sales
Australia (ARIA)	Platinum	70,000^{‡}
Brazil (Pro-Música Brasil)	2× Platinum	120,000^{‡}
Italy (FIMI)	Gold	25,000^{‡}
New Zealand (RMNZ)	Gold	15,000^{‡}
Poland (ZPAV)	Gold	25,000^{‡}
Sweden (GLF)	Gold	20,000^{‡}
United Kingdom (BPI)	Gold	400,000^{‡}
United States (RIAA)	Platinum	1,000,000^{‡}
^{‡} Sales+streaming figures based on certification alone.

== Release history ==
Region	Date	Format	Label	Ref.
Worldwide	February 18, 2017	Digital download	Polydor; Interscope	
United Kingdom	February 24, 2017	Contemporary hit radio	Polydor; Interscope	
Italy	February 24, 2017	Contemporary hit radio	Universal	
United States	March 28, 2017	Alternative radio	Interscope	
