= Honeymoon (Lana Del Rey album) =

Studio album by Lana Del Rey
- Released: September 18, 2015
- Recorded: 2014–2015
- Studios: The Green Building (Santa Monica, California); Electric Lady (New York City)
- Genres: Baroque pop; dream pop; jazz; trip hop
- Length: 65:06
- Labels: Interscope; Polydor
- Producers: Lana Del Rey; Rick Nowels; Kieron Menzies

Lana Del Rey chronology
Ultraviolence (2014)	Honeymoon (2015)	Lust for Life (2017)

Singles from Honeymoon
- 1. "High by the Beach" Released: August 10, 2015; 2. "Music to Watch Boys To" Released: September 11, 2015

Honeymoon is the fourth studio album by American singer-songwriter, and record producer Lana Del Rey. It was released on September 18, 2015, by Interscope and Polydor Records. Produced by Del Rey alongside longtime collaborators Rick Nowels and Kieron Menzies, Honeymoon marked a departure from the more guitar-driven instrumentation of Del Rey's previous effort Ultraviolence (2014) and a return to the baroque pop of Born to Die (2012) and Paradise (2012). Lyrically, the album touches on themes of tortured romance, resentment, lust, escapism and violence.

Honeymoon received positive reviews from music critics, appearing on the 2015 best albums lists of many publications. At the time of its release, several critics considered the album Del Rey's best work to date. (Note: Reviews published in several publications, including Mojo, among others, considered the album Del Rey's best work to date.) Commercially, Honeymoon was a global success, topping the charts in Australia, Greece and Ireland, and reaching the Top 5 in over 20 countries, including Canada, France, Germany, Mexico, Spain, the United Kingdom and the United States, where it debuted at No. 2 on the Billboard 200, selling 116,000 units in its first week. The album was supported by the release of two singles: "High by the Beach", which peaked at No. 51 on the Billboard Hot 100, and "Music to Watch Boys To".

== Background and recording ==
Del Rey finished the recording of her third studio album, Ultraviolence, in March 2014, and by June of the same year she had begun working on a follow-up idea stating that the process was "growing into something I really like. I'm kind of enjoying sinking into this more noirish [sic] feel for this one. It's been good". In a December 2014 interview with Galore Magazine, Del Rey revealed she had begun working on a new album. In January 2015, Lana Del Rey announced via Billboard that she had begun work on her fourth studio album, announcing she was going to release an album entitled Honeymoon sometime that same year. At the time of the announcement, Del Rey also said that she had written and recorded nine songs that could possibly be featured on the album and stated that she was covering Nina Simone's "Don't Let Me Be Misunderstood". During the interview with Billboard, Del Rey stated that the album would be different from her previous release, Ultraviolence (2014), but similar to her first major release, Born to Die (2012), and the extended play Paradise (2012).

During the album's recording process it was reported that producer Mark Ronson had collaborated with Del Rey for Honeymoon, but their writing sessions did not produce any material for the album. In December 2014, Del Rey stated to Grazia magazine that she wanted to introduce orchestrations with monumental choruses with a touch of subdued grunge for the album, during the recording sessions she played ten songs to Mark Ronson and stated that the album would be exploring a sound close to the golden age of jazz. Besides working with Ronson, Del Rey also worked with Dan Heath and Rick Nowels, with the pair Del Rey began writing small pieces for independent films continuing to state that "Dan Heath and Rick Nowels are two of my dearest friends and producers and we are always up to something". Heath would eventually not feature on the album; however, Rick Nowels went on to co-produce and co-write each song with Del Rey. In January 2015, Del Rey confirmed the song "Music to Watch Boys To" which was initially intended to be the title for the whole album, she also revealed that she wrote it in a visual, noirish way saying "the title (of the song) lends itself to a visual of shadows of men passing by, this girl's eyes, her face. I can definitely see things". The same month, Del Rey stated she was aiming to record a few more songs to tie the project together. "High by the Beach" was recorded as one of the last tracks for the album. Its development started with its chorus, which was inspired by frequent drives along a beach.

== Composition ==
=== Music and lyrics ===
Musically, Honeymoon has been variously described as a retro-styled work of "grand, cinematic baroque pop", "elegantly melancholy dream pop", "haunted jazz" and a return to "the cinematic trip hop" of Del Rey's debut album Born to Die, while also incorporating elements of trap, blues and downtempo pop. The album's production was noted as containing sighs, whispers, subtly layered vocals, melodies that lazily unwind, decaying synths, echoing guitar lines, strings, hazes and restrained drum patterns. Built over chopped-and-screwed samples, hints of jazz and Morricone-like soundscapes, Honeymoon has been characterized as Del Rey's most sophisticated album. According to Nick Levine of Time Out, Honeymoon was seen as a departure from the "grungy" tones of Ultraviolence opting for a "glossier" production, which was characterized as containing swirls of cinematic strings, twangy guitars and exquisitely miserable melodies. Andy Gill of The Independent noted Del Rey's vocals as being "multi-layered cooing", airy and ethereal. Gill continued in-depth to say:

Honeymoon finds Del Rey reverting, after the more atomised, individual characters of last year's Ultraviolence, to a composite persona closer to the dissolute subject of her Born to Die debut. Not only does her vocal delivery remain the same throughout, but also its protagonist's "voice"; while the emotional impact of what might sometimes be traumatic developments seems somehow damped, as if experienced through a narcotised haze. Happy or sad, angry or apologetic, dominant or submissive, it's apparently all the same to Del Rey, who floats through these songs with a weird indifference.

Lyrically, Honeymoon features content that touches upon tortured romance, bitterness, lust and violence. It also features lyrical content involving eroticism, drugs, mythology, and "the American soul".

=== Songs ===
The album opens with the title track, a baroque pop and blue-eyed soul song. The Verge described the song as containing "sweeping strings and stuttering snares" that "float through the background of the song". Time called the song "characteristically broody" and "cinematic", and suggested it "leans closer to the sounds of her breakthrough LP Born to Die than the material she cooked up with the Black Keys' Dan Auerbach".

"Music to Watch Boys To" contains a "narcotic haze" according to Alex Hudson of Exclaim!; Hudson stated that the song is built over a synth orchestrations, with flute-like sounds and "crawling" beats that serve as "the sultry backdrop for the vocalist cooing breathily about pink flamingos and creepy, destructive romance". "Terrence Loves You" has been described as "hypnotic", with Del Rey singing over piano, strings, and a "moaning" saxophone. The song contains an interpolation of the song "Space Oddity" by English singer-songwriter David Bowie from his eponymous second studio album. The song opens with isolated guitar notes plucked and dropped, before moving into the distance as piano chords appear, followed by violins, and Del Rey's vocals. The chorus is delivered in an operatic style and lyrically talks about strength in the face of abandonment. Throughout the chorus there are brief saxophone sections inserted and David Bowie references with lyrics such as "Ground control to Major Tom/Can you hear me all night long?".

"God Knows I Tried" features guitar backing with layered harmonised vocals, with lyrics that touch upon Del Rey's struggles with fame and finding relief away from the public eye. "High by the Beach" is a hip hop-influenced synth-led, trap-pop song. Relatively upbeat and structurally sedate, it serves as a combination of all Del Rey's musical styles, particularly recalling the hip hop and trip hop influences of Born to Die (2012). It is more uptempo and pop-indebted than her previous releases, and is based around laidback, airy electronic production and a swooning orchestral arrangement. The song comprises a slow and clear trap beat, prominent, dreamy synth beeps, hip hop-influenced percussions and Roland TR-808 drums; in contrast with brooding, eerie organ instrumentation, pertaining to an additional slow and airy feel. The drums were noted to put emphasis on its hi-hat. "Freak" contains a steady bass thump and lyrics about drugs that have been compared to the work of the Weeknd. Amy Davidson of Digital Spy noted the song had a similar "sultriness" to that of "High by the Beach", Davidson continued to call the song a "slow motion" and compared it to a '90s R&B song. In a review for The Guardian Kitty Empire noted the song contained trip hop beats with lyrics that celebrate California. "Art Deco" is a slow jazz-styled ballad with hazy beats and saxophone riffs, the lyrics of the song contain "hollowness and American ennui". "Art Deco" was rumored to be about rapper Azealia Banks. Del Rey dismissed these allegations in an interview with NME, saying that the song "is actually about a group of teenagers who go out every night."

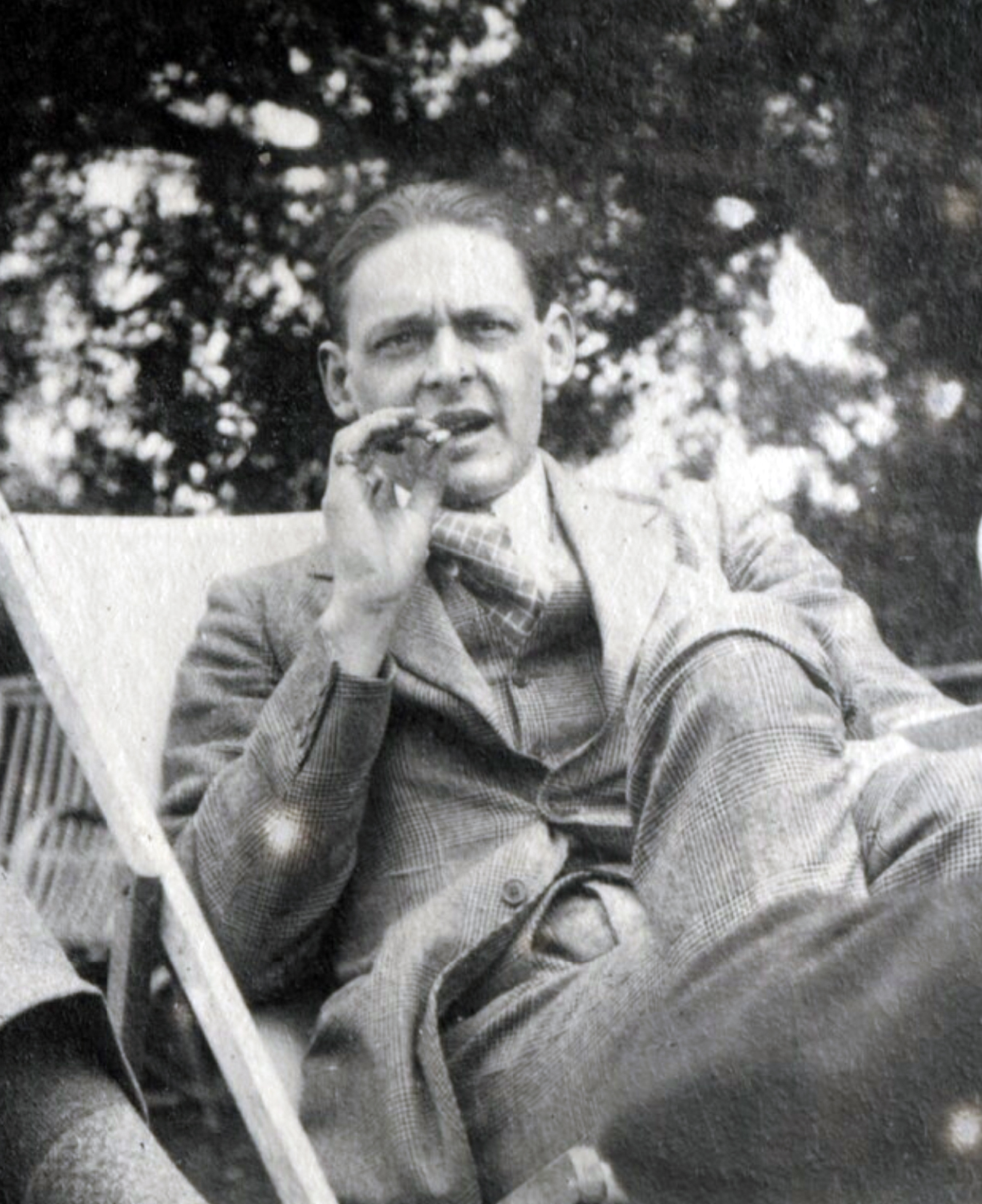
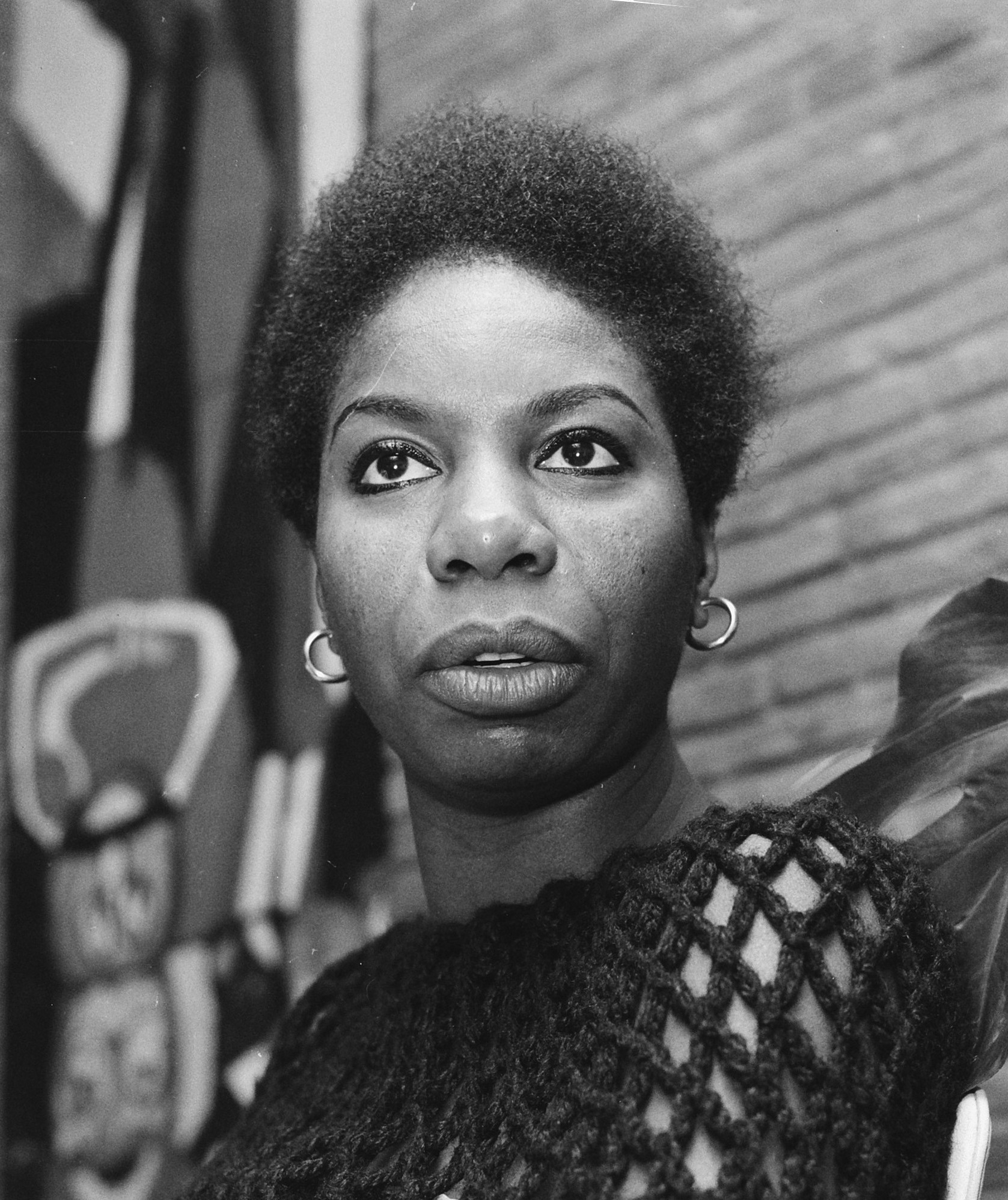
The eighth track on the album, "Burnt Norton (Interlude)", hears Del Rey reciting an extract of the first poem from T. S. Eliot's Four Quartets, while the closing track is a cover of Nina Simone's "Don't Let Me Be Misunderstood".

The eighth track on the album is an interlude entitled "Burnt Norton (Interlude)", the short spoken-word piece features Del Rey reciting an extract of the first poem from T. S. Eliot's Four Quartets, which speaks about the nature of time, and meditates on the idea of fate, with an underlying suggestion our present experiences are out of our control. The words are recited over an art rock instrumental production. "Religion" was noted as being one of Del Rey's most optimistic love songs, however the song was also noted for still be "tinged with the singer's favourite kind of noirish self-destruction". Lyrics that were noted for being optimistic were; "Everything is bright now" but this lyric is immediately followed with resignation "No need to survive now". "Salvatore" mixes violins, military drumbeats and verses sung in Italian which have been described as evoking "1940s Italy via Frank Sinatra". Lyrically, the track was seen as a sequel to "Summertime Sadness" with lyrics such as "Summer's hot but I've been cold without you". "Salvatore" was described as a two-step song by Nina Corcoran of Consequence of Sound, Corcoran noted the song sound as being "straight out of a resort hotel ballroom" before to continuing to describe the track as having jazz drums with "clean and rich" production.

"The Blackest Day" is a post-breakup ballad, that primarily deals with the stages of grief. The first verse explores themes of denial, apparent in lyrics such as "I don't really wanna break up, we got it going on". The second stage of grief, anger, is exemplified by the tone of the bridge: "You should've known better, than to have, to let her, get you under her spell of the weather". The second verse shows Del Rey bargaining: "Carry me home, don't wanna talk about the things to come/Just put your hands up in the air, the radio on", before Del Rey reaches the point of acceptance in the outro: "I'm on my own again". "24" is a cinematic song that received comparison to the James Bond theme songs, due to its musical style and lyrics which were noted as being sung from the perspective of a Bond girl. In May 2024, it was revealed that the producers of the Bond film Spectre (2015) rejected "24" as the film's theme song, opting instead to use Sam Smith's "Writing's on the Wall". "Swan Song" is a smooth, elegant theatrical song, that contains humming and low beats, with tragic lyrics that hear Del Rey repeatedly whisper "I will never sing again" and contains themes of Del Rey pleasing to run away from responsibility. The album closes with a cover of Nina Simone's "Don't Let Me Be Misunderstood", which showcase Del Rey's operatic readings of classical '60s Hollywood melodrama and contains organ riffs.

== Packaging and artwork ==
The album's cover artwork was photographed by Del Rey's sister, Caroline "Chuck" Grant, and features Del Rey posed on a Starline tour bus, a sightseeing bus system in Los Angeles that tours the city. As part of a promotional gimmick, the 1-800 phone number displayed on the side of the bus was answered with clips of tracks from the album when called, and on some occasions, Del Rey herself answered the phone to talk with fans.

Originally, Del Rey had collaborated with photographer Neil Krug on a cover for the album, and taken a series of photos. "The pictures were perfect, but something was missing," Del Rey commented in a 2015 interview. "Maybe it was the need for movement and motion or the search for a single frame that felt extra graphic." The liner notes to the CD and vinyl releases, however, still feature additional photography by Krug.

In addition to compact disc, the album was also released as a double LP pressed on black vinyl. An exclusive limited edition double LP was also released by Urban Outfitters, pressed on translucent red vinyl; the release also features alternate cover art showing a close-up of Del Rey wearing a sun hat, taken by Krug.

== Release and promotion ==
Lana Del Rey suggested in May 2015 that Honeymoon would be released in September, and confirmed on August 14 that the release date was scheduled for September 18. In June 2015, she had created a separate Instagram account solely for the album with the username "honeymoon". She unveiled the track listing through her main Instagram account on August 20, the day before the record was made available for preorder on the iTunes Store. Unlike her previous studio albums, which were released in several deluxe versions with extended track listings, Honeymoon is packaged as a single 14-track recording. The album's title track was released to YouTube on July 14, 2015, accompanied by a video with a short clip of Del Rey along with the song's lyrics, as well as releasing the album artwork, tracklist and pre-order.

Del Rey also released a promotional single, "Terrence Loves You", on August 21, 2015. The song had previously been accessible by calling Del Rey's Honeymoon Hotline, via the number present on the album cover. Additionally, the Honeymoon Hotline played the track "Burnt Norton (Interlude)" upon immediate connection to the number. The hotline would provide weekly updates on the album, as well as lectures chosen by Del Rey. On September 9, Apple Music's Beats Radio 1 station premiered "Music to Watch Boys To" two days ahead of its release as the third promotional single. The following day, Del Rey released a sampler of Honeymoon, which included the tracks "Terrence Loves You", "Music to Watch Boys To", "Freak", and "High by the Beach".

Del Rey did not promote the album with television performances or interviews, instead relying on a couple of print interviews, music videos, fan meets, and social media. Urban Outfitters held an early listening event on September 12 in select stores. Post the listening session, low-quality recordings of all the tracks from the album were leaked onto the Internet. On September 15, BBC Radio 1 premiered "Salvatore" and briefly interviewed Del Rey for Huw Stephens' (in place of Annie Mac's) Hottest Record in the World show. Following the release of Honeymoon, Del Rey hosted 3 meet-and-greets in late September at select Urban Outfitters stores to promote the record. On February 9, 2016, she held a music video premiere for the song "Freak" at The Wiltern, in Los Angeles.

== Critical reception ==
Professional ratings
Aggregate scores
Source	Rating
AnyDecentMusic?	7.3/10
Metacritic	78/100
Review scores
Source	Rating
AllMusic	3.5/5 stars
Consequence of Sound	B−
The Daily Telegraph	4/5 stars
Entertainment Weekly	B+
The Guardian	4/5 stars
The Independent	4/5 stars
NME	4/5
Pitchfork	7.5/10
Rolling Stone	4/5 stars
Spin	7/10

Honeymoon received positive reviews upon release. At the review aggregate website Metacritic, it has scored a 78 out of 100, based on 31 critics, becoming Del Rey's most acclaimed album of her career at the time.

The Independent gave Honeymoon four out of five stars, with reviewer Andy Gill writing that the album "finds Del Rey reverting, after the more atomised, individual characters of last year's Ultraviolence, to a composite persona closer to the dissolute subject of her Born to Die debut. Not only does her vocal delivery remain the same throughout, but also its protagonist's "voice"; while the emotional impact of what might sometimes be traumatic developments seems somehow damped, as if experienced through a narcotised haze". The Guardian, also giving the album four out of five stars, commented that "there's a timelessness to Honeymoon, and an intrigue that should linger longer than her previous LPs". PopMatters praised the album, saying "Producing three major-label albums in four years has developed Lana Del Rey into an artistic innovator who fearlessly draws from style and substance across the past century, whose vision is completely original and not remotely predictable". Rolling Stone shared similar thoughts in regards to the strength of the album, saying that "whatever her intentions, they've led to her most genuinely thrilling music ever." Jessica Hopper of Pitchfork gave the album a positive review, calling it her "most artistic" work yet, adding: "It is a dark work, darker even than Ultraviolence. While she's obviously a pop artist, Honeymoon feels as though it belongs to a larger canon of Southern California Gothic albums, and synthesizes ideas she's been vamping on from the beginning into a unified work."

The Daily Telegraph awarded the album four out of five stars, and called it "an ambient album for broken-hearted hipsters" and praised the melodies and arrangements on the album. USA Today believed the album "shows that Del Rey's sound has evolved and matured in captivating ways", while giving a three-out-of-four-stars review for the album. In a four-star review, The Metropolist thought "Del Rey has found a balance in sounds" and praised how the album's production "beautifully harmonises lush strings, muddy baselines and haunting melodies, all blending to create a fluent and ethereal body of work". The London Evening Standard also praised the album's production, remarking how it "swells in time to the oceans of longing in Del Rey's voice". Robert Christgau complimented her "third album" as a "subtle" evolution from her previous releases, showcasing "the torchy femme fatale who always lurked underneath".

Mojo named the record album of the week, and reviewer Tom Doyle deemed it "an assured refinement of [Del Rey's] style" and her "best [album] yet," though noting: "From here, Del Rey will surely be forced to redraw the blueprint." Sam Mac of Slant Magazine gave the album a middling review, noting: "It's the first album Del Rey has failed to find some kind of dynamic shape for," and ultimately deemed it a "wildly uneven sprawl."

=== Year-end lists ===
Publication	Accolade	Rank
Billboard	25 Best Albums of 2015	21
NME	NME's Albums of the Year 2015	7
Rolling Stone	50 Best Albums of 2015	12
Rolling Stone	20 Best Pop Albums of 2015	2
Rolling Stone	Rob Sheffield's Top 20 Albums of 2015	14
Spin	The 50 Best Albums of 2015	18
The Telegraph	The Best Pop and Rock Albums of 2015	Unranked
San Jose Mercury News	Top 10 Albums of 2015	4
The New York Times	Top 10 Albums of 2015 by Jon Caramanica	9
Newsweek	Top 20 Albums of 2015	12
Consumer Guide	2015 Dean's List	30

== Commercial performance ==
Honeymoon debuted at number two on the US Billboard 200, moving 116,000 album-equivalent units, 105,000 of which were pure album sales while the rest is a mixture track equivalent albums (TEA) and streaming equivalent albums (SEA). The album dropped to number 15 the following week. The album is certified gold in the US for selling over 500,000 units. In Australia, the album debuted at number one on the ARIA Charts, becoming Del Rey's third consecutive number one following Born to Die and Ultraviolence, which both spent one week at the top of the charts. In France, Honeymoon has sold 50,000 copies. In December 2015, Honeymoon was certified Silver in the United Kingdom and then certified Gold in March 2017.

Two singles were released from the album—"High by the Beach" on August 10, 2015, and "Music to Watch Boys To" on September 11, 2015. "High by the Beach", the lead single, debuted at number 51 on the Billboard Hot 100, though Billboard initially reported it at number 7, which was corrected after a miscalculation.

== Track listing ==
All tracks are written by Lana Del Rey and Rick Nowels, except where noted; all tracks produced by Del Rey, Nowels and Kieron Menzies.

No.	Title	Writer(s)	Length
1.	"Honeymoon"		5:50
2.	"Music to Watch Boys To"		4:51
3.	"Terrence Loves You"		4:51
4.	"God Knows I Tried"		4:40
5.	"High by the Beach"	Del Rey; Nowels; Menzies	4:18
6.	"Freak"		4:55
7.	"Art Deco"		4:55
8.	"Burnt Norton" (Interlude)	T. S. Eliot	1:21
9.	"Religion"		5:23
10.	"Salvatore"		4:41
11.	"The Blackest Day"		6:05
12.	"24"		4:56
13.	"Swan Song"		5:23
14.	"Don't Let Me Be Misunderstood"	Sol Marcus; Bennie Benjamin; Gloria Caldwell	3:02
Total length:			65:06

== Personnel ==
- Lana Del Rey – vocals (all tracks); Mellotron (track 6)
- Rick Nowels – acoustic guitar (tracks 1, 10); electric guitar (tracks 2, 4, 6, 9, 10, 14); bass (tracks 1, 6, 7, 9, 10, 12, 13, 14); synthesizers (tracks 1–7, 9–13); mellotron (tracks 1, 4, 7, 9, 12, 14), piano (tracks 1–3, 10, 12); organ (tracks 1, 4, 5, 11, 13, 14); chamberlin (tracks 10, 13); electric piano (tracks 4, 12); keyboards (track 5); percussion (track 10); celesta (track 14)
- Kieron Menzies – synthesizers (tracks 5, 7, 11); drum programming (tracks 1, 2, 4–7, 9, 11, 13); synth bass (tracks 4–6, 11); percussion (tracks 2, 6, 7, 10); sampler (tracks 2, 4, 5, 11); effects (tracks 1, 3, 5); loops (tracks 9, 13); engineering
- Nicolas Essig – recording engineer (tracks 12)
- Patrick Warren – strings, winds, keyboards, programming
- Curt Bisquera – live drums
- Brian Griffin – drums
- Leon Michels – winds, keyboards, saxophone
- Derek "DJA" Allen – percussion
- Rusty Anderson – electric guitar, guitar effects
- David Levita – strings
- Roger Joseph Manning Jr. – bass, Omnichord
- Chris Garcia – engineering
- Trevor Yasuda – additional programming, engineering
- Phil Joly – assistant engineering
- Iris Sofia – assistant engineering
- Emerson Day Rhodes – assistant engineering
- Josh Tyrrell – assistant engineering

== Charts ==
=== Weekly charts ===
Chart (2015)	Peak position
Argentine Albums (CAPIF)	6
Australian Albums (ARIA)	1
Austrian Albums (Ö3 Austria)	4
Belgian Albums (Ultratop Flanders)	2
Belgian Albums (Ultratop Wallonia)	2
Brazilian Albums (ABPD)	2
Canadian Albums (Billboard)	3
Croatian Albums (HDU)	11
Czech Albums (ČNS IFPI)	6
Danish Albums (Hitlisten)	7
Dutch Albums (Album Top 100)	5
Finnish Albums (Suomen virallinen lista)	12
French Albums (SNEP)	3
German Albums (Offizielle Top 100)	4
Greek Albums (IFPI)	1
Hungarian Albums (MAHASZ)	14
Irish Albums (IRMA)	1
Italian Albums (FIMI)	2
Japanese Albums (Oricon)	100
Mexican Albums (AMPROFON)	2
New Zealand Albums (RMNZ)	2
Norwegian Albums (VG-lista)	6
Polish Albums (ZPAV)	3
Portuguese Albums (AFP)	2
Scottish Albums (Official Charts)	2
Slovak Albums (ČNS IFPI)	79
South Korean Albums (Circle)	45
South Korean International Albums (Circle)	5
Scottish Albums (Official Charts)	2
Spanish Albums (Promusicae)	4
Swedish Albums (Sverigetopplistan)	3
Swiss Albums (Schweizer Hitparade)	3
UK Albums (Official Charts)	2
UK Album Downloads (Official Charts)	1
UK Vinyl Albums	2
US Billboard 200	2
US Digital Albums (Billboard)	2
US Top Alternative Albums (Billboard)	1
US Indie Store Album Sales (Billboard)	1
US Vinyl Albums (Billboard)	1

=== Year-end charts ===
Chart (2015)	Position
Australian Albums (ARIA)	74
Belgian Albums (Ultratop Flanders)	75
Belgian Albums (Ultratop Wallonia)	72
French Albums (SNEP)	101
Mexican Albums (AMPROFON)	57
Swiss Albums (Swiss Hitparade)	77
UK Albums (OCC)	100
US Billboard 200	165
US Alternative Albums	16

Chart (2016)	Position
US Alternative Albums	39

== Certifications ==
Region	Certification	Certified units/sales
Australia (ARIA)	Gold	35,000^{‡}
Austria (IFPI Austria)	Gold	7,500^{*}
Canada (Music Canada)	Platinum	80,000^{‡}
Denmark (IFPI Danmark)	Gold	10,000^{‡}
France (SNEP)	Gold	50,000^{*}
Germany (BVMI)	Gold	100,000^{‡}
Italy (FIMI)	Gold	25,000^{‡}
New Zealand (RMNZ)	Platinum	15,000^{‡}
Poland (ZPAV)	2× Platinum	40,000^{‡}
United Kingdom (BPI)	Gold	100,000 ^{‡} / 126,078
United States (RIAA)	Gold	500,000^{‡}
^{*} Sales figures based on certification alone.^{‡} Sales+streaming figures based on certification alone.

== Release history ==
Country	Date	Format	Label	Ref.
Australia	September 18, 2015	CD; LP	Universal	
Canada	September 18, 2015	CD	Universal	
France	September 18, 2015	CD; LP	Polydor	
Germany	September 18, 2015	CD; LP	Vertigo Berlin	
Italy	September 18, 2015	CD; LP	Universal	
Poland	September 18, 2015	CD	Universal	
United Kingdom	September 18, 2015	CD; LP	Polydor	
United States	September 18, 2015	CD; LP	Interscope	
United Kingdom	September 23, 2015	LP	Polydor	
Canada	25 September 2015	LP	Universal	
Japan	25 September 2015	CD	Universal	
Germany	25 September 2015	LP	Vertigo Berlin	
Poland	25 September 2015	LP	Universal	
Poland	29 September 2015	LP	Universal	
France	September 30, 2015	LP	Polydor	
Italy	2 October 2015	LP	Universal	
United States	November 20, 2015	Box set	Interscope	
France	December 4, 2015	Box set	Polydor	
Germany	December 11, 2015	Box set	Universal	
Poland	December 11, 2015	Box set	Universal	

== See also ==
- List of number-one albums of 2015 (Australia)
- List of number-one albums of 2015 (Ireland)
