= Honeymoon (Lana Del Rey song) =

Promotional single by Lana Del Rey

from the album Honeymoon
- Released: September 7, 2015
- Studio: The Green Building (Santa Monica, CA)
- Genre: Baroque pop; blue-eyed soul
- Length: 5:50
- Label: Polydor; Interscope
- Songwriters: Lana Del Rey; Rick Nowels
- Producers: Del Rey; Nowels; Kieron Menzies

Lana Del Rey promotional singles chronology
"Terrence Loves You" (2015)	"Honeymoon" (2015)	"Coachella – Woodstock in My Mind" (2017)

Official audio
- "Honeymoon" on YouTube

"Honeymoon" is a song by American singer and songwriter Lana Del Rey co-written by Rick Nowels. It was uploaded to her YouTube channel on July 14, 2015 and was released for purchase as the second promotional single on September 7, 2015 from her fourth studio album of the same name.

== Composition ==
It's been labelled as a baroque pop and blue-eyed soul song by critics. One reviewer described "Honeymoon" as a ballad that frames the concepts of the overall album: "The title track opens the album with a cello moan and high, creeping violins and then floats for nearly six minutes as Del Rey promises glorious, aimless freedom. But she sounds utterly alone. You suspect she’s singing to someone who’s long gone." The song features sparse instrumental arrangements from a piano, a violin, and cello.

== Release history ==
Prior to the release, the lyrics to the song were released as part of a lyric book, which was available for purchase among the merchandise for The Endless Summer Tour. Del Rey then posted two snippets of the song on her Instagram accounts. The song was finally released in a lyric video, which was uploaded on her official YouTube channel on July 14, 2015. The song was released through digital download on September 7, 2015.

== Music video ==
The music video for "Honeymoon" was directed and edited by Del Rey. When asked if she was going to release it, Del Rey expressed, "You haven't seen the full video for 'Honeymoon' because I didn't put it out yet. I don't know if I will because I made it myself." Del Rey didn't reveal the video because "nothing really happened in it". It leaked on the internet in July 2016, surfacing on YouTube. The video, shot on VHS, features close-ups of Del Rey applying makeup in front of a vanity, and walking along a poolside and through a grassy lawn; interspersed is footage of a tiger.

== Reception ==
"Honeymoon" received critical acclaim. NME called the track "cinematic" and "emotionally thrilling" before describing it as "perhaps her most heart-stopping ballad yet". The Verge described the song as "six minutes of meandering bliss" and praised the "sweeping strings and stuttering snares" that "float through the background of the song", but also identified that, "like much of Lana Del Rey's work, the core of its appeal is in her voice." TIME called the song "characteristically broody" and "cinematic", and suggested it "leans closer to the sounds of her breakthrough LP Born to Die than the material she cooked up with the Black Keys' Dan Auderbach". However, a reviewer for the Australian publication StereoNET disagreed, stating that the material sounded akin to that on Ultraviolence.

The Independent praised the song, calling it "melancholic and beautiful". Billboard said the song was "grander and more ambitious than anything the singer-songwriter has released thus far", describing it as "epic".

== Charts ==
Chart (2015)	Peak position
France (SNEP)	154
