= Terrence Loves You =

Promotional single by Lana Del Rey

from the album Honeymoon
- Released: August 21, 2015
- Studio: The Green Building (Santa Monica, CA)
- Genre: Lounge
- Length: 4:51
- Label: Interscope; Polydor
- Songwriters: Lana Del Rey; Rick Nowels
- Producers: Del Rey; Nowels; Kieron Menzies

Lana Del Rey promotional singles chronology
"Black Beauty" (2014)	"Terrence Loves You" (2015)	"Honeymoon" (2015)

Official audio
- "Terrence Loves You" on YouTube

"Terrence Loves You" is a song recorded by American singer and songwriter Lana Del Rey for her album Honeymoon (2015). It was released as the album's first promotional single on August 21, 2015. Written by Del Rey and Rick Nowels, the song has been described as "hypnotic", with Del Rey singing over piano, strings, and a "moaning" saxophone. The song contains an interpolation of the song "Space Oddity" by English singer-songwriter David Bowie from his eponymous second studio album. Del Rey stated that the song is her favorite from Honeymoon, describing it as "jazzy".

== Background and release ==
The song premiered via Del Rey's "Honeymoon Hotline", a hotline set up for fans to receive updates on the album directly from Del Rey herself, as well as have access to other content, such as lectures. On August 21, 2015, the official audio was uploaded to Del Rey's Vevo channel. The same day, "Terrence Loves You" was made available in digital download.

== Composition ==
"Terrence Loves You" is a lounge ballad. It has been described as "hypnotic", with Del Rey singing over piano, strings, and a "moaning" saxophone. The song contains an interpolation of the song "Space Oddity" by English singer-songwriter David Bowie from his eponymous second studio album. The song opens with isolated guitar notes plucked and dropped, before moving into the distance as piano chords appear, followed by violins, and, Del Rey's vocals. The chorus is delivered in an operatic style and lyrically talks about strength in the face of abandonment. Throughout the chorus, there are brief saxophone sections inserted and Bowie references with lyrics such as "Ground control to Major Tom/ Can you hear me all night long?".

== Critical reception ==
Rolling Stone called the song "hypnotic" and praised Del Rey's vocal performance.

== Charts ==
Chart (2015)	Peak position
France (SNEP)	128
UK Singles (OCC)	188
