= High by the Beach =

2015 single by Lana Del Rey

Single by Lana Del Rey

from the album Honeymoon
- Released: August 10, 2015
- Recorded: 2015
- Studio: The Green Building (Santa Monica, CA)
- Genre: Power pop; trap-pop
- Length: 4:17
- Label: Interscope; Polydor
- Songwriters: Lana Del Rey; Rick Nowels; Kieron Menzies
- Producers: Lana Del Rey; Rick Nowels; Kieron Menzies

Lana Del Rey singles chronology
"Wait for Life" (2015)	"High by the Beach" (2015)	"Music to Watch Boys To" (2015)

Music video
- "High by the Beach" on YouTube

"High by the Beach" is a song recorded by American singer-songwriter, and record producer Lana Del Rey for her fourth studio album, Honeymoon (2015). Written by Del Rey, Rick Nowels, and Kieron Menzies, it was released as the lead single from the album on August 10, 2015. A synth-led trap-pop and power pop ballad, it is more uptempo and pop-indebted than Del Rey's previous releases but prominently recalls the hip hop and trip hop influences of her 2012 album, Born to Die. The song is based around electronic production, a trap beat, and an orchestral organ arrangement.

"High by the Beach" received widespread acclaim, with critics praising the song's production, Del Rey's vocals and cited it as more radio-friendly than her previous songs. It debuted at number 51 on the Billboard Hot 100 a week after its release, spending three weeks on the chart altogether. The song also ranked at number 89 in Triple J's Hottest 100 songs of 2015 in Australia.

== Background ==
"High by the Beach" was written by Lana Del Rey, Rick Nowels, and Kieron Menzies and was recorded as one of the last tracks for Del Rey's Honeymoon. Its development began with its chorus, which was inspired by a period when Lana Del Rey frequently drove by the beach. In an interview for Apple Music's Beats 1, she said: "It had an Andrews Sisters vibe. The harmony sounded almost monotone. It had this weird drone to it, but with this beat it had a trap aspect".

== Composition ==
"High by the Beach" is a synth-led power pop and trap-pop ballad. Relatively upbeat and structurally sedate, it serves as a combination of all Del Rey's musical styles, particularly recalling the hip hop and trip hop influences of Born to Die (2012). It is more uptempo and pop-indebted than her previous releases and is based around laidback, airy electronic production and swooning orchestral arrangement. The song comprises a slow and clear trap beat; prominent, dreamy synth beeps; hip hop-influenced percussions; and Roland TR-808 drums, with contrasting brooding, eerie organ instrumentation, delivering a slow and airy feel. The drums were noted to put emphasis on its hi-hat.

"High by the Beach"
A 24-second sample of "High by the Beach" featuring a portion of its chorus which transitions into its bridge with the lyrics "Lights, camera, acción / I'll do it on my own".

The song opens with the sound of waves lapping on a beach shore and a melancholy set of vintage California church keys. The chorus pivots into a whiny bounce, over rolling minimal electronics, on which Lana Del Rey nonchalantly coos the repeated hook, "All I wanna do is get high by the beach, get high by the beach, get high", later syncopated by the lyric, "The truth is I never bought into your bullshit/ When you would pay tribute to me". El Hunt of DIY writes, "The chorus is oddly paced, half a leg behind [the production] like it's just quaffed a glass of white wine and a sedative". Del Rey sings with a wispy, hazy, breathy vocal, also using a combination of crooning and rapping techniques, and prominent harmonies in the song. Her vocals were noted to be coy and saccharine in delivery and in an octave just above a whisper throughout. Leonie Cooper of NME noted, "Densely produced, her vocals are doubled and then doubled again, so it sounds like there's a gang of four lispy Lanas serenading the listener". According to Patrick Hosken of MTV News, Del Rey's vocals in the song are "patented distant" and sound "like she recorded them via a tin can tied to a shoe lace". While Randall Roberts of the Los Angeles Times said it sounded "like she vaped a gram of Girl Scout Cookies before her vocal take".

Lyrically, "High by the Beach" is a self-assured kiss-off torch song containing several lyrical themes, including self-deprecation, nihilism, independence, and indolence. A representation of the challenges of staying in love, it specifically details Del Rey being worn down by life and love, and in turn seeking sweet escape near the ocean to enjoy recreational drug use. Also an evisceration of an unworthy ex-lover, it features Del Rey lashing out in anger, telling her former partner, "Don't need your money, money to get me what I want / Lights, camera, acción / I'll do it on my own"—a reference to her early track "Put Me in a Movie" (2010). According to Jessica Goodman of Entertainment Weekly, the song is "a tongue-in-cheek meditation discarding the extra folks in your life, and quite literally, getting high by the beach". Goodman noted that with the lyric, "You could be a bad motherfucker, but that don't make you a man. Now you're just another one of my problems because you got out of hand/ We won't survive, we're sinking into the sand," Del Rey "throws an old lover under the bus". Erin Jensen of USA Today viewed it as a "bitter breakup ballad", while Hosken suggested that the song "could just represent a rough patch in an overall dramatic but very intense relationship". Hunt said that the lyrics were deceptive, writing, "Sacking off no good men, money-slinging bullshitters, and empty tributes in favour of beachy hedonism on 'High By The Beach,' this song is really a song about reveling in the escape of being yourself". Del Rey's atypically assertive lyrics in the song drew comparisons to Rihanna's "Bitch Better Have My Money" (2015).

== Release ==
"High by the Beach" is the lead single from Honeymoon. On August 4, 2015, Del Rey announced the single's release date (August 10) and revealed its accompanying cover art on Instagram. The artwork was shot by Del Rey's younger sister, Chuck Grant. Her make-up was done by Pamela Cochrane, her hair by Anna Cafone, and her wardrobe by Johnny Blueeyes. The cover art is pastel in color and features Del Rey in a silk dress standing atop a dock next to a miniature model sailboat. Natalie Weiner of Billboard opined that the cover suggested that the song's title "may be fairly self-explanatory". Brennan Carley of Spin said that Del Rey was "gorgeously rendered" in the artwork. Emily Manning of Vice deemed the cover art "nautically nostalgic" and wrote, "It's something of a departure from the singer's previously dark aesthetic, which has served as ample inspiration for online movements of sad girls and Tumblr goths".

On August 8, "High by the Beach" leaked online two days ahead of its release date; it was later reported Del Rey's label had managed to largely take down the leaks online. Del Rey shared the track's official audio on August 10, with an official premiere on Apple Music's Beats 1 at 09:30 PST (17:30 BST) and on BBC Radio 1 at 11:30 PST (19:30 BST). The same day, "High by the Beach" was made available as a digital download pre-order with a new release date of August 12; however, the new release date was pulled and "High by the Beach" was digitally released on August 10 as originally planned.

== Critical reception ==
"High by the Beach" received critical acclaim. Jason Lipshutz of Billboard deemed it "perhaps the most radio-friendly song of [Del Rey's] entire career", and praised the "gloriously whiny bounce" of its chorus and "sparkling Lana wisdom" in its lyrics. Similarly, Slant Magazine's Sal Cinquemani said, "Though it's an understated single by today's pop standards, [...], it's handily Del Rey's catchiest single since 'Summertime Sadness', or at least 'National Anthem'". Cinquemani also complimented Del Rey's "crisp" vocal and the track's "hypnotic" synth line, and quipped, "lazy, revenge- and smoke-filled summer days never sounded so sweet". Jessica Goodman of Entertainment Weekly deemed it Del Rey's catchiest single yet, praising its "surprising" hip hop elements. Writing in Time, Nolan Feeney said that "High by the Beach" was Del Rey's "poppiest song in a while" and highlighted its "skittering beat and dizzying hook". Feeney's view was echoed by Constant Gardner of Pigeons & Planes who felt "High by the Beach" was "a pop song surely destined for radio play". Stereogum's Peter Helman found "High by the Beach" to be "positively fun" and "probably the straight-up catchiest thing she's done in a while", complimenting its "sultry keys" and the "refreshing independence" of its lyrics. Rory Cashin of State also felt the song was "far more commercially minded" and added, "if it wasn't for that title and the heavy drug references, we'd imagine this would fit quite snuggly on the charts and radio rotation".

Patrick Hosken of MTV News commented, "Lana's knack for capturing summer in songs is on point here". Similarly, HitFix's Marcus Ezra stated that the track proved that Del Rey "knows how to do summer right", and praised its drum instrumentation which he felt lent the song "a harder edge". Writing in New York, Jillian Mapes called the song "sonic perfection" and a late contender for the "Song of the Summer", and opined that it indicated that Del Rey "hasn't abandoned her whole 'gangster Nancy Sinatra' thing, and it might not want to make you cringe anymore". Mapes also commended the track's "several anthemic lines" and felt that despite it "reaching peak Sad Girl nihilism", it worked as "a chilled-out trap-pop single you can blast as a comedown from 'Bitch Better Have My Money'". Tommy Pisani of Out called the song a "new 420 anthem" and said its "strong harmonies" turned it into "the perfect end-of-summer jam". NME writer Leonie Cooper lauded the song as the "Slow-Burning Sound Of Late Summer". Robin Murray of Clash opined that it was a "gorgeous, hazy summer hymn".

Yasmeen Gharnit of Nylon opined that Del Rey had "perhaps delivered her greatest hazy anthem". Ian David Monroe of V wrote that the song marked "an evolved artist" and "sultry Lana at her best", and complimented its "surprising" trap beat. Paper writer Sandra Song deemed the ballad "an absolute stunner", commending Del Rey's "otherworldly" voice and highlighting the song's "most melancholy set of vintage California church keys you could imagine". Jack Russell of American Songwriter called it "an interesting sound" and "everything and nothing like what we've come to expect from [Del Rey]". El Hunt of DIY praised the song's "unapologetic" production and Del Rey's coy, saccharine delivery which he felt lent itself to "one of the best deliveries of 'bullshit' this year". While Laura Bradley of Slate wrote, "Now, as the title suggests, all she wants to do is get high by the beach, and it's hard to resist coming along for the ride".

Rolling Stone ranked "High By the Beach" at number 18 on its year-end list of the 50 best songs of 2015. Pitchfork ranked the song at number 75 on its year-end list of the 100 best songs of 2015.

== Commercial performance ==
Due to an error in calculation by Nielsen, "High by the Beach" was originally reported to have debuted on the Billboard Hot 100 chart at number 7 with 248,000 copies sold. The error was corrected on the issue dated August 29, 2015, and the song was revealed to have debuted and peaked at number 51 on the Hot 100, and number 10 on the Digital Songs chart with 67,000 copies. The song dropped 14 places to number 65 in its second week, and fell to number 97 by its third week.

"High by the Beach" was also a minor success in the United Kingdom, peaking at number 60 on the UK Singles Chart.

== Music video ==
On August 9, 2015, Del Rey posted a promotional image from the accompanying Jake Nava-directed music video for "High by the Beach" on Instagram. On August 10, Del Rey shared a short clip of the music video on Instagram. On August 12, Del Rey shared a 15-second video preview on Instagram and announced that the full music video will be released on August 13.

=== Synopsis ===
The video is primarily shot in a hand-held camera technique with very little editing or cuts. The video begins with Del Rey wearing a low-cut white sundress over a black bra and a sea glass blue robe entering a beach house as a paparazzi helicopter hovers above her. After entering the house, the camera follows Del Rey from behind as she walks upstairs, posing in front of a mirror and collapsing on her bed, rolling around on it. The camera continues to follow her downstairs where she begins flipping through the pages of a tabloid. As the camera moves in front of her, the helicopter reappears closer to the house, hovering in front of the windows. A photographer takes photos of Del Rey and he and the rest of the paparazzi surround her with the helicopter's wind. Del Rey then runs outside onto the beach and pulls out a guitar case from beneath a pile of rocks. When she returns to the balcony, she opens the case and removes a large rocket launcher from it. She turns towards the helicopter and destroys it with the weapon, killing the paparazzi. In the aftermath of the explosion, flaming pieces of tabloid articles flutter through the air as Del Rey lowers the rocket launcher and re-enters the beach house.

=== Accolades ===
Publication	Accolade	Rank
Pitchfork	Best 20 Music Videos of 2015	10
Stereogum	The 50 Best Music Videos of 2015	12
Teen Vogue	The 11 Best Music Videos of 2015	–
Popcrush	Best Music Videos of 2015	–
Time	Top 10 Pop Music Videos of 2015	10
Cosmopolitan	Best Plot Twist: High By The Beach	–

== Track listing ==
- Digital download
1. "High by the Beach" – 4:17

== Charts ==
Chart (2015)	Peak position
Australia (ARIA)	51
Austria (Ö3 Austria Top 40)	56
Belgium (Ultratop 50 Flanders)	46
Belgium (Ultratop 50 Wallonia)	16
Canada Hot 100 (Billboard)	39
CIS Airplay (TopHit)	130
France (SNEP)	14
Germany (GfK)	75
Hungary (Single Top 40)	23
Ireland (IRMA)	59
Israel (Media Forest)	4
Italy (FIMI)	93
Sweden Heatseeker (Sverigetopplistan)	1
Switzerland (Schweizer Hitparade)	58
UK Singles (Official Charts)	60
US Billboard Hot 100	51

== Certifications ==
Certifications for "High by the Beach"
Region	Certification	Certified units/sales
Australia (ARIA)	Platinum	70,000^{‡}
Brazil (Pro-Música Brasil)	Platinum	60,000^{‡}
New Zealand (RMNZ)	Gold	15,000^{‡}
Poland (ZPAV)	Gold	25,000^{‡}
United Kingdom (BPI)	Silver	200,000^{‡}
United States (RIAA)	Platinum	1,000,000^{‡}
^{‡} Sales+streaming figures based on certification alone.

== Release history ==
Release dates and formats for "High by the Beach"
Region	Date	Format	Label	Ref.
Various	August 10, 2015	Digital download	Interscope	
Italy	August 28, 2015	Radio airplay	Universal	

== See also ==
- Drug use in music
