= Lana Del Rey discography =

Discography of American singer-songwriter

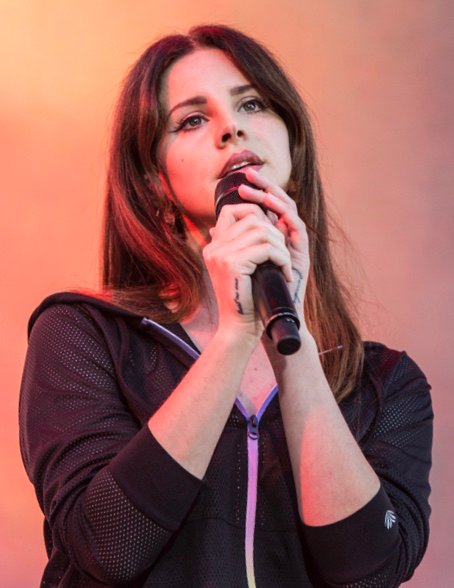
- Lana Del Rey performing at KROQ Weenie Roast in 2017
- Studio albums: 9
- Extended plays: 4
- Singles: 55
- Reissues: 1
- Box sets: 2
- Promotional singles: 17
- Audiobooks: 1

American singer-songwriter Lana Del Rey has released nine studio albums, four extended plays (EPs), 54 singles (including 11 as a featured artist), 17 promotional singles, and two box sets. She has sold over 77 million records and has garnered over 58 billion streams worldwide. In the United States, Del Rey has earned 55 million certified units across albums and singles from the Recording Industry Association of America (RIAA). With over 25.9 million certified units from the British Phonographic Industry (BPI), she is one of the best-selling female music artists in the United Kingdom.

Del Rey signed a record deal with 5 Points Records in 2007. Through 5 Points, she released her debut EP, Kill Kill (2008), under the name Lizzy Grant, and her debut studio album, Lana Del Ray (2010). Lana Del Ray has been pulled from music stores because 5 Points was unable to fund it. In 2011, Del Rey self-released her debut single, "Video Games", which reached the top ten and received certifications in many European countries, including double platinum certifications in Germany (where it reached number one) and Switzerland. "Video Games" was certified triple platinum in the US.

In 2012, Del Rey signed a joint record deal with Interscope and Polydor Records and released her second studio album, Born to Die, which contained "Video Games". Born to Die peaked at number two on the US Billboard 200 and reached number one in Australia and many European countries. By 2014, the album had sold one million copies in the US and seven million copies worldwide. It spawned five other singles: "Born to Die", "Blue Jeans", "Summertime Sadness", "National Anthem", and "Dark Paradise". "Summertime Sadness" reached the top ten in various countries worldwide and was supported by a remix by Cedric Gervais, which peaked at number six in the US, becoming Del Rey's first top-ten single. In Australia and the US, "Born to Die", "Blue Jeans", and "Summertime Sadness" were certified multi-platinum, with "National Anthem" and "Dark Paradise" receiving platinum certifications. In 2025, Born to Die became the longest-charting album by a female artist in Billboard 200 history.

Del Rey released an EP, Paradise, and a reissue of Born to Die, Born to Die: The Paradise Edition, in late 2012. She recorded and released the singles "Young and Beautiful" and "Once Upon a Dream" for the soundtracks of The Great Gatsby (2013) and Maleficent (2014), respectively. "Young and Beautiful" was certified multi-platinum in Australia, New Zealand, the UK, and the US. Del Rey's third studio album, Ultraviolence (2014), was her first US Billboard 200 number one. It peaked atop the charts in Australia, Canada, New Zealand, and the UK. Ultraviolence spawned the singles "West Coast" (which was certified multi-platinum in Australia, New Zealand, and the US), "Shades of Cool", "Ultraviolence", and "Brooklyn Baby". Del Rey's fourth studio album, Honeymoon (2015), reached number one in Australia and Ireland and spawned the singles "High by the Beach" and "Music to Watch Boys To".

Del Rey's fifth studio album, Lust for Life (2017), was her second number-one album in the US, and peaked atop the charts in Australia, Canada, and the UK. Two of its singles, "Love" and "Lust for Life" (featuring the Weeknd), were certified platinum in Australia and the US. Del Rey's sixth studio album, Norman Fucking Rockwell! (2019), reached number one in Switzerland and the UK. One of its singles, "Doin' Time", was certified platinum in Australia, New Zealand, the UK, and the US. Del Rey's collaboration with Ariana Grande and Miley Cyrus, "Don't Call Me Angel" (2019) from the Charlie's Angels soundtrack, reached the top five in Australia, Ireland, Switzerland, and the UK. In 2020, she released a spoken word album for her debut poetry book, Violet Bent Backwards over the Grass. The next year, she released the albums Chemtrails over the Country Club and Blue Banisters. The former reached number one in Switzerland and the UK, and its title track received gold certifications in multiple countries worldwide.

Del Rey featured on Taylor Swift's single "Snow on the Beach" (2022), which reached the top five in Canada, Ireland, New Zealand, the UK, and the US. Her ninth studio album, Did You Know That There's a Tunnel Under Ocean Blvd (2023), peaked at number one in Australia, Ireland, New Zealand, and the UK. It spawned four singles: the title track, "A&W", "The Grants", and "Candy Necklace" (featuring Jon Batiste). She also released the single "Say Yes to Heaven" in 2023, which reached the top 20 on the Billboard Global 200 and was certified double platinum in Australia.

== Albums ==
=== Studio albums ===
List of studio albums, with selected chart positions, sales figures, and certifications
Title	Album details	Peak chart positions										Sales	Certifications
Title	Album details	US	AUS	AUT	CAN	FRA	GER	IRE	NZ	SWI	UK	Sales	Certifications
Lana Del Ray (Note: Also known as Lana Del Ray A.K.A. Lizzy Grant, the album was released under the stage name Lana Del Ray.)	Released: January 4, 2010; Label: 5 Points; Formats: Digital download	—	—	—	—	—	—	—	—	—	—		
Born to Die	Released: January 27, 2012; Label: Polydor, Interscope; Formats: CD, LP, digital download, streaming	2	1	1	3	1	1	1	2	1	1	US: 1,500,000 (Note: US sales figures for Born to Die as of January 2018); FRA: 1,000,000 (Note: France sales figures for albums as of September 2019); UK: 1,400,000 (Note: UK sales figures for albums as of March 2021)	RIAA: 5× Platinum; ARIA: 4× Platinum; BPI: 6× Platinum; BVMI: 5× Platinum; IFPI AUT: 5× Platinum; IFPI SWI: 2× Platinum; MC: 5× Platinum; RMNZ: 7× Platinum; SNEP: Diamond
Ultraviolence	Released: June 13, 2014; Label: Polydor, Interscope; Formats: CD, LP, digital download, streaming	1	1	5	1	2	3	2	1	2	1	US: 529,000 (Note: US sales figures for Ultraviolence as of September 2015.); FRA: 70,000; UK: 321,000	RIAA: Platinum; ARIA: Platinum; BPI: Platinum; BVMI: Gold; IFPI AUT: Platinum; MC: 2× Platinum; RMNZ: 2× Platinum; SNEP: Platinum
Honeymoon	Released: September 18, 2015; Label: Polydor, Interscope; Formats: CD, LP, digital download, streaming, cassette	2	1	4	3	3	4	1	2	3	2	FRA: 35,000 (Note: France sales figures for Honeymoon as of December 2015); UK: 140,000	RIAA: Gold; ARIA: Gold; BPI: Gold; BVMI: Gold; IFPI AUT: Gold; MC: Platinum; RMNZ: Platinum; SNEP: Gold
Lust for Life	Released: July 21, 2017; Label: Polydor, Interscope; Formats: CD, LP, digital download, streaming, cassette	1	1	5	1	2	8	2	2	2	1	UK: 134,000	RIAA: Gold; ARIA: Gold; BPI: Gold; BVMI: Gold; IFPI AUT: Gold; MC: Platinum; RMNZ: Platinum; SNEP: Gold
Norman Fucking Rockwell!	Released: August 30, 2019; Label: Polydor, Interscope; Formats: CD, LP, digital download, streaming, cassette	3	4	7	3	4	5	2	5	1	1	FRA: 31,000 (Note: France sales figures for Norman Fucking Rockwell! as of January 2020); UK: 225,000 (Note: UK sales figures as of March 2023.)	RIAA: Platinum; ARIA: Platinum; BPI: Platinum; BVMI: Gold; IFPI AUT: Platinum; MC: 2× Platinum; RMNZ: 2× Platinum
Chemtrails over the Country Club	Released: March 19, 2021; Label: Polydor, Interscope; Formats: CD, LP, digital download, streaming, cassette	2	2	4	5	3	3	2	2	1	1		BPI: Gold; MC: Gold; RMNZ: Gold; SNEP: Gold
Blue Banisters	Released: October 22, 2021; Label: Polydor, Interscope; Formats: CD, LP, digital download, streaming, cassette	8	3	8	10	7	6	4	8	6	2		BPI: Gold; MC: Gold; RMNZ: Gold
Did You Know That There's a Tunnel Under Ocean Blvd	Released: March 24, 2023; Label: Polydor, Interscope; Formats: CD, LP, digital download, streaming, cassette	3	1	4	3	2	3	1	1	4	1		BPI: Gold; MC: Gold; RMNZ: Gold; SNEP: Gold
Stove	Scheduled release: TBA; Label: Polydor, Interscope; Formats: Digital download, streaming	To be released											
"—" denotes a recording that did not chart or was not released in that territory.

=== Audio books ===
List of audio books, with selected chart positions
Title	Album details	Peak chart positions									
Title	Album details	US Sales	BEL (FL)	BEL (WA)	FRA	POL	POR	SCO	SPA	SWI	UK
Violet Bent Backwards over the Grass	Released: July 28, 2020; Label: Polydor, Interscope; Formats: CD, LP, cassette	19	47	47	57	34	7	11	59	82	25

=== Reissues ===
List of reissues, with selected chart positions and certifications
Title	Album details	Peak chart positions									Certifications
Title	Album details	AUS	BEL (FL)	BEL (WA)	JPN	MEX	NLD	NZ	POL	SWE	Certifications
Born to Die: The Paradise Edition	Released: November 9, 2012; Label: Polydor, Interscope; Formats: CD, LP, digital download	17	6	15	35	22	15	6	4	22	ARIA: Platinum; RMNZ: Platinum

=== Box sets ===
List of box sets
Title	Album details
The Singles (Note: A box set distributed exclusively by Fnac. It consists of four 7" vinyl versions of singles from Born to Die: The Paradise Edition.)	Released: December 10, 2012; Label: Polydor; Format: 7-inch record

== Extended plays ==
List of extended plays, with selected chart positions and certifications
Title	Details	Peak chart positions					Sales	Certifications
Title	Details	US	US Rock	AUS	CAN	NZ	Sales	Certifications
Kill Kill (Note: Del Rey released the EP under her stage name Lizzy Grant.)	Released: October 21, 2008; Label: 5 Points; Format: Digital download	—	—	—	—	—		
Lana Del Rey	Released: January 10, 2012; Label: Polydor, Interscope; Format: Digital download	20	6	—	18	—		
Paradise	Released: November 9, 2012; Label: Polydor, Interscope; Formats: CD, LP, digital download	10	4	19	10	19	US: 332,000 (Note: US sales figures for Paradise as of April 2014)	ARIA: Platinum
Tropico	Released: December 6, 2013; Label: Polydor, Interscope; Format: Digital download	—	—	—	—	—		
"—" denotes a recording that did not chart or was not released in that territory.

== Singles ==
=== As lead artist ===
List of singles, with selected chart positions and certifications
Title	Year	Peak chart positions										Certifications	Album
Title	Year	US	AUS	AUT	CAN	FRA	GER	IRE	NZ	SWI	UK	Certifications	Album
"Video Games"	2011	91	23	2	72	2	1	6	—	2	9	RIAA: 3× Platinum; ARIA: 5× Platinum; BPI: 3× Platinum; BVMI: 2× Platinum; IFPI AUT: 3× Platinum; IFPI SWI: 2× Platinum; MC: Gold; RMNZ: 3× Platinum	Born to Die
"Born to Die"	2011	— (Note: "Born to Die" did not enter the Billboard Hot 100, but peaked at number nine on the Hot Singles Sales chart.)	34	10	—	13	29	12	—	13	9	RIAA: 3× Platinum; ARIA: 2× Platinum; BPI: Platinum; BVMI: Gold; IFPI AUT: Platinum; MC: Gold; RMNZ: 2× Platinum	Born to Die
"Blue Jeans"	2012	—	—	—	— (Note: "Blue Jeans" did not enter the Canadian Hot 100, but peaked at number 70 on the Hot Canadian Digital Singles chart.)	16	—	81	—	39	32	RIAA: 2× Platinum; ARIA: 2× Platinum; BPI: Platinum; MC: Gold; RMNZ: Platinum	Born to Die
"Summertime Sadness" (solo or remix with Cedric Gervais)	2012	6	3	8	7	10	4	7	23	3	4	RIAA: 8× Platinum; ARIA: 12× Platinum; BPI: 5× Platinum; BVMI: 3× Platinum; IFPI AUT: 4× Platinum; IFPI SWI: 5× Platinum; MC: Diamond; RMNZ: 7× Platinum	Born to Die
"National Anthem"	2012	—	—	—	—	152	—	—	—	—	92	RIAA: Platinum; ARIA: Platinum; BPI: Platinum; RMNZ: Gold	Born to Die
"Ride"	2012	—	89	63	—	56	44	35	—	20	32	RIAA: Platinum; ARIA: Platinum; BPI: Gold; RMNZ: Platinum	Paradise
"Dark Paradise"	2013	—	—	42	—	—	45	—	—	48	—	RIAA: Platinum; ARIA: Platinum; BPI: Gold; IFPI AUT: Gold; RMNZ: Platinum	Born to Die
"Young and Beautiful"	2013	22	8	57	45	31	50	16	23	31	23	RIAA: 6× Platinum; ARIA: 10× Platinum; BPI: 2× Platinum; BVMI: Platinum; IFPI AUT: Platinum; MC: Platinum; RMNZ: 4× Platinum	The Great Gatsby (soundtrack)
"Once Upon a Dream"	2014	— (Note: "Once Upon a Dream" did not enter the Billboard Hot 100, but peaked at number five on the Bubbling Under Hot 100 Singles chart.)	96	—	— (Note: "Once Upon a Dream" did not enter the Canadian Hot 100, but peaked at number 74 on the Hot Canadian Digital Singles chart.)	122	—	71	—	—	60	RIAA: Platinum; ARIA: Gold; BPI: Silver	Maleficent (Original Motion Picture Soundtrack)
"West Coast"	2014	17	44	39	26	34	22	31	31	13	21	RIAA: 2× Platinum; ARIA: 2× Platinum; BPI: Platinum; BVMI: Gold; IFPI AUT: Platinum; RMNZ: 2× Platinum	Ultraviolence
"Shades of Cool"	2014	79	50	—	52	37	—	—	—	43	144	RIAA: Gold; ARIA: Gold; BPI: Silver	Ultraviolence
"Ultraviolence"	2014	70	—	—	38	88	—	—	—	—	105	RIAA: Platinum; ARIA: Gold; BPI: Gold; RMNZ: Gold	Ultraviolence
"Brooklyn Baby"	2014	— (Note: "Brooklyn Baby" did not enter the Billboard Hot 100, but peaked at number one on the Bubbling Under Hot 100 Singles chart.)	35	64	60	33	—	—	19	16	86	RIAA: Platinum; ARIA: Platinum; BPI: Platinum; IFPI AUT: Gold; RMNZ: Platinum	Ultraviolence
"High by the Beach"	2015	51	51	56	39	14	75	59	—	58	60	RIAA: Platinum; ARIA: Platinum; BPI: Silver; RMNZ: Gold	Honeymoon
"Music to Watch Boys To"	2015	—	—	—	—	117	—	—	—	—	186		Honeymoon
"Love"	2017	44	41	43	48	84	68	35	— (Note: "Love" did not enter the NZ Top 40 Singles Chart, but peaked at number three on the NZ Heatseeker Singles Chart.)	27	41	RIAA: Platinum; ARIA: Platinum; BPI: Gold; RMNZ: Gold	Lust for Life
"Lust for Life" (featuring the Weeknd)	2017	64	44	51	39	66	65	33	— (Note: "Lust for Life" did not enter the NZ Top 40 Singles Chart, but peaked at number one on the NZ Heatseeker Singles Chart.)	48	38	RIAA: Platinum; ARIA: Platinum; BPI: Gold; RMNZ: Gold	Lust for Life
"Summer Bummer" (featuring ASAP Rocky and Playboi Carti)	2017	— (Note: "Summer Bummer" did not enter the Billboard Hot 100, but peaked at number 23 on the Bubbling Under Hot 100 Singles chart.)	—	—	80	—	—	—	— (Note: "Summer Bummer" did not enter the NZ Top 40 Singles Chart, but peaked at number two on the NZ Heatseeker Singles Chart.)	—	81	RIAA: Gold; ARIA: Gold	Lust for Life
"Groupie Love" (featuring ASAP Rocky)	2017	—	—	—	—	—	—	—	— (Note: "Groupie Love" did not enter the NZ Top 40 Singles Chart, but peaked at number eight on the NZ Heatseeker Singles Chart.)	—	—		Lust for Life
"You Must Love Me" (with Andrew Lloyd Webber)	2018	—	—	—	—	—	—	—	—	—	—		Unmasked: The Platinum Collection
"Mariners Apartment Complex"	2018	— (Note: "Mariners Apartment Complex" did not enter the Billboard Hot 100, but peaked at number 42 on the Digital Song Sales chart.)	93	—	— (Note: "Mariners Apartment Complex" did not enter the Canadian Hot 100, but peaked at number 34 the Hot Canadian Digital Singles chart.)	—	—	74	— (Note: "Mariners Apartment Complex" did not enter the NZ Top 40 Singles Chart, but peaked at number 11 on the NZ Hot Singles Chart.)	89	79	RIAA: Gold; ARIA: Platinum; BPI: Silver; RMNZ: Gold	Norman Fucking Rockwell!
"Venice Bitch"	2018	—	—	—	—	—	—	—	— (Note: "Venice Bitch" did not enter the NZ Top 40 Singles Chart, but peaked at number 32 on the NZ Hot Singles Chart.)	—	— (Note: "Venice Bitch" did not enter the UK Singles Chart, but peaked at number 76 on the UK Download Chart.)	RIAA: Gold; ARIA: Gold; BPI: Silver; RMNZ: Gold	Norman Fucking Rockwell!
"Hope Is a Dangerous Thing for a Woman Like Me to Have – but I Have It"	2019	—	—	—	— (Note: "Hope Is a Dangerous Thing for a Woman Like Me to Have – but I Have It" did not enter the Canadian Hot 100, but peaked at number 45 the Hot Canadian Digital Singles chart.)	—	—	80	— (Note: "Hope Is a Dangerous Thing for a Woman Like Me to Have – but I Have It" did not enter the NZ Top 40 Singles Chart, but peaked at number 11 on the NZ Hot Singles Chart.)	—	99	ARIA: Gold	Norman Fucking Rockwell!
"Doin' Time"	2019	59	— (Note: "Doin' Time" did not enter the ARIA Singles Chart, but peaked at number 39 on the ARIA Digital Track Chart.)	—	60	162	—	51	— (Note: "Doin' Time" did not enter the NZ Top 40 Singles Chart, but peaked at number 13 on the NZ Hot Singles Chart.)	70	42	RIAA: Platinum; ARIA: Platinum; BPI: Platinum; MC: Gold; RMNZ: Platinum	Norman Fucking Rockwell!
"The Greatest"	2019	—	—	—	—	—	—	—	— (Note: "The Greatest" did not enter the NZ Top 40 Singles Chart, but peaked at number 22 on the NZ Hot Singles Chart.)	—	—		Norman Fucking Rockwell!
"Don't Call Me Angel" (with Ariana Grande and Miley Cyrus)	2019	13	4	12	7	64	11	2	6	4	2	ARIA: Platinum; BPI: Gold; MC: Gold; RMNZ: Gold	Charlie's Angels (soundtrack)
"Let Me Love You like a Woman"	2020	— (Note: "Let Me Love You Like a Woman" did not enter the Billboard Hot 100, but peaked at number 24 on the Digital Song Sales chart.)	—	—	— (Note: "Let Me Love You Like a Woman" did not enter the Canadian Hot 100, but peaked at number 45 on the Hot Canadian Digital Singles chart.)	—	—	60	— (Note: "Let Me Love You Like a Woman" did not enter the NZ Top 40 Singles Chart, but peaked at number nine on the NZ Hot Singles Chart.)	85	87		Chemtrails over the Country Club
"Chemtrails over the Country Club"	2021	—	—	—	—	—	—	44	— (Note: "Chemtrails over the Country Club" did not enter the NZ Top 40 Singles Chart, but peaked at number 17 on the NZ Hot Singles Chart.)	94	58	ARIA: Gold; BPI: Gold; IFPI AUT: Gold; RMNZ: Platinum; SNEP: Gold	Chemtrails over the Country Club
"White Dress"	2021	—	—	—	—	—	—	43	— (Note: "White Dress" did not enter the NZ Top 40 Singles Chart, but peaked at number 12 on the NZ Hot Singles Chart.)	—	51		Chemtrails over the Country Club
"Tulsa Jesus Freak"	2021	—	—	—	—	—	—	57	— (Note: "Tulsa Jesus Freak" did not enter the NZ Top 40 Singles Chart, but peaked at number 13 on the NZ Hot Singles Chart.)	—	81		Chemtrails over the Country Club
"Blue Banisters"	2021	—	—	—	—	—	—	—	— (Note: "Blue Banisters" did not enter the NZ Top 40 Singles Chart, but peaked at number 31 on the NZ Hot Singles Chart.)	—	—		Blue Banisters
"Arcadia"	2021	—	—	—	—	—	—	—	— (Note: "Arcadia" did not enter the NZ Top 40 Singles Chart, but peaked at number 21 on the NZ Hot Singles Chart.)	—	—		Blue Banisters
"Watercolor Eyes"	2022	— (Note: "Watercolor Eyes" did not enter the Billboard Hot 100, but peaked at number 18 on the Bubbling Under Hot 100 Singles chart.)	—	—	98	—	—	—	— (Note: "Watercolor Eyes" did not enter the NZ Top 40 Singles Chart, but peaked at number seven on the NZ Hot Singles Chart.)	—	87		Euphoria Season 2 (An HBO Original Series Soundtrack)
"Did You Know That There's a Tunnel Under Ocean Blvd"	2022	—	—	—	—	—	—	87	— (Note: "Did You Know That There's a Tunnel Under Ocean Blvd" did not enter the NZ Top 40 Singles Chart, but peaked at number 19 on the NZ Hot Singles Chart.)	—	98		Did You Know That There's a Tunnel Under Ocean Blvd
"A&W"	2023	— (Note: "A&W" did not enter the Billboard Hot 100, but peaked at number five on the Bubbling Under Hot 100 Singles chart.)	—	—	84	—	—	37	— (Note: "A&W" did not enter the NZ Top 40 Singles Chart, but peaked at number 16 on the NZ Hot Singles Chart.)	—	41		Did You Know That There's a Tunnel Under Ocean Blvd
"The Grants"	2023	—	—	—	—	—	—	—	— (Note: "The Grants" did not enter the NZ Top 40 Singles Chart, but peaked at number 35 on the NZ Hot Singles Chart.)	—	—		Did You Know That There's a Tunnel Under Ocean Blvd
"Say Yes to Heaven"	2023	54	20	36	34	90	41	8	10	18	9	RIAA: Gold; ARIA: 2× Platinum; BPI: Platinum; BVMI: Gold; IFPI AUT: Platinum; RMNZ: Platinum; SNEP: Platinum	Non-album single
"Candy Necklace" (featuring Jon Batiste)	2023	—	—	—	—	—	—	75	— (Note: "Candy Necklace" did not enter the NZ Top 40 Singles Chart, but peaked at number eight on the NZ Hot Singles Chart.)	—	68		Did You Know That There's a Tunnel Under Ocean Blvd
"Tough" (with Quavo)	2024	33	40	32	28	81	38	24	23	18	32	RMNZ: Gold	Non-album single
"Henry, Come On"	2025	90	—	—	66	—	—	39	— (Note: "Henry, Come On" did not enter the NZ Top 40 Singles Chart, but peaked at number one on the NZ Hot Singles Chart.)	60	30		Stove
"Bluebird"	2025	—	—	—	—	—	—	86	— (Note: "Bluebird" did not enter the NZ Top 40 Singles Chart, but peaked at number three on the NZ Hot Singles Chart.)	—	80		Stove
"White Feather Hawk Tail Deer Hunter"	2026	— (Note: "White Feather Hawk Tail Deer Hunter" did not enter the Billboard Hot 100, but peaked at number six on the Bubbling Under Hot 100 Singles chart.)	—	—	84	—	—	66	— (Note: "White Feather Hawk Tail Deer Hunter" did not enter the NZ Top 40 Singles Chart, but peaked at number 12 on the NZ Hot Singles Chart.)	—	58		Stove
"First Light"	2026	—	—	—	—	—	—	—	— (Note: "First Light" did not enter the NZ Top 40 Singles Chart, but peaked at number 6 on the NZ Hot Singles Chart.)	—	70		Non-album single
"—" denotes a recording that did not chart or was not released in that territory.

=== As featured artist ===
Title	Year	Peak chart positions										Certifications	Album
Title	Year	US	AUT	CAN	FRA	GER	IRE	NZ	SWE	SWI	UK	Certifications	Album
"Wait for Life" (Emile Haynie featuring Lana Del Rey)	2015	—	—	—	—	—	—	—	—	—	—		We Fall
"Woman" (Cat Power featuring Lana Del Rey)	2018	—	—	—	—	—	—	—	—	—	—		Wanderer
"God Save Our Young Blood" (Børns featuring Lana Del Rey)	2018	—	—	—	—	—	—	—	—	—	—		Blue Madonna
"Hallucinogenics" (Matt Maeson featuring Lana Del Rey)	2020	—	—	80	—	—	—	— (Note: "Hallucinogenics" did not enter the NZ Top 40 Singles Chart, but peaked at number 26 on the NZ Hot Singles Chart.)	—	—	—		Bank on the Funeral
"Secret Life" (Bleachers featuring Lana Del Rey)	2021	—	—	—	—	—	—	—	—	—	—		Take the Sadness Out of Saturday Night
"Snow on the Beach" (Taylor Swift featuring Lana Del Rey)	2022	4	12	3	69	74	3	4	16	16	4	ARIA: 2× Platinum; BPI: Platinum; MC: Gold; RMNZ: Platinum; SNEP: Gold	Midnights
"Lost at Sea" (Rob Grant featuring Lana Del Rey)	2023	—	—	—	—	—	—	—	—	—	—		Lost at Sea
"Hollywood Bowl" (Rob Grant featuring Lana Del Rey)	2023	—	—	—	—	—	—	—	—	—	—		Lost at Sea
"Life Lesson" (Jon Batiste featuring Lana Del Rey)	2023	—	—	—	—	—	—	—	—	—	—		World Music Radio
"Summertime" (Kontra K featuring Lana Del Rey)	2023	—	6	—	—	1	—	—	—	24	—	BVMI: Gold	Die Hoffnung klaut mir niemand
"Suburban House" (Holly Macve featuring Lana Del Rey)	2023	—	—	—	—	—	—	— (Note: "Suburban House" did not enter the NZ Top 40 Singles Chart, but peaked at number 32 on the NZ Hot Singles Chart.)	—	—	—		Time Is Forever
"Lies" (Zach Bryan featuring Lana Del Rey)	2026	4	—	4	—	—	3	17	6	60	7		Young Manhood and Other Donatable Organs
"—" denotes a recording that did not chart or was not released in that territory.

=== Promotional singles ===
List of promotional singles, with selected chart positions and certifications
Title	Year	Peak chart positions									Certifications	Album
Title	Year	US	US Rock	CAN	FRA	IRE	NZ	SCO	SWE	UK	Certifications	Album
"Off to the Races"	2011	—	40	—	—	—	—	—	—	—	RIAA: Platinum; ARIA: Gold; BPI: Silver; RMNZ: Gold	Born to Die
"Carmen"	2012	—	—	—	—	—	—	—	—	—	RIAA: Gold; BPI: Silver	Born to Die
"Blue Velvet"	2012	—	—	—	40	—	—	—	—	60		Paradise
"Burning Desire" (Note: "Burning Desire" is included on the iTunes edition of Paradise.)	2013	—	—	—	—	—	—	—	—	172		Paradise
"Black Beauty" (Note: "Black Beauty" is included on the deluxe edition of Ultraviolence.)	2014	—	—	—	—	—	—	—	—	179		Ultraviolence
"Terrence Loves You"	2015	—	— (Note: "Terrence Loves You" did not enter the Hot Rock & Alternative Songs chart, but peaked at number eight on the Alternative Digital Song Sales chart.)	—	128	—	—	—	—	188		Honeymoon
"Honeymoon"	2015	—	— (Note: "Honeymoon" did not enter the Hot Rock & Alternative Songs chart, but peaked at number 21 on the Alternative Digital Songs Sale chart.)	—	154	—	—	84	—	—		Honeymoon
"Coachella – Woodstock in My Mind"	2017	—	— (Note: "Coachella – Woodstock in My Mind" did not enter the Hot Rock & Alternative Songs chart, but peaked at number 14 on the Rock Digital Song Sales chart.)	—	82	—	—	—	—	—		Lust for Life
"Season of the Witch"	2019	— (Note: "Season of the Witch" did not enter the Billboard Hot 100, but peaked at number 36 on the Digital Songs Sales chart.)	23	—	—	—	—	81	—	—		Scary Stories to Tell in the Dark (soundtrack)
"Looking for America"	2019	—	— (Note: "Looking for America" did not enter the Hot Rock & Alternative Songs chart, but peaked at number six on the Alternative Digital Songs Sale chart.)	—	—	—	—	52	—	— (Note: "Looking for America" did not enter the UK Singles Chart, but peaked at 62 on the UK Download chart.)		Non-album single
"Fuck It I Love You"	2019	— (Note: "Fuck It I Love You" did not enter the Billboard Hot 100, but peaked at number 19 on the Bubbling Under Hot 100 Singles chart.)	— (Note: "Fuck It I Love You" did not enter the Hot Rock & Alternative Songs chart, but peaked at number four on the Alternative Digital Songs Sale chart.)	— (Note: "Fuck It I Love You" did not enter the Canadian Hot 100, but peaked at number 44 on the Hot Canadian Digital Singles chart.)	179	59	— (Note: "Fuck It I Love You" did not enter the NZ Top 40 Singles Chart, but peaked at number 17 on the NZ Heatseekers Chart.)	—	— (Note: "Fuck It I Love You" did not enter the Swedish Sverigetopplistan Singles Chart, but peaked at number nine on the Swedish Heatseekers Chart.)	59	RIAA: Gold; ARIA: Gold; BPI: Silver; RMNZ: Gold	Norman Fucking Rockwell!
"LA Who Am I to Love You"	2020	—	—	—	—	—	—	—	—	—		Violet Bent Backwards over the Grass
"Summertime The Gershwin Version"	2020	—	—	—	—	—	—	—	—	—		Non-album single
"You'll Never Walk Alone" (Note: Del Rey recorded a cover of "You'll Never Walk Alone" for Liverpool F.C.'s documentary The End of the Storm. The cover was released as a limited-edition 7-inch single.)	2020	—	—	—	—	—	—	—	—	—		The End of the Storm (Official Soundtrack)
"Wildflower Wildfire"	2021	—	—	—	—	—	—	—	—	—		Blue Banisters
"Text Book"	2021	—	44	—	—	—	—	—	—	—		Blue Banisters
"Take Me Home, Country Roads"	2023	—	—	—	—	96	— (Note: "Take Me Home, Country Roads" did not enter the NZ Top 40 Singles Chart, but peaked at number five on the NZ Hot Singles Chart.)	—	—	—		Non-album single
"—" denotes a recording that did not chart or was not released in that territory.

== Other charted and certified songs ==
List of songs, with selected chart positions and certifications
Title	Year	Peak chart positions									Certifications	Album
Title	Year	US	US Rock	US R&B	CAN	FRA	IRE	NZ	SWE	UK	Certifications	Album
"Radio"	2012	—	14	—	83	67	61	—	—	78	RIAA: Platinum; ARIA: 3× Platinum; BPI: Gold; MC: 2× Platinum; RMNZ: Platinum	Born to Die
"Without You"	2012	—	—	—	—	—	—	—	—	121	RIAA: Gold	Born to Die
"Diet Mountain Dew"	2012	—	—	—	—	—	—	—	—	—	RIAA: Platinum; ARIA: Platinum; BPI: Gold; RMNZ: Platinum	Born to Die
"Million Dollar Man"	2012	—	—	—	—	—	—	—	—	—	RIAA: Gold; BPI: Silver	Born to Die
"This Is What Makes Us Girls"	2012	—	—	—	—	—	—	—	—	—	RIAA: Gold; ARIA: Gold	Born to Die
"Dayglo Reflection" (Bobby Womack featuring Lana Del Rey)	2012	—	—	—	—	138	—	—	—	—		The Bravest Man in the Universe
"Body Electric"	2012	—	32	—	—	103	—	—	—	160		Paradise
"Bel Air"	2012	—	50	—	—	105	—	—	—	184		Paradise
"Gods & Monsters"	2012	—	15	—	—	92	—	—	—	39	RIAA: Gold; BPI: Silver	Paradise
"Cola"	2012	—	22	—	—	71	99	—	—	120	RIAA: Gold; ARIA: Gold; BPI: Silver	Paradise
"American"	2012	—	29	—	—	84	—	—	—	151	RIAA: Gold	Paradise
"Yayo"	2012	—	—	—	—	120	—	—	—	—		Paradise
"Cruel World"	2014	—	—	—	—	—	—	—	—	— (Note: "Cruel World" did not enter the UK Singles Chart, but peaked at number 64 on the UK Streaming Chart.)		Ultraviolence
"Old Money"	2014	—	—	—	—	190	—	—	—	—		Ultraviolence
"Is This Happiness"	2014	—	—	—	—	164	—	—	—	161		Ultraviolence
"Florida Kilos"	2014	—	—	—	—	—	—	—	—	195		Ultraviolence
"Pretty When You Cry"	2014	—	—	—	—	—	—	—	—	—	ARIA: Gold; BPI: Silver; RMNZ: Gold	Ultraviolence
"Sad Girl"	2014	—	—	—	—	—	—	—	—	—	ARIA: Gold; BPI: Silver; RMNZ: Gold	Ultraviolence
"The Other Woman"	2014	—	—	—	—	—	—	—	—	—	BPI: Silver	Ultraviolence
"Prisoner" (The Weeknd featuring Lana Del Rey)	2015	47	—	16	51	113	—	—	95	78	RIAA: Platinum; ARIA: Gold; MC: Gold	Beauty Behind the Madness
"Freak"	2015	—	— (Note: "Freak" did not enter the Hot Rock & Alternative Songs chart, but peaked at number 17 on the Alternative Digital Song Sales chart.)	—	—	—	—	—	—	—	RIAA: Gold	Honeymoon
"Art Deco"	2015	—	—	—	—	—	—	—	—	—	RIAA: Gold; ARIA: Gold; BPI: Silver; RMNZ: Gold	Honeymoon
"Salvatore"	2015	—	—	—	—	—	—	—	—	—	BPI: Silver; RMNZ: Gold	Honeymoon
"Stargirl Interlude" (The Weeknd featuring Lana Del Rey)	2016	61	—	21	51	—	—	—	—	51	BPI: Platinum; MC: Gold; RMNZ: 2× Platinum; SNEP: Platinum	Starboy
"13 Beaches"	2017	—	27	—	—	195	—	—	89	—		Lust for Life
"Cherry"	2017	—	—	—	—	—	—	— (Note: "Cherry" did not enter the NZ Top 40 Singles Chart, but peaked at number four on the NZ Hot Singles Chart.)	— (Note: "Cherry" did not enter the Sverigetopplistan Top 100 Singles chart, but peaked at number nine on the Sverigetopplistan Heatseekers chart.)	—	RIAA: Gold; ARIA: Gold; BPI: Silver; RMNZ: Gold	Lust for Life
"Beautiful People Beautiful Problems" (featuring Stevie Nicks)	2017	—	29	—	—	—	—	— (Note: "Beautiful People Beautiful Problems" did not enter the NZ Top 40 Singles Chart, but peaked at number five on the NZ Hot Singles Chart.)	—	—		Lust for Life
"Tomorrow Never Came" (featuring Sean Ono Lennon)	2017	—	40	—	—	—	—	—	—	—		Lust for Life
"Get Free"	2017	—	20	—	—	—	—	—	—	—	MC: Gold	Lust for Life
"White Mustang"	2017	—	—	—	—	—	—	—	—	—	BPI: Silver; RMNZ: Gold	Lust for Life
"Norman Fucking Rockwell"	2019	— (Note: "Norman Fucking Rockwell" did not enter the Billboard Hot 100, but peaked at number 12 on the Bubbling Under Hot 100 chart.)	—	—	—	—	—	— (Note: "Norman Fucking Rockwell" did not enter the NZ Top 40 Singles Chart, but peaked at number eight on the NZ Hot Singles Chart.)	—	44	ARIA: Gold; BPI: Gold; RMNZ: Gold	Norman Fucking Rockwell!
"Love Song"	2019	—	—	—	—	—	—	— (Note: "Love Song" did not enter the NZ Top 40 Singles Chart, but peaked at number 16 on the NZ Hot Singles Chart.)	—	—		Norman Fucking Rockwell!
"Cinnamon Girl"	2019	—	— (Note: "Cinnamon Girl" did not enter the Hot Rock & Alternative Songs chart, but peaked at number 18 on the Alternative Digital Song Sales chart.)	—	—	—	—	— (Note: "Cinnamon Girl" did not enter the NZ Top 40 Singles Chart, but peaked at number 14 on the NZ Hot Singles Chart.)	—	—	RIAA: Gold; ARIA: Platinum; BPI: Platinum; RMNZ: Platinum	Norman Fucking Rockwell!
"How to Disappear"	2019	—	—	—	—	—	—	—	—	—	RIAA: Gold; BPI: Silver; RMNZ: Gold	Norman Fucking Rockwell!
"Happiness Is a Butterfly"	2019	—	—	—	—	—	—	—	—	—	RIAA: Gold; ARIA: Gold; BPI: Silver; RMNZ: Gold	Norman Fucking Rockwell!
"Dark but Just a Game"	2021	—	—	—	—	—	—	— (Note: "Dark but Just a Game" did not enter the NZ Top 40 Singles Chart, but peaked at number 20 on the NZ Hot Singles Chart.)	—	—		Chemtrails over the Country Club
"Black Bathing Suit"	2021	—	40	—	—	—	—	— (Note: "Black Bathing Suit" did not enter the NZ Top 40 Singles Chart, but peaked at number 22 on the NZ Hot Singles Chart.)	—	—		Blue Banisters
"If You Lie Down with Me"	2021	—	29	—	—	—	—	— (Note: "If You Lie Down with Me" did not enter the NZ Top 40 Singles Chart, but peaked at number six on the NZ Hot Singles Chart.)	—	—		Blue Banisters
"Dealer"	2021	—	19	—	—	—	75	—	—	87	RIAA: Gold; BPI: Silver; RMNZ: Gold	Blue Banisters
"Sweet"	2023	—	33	—	—	—	—	—	—	—		Did You Know That There's a Tunnel Under Ocean Blvd
"Kintsugi"	2023	—	44	—	—	—	—	—	—	—		Did You Know That There's a Tunnel Under Ocean Blvd
"Fingertips"	2023	—	48	—	—	—	—	—	—	—		Did You Know That There's a Tunnel Under Ocean Blvd
"Paris, Texas" (featuring SYML)	2023	—	24	—	—	—	42	— (Note: "Paris, Texas" did not enter the NZ Top 40 Singles Chart, but peaked at number six on the NZ Hot Singles Chart.)	—	48		Did You Know That There's a Tunnel Under Ocean Blvd
"Grandfather Please Stand on the Shoulders of My Father While He's Deep-Sea Fishing" (featuring Riopy)	2023	—	42	—	—	—	—	—	—	—		Did You Know That There's a Tunnel Under Ocean Blvd
"Let the Light In" (featuring Father John Misty)	2023	—	23	—	—	—	—	— (Note: "Let the Light In" did not enter the NZ Top 40 Singles Chart, but peaked at number 14 on the NZ Hot Singles Chart.)	—	—	BPI: Gold; MC: Gold; RMNZ: Platinum	Did You Know That There's a Tunnel Under Ocean Blvd
"Margaret" (featuring Bleachers)	2023	—	34	—	—	—	—	—	—	—	BPI: Silver; RMNZ: Gold	Did You Know That There's a Tunnel Under Ocean Blvd
"Fishtail"	2023	—	38	—	—	—	—	—	—	—		Did You Know That There's a Tunnel Under Ocean Blvd
"Peppers" (featuring Tommy Genesis)	2023	—	26	—	—	—	—	— (Note: "Peppers" did not enter the NZ Top 40 Singles Chart, but peaked at number 10 on the NZ Hot Singles Chart.)	—	—		Did You Know That There's a Tunnel Under Ocean Blvd
"Taco Truck x VB"	2023	—	29	—	—	—	—	—	—	—		Did You Know That There's a Tunnel Under Ocean Blvd
"The Abyss" (with the Weeknd)	2025	68	—	—	50	60	—	—	—	—		Hurry Up Tomorrow
"—" denotes a recording that did not chart or was not released in that territory.
