= Lana Del Rey's 2023 tour =

2023 concert tour by Lana Del Rey

- Tour by Lana Del Rey
- Promotional poster for the US leg of tour
- Location: Europe; North America; South America
- Associated album: Did You Know That There's a Tunnel Under Ocean Blvd
- Start date: May 27, 2023
- End date: October 5, 2023
- No. of shows: 27

Lana Del Rey concert chronology
- The Norman Fucking Rockwell! Tour (2019); 2023 Tour (2023); UK and Ireland Tour (2025)

Lana Del Rey's 2023 tour (also known as the Did You Know That There's a Tunnel Under Ocean Blvd Tour) was the sixth headlining concert tour by American singer-songwriter Lana Del Rey, in support of her ninth studio album Did You Know That There’s a Tunnel Under Ocean Blvd (2023). The tour commenced on May 27, 2023, in Rio de Janeiro, and concluded on October 5, 2023 in Charleston, West Virginia. The tour consisted of 27 dates.

== Background ==
In 2019, Del Rey embarked on the Norman Fucking Rockwell! Tour. Its final eight shows, which were set to take place across Europe, were abruptly cancelled due to illness. Due to the COVID-19 pandemic, the final leg of the Norman Fucking Rockwell! Tour was cancelled. In 2021, Del Rey released the albums Chemtrails over the Country Club and Blue Banisters.

In 2023, Del Rey released her ninth album, Did You Know That There's a Tunnel Under Ocean Blvd: immediately preceding its release, Del Rey was announced as the headliner for the MITA Music Festival in Rio de Janeiro and São Paulo, her first concert since 2019. Throughout 2023, Del Rey revealed dates for further shows throughout North America and Europe, including headlining shows at the Glastonbury, Lollapalooza, and All Things Go festivals. On August 21, Del Rey announced 10 additional shows in the United States for September and October. Within days, the shows had completely sold out.

== Set list ==
This set list was taken from the show in Camaiore, Italy, on July 2, 2023. It does not represent all shows throughout the tour.

1. "A&W"
2. "Young and Beautiful"
3. "Bartender"
4. "Chemtrails over the Country Club"
5. "The Grants"
6. "Cherry"
7. "Pretty When You Cry"
8. "Ride"
9. "Born to Die"
10. "Blue Jeans"
11. "Norman Fucking Rockwell"
12. "Arcadia"
13. "Ultraviolence"
14. "White Mustang"
15. "Candy Necklace"
16. "Venice Bitch"
17. "Diet Mountain Dew"
18. "Summertime Sadness"
19. "Did You Know That There's a Tunnel Under Ocean Blvd"
20. "Video Games"

== Tour dates ==
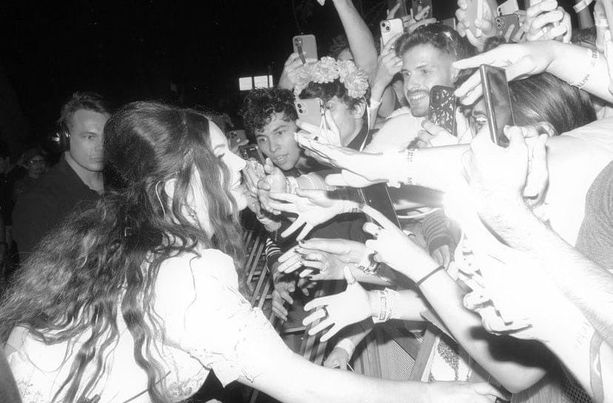
Del Rey with fans in São Paulo

List of concerts
Date (2023)	City	Country	Venue	Opening act
May 27 (Note: This show was part of MITA Festival.)	Rio de Janeiro	Brazil	Hipódromo da Gávea	—N/a
June 3	São Paulo	Brazil	Vale do Anhangabaú	—N/a
June 24 (Note: This show was part of Glastonbury Festival.)	Pilton	England	Worthy Farm	—N/a
July 2 (Note: This show was part of La Prima Estate Festival.)	Camaiore	Italy	Parco BussolaDomani	—N/a
July 4	Amsterdam	Netherlands	Ziggo Dome	Naaz
July 7	Dublin	Ireland	3Arena	Shiv
July 9 (Note: This show was part of British Summer Time.)	London	England	Hyde Park	—N/a
July 10	Paris	France	Olympia	—N/a
July 15 (Note: This show was part of Festival d'été de Québec.)	Quebec City	Canada	Plains of Abraham	—N/a
July 30 (Note: This show was part of Newport Folk Festival.)	Newport	United States	Fort Adams State Park	—N/a
August 6 (Note: This show was part of Lollapalooza.)	Chicago	United States	Grant Park	—N/a
August 8	Rogers	United States	Walmart Arkansas Music Pavilion	Arkansauce
August 12 (Note: This show was part of Outside Lands.)	San Francisco	United States	Golden Gate Park	—N/a
August 15	Mexico City	Mexico	Foro Sol	Shiadanni
August 16	Mexico City	Mexico	Foro Sol	Shiadanni
September 14	Franklin	United States	FirstBank Amphitheater	Nikki Lane
September 15	Franklin	United States	FirstBank Amphitheater	Nikki Lane
September 17	Austin	United States	Germania Insurance Amphitheater	Nikki Lane
September 19	Dallas	United States	Dos Equis Pavilion	Nikki Lane
September 21	Huntsville	United States	The Orion Amphitheater	Zella Day
September 23	West Palm Beach	United States	iTHINK Financial Amphitheatre	Zella Day
September 25	East Lake-Orient Park (Note: Labelled as Tampa in promotional material.)	United States	MidFlorida Credit Union Amphitheatre	Nikki Lane
September 27	Brandon	United States	Brandon Amphitheater	Nikki Lane
September 29	Charlotte	United States	PNC Music Pavilion	Nikki Lane
October 1 (Note: This show was part of All Things Go.)	Columbia	United States	Merriweather Post Pavilion	—N/a
October 3	Burgettstown (Note: Labelled as Pittsburgh in promotional material.)	United States	The Pavilion at Star Lake	Nikki Lane
October 5	Charleston	United States	Charleston Coliseum	Zella Day

=== Cancelled shows ===
Date (2023)	City	Country	Venue	Reason
August 18	Monterrey	Mexico	Estadio Borregos	Logistical problems. A ticket presale by Live Nation and Citibanamex was canceled hours before taking place.
August 20	Guadalajara	Mexico	Estadio 3 de Marzo	Logistical problems. A ticket presale by Live Nation and Citibanamex was canceled hours before taking place.
