= Tough (Quavo and Lana Del Rey song) =

Single by Quavo and Lana Del Rey
- Released: July 3, 2024
- Genre: Alt-pop; country trap
- Length: 3:08
- Label: Quality Control; Motown
- Composers: Andrew Watt; Benny Negrin; Elysse Yulo; Jack Antonoff; Cirkut; Jaxson Free; Josh Dorr; Maddox Batson; Nick Bailey
- Lyricists: Lana Del Rey; Quavo
- Producers: Andrew Watt; Cirkut

Quavo singles chronology
"Mink" (2024)	"Tough" (2024)

Lana Del Rey singles chronology
"Candy Necklace" (2023)	"Tough" (2024)	"Henry, Come On" (2025)

Music video
- "Tough" on YouTube

"Tough" is a song by American rapper Quavo and American singer-songwriter Lana Del Rey. It was released on July 3, 2024, through Quality Control Music and Motown Records.

== Background and release ==
On May 9, 2024, a snippet of the song was shared on Instagram, with a second snippet of the song being shared on June 19. The following day, Del Rey performed at Fenway Park as part of her Festival Tour, where she brought out Quavo as a special guest and performed the song. After the song's release, a snippet of Del Rey and Quavo recording the song was shared by the latter on Instagram.

== Critical reception ==
Ashley Iasimone of Billboard said of the song; "A little bit country, a little bit trap and alt-pop, the Andrew Watt- and Cirkut-produced track has a dreamy hook that's tough to quit humming when the song's over". Clash described the song as a "country-trap masterclass", while giving it an 8/10.

== Commercial performance ==
In the United States, "Tough" debuted at number thirty-three on the Billboard Hot 100 for the week dated July 20, 2024, becoming Quavo's eighth top-forty song on the chart, and Del Rey's sixth. On the Billboard Global 200, "Tough" debuted at number twenty-one, becoming Del Rey's highest entry on the chart since "Say Yes to Heaven" (2023) peaked in number eighteen in March 2023, and tenth overall, and Quavo's fourth entry.

In the United Kingdom, "Tough" debuted at number thirty-two on the UK Singles Chart, spending three weeks in the top-fifty, and charted for a total of six weeks before departing. It also reached number one on the UK Physical Singles Chart and number two on the UK Singles Sales Chart, following its release on vinyl, for the week dated September 19, 2024. Elsewhere, the song reached the top-twenty in Switzerland, Greece and Latvia, while reaching the top-forty in Australia, Austria, Canada, Germany, Ireland, Luxembourg, New Zealand, Norway, Portugal and Suriname.

== Music video ==
The official music video for "Tough" was directed by Wyatt Spain Winfrey, Quavo, and Del Rey. It premiered via Quavo's Vevo channel on YouTube on July 3, 2024. It contains clips of the two singing with each other in open fields, in front of cars. The video ends with Del Rey in the passenger seat smiling at Quavo who is driving a truck.

== Charts ==
=== Weekly charts ===
Weekly chart performance for "Tough"
Chart (2024)	Peak position
Australia (ARIA)	40
Austria (Ö3 Austria Top 40)	32
Canada Hot 100 (Billboard)	28
Czech Republic Singles Digital (ČNS IFPI)	30
France (SNEP)	81
Germany (GfK)	38
Global 200 (Billboard)	21
Greece International (IFPI)	7
Ireland (IRMA)	24
Latvia (LAIPA)	12
Lebanon English Airplay (Lebanese Top 20)	11
Luxembourg (Billboard)	22
Netherlands (Single Top 100)	83
New Zealand (Recorded Music NZ)	23
Norway (VG-lista)	39
Poland (Polish Streaming Top 100)	43
Portugal (AFP)	21
Slovakia Singles Digital (ČNS IFPI)	22
South Korea BGM (Circle)	106
Suriname (Nationale Top 40)	21
Sweden (Sverigetopplistan)	54
Switzerland (Schweizer Hitparade)	18
UK Singles (Official Charts)	32
UK Hip Hop/R&B (Official Charts)	8
US Billboard Hot 100	33

=== Monthly charts ===
Monthly chart performance for "Tough"
Chart (2024)	Peak position
Czech Republic (Singles Digitál – Top 100)	85
Slovakia (Singles Digitál – Top 100)	60

== Certifications ==
Region	Certification	Certified units/sales
Brazil (Pro-Música Brasil)	2× Platinum	80,000^{‡}
New Zealand (RMNZ)	Gold	15,000^{‡}
^{‡} Sales+streaming figures based on certification alone.

== Release history ==
Release dates and formats for "Tough"
Region	Date	Format	Label	Ref.
Various	July 3, 2024	Digital download; streaming	Quality Control; Motown	
Various	September 6, 2024	7-inch single	Interscope	
