= Snow on the Beach =

2022 single by Taylor Swift featuring Lana Del Rey

Single by Taylor Swift featuring Lana Del Rey

from the album Midnights
- Released: November 7, 2022
- Studio: Rough Customer, New York City; Electric Lady, New York City; Henson, Hollywood
- Genre: Dream pop; bedroom pop
- Length: 4:16
- Label: Republic
- Songwriters: Taylor Swift; Lana Del Rey; Jack Antonoff
- Producers: Taylor Swift; Jack Antonoff

Taylor Swift singles chronology
"Anti-Hero" (2022)	"Snow on the Beach" (2022)	"Lavender Haze" (2022)

Lana Del Rey singles chronology
"Watercolor Eyes" (2022)	"Snow on the Beach" (2022)	"Did You Know That There's a Tunnel Under Ocean Blvd" (2022)

Lyric video
- "Snow on the Beach" on YouTube

"Snow on the Beach" is a song by the American singer-songwriter Taylor Swift from her tenth studio album, Midnights (2022). She wrote the track with the featured artist Lana Del Rey and Jack Antonoff, who produced it with her. A midtempo dream pop and bedroom pop tune, "Snow on the Beach" is a love song about two people falling in love with each other simultaneously. The production contains synthesizers, plucked violin, and a reverbed bass, and Del Rey contributes with backing vocals. It was issued to US triple-A radio as the second single from the album on November 7, 2022.

The song was met with mixed reviews; some critics praised it for what they deemed a wintry production and engaging lyrics, but others found Del Rey's contribution underwhelming. This response influenced Swift to release a "More Lana Del Rey" version, as part of The Til Dawn Edition of Midnights on May 26, 2023. "Snow on the Beach" peaked at number three on the Billboard Global 200 and number four on the US Billboard Hot 100, where it marked Del Rey's highest-peaking song. It also reached the top 10 and received certifications in Australia, Canada, New Zealand, Portugal, and the United Kingdom.

== Background and production ==
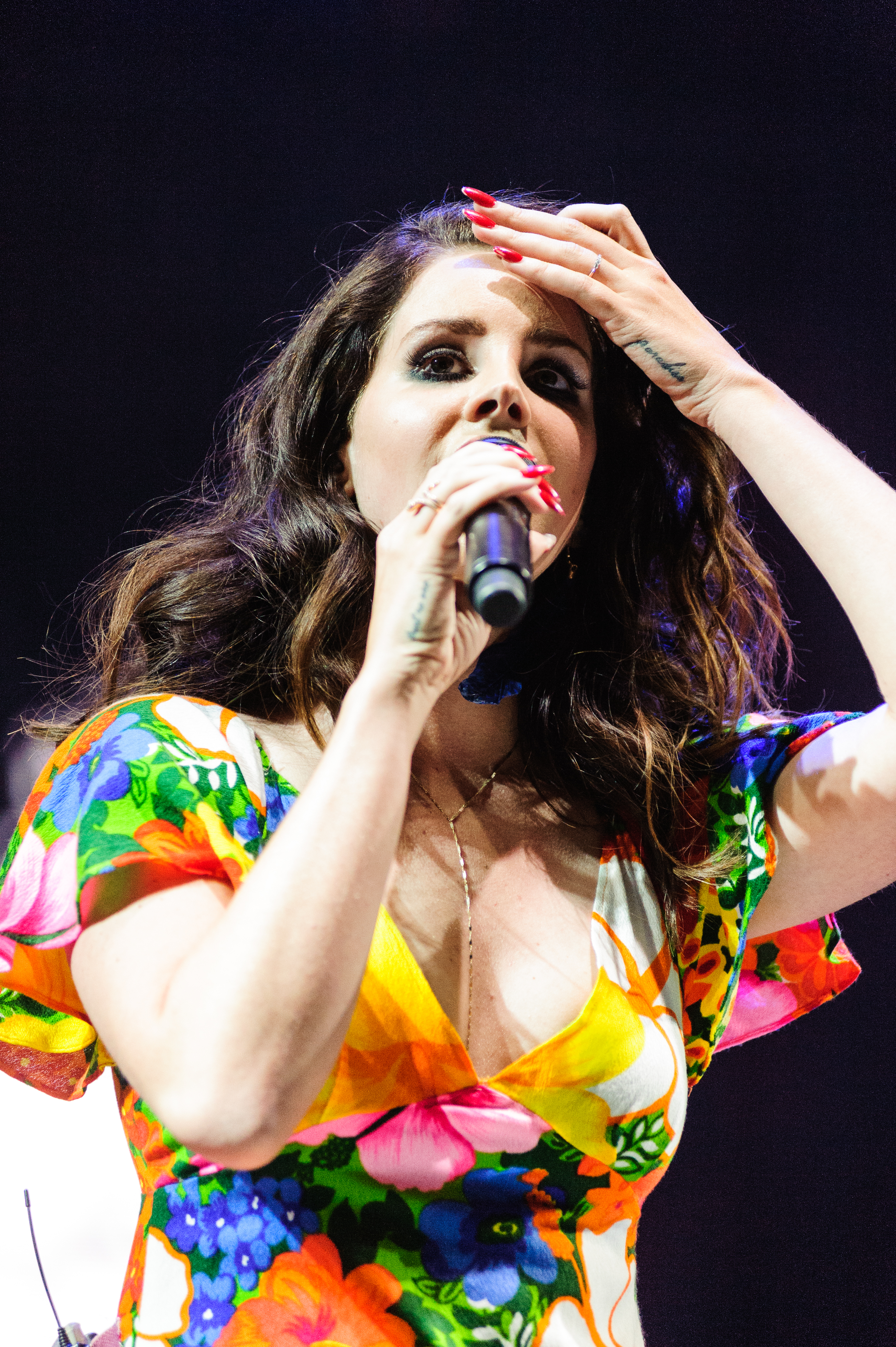
Lana Del Rey (pictured in 2014) features on the track.

On August 28, 2022, the American singer-songwriter Taylor Swift announced her tenth studio album at the 2022 MTV Video Music Awards; she soon revealed the album's title, Midnights, and its cover on social networks but the track-list was not revealed. Swift's longtime collaborator Jack Antonoff, who had worked with her since her fifth studio album 1989 (2014), was confirmed as a producer on the album by a video posted to her Instagram account on September 16, titled "The making of Midnights".

On September 21, Swift began unveiling the album's track-list in a randomized order through a short 13-episode video series on TikTok, titled Midnights Mayhem with Me. In each episode, Swift rolls a lottery cage containing 13 ping pong balls numbered from one to thirteen, each representing a track of Midnights, and when a ball drops out, she announces the title of the corresponding track on the album through a telephone. In the final episode on October 7, Swift announced the fourth track, "Snow on the Beach", and that it features the American singer-songwriter Lana Del Rey, whom Swift had previously named as one of her favorite music artists.

Swift, Antonoff, and Del Rey wrote "Snow on the Beach", and the first two produced the track. It was recorded by Antonoff and Laura Sisk at Rough Customer Studio in Brooklyn, Electric Lady Studios in New York City, and Henson Recording Studios in Los Angeles. The instruments were recorded at Blue Plate Records in Haworth, New Jersey, and Pleasure Hill Recording in Portland, Maine. Serban Ghenea mixed the song at MixStar Studios in Virginia Beach, Virginia, with assistance from Bryce Bordone, and Randy Merrill mastered it at Sterling Sound in Edgewater, New Jersey.

== Music and lyrics ==
"Snow on the Beach"
The first verse contains plucked strings, chimes, heavily reverberated bass, and other instruments. In the lyrics, Swift discovers an unforeseen affection for someone.

"Snow on the Beach" is a dream pop and bedroom pop tune that runs for 4 minutes and 16 seconds. Its midtempo production contains twinkling synths, strummed violin, chimes, and heavily reverberated bass. Mellisa Ruggieri of USA Today and John Wohlmacher of Beats Per Minute compared its use of bells and plucked strings to holiday music. Del Rey's vocals on the track are minimal and harmonize with Swift's. Various critics deemed the production of the track wintery, (Note: Attributed to USA Today's Melissa Ruggieri, Slant Magazine's Paul Attard, The New York Times's Jon Caramanica, Insider's Callie Ahlgrim, The A.V. Club's Saloni Gajjar, and Beats Per Minute's John Wohlmacher) which Melissa Ruggieri from USA Today compared to The Dream Academy's "Life in a Northern Town" (1985). Hannah Mylrea of NME said the song veers towards the indie folk of Swift's 2020 albums Folklore and Evermore. Brittany Spanos of Rolling Stone likened "Snow on the Beach" to the Folklore track "Mirrorball", because she thought it had a similar dream pop production. Wohlmacher wrote that the track incorporates classical elements and believed it resembles the work of the American composers Philip Glass and Steve Reich.

Lyrically, "Snow on the Beach" is a love song about two people falling in love at the same time. On the track's meaning, Swift said that it is a "sort of in this sort of cataclysmic, fated moment where you realize someone feels exactly the same way that you feel" and she compared the rarity of love to a natural phenomenon of snowing on a beach. The first verse begins with Swift discovering that unforeseen love, which Seventeen's Samantha Olson thought it was done in a similar way to "Long Story Short" (2020). The chorus sees her in a dream-like state and questions it when everything lines up in her new-found relationship; it is also where she is joined by Del Rey. In the second verse, Swift compares the love to something from a movie or watching the aurora borealis. The bridge sees Swift thinking that the love is too good for her and does not want to reveal it to the public. It is also where she references Janet Jackson and her song "All for You" (2001): "Now I'm all for you like Janet/ Can this be a real thing, can it?".

== Release and promotion ==
"Snow on the Beach", along with the rest of Midnights, was released on October 21, 2022, by Republic Records. It was later sent to US triple-A radio as the second single from the album on November 7, following the first single "Anti-Hero". The collaboration between Swift and Del Rey was highly anticipated during the album's lead-up. When it was released, fans and journalists alike questioned the nature of Del Rey's vocal contribution to the track. They thought that Del Rey acted as more of a background vocalist for Swift, deemed as almost indistinguishable from Swift's own vocals by some publications, which surprised fans who expected a duet. In an interview with Billboard, Del Rey stated that she "had no idea [she] was the only feature" on the album and "would have sung the entire second verse like [Swift] wanted" if she had known, but was "more focused on the production" of the song than the vocals. In another interview with Harper's Bazaar, Del Rey said she was "all over" on the track: "I layer and match [Swift's] vocals perfectly". She added that the song was "perfect" and stated that "if it ain't broke, don't fix it".

In response to the reception of the track, a version of the song featuring "More Lana Del Rey" was released as part of The Til Dawn Edition of Midnights on May 26, 2023. The "More Lana" version is 3 minutes and 50 seconds, and on it, Del Rey sings the entire second verse. After Midnights was released, Swift embarked on her sixth concert tour, the Eras Tour in March 2023, and it contained a segment of "surprise songs" where she performs random songs from her discography. Swift sang "Snow on the Beach" as a "surprise song" at the first show in Las Vegas (March 24) and at the second show in Mexico City (August 25). On May 29, 2024, she performed it as part of a mashup with her song "I Look in People's Windows" (2024) at the first Madrid show of the Eras Tour. An instrumental strings version of the track was used in the third season of the American romance series Bridgerton, released in May 2024.

== Critical reception ==
In reviews of Midnights, "Snow on the Beach" received mixed reviews from critics. Those who were more positive of the song praised its lyrics and production. Ruggieri praised the song's "aching beauty and inherent melancholy". Mike DeWald of Riff Magazine deemed the track's production "ethereal" and Paul Attard of Slant Magazine lauded the "exquisite" composition. Rolling Stone's Rob Sheffield called the track a "gorgeous ballad". Chris Willman of Variety and John Murphy of MusicOMH noted the minimal vocals from Del Rey, but nonetheless praised her contributions. Under the Radar's Andy Von Pop described "Snow on the Beach" as a "beautiful love song" and opined that the subtlety of the track is more sophisticated than works by Swift's peers. Gigwise's Lucy Harbron directed acclaim towards the "heavenly harmonies" and the lyrics in its "deepest, rawest form". Likewise, Mikael Wood for the Los Angeles Times deemed the song's imagery the album's most affecting. The Daily Telegraph's Neil McCormick described the song as "sonically adventurous". Spencer Kornhaber of The Atlantic cited the song as an example of Antonoff's musical style that does not make Midnights a repetitive album. John Wohlmacher of Beats Per Minute wrote that Del Rey's vocals added a "subtle shade of melancholia" to contrast the happiness of the lyrics.

Critics deemed Del Rey's contribution on "Snow on the Beach" underwhelming (Note: Attributed to The Observer's Kitty Empire, Clash's Neale Matthew, and Insider's Callie Ahlgrim and Courtney Larocca)—Spanos named the song "the only true disappointment" on Midnights because she thought it was not a "true duet" between Swift and Del Rey. In a more complimentive review, The Guardian music journalist Alexis Petridis said it was far from a "grandstanding summit" between them but nonetheless applauded their "restrained" collaboration and thought it was "beautifully done". Though acknowledging the song as "poetic" and "pretty", the Associated Press's Elise Ryan wrote that the emotional depth of the song did not live up to Swift and Del Rey's potential. Rick Quinn of PopMatters praised the "quiet beauty and arresting imagery" of the track, but nonetheless opined that it leaves the listener wanting more from the collaboration. Some aspects of the production also received mixed reviews: Jon Caramanica for The New York Times commended Del Rey's vocals on the track, but believed that Swift's vocals were too "cheery" for the track to ascend, and Insider's Callie Ahlgrim and Courteney Larocca thought the production was unnecessarily wintry and regarded the track as "background music". The A.V. Club's Saloni Gajjar labeled "Snow on the Beach" one of Midnights's "glaring misfits".

== Commercial performance ==
"Snow on the Beach" opened and peaked at number four on the Billboard Hot 100 in the United States, with 37.2 million streams, 2,600 digital downloads, and 615,000 airplay impressions. The song and nine other Midnights tracks made Swift the first and only artist to occupy the entire top 10 of the Hot 100 at the same time. It also marked Del Rey's first top five entry on the chart and her second top-10 entry after "Summertime Sadness" (2012). After the release of The Til Dawn Edition of Midnights, "Snow on the Beach" re-entered the Hot 100 at number 30. It spent a total of eight weeks on the chart. The song also charted for nine weeks on Adult Alternative Airplay and peaked at number 30.

On the Billboard Global 200, "Snow on the Beach" debuted and peaked at number three, with first-week figures of 84.3 million streams and 4,700 downloads. The song reached the top 10 on national charts: it peaked at number two in Malaysia and Singapore; number three in Australia, Canada, Ireland, and the Philippines; number four in New Zealand, the United Kingdom, and Vietnam; number nine in Portugal; and number ten in Croatia. "Snow on the Beach" has been certified double platinum in Australia, platinum in Brazil, Canada, New Zealand, and the United Kingdom, and gold in France, Mexico, Portugal, and Spain.

== Personnel ==
Credits are adapted from the liner notes of Midnights.

- Taylor Swift – vocals, songwriter, producer
- Lana Del Rey – vocals, songwriter
- Jack Antonoff – songwriter, producer, engineer, synths, drums, programming, percussion, Juno 6, mellotron, acoustic, bass, and electric guitars, background vocals
- Bobby Hawk – violin
- Dylan O'Brien – drums
- Evan Smith – engineer, synths, recording
- Laura Sisk – engineer, recording
- Dave Gross – engineer, recording
- Megan Searl – assistant engineer
- Jon Sher – assistant engineer
- John Rooney – assistant engineer
- Jacob Spitzer – assistant engineer
- Serban Ghenea – mix engineer
- Bryce Bordone – assistant mix engineer
- Randy Merrill – mastering engineer

== Charts ==
Chart performance for "Snow on the Beach"
Chart (2022–23)	Peak position
Argentina Hot 100 (Billboard)	84
Australia (ARIA)	3
Austria (Ö3 Austria Top 40)	12
Belgium (Ultratop 50 Flanders)	50
Canada Hot 100 (Billboard)	3
Croatia (Billboard)	10
Czech Republic Singles Digital (ČNS IFPI)	16
Denmark (Tracklisten)	24
France (SNEP)	69
Germany (GfK)	74
Global 200 (Billboard)	3
Greece International (IFPI)	5
Greece International (IFPI) More Lana version	25
Hong Kong (Billboard)	15
Hungary (Stream Top 40)	24
Iceland (Tónlistinn)	11
Indonesia (Billboard)	20
India International Singles (IMI)	9
Ireland (IRMA)	3
Italy (FIMI)	59
Lithuania (AGATA)	13
Luxembourg (Billboard)	13
Malaysia (Billboard)	2
Malaysia International (RIM)	2
Netherlands (Single Top 100)	25
New Zealand (Recorded Music NZ)	4
Norway (VG-lista)	16
Philippines (Billboard)	3
Portugal (AFP)	9
Singapore (RIAS)	2
Slovakia (Singles Digitál Top 100)	18
South Africa (RISA)	13
Spain (Promusicae)	35
Sweden (Sverigetopplistan)	16
Switzerland (Schweizer Hitparade)	16
UK Singles (Official Charts)	4
US Billboard Hot 100	4
US Adult Alternative Airplay (Billboard)	30
Vietnam Hot 100 (Billboard)	4

== Certifications ==
Certifications for "Snow on the Beach"
Region	Certification	Certified units/sales
Australia (ARIA)	2× Platinum	140,000^{‡}
Brazil (Pro-Música Brasil)	Platinum	40,000^{‡}
Canada (Music Canada)	Platinum	80,000^{‡}
France (SNEP)	Gold	100,000^{‡}
Mexico (AMPROFON)	Gold	70,000^{‡}
New Zealand (RMNZ)	Platinum	30,000^{‡}
Portugal (AFP)	Gold	5,000^{‡}
Spain (Promusicae)	Gold	30,000^{‡}
United Kingdom (BPI)	Platinum	600,000^{‡}
^{‡} Sales+streaming figures based on certification alone.
