= The Grants =

2023 single by Lana Del Rey

Single by Lana Del Rey

from the album Did You Know That There's a Tunnel Under Ocean Blvd
- Released: March 14, 2023
- Genre: Gospel
- Length: 4:55
- Label: Interscope; Polydor
- Songwriters: Lana Del Rey; Mike Hermosa
- Producers: Lana Del Rey; Drew Erickson; Zach Dawes

Lana Del Rey singles chronology
"A&W" (2023)	"The Grants" (2023)	"Say Yes to Heaven" (2023)

Audio video
- "The Grants" on YouTube

"The Grants" is a song written by Lana Del Rey and Mike Hermosa, and recorded by Del Rey for her ninth studio album, Did You Know That There's a Tunnel Under Ocean Blvd (2023). Del Rey served as one of the song's producers, along with Drew Erickson and Zach Dawes. It was released through Interscope and Polydor Records on March 14, 2023 as the third single from the album. The song debuted on BBC Radio 1's Future Sounds with Clara Amfo as Radio 1's Hottest Record.

== Background and release ==
On December 7, 2022, American singer-songwriter Lana Del Rey said her ninth studio album, Did You Know That There's a Tunnel Under Ocean Blvd, was due for release sometime in early 2023. To accompany the announcement, she made the album available for preorder and released its title track, "Did You Know That There's a Tunnel Under Ocean Blvd", as a single.

Del Rey announced the album's cover art and list of songs the following month. Apart from the title track, which is the second on the list, a song named "A&W" appears as the fourth track and "The Grants" as the opener. "A&W" was the next single from the album, released on February 14, 2023, and "The Grants" was the first promotional single. Del Rey released it on March 14.

== Music and lyrics ==
"The Grants" was written by Del Rey alongside Mike Hermosa. The gospel song is built around soft piano chords alongside harmonizing background vocals. Melodye Perry, Pattie Howard, and Shikena Jones provide the background vocals, all of whom appeared in 20 Feet from Stardom, a 2013 documentary that focused on the lives of background vocalists. The song begins with their attempts to sing the chorus, with some instruction among one of them: "One more time, you ready?"

In "The Grants", Del Rey reinforces the gospel-influenced composition through the lyrics. She uses religious imagery to address either a lover or a family member who might disappear from her life soon and says she will always remember her memories of them.

Do you think about Heaven? Do you think about me?

My pastor told me, 'When you leave, all you take is your memories.'

And I'm gonna take mine of you with me.

Del Rey spoke to Billboard that much of her album revolves around her family affairs; "The Grants" derives the name after the family of Del Rey, whose real name is Elizabeth Grant. It references her uncle who died during a climb to the Rocky Mountains through the lyrics "Like 'Rocky Mountain High' / The way John Denver sings". An ode to her other family members can be found in the bridge:

My sister's first-born child, I'm gonna take that too with me.

My grandmother's last smile, I'm gonna take that too with me.

It's a beautiful life. Remember that too for me.

== Reception ==
Billboard ranked "The Grants" as the album's second-best track, praising its gospel-tinged sound and reflection on legacy over religion. Del Rey's lyrics, they noted, frame personal and artistic effort as a tribute to family past and future.

== Charts ==
Chart performance for "The Grants"
Chart (2023)	Peak position
New Zealand Hot Singles (RMNZ)	35
US Hot Rock & Alternative Songs (Billboard)	31
