= Did You Know That There's a Tunnel Under Ocean Blvd =

- Standard cover

Studio album by Lana Del Rey
- Released: March 24, 2023
- Recorded: 2018; 2021–2022
- Studios: Black Door (Sammamish, Washington); Real World (Wiltshire, England)
- Genres: Alternative pop; Americana
- Length: 77:52
- Labels: Interscope; Polydor
- Producers: Lana Del Rey; Benji Lysaght; Drew Erickson; Jack Antonoff; Laura Sisk; Mike Hermosa; Zach Dawes

Lana Del Rey chronology
Blue Banisters (2021)	Did You Know That There's a Tunnel Under Ocean Blvd (2023)	Stove (2027)

Singles from Did You Know That There's a Tunnel Under Ocean Blvd
- 1. "Did You Know That There's a Tunnel Under Ocean Blvd" Released: December 7, 2022; 2. "A&W" Released: February 14, 2023; 3. "The Grants" Released: March 14, 2023; 4. "Candy Necklace" Released: October 6, 2023

Did You Know That There's a Tunnel Under Ocean Blvd is the ninth studio album by American singer-songwriter Lana Del Rey. Released on March 24, 2023, by Interscope and Polydor Records, the album features production by Del Rey, Mike Hermosa, Jack Antonoff, Drew Erickson, Zach Dawes, and Benji Lysaght. It includes collaborations with Jon Batiste, Bleachers, Father John Misty, Tommy Genesis, SYML, and Riopy.

The album received generally positive reviews from music critics, with most of them praising Del Rey's lyricism and some criticizing the production. It was ranked among the best albums of 2023 by various publications, and was nominated for Album of the Year and Best Alternative Music Album at the 66th Annual Grammy Awards. Commercially, the album topped the record charts in eight countries and reached the top-five in over 20 countries, including the United States, where it peaked at number three on the US Billboard 200.

Two singles and one promotional single preceded the release of the album: the title track was released as the lead single on December 7, 2022, while "A&W" was released as the album's second on February 14, 2023. The release of the third single, "The Grants", followed one month later on March 14, 2023, and the fourth single "Candy Necklace", was released on October 6, 2023. To promote the album, Del Rey embarked on a tour throughout 2023 and headlined several festivals in 2024.

== Background and recording ==
Work on the album started shortly after the release of her eighth studio album, Blue Banisters, in October 2021. Lana Del Rey departed from her world-building, found in her other work, in favor of a conversational style, relying on a process she named "automatic singing". She would sing whatever came to her mind into the voice notes application on her phone, later "sending those really raw-sounding" recordings to composer Drew Erickson, who would add reverb to her vocals, as well as an orchestral instrumental. The first song written for the album, "Fingertips", was recorded this way, with no prior writing.

Del Rey eventually began working with other collaborators. She began working with Mike Hermosa, a prominent collaborator on the album, when he would visit Del Rey and play her piano. Del Rey would hear him play and ask to record to the melody. Towards the end of production, Del Rey brought in previous collaborator, Jack Antonoff.

The Jergins Tunnel below the Jergins Trust Building in Long Beach, California, the tunnel under Ocean Boulevard to which the title refers, is used as a symbol to express Del Rey's fear of being forgotten. This tunnel was built in 1927 but was closed in 1967.

== Composition ==
Did You Know That There's a Tunnel Under Ocean Blvd is an Americana and alternative pop album by experimenting with a fusion of 'Seventies FM piano pop', hip-hop, and dance production, as well as influences of gospel, folk, trap, electro-jazz, soul, and psychedelic music. The album is in contrast with Del Rey's traditional approach of "world-building", found in her other work, such as in Norman Fucking Rockwell! (2019). Del Rey called the creation of the album "totally effortless", saying that she wanted the music to have "a spiritual element". Produced by Del Rey with frequent collaborator Jack Antonoff, Mike Hermosa, Drew Erickson, Zach Dawes, and Benji, the album features guest appearances from Jon Batiste, SYML, Riopy, Father John Misty, Bleachers (led by Antonoff), and Tommy Genesis.

=== Songs ===
The album opens with the song "The Grants". Titled after her family name, the song serves as an ode to her family. The song is followed by the album's title track. "Margaret", the thirteenth track, was inspired by Antonoff's fiancée at that time, Margaret Qualley, and features Antonoff's band, Bleachers. "Kintsugi" and "Fingertips" were described by Del Rey as "super long and wordy", containing her "innermost thoughts". The title of "Paris, Texas" is a reference to the 1984 movie of the same name and samples SYML's "I Wanted to Leave". "Grandfather please stand on the shoulders of my father while he's deep-sea fishing" samples Riopy's piano track "Flo". The album closes with "Taco Truck x VB," which features an early demo of her 2018 single "Venice Bitch" from Norman Fucking Rockwell! (2019). Del Rey described the version of "Venice Bitch" featured on the song as "the grimy, heavy, original and unheard version" of the song.

== Artwork ==
The album artwork was shot by Del Rey's frequent collaborator, Neil Krug, and chosen from 65 different images, including one where the singer appeared nude. Speaking on the decision not to use the nude image, Del Rey said she "wanted to reveal something about myself that I actually thought was beautiful", but later wondered if the decision to appear nude was an artistic expression or would be seen as fulfilling a need to be seen. She ultimately decided against using the photo to "let the songs do the talking for now". The nude image was finally used for a limited vinyl edition.

== Release and promotion ==
Originally slated for a March 10, 2023, release, the album was pushed to March 24 on January 13, 2023, for undisclosed reasons. The album's track listing was revealed on January 13, 2023. Did You Know That There's a Tunnel Under Ocean Blvd was issued worldwide on March 24, 2023, in several formats, including vinyl record and cassette tape.

To promote the album, Del Rey made several promotional appearances. The album was announced and made available to preorder on December 7, 2022. Del Rey covered the March 2023 issue of Interview where she was interviewed by Billie Eilish. She was interviewed by Kristin Robinson for a Billboard feature over Del Rey winning the inaugural Visionary Award at the 2023 Billboard Women in Music Awards.

Del Rey embarked on a tour throughout 2023 in support of the album. Spanning 27 dates and visiting 9 countries, it kicked off on May 27, in Rio de Janeiro, Brazil, and concluded on October 5, in Charleston, United States. In 2024, she headlined several music festivals, including the Coachella, Reading and Leeds, Primavera Sound, Rock en Seine, and Hangout festivals.

=== Singles ===
Three singles have been released from Did You Know That There's a Tunnel Under Ocean Blvd. The album's title track was released with the album's preorder with no prior announcement as the lead single from the album on December 7, 2022. The song peaked at number 23 on the US Billboard Hot Rock & Alternative Songs chart and received positive reviews from critics. "A&W" was released as the album's second single on February 14, 2023. The song peaked at number 10 on the US Billboard Hot Rock & Alternative Songs chart, and reached number five on the Bubbling Under Hot 100 chart. "A&W" generated critical acclaim for its experimental production and lyrics. "The Grants" was released on March 14, 2023, as the third single from the album. "The Grants", was debuted on BBC Radio 1's Future Sounds with Clara Amfo program, and was subsequently released on streaming platforms. The song peaked at number 35 on the New Zealand Hot Singles chart. "Candy Necklace" was released as a single on October 6, 2023, as the fourth single from the album.

== Critical reception ==
Did You Know That There's a Tunnel Under Ocean Blvd ratings
Aggregate scores
Source	Rating
AnyDecentMusic?	7.7/10
Metacritic	80/100
Review scores
Source	Rating
AllMusic	4/5 stars
Beats Per Minute	84%
The Daily Telegraph	3/5 stars
Exclaim!	9/10
The Guardian	4/5 stars
The Independent	4/5 stars
NME	4/5 stars
The Observer	4/5 stars
Pitchfork	8.3/10
Under the Radar	8.5/10

Did You Know That There's a Tunnel Under Ocean Blvd was met with generally positive reviews. At Metacritic, which assigns a rating out of 100 to reviews from professional publications, the album received a weighted average score of 80, based on 25 reviews, indicating "generally favorable reviews". Aggregator AnyDecentMusic? gave it 7.7 out of 10, based on their assessment of the critical consensus.

In a review for Clash, Robin Murray dubbed the album "an ambitious, at times unsettling record", anchored both in classicism and experimentation, but "never truly succumbs to either." Lucy Harbon of Gigwise called the album Del Rey's magnum opus, and lauded her vocal performance and references to her own past work. Writing for The Guardian, Shaad D'Souza called the album "her quietest, most wilfully inscrutable record" since Honeymoon (2015). Annabel Nugent of The Independent described the album as "sweeping, layered" and "ruminative", pointing out that some of the songs "can be repetitive, but [...] alluring." In a review for NME, Rhian Daly's pointed out that Del Rey "steps into new lyrical territory" in the album, as well as "new sonic worlds", cementing Del Rey as one of modern music's "most intriguing" songwriters. Pitchfork's Olivia Horn named the album "Best New Music". The site also called it a "sweeping, sterling, often confounding work of self-mythology and psychoamericana." Noah Ciubotaru of Exclaim! said, "Beyond simply toggling between different Lana eras, several songs on Did You Know synthesize the personality-driven pop genius and the hyper-specific singer-songwriter, demonstrating how tight a grasp she maintains on her multi-faceted vision and how drastically she's evolved as an artist". Tom Williams of Beats Per Minute gave a positive review, stating, "Like any good, honest work of self-exploration, Ocean Blvd is sprawling [...] and not without the occasionally questionable choice. But the best moments, which abound, solidify Del Rey as one of the all-time greats".

In mixed reviews, Paul Attard of Slant Magazine called the album "one of Del Rey's most obtuse artistic statements to date." Attard criticized the album's duration, calling it "bloated", but praised moments such as "A&W" and "Paris, Texas". The Line of Best Fit writer, Liam Inscoe-Jones opined that the songs are "easily among her most complicated, emotionally", but criticized its interludes, as well as the songs at the end of the tracklist. Lisa Wright of DIY noted that the album is some of Del Rey's best work, but "doesn't always completely land". Regarding the album as style over substance, Neil McCormick of The Daily Telegraph found the album boring and lacking ambition, criticizing the dull production, repetitive themes, "baggy" lyrics, "dreadful" pace, and "shapeless" songs. The Arts Desk critic Thomas H Green said, "It sprawls. It could do with an edit, but as so often when talented musicians sprawl, there are also gems".

=== Rankings ===
Select rankings of Did You Know That There's a Tunnel Under Ocean Blvd
Critic/Publication	List	Rank	Ref.
Billboard	The 50 Best Albums of 2023	9	
Dazed	The 20 Best Albums of 2023	1	
Entertainment Weekly	The 10 Best Albums of 2023	6	
The Independent	The 30 Best Albums of 2023	8	
Los Angeles Times	The 20 Best Albums of 2023	10	
People	Top 10 Albums of 2023	2	
Pitchfork	The 50 Best Albums of 2023	11	
Pitchfork	The 100 Best Albums of the 2020s So Far	16	
Rolling Stone	The 100 Best Albums of 2023	21	
Slant Magazine	The 50 Best Albums of 2023	1	
Variety	The Best Albums of 2023	2	

== Accolades ==
Did You Know That There's a Tunnel Under Ocean Blvd was nominated for Album of the Year and Best Alternative Music Album at the 66th Annual Grammy Awards.

Awards and nominations for Did You Know That There's a Tunnel Under Ocean Blvd
Organization	Year	Category	Result	Ref.
Bestsellery Empiku (Poland)	2024	Music: Pop	Nominated	
Gaffa Awards (Sweden)	2024	International Album of the Year	Won	
Grammy Awards	2024	Album of the Year	Nominated	
Grammy Awards	2024	Best Alternative Music Album	Nominated	
Purecharts Awards (France)	2024	International Album of the Year	Won	

== Commercial performance ==
Did You Know That There's a Tunnel Under Ocean Blvd debuted at number one in the UK with 41,000 sales (9,000 CDs, 20,000 vinyl albums, 2,000 cassettes, and 998 digital downloads, as well as 7,000 units from sales-equivalent streams). The album became one of Del Rey's best first week sales in the UK. It became Del Rey's sixth number-one album in the UK as well as the fastest-selling album of 2023 in the UK. The album was the 3rd best selling vinyl album in the UK in 2023.

In the United States, Did You Know That There's a Tunnel Under Ocean Blvd opened at number three on the Billboard 200 chart with 115,000 album-equivalent units, of which 87,000 were traditional sales, while earning an additional 28,000 units from 36.14 million on-demand streams. It is Del Rey's biggest opening week sales since 2015's Honeymoon, and became her ninth project to debut inside the top 10 of the Billboard 200. On its second week, it dropped to number 10, selling 38,000 units. The album charted for 41 weeks on the Billboard 200 becoming her 4th longest charting project on the chart, and her 3rd longest charting album. The album sold 215,000 vinyl copies in 2023 in the US.

== Track listing ==
Did You Know That There's a Tunnel Under Ocean Blvd track listing
No.	Title	Writer(s)	Producer(s)	Length
1.	"The Grants"	Lana Del Rey; Mike Hermosa	Del Rey; Drew Erickson; Zach Dawes	4:55
2.	"Did You Know That There's a Tunnel Under Ocean Blvd"	Del Rey; Hermosa	Del Rey; Hermosa; Jack Antonoff; Erickson; Dawes	4:45
3.	"Sweet"	Del Rey; Erickson	Del Rey; Erickson	3:36
4.	"A&W"	Del Rey; Antonoff; Sam Dew	Del Rey; Antonoff	7:13
5.	"Judah Smith Interlude"	Del Rey; Antonoff; Judah Smith	Del Rey; Antonoff	4:36
6.	"Candy Necklace" (featuring Jon Batiste)	Del Rey; Jon Batiste	Del Rey; Dawes; Nick Waterhouse^{[a]}; Ian Doerr^{[a]}	5:14
7.	"Jon Batiste Interlude"	Del Rey; Batiste	Del Rey; Antonoff; Dawes	3:33
8.	"Kintsugi"	Del Rey; Antonoff	Del Rey; Antonoff	6:18
9.	"Fingertips"	Del Rey; Erickson	Erickson	5:48
10.	"Paris, Texas" (featuring SYML)	Del Rey; Brian Fennell	Del Rey; Antonoff	3:26
11.	"Grandfather Please Stand on the Shoulders of My Father While He's Deep-Sea Fishing"	Del Rey; Riopy	Del Rey; Antonoff	4:00
12.	"Let the Light In" (featuring Father John Misty)	Del Rey; Hermosa; Benji Lysaght	Del Rey; Erickson; Hermosa	4:38
13.	"Margaret" (featuring Bleachers)	Del Rey; Antonoff	Del Rey; Antonoff	5:39
14.	"Fishtail"	Del Rey; Antonoff; Aljosha Frederick Konstanty; Ann Tomberlin	Del Rey; Antonoff	4:02
15.	"Peppers" (featuring Tommy Genesis)	Del Rey; Genesis; Hermosa; Lysaght	Del Rey; Antonoff; Lysaght	4:08
16.	"Taco Truck x VB"	Lana Del Rey; Antonoff; Hermosa	Del Rey; Antonoff	5:53
Total length:				77:52

Notes

- ^{^[a]} indicates an additional producer

=== Samples and interpolations ===
- "Sweet" contains an interpolation of "Wait for Life", written by Emile Haynie, Lana Del Rey, and Thomas Bartlett and performed by Del Rey.
- "A&W" contains a sample of "Norman Fucking Rockwell", written by Del Rey and Jack Antonoff and performed by Del Rey and an interpolation of "Shimmy, Shimmy, Ko-Ko-Bop", written by Bob Smith and performed by Little Anthony and the Imperials.
- "Paris, Texas" contains a sample "I Wanted to Leave", written by Brian Fennell and performed by SYML.
- "Grandfather Please Stand on the Shoulders of My Father While He's Deep-Sea Fishing" contains a sample of "Flo", written and performed by Riopy.
- "Fishtail" contains a sample of "Wanderlust", written and performed by Aljosha Frederick Konstanty.
- "Peppers" contains a sample of "Angelina", written and performed by Tommy Genesis.
- "Taco Truck x VB" contains an earlier version of "Venice Bitch", written by Del Rey and Antonoff and performed by Del Rey.

== Personnel ==
Credits adapted from official liner notes.

=== Musicians ===
- Lana Del Rey – vocals (all tracks), background vocals (tracks 1–4, 12, 13, 15, 16), glockenspiel (4), whistle (8)
- Mike Hermosa – acoustic guitar (1, 2, 12, 15), piano (12)
- Melodye Perry – background vocals (1, 2)
- Pattie Howard – background vocals (1, 2)
- Shikena Jones – background vocals (1, 2)
- Zach Dawes – bass guitar (1, 12)
- Benji Lysaght – electric guitar (1, 12, 15), acoustic guitar (2, 12), sound effects (2), 12-string acoustic guitar (12)
- Drew Erickson – piano, string arrangement, synth bass (1–3, 9, 12); Hammond B3, strings (1, 9, 12); synthesizer (1, 12), conductor (2, 3), organ (3); Mellotron, synth pads, Wurlitzer electronic piano (9); drums (12)
- Jack Antonoff – drums (2, 4, 7, 8, 13–16), programming (2, 4, 5, 7, 13–16), synth bass (2, 4, 10, 11, 14, 16), electric guitar (2, 5, 7, 10, 11, 13–16), piano (4, 5, 7, 8, 10, 11, 13, 14, 16), Mellotron (4, 7, 10, 11, 13, 14, 16), acoustic guitar (4, 8, 10, 11, 13, 15), synth pads (4, 11), 12-string acoustic guitar (4, 13, 14), bells (4, 15), Moog bass (4), bass guitar (7, 13), synthesizer (8, 13–16), vocals (13, 16); background vocals, banjo (13); keyboards (16)
- Christine Kim – cello (2, 3)
- Jake Braun – cello (2, 3)
- Logan Hone – clarinet, saxophone (2)
- Jim Keltner – drums (2)
- Andrew Bulbrook – violin (2, 3)
- Charlie Bisharat – violin (2, 3)
- Paul J. Cartwright – violin (2, 3)
- Wynton Grant – violin (2, 3)
- Sam Dew – background vocals (4)
- Judah Smith – vocals (5)
- Connor Gallaher – acoustic guitar, baritone guitar, pedal steel (6)
- Ian Doerr – celesta, Mellotron, Rhodes, string arrangement (6)
- Felix Havstad Ziska – cello, string arrangement, violin (6)
- Brian Long – double bass (6)
- Jackson MacIntosh – electric guitar (6)
- Nick Waterhouse – electric guitar (6)
- Will Worden – electric guitar (6)
- Jon Batiste – piano (6, 7), vocals (7)
- Brian Fennell – piano (10)
- Riopy – piano (11)
- Evan Smith – saxophone (11, 13)
- Josh Tillman – vocals (12)
- Sean Hutchinson – drums (13)
- Mikey Freedom Hart – electric guitar, synthesizer (13)
- Mike Riddleberger – piano (13)
- Zem Audu – saxophones (13)
- Chuck Grant – speaker (14)
- Gus Seyffert – bass guitar, keyboards (15)
- Carla Azar – drums (15)
- Phoenix Grant – synthesizer (15)
- Tommy Genesis – vocals (15)
- Margaret Qualley – speaker (16)

=== Technical ===
- Ruairi O'Flaherty – mastering
- Dick Beetham – mastering (11)
- Dean Reid – mixing (1, 3, 6, 9, 12), engineering (1–3, 9, 12)
- Laura Sisk – mixing, engineering (2, 4, 5, 7, 8, 10, 11, 13–16)
- Jack Antonoff – mixing (2, 4, 5, 7, 8, 10, 11, 13–16), engineering (4, 5, 7, 8, 10, 11, 13–16)
- Michael Harris – mixing (3), engineering (2, 3, 9, 12, 15)
- Ian Doerr – engineering (6, 7)
- Kaleb Rollins – engineering (6, 7)
- Brian Fennell – engineering (10)
- Oli Jacobs – engineering (11)
- Evan Smith – engineering (13)
- Mike Riddleberger – engineering (13)
- Mikey Freedom Hart – engineering (13)
- Marc Whitmore – engineer (7)
- Sean Hutchinson – engineering (13)
- Zem Audu – engineering (13)
- Jon Sher – engineering assistance (1–5, 7–16)
- Mark Aguilar – engineering assistance (1, 2, 10–16)
- Bill Mims – engineering assistance (1, 2, 12)
- Ben Fletcher – engineering assistance (2, 3)
- Megan Searl – engineering assistance (2, 4, 5, 7–11, 13–16)
- Brian Rajaratnam – engineering assistance (2, 8, 10, 11, 14, 15)
- Matt Tuggle – engineering assistance (2, 8, 10, 11, 14, 15)
- Ivan Handwerk – engineering assistance (2, 3)
- Daniel Cayotte – engineering assistance (4)
- Rémy Dumelz – engineering assistance (4)
- Bobby Mota – engineering assistance (6)
- Gregg White – engineering assistance (6)

== Charts ==
=== Weekly charts ===
Weekly chart performance for Did You Know That There's a Tunnel Under Ocean Blvd
Chart (2023)	Peak position
Australian Albums (ARIA)	1
Austrian Albums (Ö3 Austria)	4
Belgian Albums (Ultratop Flanders)	1
Belgian Albums (Ultratop Wallonia)	2
Canadian Albums (Billboard)	3
Croatian International Albums (HDU)	2
Czech Albums (ČNS IFPI)	10
Danish Albums (Hitlisten)	6
Dutch Albums (Album Top 100)	1
Finnish Albums (Suomen virallinen lista)	6
French Albums (SNEP)	2
German Albums (Offizielle Top 100)	3
Greek Albums (IFPI)	1
Hungarian Albums (MAHASZ)	8
Icelandic Albums (Tónlistinn)	4
Irish Albums (Official Charts)	1
Italian Albums (FIMI)	8
Lithuanian Albums (AGATA)	4
New Zealand Albums (RMNZ)	1
Norwegian Albums (VG-lista)	2
Polish Albums (ZPAV)	4
Portuguese Albums (AFP)	1
Scottish Albums (Official Charts)	1
Slovak Albums (ČNS IFPI)	13
Spanish Albums (Promusicae)	6
Swedish Albums (Sverigetopplistan)	6
Swiss Albums (Schweizer Hitparade)	4
UK Albums (Official Charts)	1
US Billboard 200	3
US Top Rock & Alternative Albums (Billboard)	1

=== Year-end charts ===
2023 year-end chart performance for Did You Know That There's a Tunnel Under Ocean Blvd
Chart (2023)	Position
Australian Albums (ARIA)	69
Belgian Albums (Ultratop Flanders)	37
Belgian Albums (Ultratop Wallonia)	73
Dutch Albums (Album Top 100)	83
French Albums (SNEP)	80
German Albums (Offizielle Top 100)	46
Polish Albums (ZPAV)	59
Spanish Albums (PROMUSICAE)	75
Swiss Albums (Schweizer Hitparade)	84
UK Albums (OCC)	46
US Billboard 200	127

2024 year-end chart performance for Did You Know That There's a Tunnel Under Ocean Blvd
Chart (2024)	Position
Belgian Albums (Ultratop Flanders)	144

== Certifications ==
Certifications for Did You Know That There's a Tunnel Under Ocean Blvd
Region	Certification	Certified units/sales
Brazil (Pro-Música Brasil)	Platinum	40,000^{‡}
Canada (Music Canada)	Gold	40,000^{‡}
Denmark (IFPI Danmark)	Gold	10,000^{‡}
France (SNEP)	Gold	50,000^{‡}
New Zealand (RMNZ)	Gold	7,500^{‡}
Poland (ZPAV)	Platinum	20,000^{‡}
United Kingdom (BPI)	Gold	100,000^{‡}
^{‡} Sales+streaming figures based on certification alone.

== Release history ==
Release dates and formats for Did You Know That There's a Tunnel Under Ocean Blvd
Region	Date	Label(s)	Format(s)	Ref.
Various	March 24, 2023	Interscope; Polydor	CD; digital download; streaming; vinyl; cassette	
Japan	March 31, 2023	Universal Music Japan	CD	
