= Margaret (song) =

2023 song by Lana Del Rey

Song by Lana Del Rey featuring Bleachers

from the album Did You Know That There's a Tunnel Under Ocean Blvd
- Written: September 2022
- Released: March 24, 2023
- Genre: Soft rock
- Length: 5:39
- Label: Interscope; Polydor
- Songwriters: Elizabeth Grant; Jack Antonoff
- Producers: Elizabeth Grant; Jack Antonoff

Audio video
- "Margaret" on YouTube

"Margaret" is a song by American singer-songwriter Lana Del Rey featuring American rock band Bleachers, from Del Rey's ninth studio album Did You Know That There's a Tunnel Under Ocean Blvd (2023). Named after actress Margaret Qualley, the then-fiancée of Del Rey's frequent collaborator Jack Antonoff, the song reflects on their relationship. A love ballad, the song received positive reviews from critics.

== Background ==
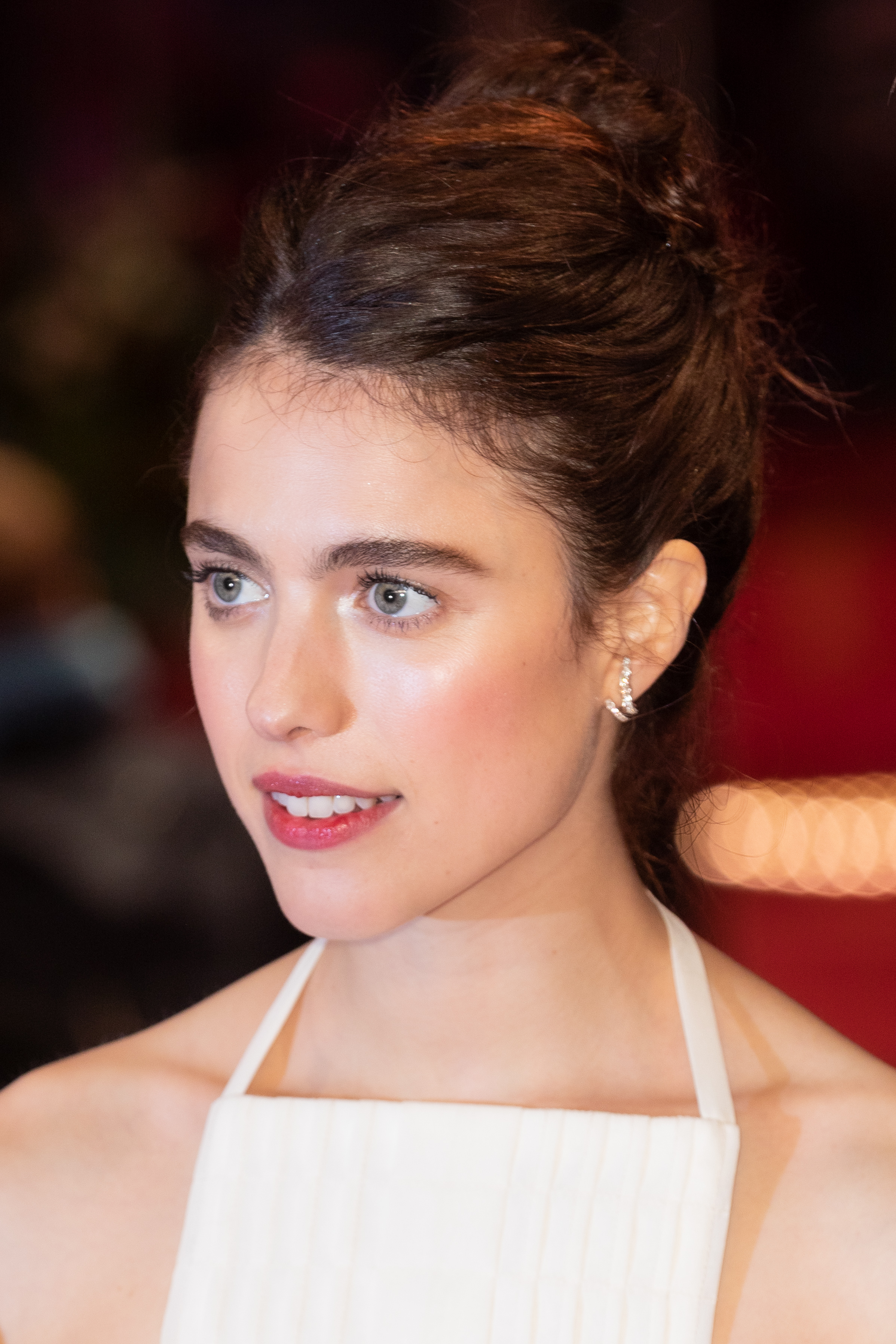
American actress Margaret Qualley, whom the song is named after

Margaret was the last song written for Del Rey's ninth studio album Did You Know That There's a Tunnel Under Ocean Blvd, written in September 2022. The song is a tribute to her long-time collaborator Jack Antonoff and his then-fiancée Margaret Qualley, for whom the song is named. The song is written and produced by Del Rey and Antonoff, and features Bleachers. "Margaret" narrates how Antonoff and Qualley first met. Del Rey got the inspiration for the song after listening to Antonoff playing the piano and singing. The song is described as a ballad and a love song, with the chorus repeating the phrase "When you know, you know". Del Rey addressed the lyric by saying Antonoff and Qualley's relationship was a "when you know you know" situation. Qualley and Antonoff announced their separation in July 2026, after three years of marriage.

== Live and cover versions ==
Del Rey performed the song for the first time in April 2023 with Antonoff at the High Water Festival. She later performed the song with Antonoff at the All Things Go Music Festival during her headlining set in October 2023, with Qualley in the crowd. American singer Jeff Tweedy joined Bleachers to cover the song in May 2024. Bleachers performed an acoustic version of the song at the Calgary Stampede in July 2025.

== Reception ==
Qualley referred to the song as "one of the craziest things to ever happen [to her]", further stating that she adored Del Rey. She said she cried during her first listen of the song. The Los Angeles Times referred to the song as "tender". NME called "Margaret" one of the most "beautiful and moving" songs of the record. Billboard ranked the song number 9 from the album's 16 tracks, noting that Antonoff's deep and "wobbly" voice provided a pleasant contrast to Del Rey's. The Independent praised the song, calling it the album's highlight.

The lyric "I mean, join the party/By the way, the party is December 18" led to speculation that Del Rey had leaked the pair's wedding date. Qualley denied it, stating that Del Rey was "kind enough" to not put the real wedding date in the song. The couple were married on August 19, 2023.

== Charts ==
Chart performance for "Margaret"
Chart (2023)	Peak position
US Hot Rock & Alternative Songs (Billboard)	34

== Certifications ==
Certifications for "Margaret"
Region	Certification	Certified units/sales
Brazil (Pro-Música Brasil)	Diamond	160,000^{‡}
Poland (ZPAV)	Gold	25,000^{‡}
New Zealand (RMNZ)	Gold	15,000^{‡}
United Kingdom (BPI)	Silver	200,000^{‡}
^{‡} Sales+streaming figures based on certification alone.
