= Riopy =

French-British pianist and composer (born 1983)

RIOPY
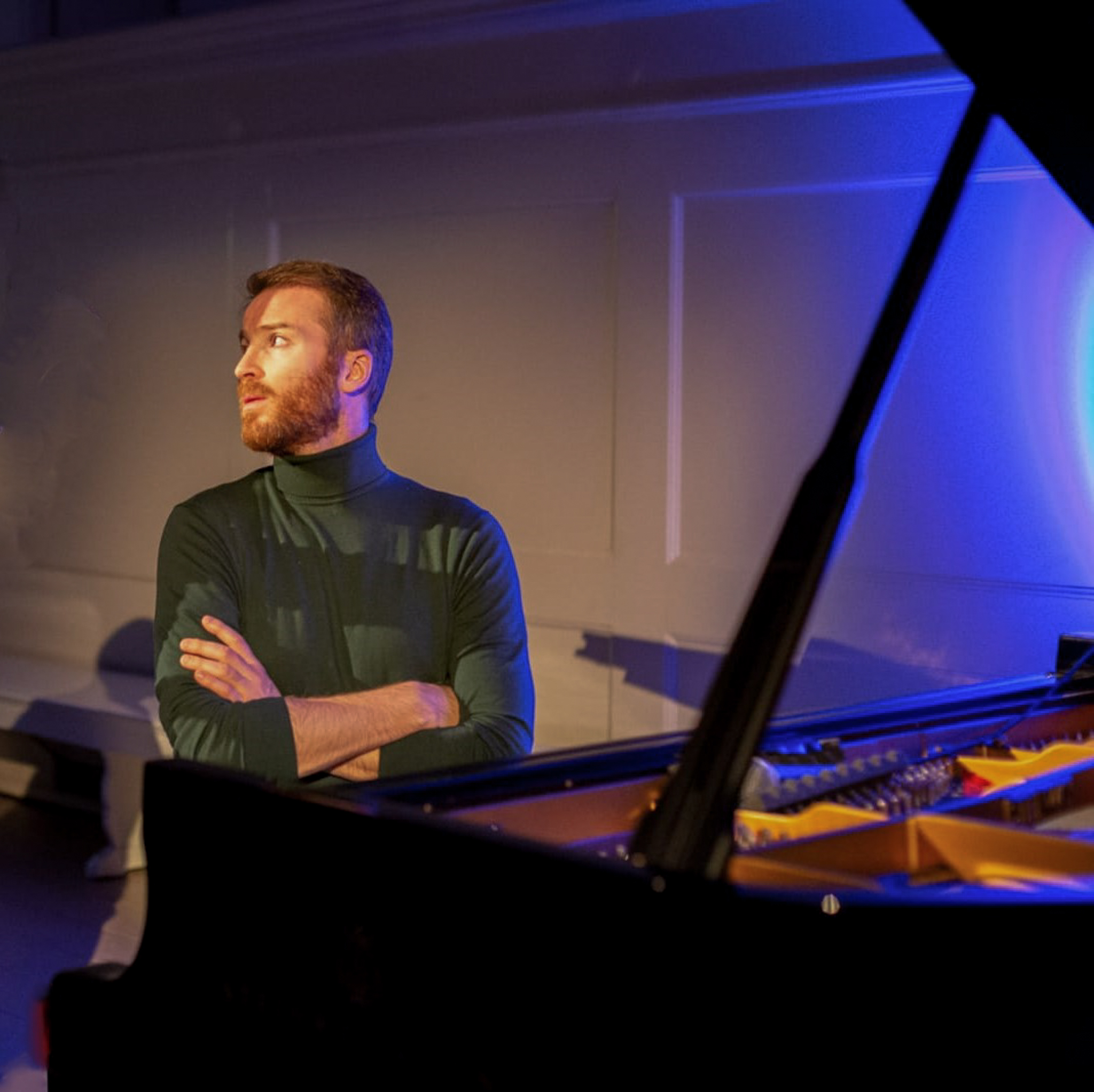

Background information
- Born: Jean-Philippe Rio-Py; 1983 (age 42–43); France
- Genres: Contemporary classical music, Film score
- Occupations: Pianist, Musician, Composer, Producer
- Instrument: Piano
- Years active: 2007–present
- Label: Warner Music
- Website: www.riopy.com

Jean-Philippe Rio-Py (born 1983), known professionally as Riopy (styled RIOPY), is a French-British pianist and composer. Self-taught since a very young age, he has performed internationally, and released several albums classified as crossover or contemporary classical music. His compositions have been featured in commercials, movie trailers, and feature films.

In January 2022, RIOPY's album Tree of Light reached No. 1 on the US Billboard Classical Album chart after a continuous 70 weeks in the top 10.

== Early life and career ==
Born and raised in France, RIOPY is a self-taught pianist who grew up in a secular cult with his family. RIOPY began to teach himself the piano at an early age when he discovered an abandoned instrument. Without access to printed scores, he began to compose music in his head. His unique, rhythmically driven approach to performing his own compositions soon brought him to the attention of the piano firm Steinway & Sons who chose him to be a Young Steinway Artist when he was 17 years old. A year later, he left his home and the cult, which did not allow music, and spent short periods in Paris and Los Angeles.

RIOPY arrived in London at 21 years old, where he worked at a small instruments shop for a few months. There, he soon met Michael Freeman, who recognized his potential and offered him a course at Oxford Brookes University. In 2006, he was then discovered at Oxford where he began his training before embarking on his professional career in London. In 2007, he gave one of his first concerts at Jacqueline Du Pré Building and the Holywell Music Room in Oxford.

In 2010, he performed at the Royal Opera House and opened the first night re-launch for the renowned The Arts Club in Mayfair in 2011. The same year, he performed at a Gala dinner in London organized by Vanity Fair, where Gwyneth Paltrow and her husband at the time, Chris Martin, were also present. The singer thanked him for his performance and three weeks later, offered him his first personal piano, a Steinway & Sons. Later, in 2018, he recorded his first album RIOPY on the same piano.

== Music career ==
=== Performances ===
RIOPY has performed at prestigious venues worldwide, including in London, UK: Royal Opera House, inside St Pancras Clock, The Arts Club; Steinway Hall; in Paris, France: Salle Pleyel, Théâtre des Champs-Elysées; in Villa Reale (Milan, Italy), and in the underground venue of Chateau Marmont (Los Angeles, USA). He has also performed at City Hall Stockholm (Stockholm, Sweden), and in Portugal, the Netherlands, Austria, Germany, Belgium, and Switzerland.

RIOPY also performed several times in concert halls in China.

In February 2023, RIOPY embarked on his first UK tour. He performed in London, Manchester, Edinburgh, Canterbury, and other cities. Following those concerts he toured Europe with performances in France, Switzerland, Luxembourg, Sweden, and Germany.

In June 2023, the pianist-composer embarked on a U.S. tour, with concerts in New York (Le Poisson Rouge), Los Angeles (Teregram Ballroom), Boston (City Winery), Chicago (Old Town School of Folk Music), and Alexandria, Virginia (Birchmere).

On 9 July 2023 he performed at the British Summer Time festival in Hyde Park, London with Lana Del Rey headlining.

On 18 November 2023 he performed at the London Jazz Festival at Queen Elizabeth Hall, followed by a tour of cities in France including Paris and Vichy and a performance at the Cirque Royal in Brussels.

In February 2026 he launched his Be Love album with an immersive event at Othership in Brooklyn with sauna, ice bath, music and a Q&A. His touring schedule for spring and summer 2026 includes concerts in New York, Los Angeles, Paris, and Hamburg, and supporting Tom Odell at the Festival de Nîmes.

=== Featured movies and trailers ===
More recently, he has worked on movie trailers for Mr Turner, Jimmy's Hall, The Sense of an Ending, A Royal Night Out, Long Walk Home. He also composed the trailer for Oscar-winning films such as The Danish Girl (film) and The Shape Of Water.

His piano works have been included in documentaries broadcast on the BBC, ITV and Channel 4 as well. He notably composed the original soundtracks for On The Bridge and She Wants Soul. He was invited by Richard Branson to take part to his documentary The Kodiak Queen released in 2018 for the preservation of the seabed and the British Virgin Islands.

=== Solo albums ===
In 2017, RIOPY signed to Warner Classics with which he has been working ever since. One year later, he released his first Album, “RIOPY”. “I Love You” and “Drive” were among the most popular tracks of his album, including in China.

RIOPY's first album was followed in 2019 by a second one, The Tree of Light. Seen as a force for positive change in the world by its composer, he comments: "It is a call to humanity to fight – not the wars outside, but to fight the wars inside us. A wake up call. If we are all kind to each other, and kind and compassionate and nice to ourselves and each other, we will have a better chance to save ourselves and the planet." The album was the fifth best-selling New Age Album of 2021 in the US as well as the third best-selling classical album of 2022 in the US. In June 2023, 'Ukiyo' receives the Gold certification by the Recording Industry Association of America (RIAA) with more than 500,000 copies sold.

During the pandemic, he wrote his third album. Bliss, a work of eleven tracks, was released in late 2021.

In April 2023, RIOPY released his fourth album, Thrive, through Warner Classics. For this album, RIOPY took inspiration from famous classical music composers such as Satie, Pachelbel, Beethoven, Fauré, Debussy and Chopin, adapting their melodies into scores of his own.

His fifth album, Be Love, was released on January 16, 2026 on Warner Classics. Along with instrumental tracks, it includes his first-ever tracks with vocals. The single "Long Way Home," the first released vocal track of his career, preceded the album release in October 2025. RIOPY wrote the album during a period of illness and recovery, having discovered that vocalizing "became a tool for recovery."

=== Collaborations ===
After listening to RIOPY's work, the American singer-songwriter Lana Del Rey contacted the composer-pianist's manager in order to use it for her new album to be released. In March 2023, she released her album Did You Know That There's a Tunnel Under Ocean Blvd containing ‘Grandfather please stand on the shoulders of my father while he’s deep-sea fishing’, using ‘Flo’ from RIOPY's Album 'Tree of Light'. Subsequent to their collaboration, RIOPY supported Lana Del Rey's performance at BST Hyde Park in July 2023.

In conjunction with the release in early 2023 of his album Thrive, RIOPY became an official ambassador for Restore the Music UK, a charitable organisation that helps fund music education in schools in lower-income areas. In November 2022, RIOPY have a masterclass to Restore The Music UK students at Harris Academy Greenwich in London. Subsequently Restore The Music UK and RIOPY's tour promoter partnered to offer free concert tickets to students and teachers who benefit from the charity’s work.

=== Composition for advertisements ===
Since his debut, RIOPY has composed music for labels such as Air-Edel, EMI and Warner/Chappell Music, while his works have been featured in advertising campaigns by Hulu, Bentley, Samsung, Mercedes, and Giorgio Armani amongst others. In 2016, he composed the music for an award-winning IKEA ad. The music supervisor behind the Swedish IKEA commercial stated: "'Every Other Week' has become a bit of a commercial classic, referred to as one of the best commercials made in recent years, which RIOPY was a part of." In 2018, he wrote the music for a Peugeot 508 ad broadcast in France, where he is depicted driving the car himself while writing the score on screen. Following the campaign’s success, Warner Music released to the public the original track “Le Rêve d’une Note” in partnership with Peugeot.

=== Charting and streaming success ===
As of October 2024, RIOPY's music has been streamed globally over 1 billion times.

RIOPY's second album The Tree of Light ranked No. 8 on the year-end 2021 Classical Albums chart and fifth on the New Age Albums chart. In January 2022 the album peaked at No. 1 on the Classical Albums chart. As of June 2023 it had remained on that chart for more than 135 weeks.

Thrive debuted at No. 2 on the Billboard New Age Albums chart, No. 5 on the Classical Albums chart, and No. 11 on the Classical Crossover chart.

In June 2023, his 2019 track “Ukiyo” was certified gold by the RIAA with more than 500,000 copies sold.

== Meditation and wellness career ==
Over the years, RIOPY developed a keen interest in meditation and ways to improve mental health. After experiencing deep anxiety and depression, he found a new passion for neuroscience, specifically how brainwaves work to improve one's wellbeing. For example, he researched the positive effects music can have on mental health by observing the results of EKGs of his own brain waves as he listened to music. He also, at fans' suggestions, tuned his piano to 432 Hertz (as opposed to the usual 440 Hertz), a frequency believed to help brain waves to relax.

RIOPY uses various compositional techniques in pursuit of his goal to create immersive meditation music that can improve mental health and wellbeing, including using binaural beats, spatial audio and other techniques.

He partnered with Peloton to create a yoga program called "Slow Flow," released in 2021. His music is featured on the Calm app and the Sleep app. A number of his pieces are called "Meditations," such as "Meditation 22," "MED66," "Meditation 111."

In 2023 the Mental Health Foundation commissioned him to create a piece to help people manage anxiety, resulting in "Meditation 111" (named for the NHS' 111 helpline). Announcing that release, RIOPY said, "As someone who has struggled with poor mental health for most of my life, music has been a great source of solace and calm. It is not an exaggeration to say that the piano saved my life." His EP "Meditation 333," released in May 2024, consisted of three tracks of music and audio tools "designed for healing and peace."

=== TUNE YOUR MIND ^{[by RIOPY]} ===
Building on his meditation and wellness activities, RIOPY created a separate brand called TUNE YOUR MIND ^{[by RIOPY]} devoted to binaural beats, drone sounds, and neuroscience-led meditations. In 2025 Warner Classics released meditation recordings from the series: Meditation 66 (music/drone, general release) and Meditation 66 (Complete Guided Meditations) (exclusive to Amazon Music and mixed for Alexa devices specifically), as well as Sleep Meditations (general release) and Home Sleep Meditations (Amazon Music exclusive) with each of four tracks composed to induce each stage of sleep.

==== TUNE YOUR MIND podcast ====
In September 2025 RIOPY launched The Riopy Podcast – Tune Your Mind, in which he speaks with guests "about creativity, resilience, mental health [and] using music as a tool for healing." RIOPY talks with experts in meditation, neuroscience, spirituality and related fields, discusses his own life and music, and plays some of his new music.

== Discography ==
Studio Album Discography
Year	Album	Release	Record label
2018	RIOPY	Studio album	Warner Classics
2019	Tree of Light	Studio album	Warner Classics
2021	Bliss	Studio album	Warner Classics
2022	[extended] Bliss	Studio album	Warner Classics
2023	Thrive	Studio album	Warner Classics
2026	Be Love	Studio album	Warner Classics

Further releases
Year	Album	Theme	Release	Record label
2013	Portraits in Film	Soundtrack	Album	
2016	Breathe	Music	Album	
2019	Meditation	Meditation	Single	Warner Classics
2019	Le Rêve d'une note	Music	EP	Warner Classics
2020	Meditation 432	Meditation, Nature Sounds	Album	Warner Classics
2023	On a Starry Christmas Night	Christmas	EP	Warner Classics
2024	Meditation 333	Meditation	EP	Warner Classics
2024	Jingle Bells Reimagined	Christmas	EP	Warner Classics
2024	Winter Impressions	Christmas	Studio album	Warner Classics
2025	My Way of Light	Soundtrack	Single	Warner Classics
2025	Meditation 66: Complete Guided Meditations	Meditation	Album	Warner Classics
2025	Sleep Meditations	Meditation	EP	Warner Classics

Film trailers featuring RIOPY's music
Year	Title	Track(s)
2012	Long Walk Home	
2013	Mr Turner	"Help Us Grow"
2014	Jimmy's Hall	"Brave Heart"
2016	The Danish Girl	"Fairy Tale," "Feel the Air," "Embrasse-moi"
2016	A Royal Night Out	"Let It Begin"
2016	The Sense of an Ending	"Mur de Pierre," "Puissance d'Antan"
2017	Murder on the Orient Express	"The Uprising"
2018	The Happy Prince	"Becoming Stronger," "Trust in You"
2018	The Shape of Water	"32 Sides"
2018	The Mercy	"Trust in You"
2018	The Children Act	"Epic"
2018	Stan & Ollie	"Just Wait"
2018	Skam Series	"I Love You"

Documentaries and feature films featuring RIOPY's music
Year	Title
2011	She Wants Soul
2013	On the Bridge
2018	The Kodiak Queen
2024	My Way

Marketing and advertising campaigns
Year	Brand/Project	Composition/Campaign
2009	Mercedes	"Evolving Memories"
2013	Samsung	"Evolving Memories"
2014	Vertu for Bentley	"La Vie"
2015	Armani	"Braveheart"
2016	IKEA	"London 15"
2016	Steinway & Sons	"Golden Gate"
2017	TNT	"12 Sides"
2018	Peugeot	"Le Rêve d'une Note"
2024	Poste Italiane	"Drive"
