= A&W (song) =

2023 single by Lana Del Rey

Single by Lana Del Rey

from the album Did You Know That There's a Tunnel Under Ocean Blvd
- Released: February 14, 2023
- Genre: Folk; synth-pop; trap; boom bap; psychedelia
- Length: 7:13 (album version); 4:36 (radio edit); 2:22 (BBC Radio edit)
- Label: Interscope; Polydor
- Songwriters: Lana Del Rey; Jack Antonoff; Sam Dew
- Producers: Lana Del Rey; Jack Antonoff

Lana Del Rey singles chronology
| "Did You Know That There's a Tunnel Under Ocean Blvd" (2022) | "A&W" (2023) | "The Grants" (2023) |

Audio video
- "A&W" on YouTube

"A&W" is a song recorded by American singer-songwriter, and record producer Lana Del Rey for her ninth studio album, Did You Know That There's a Tunnel Under Ocean Blvd (2023). The track was written and produced by Del Rey and Jack Antonoff, along with its co-writer Sam Dew. Released on February 14, 2023, as the album's second single, the song's title not only references the American root beer brand of the same name, but serves as an initialism for "American Whore". The beat and tone shifts midway through for a brief instrumental, before shifting again into the second part, unofficially dubbed "Jimmy" by fans and critics based on the lyrics. The song is described as a psychodrama and deep exploration of women's bodies, sexual assault, slut shaming, and a critique of rape culture.

It is the third song by Del Rey that mentions soda in the title—the previous two being "Cola" (2012) and "Diet Mountain Dew" (2012). She, however, has made references to soda on songs like "Bartender" (2019). "A&W" garnered unanimous critical acclaim, immediately cited as a masterpiece and one of Del Rey's best. The song received two nominations at the 66th Annual Grammy Awards in the Song of the Year and Best Alternative Music Performance categories. It was named the best song of 2023 by several publications, including Pitchfork, The Guardian, and NME. In 2023, it was included in Rolling Stone's 500 Greatest Songs of All Time list, becoming the most recent song to appear on the listicle, and in 2024, Pitchfork named it the best song of the 2020s so far.

== Composition ==
"A&W" was written and produced by Del Rey alongside Jack Antonoff, with additional songwriting courtesy of Sam Dew. Described as a folk, pop, synth-pop, trap, boom bap and psychedelic ballad, the song is composed of two halves, which lasts a total runtime of seven minutes and thirteen seconds in the album version and a scant two minutes and twenty-two seconds in the radio edit. The first half is folk-oriented, prominently featuring acoustic guitar with intertwined supporting piano and electric guitar lines. The unusual harmony established by the piano and guitar have garnered "A&W" comparisons to the work of Nirvana. The work shifts in and out of a mixolydian flat 6 mode, notably also employed in songs like "Single Ladies (Put a Ring on It)" by Beyoncé, which is used in "A&W" to transition keys between the sections.

The second half ("Jimmy") is trap-oriented, which Rolling Stone noted for "harkening back to some of her early hip-hop-inspired productions." The second melody takes on an experimental beat, incorporating interwoven Moog bass, synth pads, 808s, Mellotron strings, and other assorted elements employed by producer Antonoff. The song contains a reference to Down Down Baby, a nursery rhyme that has been used in various songs and media productions since the mid 20th century, including the 1959 R&B song "Shimmy, Shimmy, Ko-Ko-Bop" by Little Anthony and the Imperials. The second half also notably samples her song "Norman Fucking Rockwell", similar to how an early demo of "Venice Bitch" is sampled later on Did You Know That There's a Tunnel Under Ocean Blvd during the track "Taco Truck x VB". Del Rey's vocals in the second part have been referred to as rap and follow the C mixolydian mode, all while her voice is distorted by time and pitch manipulation to cause purposeful artifacting.

"A&W" drew further comparisons to the "Lizzy Grant era" of Del Rey's career, referring to the singer's early recordings, such as the 2006 demo album Sirens, which featured a signature girly, youthful timbre.

Antonoff revealed in his 2023 Mix with the Masters session that "A&W" was recorded in just two days and that the "Jimmy" section of the song was an outtake from Norman Fucking Rockwell!'s "club" concept, recorded in 2018. On March 28, 2023, four days after the release of the song's parent album, a demo recorded during Del Rey's Ultraviolence sessions titled "Earthquakes" leaked online. The song features the same interpolated lyrics as "A&W", and is believed to be another possible precursor to the song.

== Release ==
The song was released on Valentine's Day, February 14, 2023, as the album's second single. In an Instagram post announcing the album's title and release date, Antonoff teased the track, calling it his "favorite we've ever done."

== Critical reception ==
"A&W" received universal acclaim from critics for its lyrics and experimental production. Shaad D'Souza of Pitchfork named the song "Best New Track," lauding it as a "psychedelic, collagist freakout." Jon Blistein of Rolling Stone called it "classic Lana in every way imaginable," intertwining themes of "bad love" with "Americana symbolism." Brittany Spanos of Rolling Stone similarly commented on the track as a "near-Lynchian" freakout which "escalates into a sexy, psychedelic, trap outro", ultimately naming it among the singer's best works. Ken Partridge of Genius described the song as a "complex character study," noting the lyrical references to other media, and the verse critiquing rape culture. Tomasz Lesniara of Paste ranked "A&W" as Del Rey's greatest song of all-time and highlighted the lyrics to be one of her best works. Writing for The Guardian, Laura Snapes named it the song of the year, and called it "an incredible slither of detuned guitar, brooding piano and staticky detritus... it makes no sense and it’s oddly brilliant." Billboard described "A&W" as one of the most daring entries in Del Rey's discography — a two-part track delving into sex, drugs, and Americana while confronting the marginalization of young women. The outlet highlighted the song's shift from a haunting acoustic intro to a stark electronic second half, calling it a transformation that turns an ambitious concept into one of her finest works.

=== Year-end lists ===
Select year-end rankings of "A&W"
| Publication | List | Rank | Ref. |
|---|---|---|---|
| BBC | The Best Songs of 2023 | 1 | |
| The Guardian | The 20 Best Songs of 2023 | 1 | |
| NME | The 50 Best Songs of 2023 | 1 | |
| Pitchfork | The 100 Best Songs of 2023 | 1 | |
| Slant | The 50 Best Songs of 2023 | 2 | |
| Exclaim! | The 25 Best Songs of 2023 | 3 | |
| The New York Times | Best Songs of 2023 | 3 | |
| Rolling Stone | The 100 Best Songs of 2023 | 3 | |
| The Washington Post | The best singles of 2023 | 6 | |
| British GQ | The best songs of 2023 | unranked | |

=== Decade-end lists ===
Select year-end rankings of "A&W"
| Publication | List | Rank | Ref. |
|---|---|---|---|
| Pitchfork | The 100 Best Songs of the 2020s So Far | 1 | |

Music aggregator site Album of the Year places "A&W" as the most critically acclaimed song of 2023, based on a critical consensus of year-end lists by 26 different publications. In 2024, Rolling Stone ranked the song 456th on its list of the 500 greatest songs of all time.

== Commercial performance ==
"A&W" debuted at number 129 on the Billboard Global 200 chart. In the United Kingdom, "A&W" peaked at number 41 on the UK Singles Chart. In Canada, it debuted at number 84 on the Canadian Hot 100 chart. In the United States, it debuted at number five on the Billboard Bubbling Under Hot 100 chart, and did not enter the Hot 100. "A&W" peaked at number 10 on the US Hot Rock & Alternative Songs.

== Personnel ==
- Lana Del Rey – songwriting, production, vocals, background vocals, glockenspiel
- Jack Antonoff – songwriting, production, mixing, recording, 12-string acoustic guitar, acoustic guitar, bells, drums, Mellotron, Moog bass, piano, synth bass, synth pads
- Sam Dew – songwriting, background vocals
- Ruairi O'Flaherty – mastering
- Laura Sisk – mixing, recording
- Daniel Cayotte – engineering assistance
- Jon Sher – engineering assistance
- Megan Searl – engineering assistance
- Rémy Dumelz – engineering assistance

== Charts ==
Weekly chart performance for "A&W"
| Chart (2023) | Peak position |
|---|---|
| Canada Hot 100 (Billboard) | 84 |
| Global 200 (Billboard) | 129 |
| Greece International (IFPI) | 19 |
| Hungary (Single Top 40) | 39 |
| Ireland (IRMA) | 37 |
| Lithuania (AGATA) | 27 |
| Netherlands (Single Tip) | 26 |
| New Zealand Hot Singles (RMNZ) | 16 |
| Poland (Polish Streaming Top 100) | 91 |
| Portugal (AFP) | 160 |
| Slovakia Singles Digital (ČNS IFPI) | 93 |
| Sweden Heatseeker (Sverigetopplistan) | 6 |
| UK Singles (Official Charts) | 41 |
| US Bubbling Under Hot 100 (Billboard) | 5 |
| US Hot Rock & Alternative Songs (Billboard) | 10 |

== Certifications ==
| Region | Certification | Certified units/sales |
|---|---|---|
| Brazil (Pro-Música Brasil) | Platinum | 40,000^{‡} |
^{‡} Sales+streaming figures based on certification alone.
