= Candy Necklace =

2023 single by Lana Del Rey featuring Jon Batiste

- Picture disc single cover

Single by Lana Del Rey featuring Jon Batiste

from the album Did You Know That There's a Tunnel Under Ocean Blvd
- B-side: "Jon Batiste Interlude"
- Released: October 6, 2023
- Recorded: 2022
- Genre: Alternative pop
- Length: 5:14
- Label: Interscope; Polydor
- Songwriters: Lana Del Rey; Jon Batiste
- Producers: Lana Del Rey; Zach Dawes; Nick Waterhouse; Ian Doerr

Lana Del Rey singles chronology
"Say Yes to Heaven" (2023)	"Candy Necklace" (2023)	"Tough" (2024)

Jon Batiste singles chronology
"Drink Water" (2023)	"Candy Necklace" (2023)

Music video
- "Candy Necklace" on YouTube

"Candy Necklace" is a song by American singer and songwriter Lana Del Rey featuring American singer and songwriter Jon Batiste from her ninth studio album, Did You Know That There's a Tunnel Under Ocean Blvd (2023). It was released as a limited-edition picture disc on October 6, 2023. On November 10, 2023, the song was nominated for Best Pop Duo/Group Performance for the 66th Annual Grammy Awards.

The accompanying music video was directed by Rich Lee, and was nominated at the Art Directors Guild Awards and won the MTV Video Music Award for Best Alternative Video.

== Release and reception ==
On August 23, 2022, Lana Del Rey posted a snippet of the song onto her Instagram account. The song was officially released on streaming platforms on March 24, 2023, along with a visualizer on YouTube teasing the then upcoming music video.

Robin Murray of Clash felt the track "meanders through some familiar Lana themes, depicting Gatsby esque visions of high society." Noah Ciubotaru of Exclaim! described "Candy Necklace" as "a song suffused with lust and imagery of tainted innocence". While reviewing every track from the record, Billboard opined it "doesn't resonate quite as strongly following the blistering first quarter of the album, although it's worth sticking around for the swirling outro, where Jon Batiste's murmur joins Del Rey's own."

== Music video ==
The official music video, directed by Rich Lee, has a duration of eleven minutes and was shot in Los Angeles. At the end of the video, Del Rey explains the meaning of the visual: "Why it was all supposed to be behind the scenes was because all these women who, like, changed their name, changed their hair, like me and stuff. It’s like they all fell into these different snakeholes. So the whole point is like, how do you learn from that and not fall into your own thing?".

== Awards and nominations ==
Awards and nominations for "Candy Necklace"
Ceremony	Year	Award	Result	Ref.
MTV Video Music Awards	2023	Best Alternative Video	Won	
MTV Video Music Awards	2023	Best Art Direction	Nominated	
Grammy Awards	2024	Best Pop Duo/Group Performance	Nominated	
Art Directors Guild	2024	Short Format & Music Videos	Nominated	

== Charts ==
Chart performance for "Candy Necklace"
Chart (2023)	Peak position
Ireland (IRMA)	75
New Zealand Hot Singles (RMNZ)	8
UK Singles (OCC)	68
US Hot Rock & Alternative Songs (Billboard)	22

== Certifications ==
Certifications for "Candy Necklace"
Region	Certification	Certified units/sales
Brazil (Pro-Música Brasil)	Gold	20,000^{‡}
^{‡} Sales+streaming figures based on certification alone.

== Release history ==
Release dates and formats for "Candy Necklace"
Region	Date	Format	Label	Ref.
Various	March 24, 2023	Digital download; streaming	Interscope; Polydor	
Various	October 6, 2023	7-inch single	Interscope; Polydor	
