= Say Yes to Heaven =

- Digital cover art

Single by Lana Del Rey
- B-side: "Black Beauty"
- Written: 2012
- Released: May 19, 2023
- Recorded: November 2013
- Genre: Ambient; downbeat
- Length: 3:29
- Label: Interscope; Polydor
- Songwriters: Lana Del Rey; Rick Nowels
- Producer: Rick Nowels

Lana Del Rey singles chronology
"The Grants" (2023)	"Say Yes to Heaven" (2023)	"Candy Necklace" (2023)

Audio video
- "Say Yes to Heaven" on YouTube

"Say Yes to Heaven" (also known as "Yes to Heaven") is a song by the American singer-songwriter Lana Del Rey. She wrote the track with its producer Rick Nowels in 2012 for her third studio album, Ultraviolence (2014), and reproduced it for Honeymoon (2015) and Lust for Life (2017), but was ultimately cut from all three albums. After leaking online and becoming viral on TikTok, "Say Yes to Heaven" was released as a single without prior promotion on May 19, 2023.

"Say Yes to Heaven" is an ambient and downbeat ballad about a narrator's attempt to escape with her lover. Critics praised it for the production and lyrics. The song peaked at number 54 on the US Billboard Hot 100 and received a gold certification from the Recording Industry Association of America (RIAA). It peaked at number 18 on the Billboard Global 200 and entered the top 10 and received certifications in several countries.

== Background and release ==
Lana Del Rey's third studio album, Ultraviolence, was released in 2014. It featured a number of collaborators, including Rick Nowels, who previously worked with her on the songs "Summertime Sadness" (2012) and "Dark Paradise" (2013). He was the first person to collaborate with Del Rey on Ultraviolence and co-wrote the tracks "West Coast" and "Shades of Cool" with her. Following its release, the album debuted at number one on the US Billboard 200, where it became Del Rey's first chart-topper.

Del Rey wrote "Say Yes to Heaven" with Nowels in 2012. It was recorded in November 2013 during the sessions of Ultraviolence, but did not make the final track-list. The song began to spread in around 2016. In October 2020, "Say Yes to Heaven", also known as "Yes to Heaven", was fully leaked onto the internet and went viral during the next two years; 2022 in particular saw the rise of a sped-up snippet of the song in TikTok. In March 2023, the song was claimed for copyright by UMG and Polydor Records, sparking speculation that an official release was imminent. Polydor and Interscope Records surprise-released the song as a single on May 19, 2023, with a sped-up version as its B-side. Interscope sent the song to US adult alternative radio on June 5, 2023, followed by alternative radio on June 6.

== Composition ==
"Say Yes to Heaven" runs for three minutes and twenty-nine seconds. Nowels produced the song, and played electric guitar and Hammond organ. Other musicians include Patrick Warren (guitar, marimba, strings), Tim Pierce (electric guitar), and Brian Griffin (percussion). Dean Reid and Roy English provided drum programming for the song, which was engineered by Kieron Menzies, John Christopher Fee, Trevor Yasuda, and Rocci. It was mixed by Reid and mastered by Ruairi O'Flaherty.

"Say Yes to Heaven" is an ambient and downbeat ballad about a narrator encouraging her lover to run away with her. The acoustic production incorporates muted drums, tambourine, and reverbed, finger-picked guitar arpeggios. Del Rey's vocals throughout the song are laid back but sharp according to critic Ted Davis of American Songwriter. The lyrics feature romantic imagery and motifs that were previously used in Del Rey's other songs, such as red dress, heaven and dancing. Jo Vito of Consequence and Jonathan Cohen from Spin found "Say Yes to Heaven" to be distinct from the leaked version but thought the song maintains its overall tone.

"Say Yes to Heaven" opens with gentle acoustic guitar strumming and electronic chords, with the narrator's submission to her lover: ("If you dance, I'll dance / And if you don't, I'll dance anyway / Give peace a chance / let the fear you have fall away"). In the chorus, Del Rey sings in a more breathy voice as she describes the narrator's plead to her lover: ("I've got my eye on you / Say yes to heaven / Say yes to me"). Towards the end, the narrator's yearning comes out as more resolute than desperate to her lover: ("If you dance, I'll dance / I'll put my red dress on, get it on").

== Reception ==
"Say Yes to Heaven" received positive reviews from music journalists, who described it as "dreamy", "heavenly", and "melancholy". Davis praised Del Rey's "playful" vocals and her songwriting for capturing a sense of "stoic, timeless, and implicitly flawed yearning" in the song. Vito commended Del Rey's "signature, poetic ambiguity" and the sonic pallette that "[she became] so good at crafting". Nylon's Sophia June called the song a "simple gut-punch about submission and yearning" and Alternative Press's Sadie Bell called the song a "sweet, lovelorn ballad".

On singles charts, "Say Yes to Heaven" debuted on both the United States's Billboard Hot 100 and Hot Rock & Alternative Songs, with peaks of number 54 and number four respectively. It received a gold certification from the Recording Industry Association of America (RIAA), which denotes 500,000 track-equivalent units based on sales and on-demand streaming. The song was her best-performing single on the UK Singles Chart in years; it reached number nine, and marked Del Rey's sixth top-ten career entry and her first as a soloist since "Born to Die" (2011). It received a platinum certification from the British Phonographic Industry (BPI) for selling over 600,000 units. Elsewhere, "Say Yes to Heaven" peaked within the top ten in Ireland (8), Poland (9), and New Zealand (10). The song reached number 18 on the Billboard Global 200. It also received double platinum certifications from Poland, and gold from Greece.

== Track listing ==
Digital download and streaming

1. "Say Yes to Heaven" – 3:29
2. "Say Yes to Heaven" (sped up) – 2:37

7" vinyl

Side A

1. "Say Yes to Heaven" – 3:29

Side B

1. "Black Beauty" – 5:14

== Personnel ==
Credits are adapted from Tidal.

- Lana Del Rey – songwriting, vocals
- Rick Nowels – songwriting, production, electric guitar, Hammond organ
- Patrick Warren – guitar, marimba, strings
- Dean Reid – drum programming, mixing
- Kieron Menzies – engineering
- John Christopher Fee – engineering
- Trevor Yasuda – engineering
- Rocci – engineering
- Tim Pierce – electric guitar
- Brian Griffin – percussion
- Roy English – drum programming
- Ruairi O'Flaherty – mastering

== Charts ==
=== Weekly charts ===
Weekly chart performance for "Say Yes to Heaven"
Chart (2023)	Peak position
Australia (ARIA)	20
Austria (Ö3 Austria Top 40)	36
Canada Hot 100 (Billboard)	34
Czech Republic Singles Digital (ČNS IFPI)	19
France (SNEP)	90
Germany (GfK)	41
Global 200 (Billboard)	18
Greece International (IFPI)	3
Hungary (Single Top 40)	15
Hungary (Stream Top 40)	32
Ireland (IRMA)	8
Latvia Streaming (LAIPA)	19
Lithuania (AGATA)	21
Lebanon (Lebanese Top 20)	17
Luxembourg (Billboard)	25
Middle East and North Africa (IFPI)	13
Netherlands (Single Top 100)	64
New Zealand (Recorded Music NZ)	10
Norway (VG-lista)	25
Poland (Polish Streaming Top 100)	9
Portugal (AFP)	68
Singapore (RIAS)	23
Slovakia Singles Digital (ČNS IFPI)	25
South Korea BGM (Circle)	75
Sweden (Sverigetopplistan)	28
Switzerland (Schweizer Hitparade)	18
UK Singles (Official Charts)	9
US Billboard Hot 100	54
US Hot Rock & Alternative Songs (Billboard)	4
US Rock & Alternative Airplay (Billboard)	9
Vietnam (Vietnam Hot 100)	21

=== Year-end charts ===
Year-end chart performance for "Say Yes to Heaven"
Chart (2023)	Position
UK Vinyl Singles (OCC)	7
US Hot Rock & Alternative Songs (Billboard)	20
US Rock Airplay (Billboard)	42

== Certifications ==
Certifications for "Say Yes to Heaven"
Region	Certification	Certified units/sales
Australia (ARIA)	2× Platinum	140,000^{‡}
Austria (IFPI Austria)	Platinum	30,000^{‡}
Belgium (BRMA)	Gold	20,000^{‡}
Brazil (Pro-Música Brasil)	3× Platinum	120,000^{‡}
Canada (Music Canada)	Platinum	80,000^{‡}
Denmark (IFPI Danmark)	Gold	45,000^{‡}
France (SNEP)	Platinum	200,000^{‡}
Germany (BVMI)	Gold	300,000^{‡}
Italy (FIMI)	Gold	50,000^{‡}
New Zealand (RMNZ)	Platinum	30,000^{‡}
Poland (ZPAV)	2× Platinum	100,000^{‡}
Spain (Promusicae)	Gold	30,000^{‡}
United Kingdom (BPI)	Platinum	600,000^{‡}
United States (RIAA)	Gold	500,000^{‡}
Streaming
Central America (CFC)	Platinum	7,000,000^{†}
Greece (IFPI Greece)	Gold	1,000,000^{†}
^{‡} Sales+streaming figures based on certification alone.^{†} Streaming-only figures based on certification alone.

== Release history ==
Region	Date	Format	Label	Ref.
Various	May 19, 2023	Digital download; streaming	Interscope; Polydor	
United States	June 5, 2023	Adult alternative radio	Interscope	
United States	June 6, 2023	Alternative radio	Interscope	
Various	November 14, 2023	7-inch single	Interscope	
