= Did You Know That There's a Tunnel Under Ocean Blvd (song) =

2022 single by Lana Del Rey

Single by Lana Del Rey

from the album Did You Know That There's a Tunnel Under Ocean Blvd
- Released: December 7, 2022
- Studio: Electro-Vox Recording Studios (Hollywood, CA)
- Genre: Baroque pop; orchestral pop
- Length: 4:45 (album version); 4:02 (radio edit)
- Label: Interscope; Polydor
- Songwriters: Lana Del Rey; Mike Hermosa
- Producers: Lana Del Rey; Mike Hermosa; Jack Antonoff; Drew Erickson; Zach Dawes

Lana Del Rey singles chronology
| "Snow on the Beach" (2022) | "Did You Know That There's a Tunnel Under Ocean Blvd" (2022) | "A&W" (2023) |

Audio video
- "Did You Know That There's a Tunnel Under Ocean Blvd" on YouTube

"Did You Know That There's a Tunnel Under Ocean Blvd" is a song by American singer-songwriter Lana Del Rey from the 2023 studio album of the same name, her ninth album. It was released as the lead single from the album on December 7, 2022. Del Rey wrote the song with Mike Hermosa and both produced it with Jack Antonoff, Drew Erickson, and Zach Dawes.

== Background and release ==
The song was written by Del Rey and Mike Hermosa, with whom she also co-produced it, alongside Jack Antonoff, Drew Erickson, and Zach Dawes. The track is a slow dreamy ballad described as baroque orchestral pop.

In an interview with Billie Eilish for Interview, Del Rey revealed that "Did You Know That There's a Tunnel Under Ocean Blvd" was the first song written for its parent album of the same name. She also shared that the song and title were inspired by a sealed tunnel under the Jergins Trust Building in Long Beach, California, and a 1974 track by Harry Nilsson titled "Don't Forget Me". She had read that "the [tunnel's] mosaic ceilings were still perfectly preserved, but no one could get in", and was compelled to write a song inspired by Nilsson's track using her own metaphors.

There is no known connection to the tunnel under Ocean Boulevard at Sea Mist Resort in Myrtle Beach, South Carolina, built in the 1980s but no longer used as of 2022.

=== Impact ===
The Jergins Tunnel that was referenced in the song received renewed interest after the song was released. In November 2023, it was announced that the Jergins Tunnel will reopen as a speakeasy that will be part of a new Hard Rock Hotel. The project will be completed in 2027, one year prior to the 2028 Summer Olympics.

== Critical reception ==
Billboard found "Did You Know That There's a Tunnel Under Ocean Blvd" an "effective lead single", praising its sweeping grandeur, idiosyncratic lyrics, and reflections on faded American beauty. The magazine noted that Del Rey's nuanced vocal performance elevates it above other songs with similar themes, shifting expertly between resignation and yearning. Fred Thomas of AllMusic described the title track's "lovely, string-dazzled melancholy" as a striking example of the "slow, lingering torch song style the singer has been refining since the start of her career." Sam Sodomsky of Pitchfork called it a "slow, dreamy ballad filled" with "incidental moments" and found the tunnel in the title to be "less a geographic focal point than a window into the potential she sees in the most familiar scenes and well-traveled routes". Paul Attard of Slant Magazine felt the "spacey" title track "strains hard for Del Rey's poeticism, with overcooked lyrics like 'Fuck me to death, love me until I love myself' taking the wind out of its sails before it ever really gets going."

== Personnel ==
Credits are adapted from Tidal.

- Lana Del Rey – vocals, background vocals, songwriter, producer
- Mike Hermosa – producer, songwriter, acoustic guitar
- Jack Antonoff – producer, drums, electric guitar, synth bassist, programmer, mixer
- Drew Erickson – producer, conductor, string arranger, piano, synth bass
- Zach Dawes – producer
- Jim Keltner – drums
- Benji Lysaght – acoustic guitar, sound effects
- Christine Kim – cello
- Jake Braun – cello
- Logan Hone – clarinet
- Charlie Bisharat – violin
- Andrew Bulbrook – violin
- Wynton Grant – violin
- Paul J. Cartwright – violin
- Vonciele Faggett – background vocals
- Melodye Perry – background vocals
- Shikena Jones – background vocals
- Laura Sisk – engineer, mixer
- Michael Harris – engineer
- Dean Reid – engineer
- Bill Mims – assistant recording engineer
- Jon Sher – assistant recording engineer
- Mark Aguilar – assistant recording engineer
- Ben Fletcher – assistant recording engineer
- Matt Tuggle – assistant recording engineer
- Ruairi O'Flaherty – assistant recording engineer
- Brian Rajaratnam – assistant recording engineer
- Ivan Handwerk – assistant recording engineer
- Megan Searl – assistant recording engineer

== Charts ==
Chart performance for "Did You Know That There's a Tunnel Under Ocean Blvd"
| Chart (2022) | Peak position |
|---|---|
| Greece International (IFPI) | 41 |
| Ireland (IRMA) | 87 |
| Lithuania (AGATA) | 94 |
| New Zealand Hot Singles (RMNZ) | 19 |
| UK Singles (Official Charts) | 98 |
| US Hot Rock & Alternative Songs (Billboard) | 23 |

== Certifications ==
| Region | Certification | Certified units/sales |
|---|---|---|
| Brazil (Pro-Música Brasil) | Platinum | 40,000^{‡} |
^{‡} Sales+streaming figures based on certification alone.
