= The Endless Summer Tour =

2015 concert tour by Lana Del Rey

- Continental tour by Lana Del Rey
- Location: North America
- Associated album: Ultraviolence
- Start date: May 7, 2015
- End date: June 16, 2015
- No. of shows: 20
- Guests: Courtney Love; Grimes
- Box office: US $6 million ($8.15 million in 2025 dollars)

Lana Del Rey concert chronology
- Paradise Tour (2013–14); The Endless Summer Tour (2015); LA to the Moon Tour (2018)

The Endless Summer Tour was the third headlining concert tour by American recording artist Lana Del Rey in support of her third studio album, Ultraviolence (2014). The tour began on May 7, 2015, in The Woodlands, Texas and concluded on June 16, 2015, in West Palm Beach, Florida finishing with a total of twenty shows over the span of two months. The first seven shows of the tour were supported by fellow alternative rock singer Courtney Love, while the majority of the remaining tour dates were supported by synthpop singer and producer, Grimes. Most of the tour dates were sold out instantly.

Lana Del Rey performed songs from Born to Die, Paradise, and Ultraviolence, in addition to some previously unreleased songs, and covers. By the end of 2015, the tour placed at number 156 on Pollstar's "2015 Year-End Top 200 North American Tours" list, grossing $6 million from 16 shows.

== Background ==
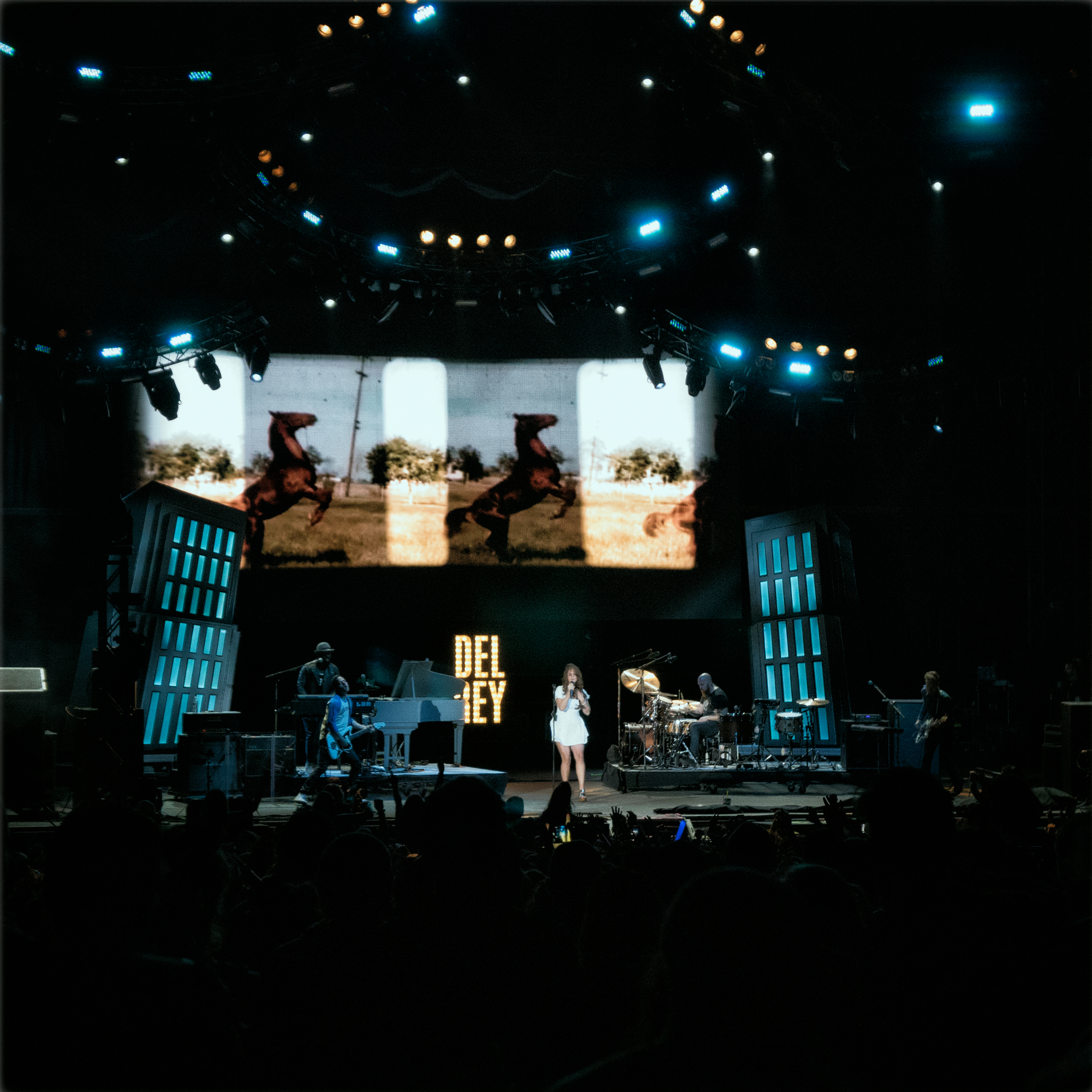
Del Rey performing at The Gorge Amphitheatre.

Prior to the release of Ultraviolence (2014), Del Rey performed a series of concerts across North America in April and May 2014. Included in this slew of concerts were two performances at the Coachella Valley Music and Arts Festival, the first in which Del Rey premiered "West Coast", the lead single off of Ultraviolence. After the release of Ultraviolence, Del Rey then went on to perform at various music festivals across Europe during June, July, and August 2014 before canceling the remainder of her promotional concerts due to health issues. After recovering from her illness, Del Rey went on to finish her promotional concert tour by performing two shows at the Hollywood Forever Cemetery in Los Angeles in October 2014. After the completion of the promotional tour, there was much speculation as to if there would be a proper concert tour in support of the singer's latest studio album.

During an interview with the Australian press in July 2014, Courtney Love, former frontwoman of the punk rock band Hole, expressed an interest in collaborating with artists such as Miley Cyrus and Lana Del Rey. When speaking of the possibility of a duet between her and Del Rey, she exclaimed that "I [Love] have a distinctive voice and it might sound cool if it's the right song". Within the following months, Love continued to hint at a collaboration between her and Del Rey publicly through her Twitter account tagging Del Rey in a tweet and stating that there was "exciting news to come".

On December 1, 2014, the tour was officially announced with seventeen shows scheduled across North America in the summer of the following year. Along with the tour's announcement came news that Love would be co-headlining the first eight shows with Del Rey to promote her upcoming solo release. Presale tickets for the tour began shortly after the tour's announcement on December 3, 2014, which was then followed by the general public sale beginning after that on December 6, 2014. Four months later, on April 1, 2015, Del Rey announced that synthpop singer and producer Grimes would be joining her on the remaining dates of the tour after Love departed from the tour.

== Set list ==
This set list is representative of the show on May 7, 2015, in The Woodlands, Texas. It does not represent all dates throughout the tour.

1. "Cruel World" (with "Sleep Walk" intro)
2. "Cola"
3. "Blue Jeans"
4. "West Coast"
5. "Us Against the World"
6. "Born to Die"
7. "Ultraviolence"
8. "Summertime Sadness"
9. "Chelsea Hotel No. 2"
10. "Brooklyn Baby"
11. "Shades of Cool"
12. "You Can Be the Boss"
13. "Serial Killer"
14. "Video Games"
15. "Why Don't You Do Right?"
16. "Off to the Races"

=== Notes ===
- Del Rey performed "Ride" instead of "Brooklyn Baby" at the June 6, 2015, show in Atlantic City, New Jersey, as well as at the last three shows of the tour from June 13 to 16, 2015.
- Per audience request at the June 14, 2015, show in Atlanta, Del Rey sang a verse of "Old Money".
- During the show on June 16, 2015, in West Palm Beach, Florida, Del Rey performed "Florida Kilos" and "Honeymoon".

== Shows ==
List of concerts showing date, city, country, venue, opening act, tickets sold, number of available tickets and amount of gross revenue
Date (2015)	City	Country	Venue	Opening act	Attendance	Revenue
May 7	The Woodlands	United States	Cynthia Woods Mitchell Pavilion	Courtney Love	—N/a	—N/a
May 12	Morrison	United States	Red Rocks Amphitheatre	Courtney Love	—N/a	—N/a
May 14	Phoenix	United States	Ak-Chin Pavilion	Courtney Love	—N/a	—N/a
May 16	Chula Vista	United States	Sleep Train Amphitheatre	Courtney Love	—N/a	—N/a
May 18	Los Angeles	United States	Hollywood Bowl	Courtney Love	—N/a	—N/a
May 20	Mountain View	United States	Shoreline Amphitheatre	Courtney Love	—N/a	—N/a
May 22	Ridgefield	United States	Amphitheater Northwest	Courtney Love	—N/a	—N/a
May 24 (Note: The show on May 24, 2015 in George, Washington was a part of the 2015 Sasquatch! Music Festival.)	George	United States	The Gorge Amphitheatre	—N/a	—N/a	—N/a
May 28	Noblesville	United States	Klipsch Music Center	Grimes	—N/a	—N/a
May 30	Tinley Park	United States	First Midwest Bank Amphitheatre	Grimes	—N/a	—N/a
May 31	Clarkston	United States	DTE Energy Music Theatre	Grimes	14,566 / 14,566	$554,080
June 3	Toronto	Canada	Molson Canadian Amphitheatre	Grimes	—N/a	—N/a
June 4	Montreal	Canada	Bell Centre	Grimes	11,329 / 11,329	$641,804
June 6	Atlantic City	United States	Borgata Event Center	Grimes	—N/a	—N/a
June 7 (Note: The show on June 7, 2015 in New York City, New York was a part of the 2015 Governors Ball Music Festival.)	New York	United States	Randall's Island Park	—N/a	—N/a	—N/a
June 9	Mansfield (Note: Promoted as Boston)	United States	Xfinity Center	Grimes	—N/a	—N/a
June 11	Bristow	United States	Jiffy Lube Live	Grimes	—N/a	—N/a
June 13	Charlotte	United States	PNC Music Pavilion	Grimes	—N/a	—N/a
June 14	Atlanta	United States	Aaron's Amphitheatre at Lakewood	Grimes	—N/a	—N/a
June 16	West Palm Beach	United States	Coral Sky Amphitheatre	Grimes	—N/a	—N/a
Total					25,895 / 25,895	+$6,000,000

=== Cancelled shows ===
List of cancelled concerts showing date, city, country, venue and reason for cancellation
Date	City	Country	Venue	Reason
May 9, 2015	Dallas	United States	Gexa Energy Pavilion	Inclement weather
