= LA to the Moon Tour =

2018 concert tour by Lana Del Rey

- Tour by Lana Del Rey
- Location: Australia; Europe; North America; South America
- Associated album: Lust for Life
- Start date: January 5, 2018
- End date: August 10, 2018
- Legs: 4
- No. of shows: 38
- Box office: US$22.5 million

Lana Del Rey concert chronology
- The Endless Summer Tour (2015); LA to the Moon Tour (2018); The Norman Fucking Rockwell! Tour (2019)

The LA to the Moon Tour was the fourth headlining concert tour by American singer Lana Del Rey, in support of her fifth studio album and fourth major-label studio album, Lust for Life (2017). The tour began on January 5, 2018, at the Target Center in Minneapolis, and visited cities across North America, South America, Oceania and Europe. Originally scheduled to end September 7, 2018, in Lehavot HaBashan, it ended early in Budapest on August 10, 2018, due to protest associated with the ongoing Israeli–Palestinian conflict.

== Background ==
Del Rey's fifth studio album, Lust for Life was officially released worldwide on July 21, 2017. During the months leading up to the album's release, fans and press speculated whether or not Del Rey would embark on a headlining concert tour in support of the album, as she did not for her previous release, Honeymoon. In an interview for Beats 1 on July 12, 2017, Zane Lowe asked Del Rey if she planned to go on a world tour and she seemed unsure, but during the following months Del Rey began to announce various one-off promotional concerts across the United Kingdom and United States. The promotional tour took place from July to October 2017, and consisted of concerts at intimate venues in London, cities in California and New York City, as well as shows at the Echo Arena Liverpool and the SSE Hydro in the United Kingdom.

On August 19, 2017, Del Rey confirmed in a video via Instagram that she would be embarking on an official world tour in support of Lust for Life, as her first official headlining concert tour since The Endless Summer Tour in 2015, which was in support of Ultraviolence. Del Rey teased many details of the tour during the following weeks, she informed fans of what continents she would be visiting and how to purchase tickets through presale.

The first dates for the LA to the Moon Tour were eventually announced on September 27, 2017, with a leg of North American dates, and on the same day Del Rey announced that she would be appearing at various South American festivals. Tickets for the North American shows became available for presale on September 29, followed by general sale on October 2. The North American leg is supported by American singer Jhené Aiko and Colombian-American singer Kali Uchis. Australian and European dates for the tour were announced on October 16, 2017.

On January 16, 2018, it was announced that American singer Børns, whom Del Rey had recently collaborated with on two tracks for his second studio album Blue Madonna, would be joining Del Rey as the opening act for the Australian leg of the tour.

== Development and stage ==
In an interview with MTV during October 2017, Del Rey stated that she was working to create a stage design for the tour that incorporates "lots of senses", and beach themed projections with "beautiful structures that move in and out of the stage to give it a classic feeling". The stage design, designed by Jason Ardizzone-West, was revealed once the tour began on January 5, 2018. The stage features an array of beach-themed props and is backed by a large screen displaying visuals designed by Storme Whitby-Grubb. Terence Cawley of The Boston Globe described the set-up as a "microcosm of [Del Rey's] beloved California" with a display of rock formations, palm trees, and beach chairs. Reed Fischer of GoMN similarly described the stage as "pure Los Angeles", suiting the title of the tour, "LA to the Moon", with "projections of crashing waves, a fast-moving highway, and a sun-drenched swimming pool danced on the stage floor throughout the night".

== Set list ==
This set list is representative of the show on January 5, 2018, in Minneapolis, Minnesota. It does not represent all dates throughout the tour.

1. "13 Beaches" (with "Experiment in Terror" intro)
2. "Pretty When You Cry"
3. "Cherry" (with "Scarborough Fair" outro)
4. "Born to Die"
5. "Blue Jeans"
6. "White Mustang"
7. "National Anthem" (with "Happy Birthday, Mr. President" intro)
8. "When the World Was at War We Kept Dancing"
9. "Music to Watch Boys To"
10. "Lust for Life"
11. "Change" / "Black Beauty" / "Young and Beautiful"
12. "Ride" (introduced with monologue from Ride short film)
13. "Video Games"
14. "Love"
15. "Ultraviolence"
16. "Summertime Sadness"
17. "Serial Killer"
18. "Off to the Races"

=== Notes ===
- During the show in Boston on January 13, 2018, "Yayo" was performed in place of "Serial Killer".
- During the shows in Hawaii and Latin America, "High By the Beach" "Florida Kilos" (Show in Bogotá, Colombia. After the crowd repeatedly asked the artist to perform it since in the song she mentions Colombians) and "West Coast" were added to the set list.
- During the Nashville show on February 6, 2018, she performed "Yayo", "Body Electric", "God bless America- and all the beautiful women in it", and "Honeymoon".
- During the show in Melbourne on March 31, 2018, Del Rey performed "High by the Beach", "Gods & Monsters", "Million Dollar Man", "West Coast" and "Shades of Cool".
- In place of certain songs, Del Rey has performed (at select venues) "Yayo", "God Bless America – and All the Beautiful Women in It", "Honeymoon", "Body Electric", "Diet Mountain Dew", "Dark Paradise", "Radio", "Get Free", "Old Money", "Cruel World", "Salvatore", "Terrence Loves You", "Paradise", "High by the Beach", "West Coast", "Gods & Monsters", "Carmen" and "Florida Kilos".
- In select venues Del Rey also performed acapella versions of "In My Feelings", "Heroin", "Art Deco", "Get Free" and "God Bless America- And All The Beautiful Women In It".

== Shows ==
List of concerts, showing date, city, country, venue, opening act, tickets sold, number of available tickets and amount of gross revenue
Date (2018)	City	Country	Venue	Opening act	Attendance	Revenue
Leg 1 – North America
January 5	Minneapolis	United States	Target Center	Jhené Aiko	—N/a	—N/a
January 7	Denver	United States	Pepsi Center	Jhené Aiko	—N/a	—N/a
January 11	Chicago	United States	United Center	Jhené Aiko	—N/a	—N/a
January 13	Boston	United States	TD Garden	Jhené Aiko	—N/a	—N/a
January 15	Toronto	Canada	Air Canada Centre	Kali Uchis	12,771 / 12,771	$1,062,700
January 17	Detroit	United States	Little Caesars Arena	Kali Uchis	—N/a	—N/a
January 19	Newark	United States	Prudential Center	Kali Uchis	10,918 / 13,001	$865,985
January 21	Philadelphia	United States	Wells Fargo Center	Kali Uchis	7,178 / 15,392	$568,702
January 23	Columbus	United States	Schottenstein Center	Kali Uchis	—N/a	—N/a
January 25	Washington, D.C.	United States	Capital One Arena	Kali Uchis	—N/a	—N/a
January 26	State College	United States	Bryce Jordan Center	Kali Uchis	—N/a	—N/a
January 30	Charlotte	United States	Spectrum Center	Kali Uchis	—N/a	—N/a
February 1	Sunrise (Note: Promoted as Ft. Lauderdale)	United States	BB&T Center	Kali Uchis	—N/a	—N/a
February 2	Orlando	United States	Amway Center	Kali Uchis	—N/a	—N/a
February 5	Atlanta	United States	Philips Arena	Kali Uchis	7,370 / 12,275	$604,500
February 6	Nashville	United States	Bridgestone Arena	Kali Uchis	9,558 / 12,529	$572,874
February 8	Dallas	United States	American Airlines Center	Kali Uchis	9,929 / 13,365	$824,168
February 10	Houston	United States	Toyota Center	Kali Uchis	9,202 / 11,143	$868,366
February 11	Austin	United States	Frank Erwin Center	—N/a	10,941 / 10,941	$807,280
February 13	Phoenix	United States	Talking Stick Resort Arena	Kali Uchis	—N/a	—N/a
February 15	San Diego	United States	Valley View Casino Center	Kali Uchis	—N/a	—N/a
February 16	Paradise (Note: Promoted as Las Vegas)	United States	Mandalay Bay Events Center	Kali Uchis	8,880 / 9,210	$794,687
February 28	Honolulu	United States	Waikiki Shell	Kali Uchis	—N/a	—N/a
Leg 2 – South America
March 17 (Note: The concerts on March 17, 18, and 25, 2018 were part of Lollapalooza.)	San Isidro (Note: Promoted as Buenos Aires)	Argentina	Hipódromo de San Isidro	—N/a	—N/a	—N/a
March 18	Santiago	Chile	Parque O'Higgins	—N/a	—N/a	—N/a
March 23 (Note: The concert on March 23, 2018, in Bogotá, Colombia at Parque Deportivo 222 is a part of Estéreo Picnic Festival.)	Bogotá	Colombia	Parque Deportivo 222	—N/a	—N/a	—N/a
March 25	São Paulo	Brazil	Autódromo de Interlagos	—N/a	300,000 / 300,000	$23,099,200
Leg 3 – Oceania
March 29	Brisbane	Australia	Riverstage	Børns	—N/a	—N/a
March 31	Melbourne	Australia	Sidney Myer Music Bowl	Børns	—N/a	—N/a
April 2	Sydney	Australia	Qudos Bank Arena	Børns	12,614 / 13,657	$1,215,120
Leg 4 – Europe
April 11	Milan	Italy	Mediolanum Forum	Cat Power	—N/a	—N/a
April 13	Rome	Italy	PalaLottomatica	Cat Power	—N/a	—N/a
April 16	Berlin	Germany	Mercedes-Benz Arena	Cat Power	—N/a	—N/a
April 17	Antwerp	Belgium	Sportpaleis	Cat Power	—N/a	—N/a
April 19	Barcelona	Spain	Palau Sant Jordi	Cat Power	—N/a	—N/a
April 20	Madrid	Spain	Palacio Vistalegre	Cat Power	—N/a	—N/a
June 29 (Note: The concert on June 29, 2018, in Panenský Týnec, Czech Republic was part of the Aerodrome Festival.)	Panenský Týnec	Czechia	Panenský Týnec Airfield	—N/a	—N/a	—N/a
August 10 (Note: The concert on August 10, 2018, in Budapest, Hungary at Hajógyári Island was part of the Sziget Festival.)	Budapest	Hungary	Hajógyári Island	—N/a	—N/a	—N/a
Total					—N/a	$22,500,000

=== Cancelled shows ===
List of cancelled concerts showing date, city, country, venue and reason for cancellation
Date (2018)	City	Country	Venue	Reason
January 9	Kansas City	United States	Sprint Center	Illness
September 7	Lehavot HaBashan	Israel	Pecan Park	BDS Movement
