= Photomaton =

Photomaton may refer to:

- The Photomaton, an early design of the Photo booth
  - Photomaton Parent Corporation Limited, a company set up by Clarence Hatry
- "Photomaton" (song), 2013 single by French electronic act Jabberwocky

== See also ==
- "Photomaton e Vox", poetry by Herberto Hélder
