= Mark Mahoney =

American tattoo artist

- Born: 1957 (age 68–69); Boston, Massachusetts, U.S.
- Occupation: Tattoo artist
- Spouse: Nicole Mahoney

Mark Mahoney (born 1957) is an American tattoo artist. He is considered as the founding father of black and grey art with a single needle.

== Biography ==
Mark Mahoney grew up in Boston, Massachusetts. After a brief stint at the School of the Museum of Fine Arts, he became a tattoo artist.

He owns and is the principal artist at the Shamrock Social Club on Sunset Boulevard in Hollywood, Los Angeles, California.

He has tattooed the celebrity clients Kelly Osbourne, Lady Gaga, David Beckham, and Brooklyn Beckham.

He took Dr. Woo as an apprentice.

== Filmography ==
=== Feature films ===
- Blood Ties (2013)
- Black Mass (2015)

=== Television ===
- Entourage, season 4 episode 5 “The Dream Team”
- Unplanned America 2014; Season 2 Episode 4 "Marked Men"
- Irish Pickers, series 1 episode 4 "Dealers"

=== Music videos ===
- Lana Del Rey - "West Coast" (2014)
- Lana Del Rey - "Shades of Cool"Aka "Lana's Man" (2014)
