= Sirens (May Jailer album) =

Demo album by May Jailer
- Released: May 31, 2012 (internet leak)
- Recorded: 2006
- Studios: Jim Cushman Studio (by Alex Frizzell)
- Genres: Folk; acoustic
- Length: 56:29

Sirens is an unreleased demo album by American singer-songwriter Lana Del Rey, under the pseudonym May Jailer. It was recorded in 2006, making it her earliest full-length album. The entire project was leaked through YouTube on May 31, 2012.

The album leaked during the Born to Die era, during which many of Del Rey's unreleased songs surfaced. It is unclear how the songs were leaked, although some claim they were stolen from a hard drive Del Rey brought to a hotel. These rumors have never been addressed by Del Rey.

== Composition ==
Composed entirely of acoustic tracks, the album is devoid of the hip hop beats, electronic tones, and experimental music found on Born to Die. Most of the album's songs have the same tempo.

== Critical reception ==
Idolator likened the Jailer album to Jewel's debut, Pieces of You. Further, Idolator said: "Though her vocals are often weak and shaky, her tone sounds delicate and sweet on all these simple tracks...[The] songs [are] written in her range, so she doesn't have to sing (and sing-talk) in her head voice and resort to that cutesy, flirty baby coo so prominent throughout Born to Die." Pop Crush reviewer Amy Sciarretto said she could imagine Del Rey singing the album's tracks in a coffeehouse. Calling the tracks themselves "folky and fragile", Further, Sciarretto compared Del Rey's voice to that of a "little bird", saying it was no wonder that songs called "Birds of a Feather" and "Aviation" appeared on the album.

== Track listing ==
All tracks are written by Elizabeth Grant.

Sirens track listing
No.	Title	Alternative title	Length
1.	"For K (Part 1)"	"Drive By"	2:44
2.	"Next to Me"	"River Road"	2:41
3.	"A Star for Nick"		2:43
4.	"My Momma"		3:25
5.	"Bad Disease"		3:42
6.	"Out with a Bang"		3:19
7.	"Dear Elliot"	"Westbound"	4:33
8.	"Try Tonight"		3:35
9.	"Peace"	"All You Need"	5:48
10.	"How Do You Know Me So Well?"	"I'm Indebted to You"	3:59
11.	"Pretty Baby"		3:39
12.	"Aviation"		3:11
13.	"Move"	"Find My Own Way"	4:13
14.	"Junky Pride"	"Junkie Pride"	2:52
15.	"Birds of a Feather"		2:46
16.	"Munny Hunny"		3:12
Total length:			56:29
