= Brooklyn Baby =

Single by Lana Del Rey

from the album Ultraviolence
- Released: June 8, 2014
- Studio: Easy Eye Sound (Nashville)
- Genre: Dream pop
- Length: 5:52
- Label: Polydor; Interscope
- Songwriters: Lana Del Rey; Barrie O'Neill
- Producer: Dan Auerbach

Lana Del Rey singles chronology
| "Ultraviolence" (2014) | "Brooklyn Baby" (2014) | "Wait for Life" (2015) |

Licensed audio
- "Brooklyn Baby" on YouTube

"Brooklyn Baby" is a song by American singer-songwriter Lana Del Rey for her third studio album, Ultraviolence (2014). It was written by Del Rey and Barrie O'Neill, while production was handled by Dan Auerbach. The dream pop song was released on June 8, 2014, by Polydor and Interscope Records. The song's lyrical content is notable for its satirical elements targeting the New York hipster subculture; its chorus highlights a cliches about hipsters, Brooklyn, millennials, and among others.

== Composition ==
Lana Del Rey and Barrie O'Neill wrote "Brooklyn Baby", while Dan Auerbach produced it. Miriam Coleman of Rolling Stone described Del Rey's vocals as "breathy" and called the melody of the song "reminiscent of 1960s girl-group hits". In the dream pop song, Del Rey pokes fun at New York City and celebrates hipster subculture, referencing several cliches about them, Brooklyn, and millennials. Del Rey said that she wrote the song with Lou Reed in mind. She was supposed to work with him and flew to New York City to meet him, but he died the day she arrived. He is referenced in the line "And my boyfriend's in a band/ He plays guitar while I sing Lou Reed".

== Critical response ==
Miriam Coleman of Rolling Stone described "Brooklyn Baby" as a "dreamy song... with a breathy vocals and a melody before moving into Del Rey's typically languid, dreamy soundscape". Duncan Cooper of The Fader stated that "Brooklyn Baby" is the standout track of Ultraviolence, pointing out the "uncharacteristically self-assured gem", "Yeah, my boyfriend's pretty cool/ But he's not as cool as me." Sharan Shetty of Slate complimented its melody, however disliked the lack of "big, chewy vocal hooks". "Brooklyn Baby" was placed at number twenty two on Rolling Stone's 50 Best Songs of 2014 list.

== Credits and personnel ==
Credits were adapted from the liner notes of Ultraviolence.

=== Locations ===
- Recorded at Easy Eye Sound (Nashville)

=== Performance credits ===
- Lana Del Rey – vocals, background vocals
- Seth Kauffman – background vocals

=== Instruments ===
- Dan Auerbach – electric guitar
- Seth Kauffman – electric guitar, percussion
- Leon Michels – mellotron, tambourine, percussion, tenor saxophone
- Nick Movshon – upright bass, drums
- Russ Pahl – pedal steel guitar, acoustic guitar
- Kenny Vaughan – acoustic guitar
- Maximilian Weissenfeldt – drums

=== Technical and production ===
- Dan Auerbach – production
- John Davis – mastering
- Collin Dupuis – engineering
- Robert Orton – mixing

== Charts ==
Chart performance
| Chart (2014) | Peak position |
|---|---|
| Australia (ARIA) | 35 |
| Austria (Ö3 Austria Top 40) | 64 |
| Belgium (Ultratop 50 Wallonia) | 32 |
| Canada Hot 100 (Billboard) | 60 |
| Finland Download (Latauslista) | 6 |
| France (SNEP) | 33 |
| Italy (FIMI) | 50 |
| Netherlands (Single Top 100) | 87 |
| New Zealand (Recorded Music NZ) | 19 |
| Russian Digital Songs (Lenta) | 10 |
| Spain (Promusicae) | 36 |
| Switzerland (Schweizer Hitparade) | 16 |
| UK Singles (Official Charts) | 86 |
| US Bubbling Under Hot 100 Singles (Billboard) | 1 |

== Certifications ==
Certifications and sales
| Region | Certification | Certified units/sales |
|---|---|---|
| Australia (ARIA) | Platinum | 70,000^{‡} |
| Austria (IFPI Austria) | Gold | 15,000^{*} |
| Brazil (Pro-Música Brasil) | 2× Platinum | 120,000^{‡} |
| Denmark (IFPI Danmark) | Gold | 45,000^{‡} |
| New Zealand (RMNZ) | Platinum | 30,000^{‡} |
| Spain (Promusicae) | Gold | 30,000^{‡} |
| United Kingdom (BPI) | Platinum | 600,000^{‡} |
| United States (RIAA) | Platinum | 1,000,000^{‡} |
^{*} Sales figures based on certification alone.^{‡} Sales+streaming figures based on certification alone.

== Release history ==
| Region | Date | Format | Label |
|---|---|---|---|
| Worldwide | June 8, 2014 | Digital download | Interscope; Polydor |
