= List of unreleased songs recorded by Lana Del Rey =

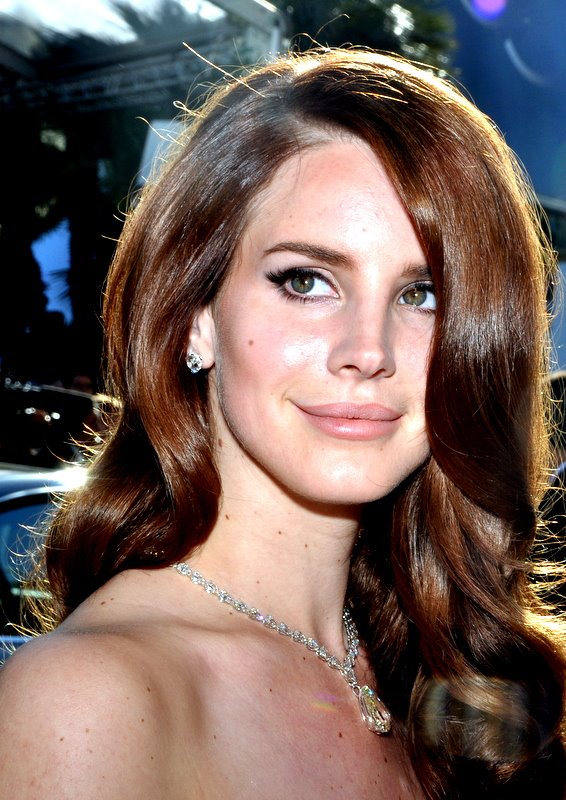
Lana Del Rey (pictured in 2012) has had over 300 songs leak online since her debut in 2011.

Since the beginning of her career in 2005, American singer and songwriter Lana Del Rey has recorded a number of demos and even finalized studio recordings under a series of pseudonyms including Lizzy Grant, Sparkle Jump Rope Queen, May Jailer, and with her former band, The Phenomena. Throughout the years, many of her tracks from these sessions have been leaked online, with Del Rey even furthering the popularity of songs including "Serial Killer" and "You Can Be the Boss" through her live performances. Del Rey has currently only published eleven previously unreleased songs on a new album, namely "Black Beauty" on Ultraviolence in 2014, "Beautiful People Beautiful Problems" on Lust for Life in 2017, "The Next Best American Record" and "California" on Norman Fucking Rockwell in 2019, "Yosemite" on Chemtrails over the Country Club and "Cherry Blossom", "Dealer", "If You Lie Down with Me", "Living Legend", "Nectar of the Gods", and "Thunder" on Blue Banisters in 2021. She released "Say Yes to Heaven" as a single, along with a sped up version in May 2023. She has also repurposed some of her unreleased songs for film and TV soundtracks, including "Young and Beautiful" for The Great Gatsby, "Life Is Beautiful" for The Age of Adaline, and "I Can Fly" for Big Eyes, while her only song to be re-recorded was "Ghetto Baby" by Cheryl Cole. "Watercolor Eyes" was an outtake from Del Rey's album Blue Banisters and was repurposed for the season 2 soundtrack of the series Euphoria.

Del Rey stated in 2017 during a show that she intends to release a collection of "25 of [her] favorite" leaked songs of hers. In a livestream in July of that same year, Del Rey said she wanted to release "TV in Black & White", "Us Against the World", "I Caught You Boy", "On Our Way", "Trash Magic", "Hollywood's Dead" and "Hollywood in me". When questioned about including her song "Kill Kill", Del Rey jokingly replied with "that's funny", and in response to including "Say Yes to Heaven", she agreed stating "that's a good one."

== Sources of information ==
- Since the mass-leaks have occurred in Del Rey's career, numerous media outlets have acknowledged the tracks as those of Del Rey, including Nylon, Billboard, BuzzFeed, Vice, Fuse, and MTV.
- Del Rey herself has performed a number of the songs live on tour, including "Serial Killer", "You Can Be the Boss", "Us Against the World", and "Paradise".
- Del Rey, a member of American Society of Composers, Authors and Publishers, or ASCAP, has registered a majority of songs named in this list in her copyrighted materials on the union's online catalogue.

== 2005–09: Early recordings and aliases ==
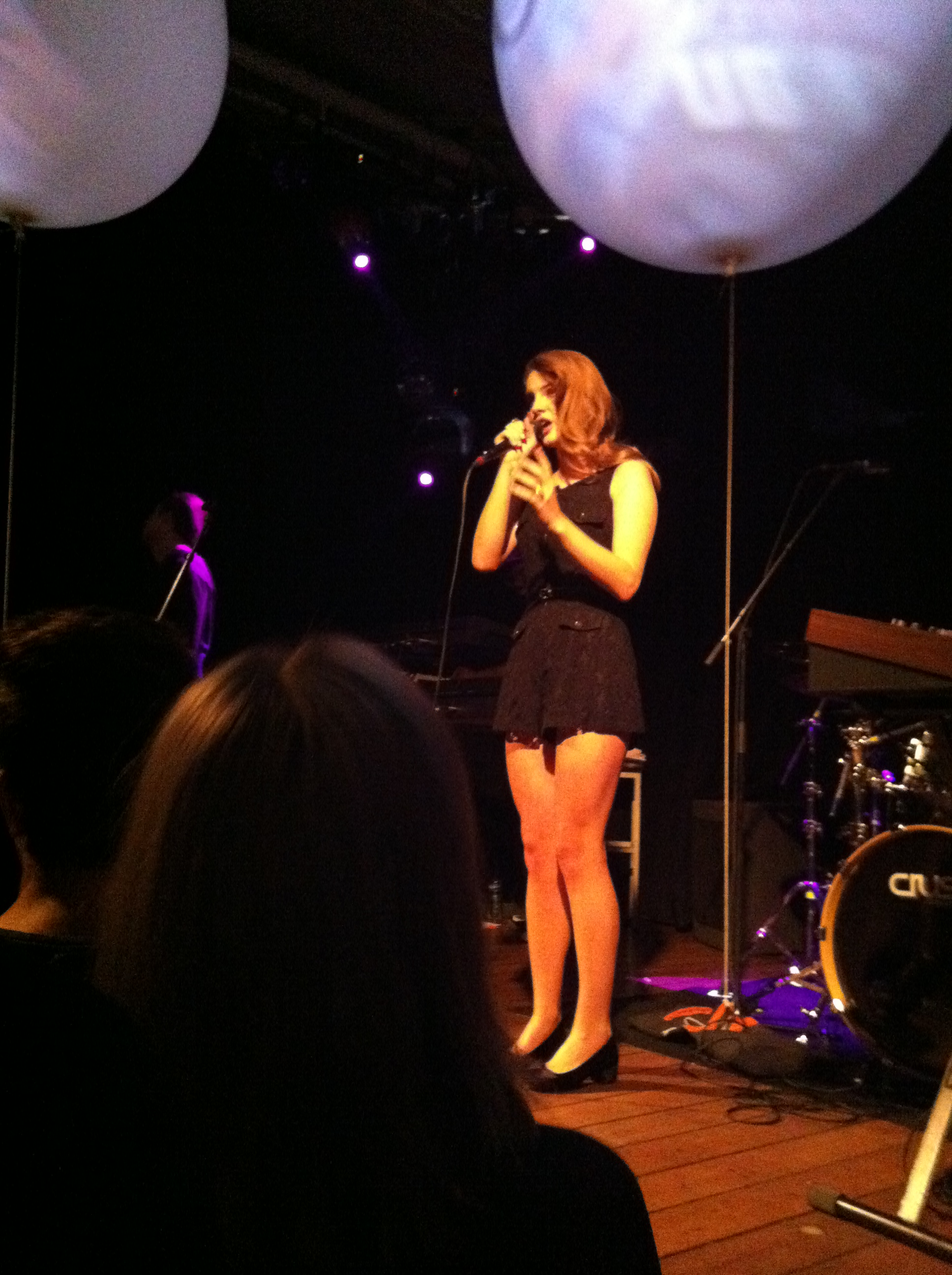
Del Rey performing at the Paradiso in Amsterdam in 2011

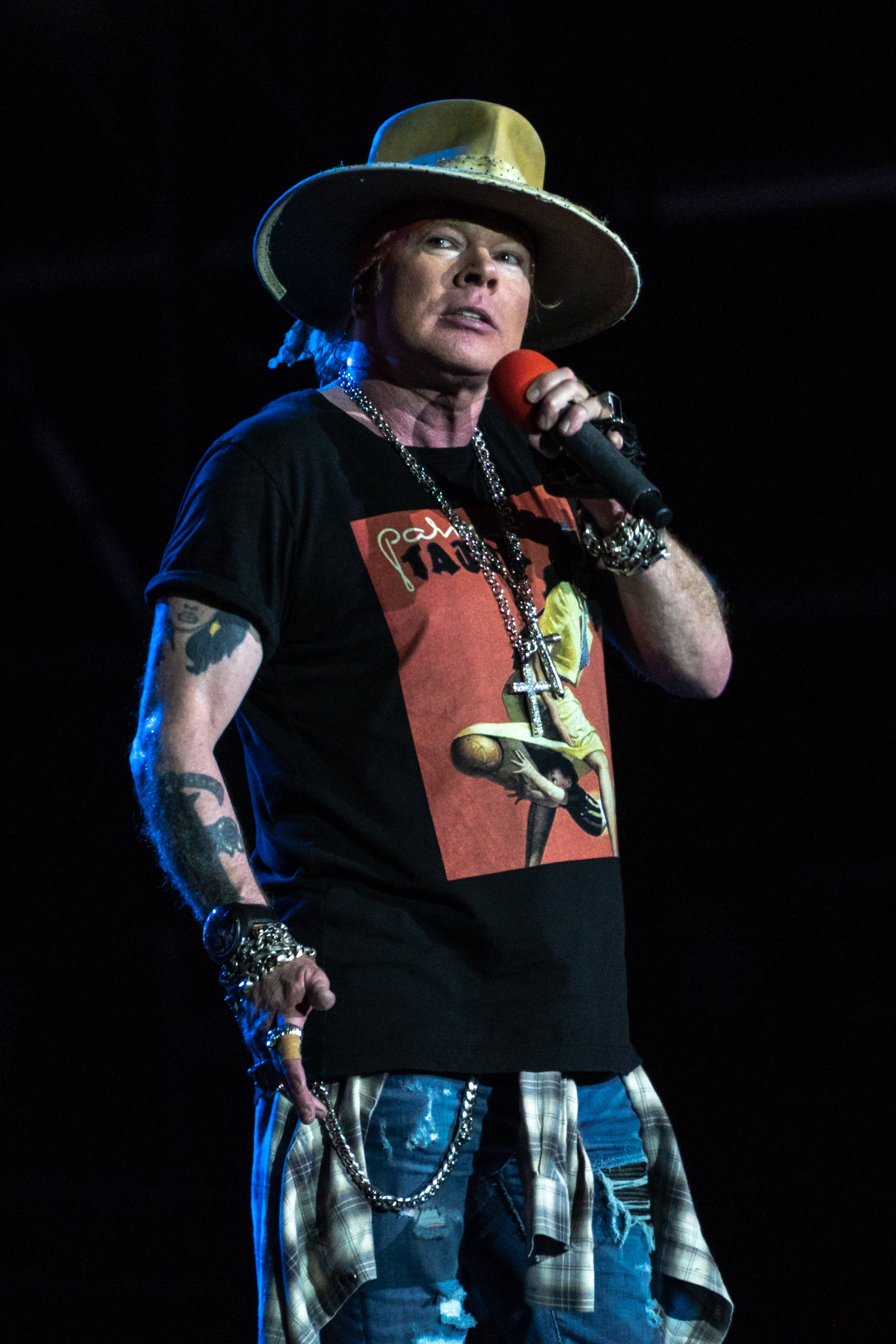
"Axl Rose Husband" was written by Del Rey about Guns N' Roses frontman, Axl Rose.

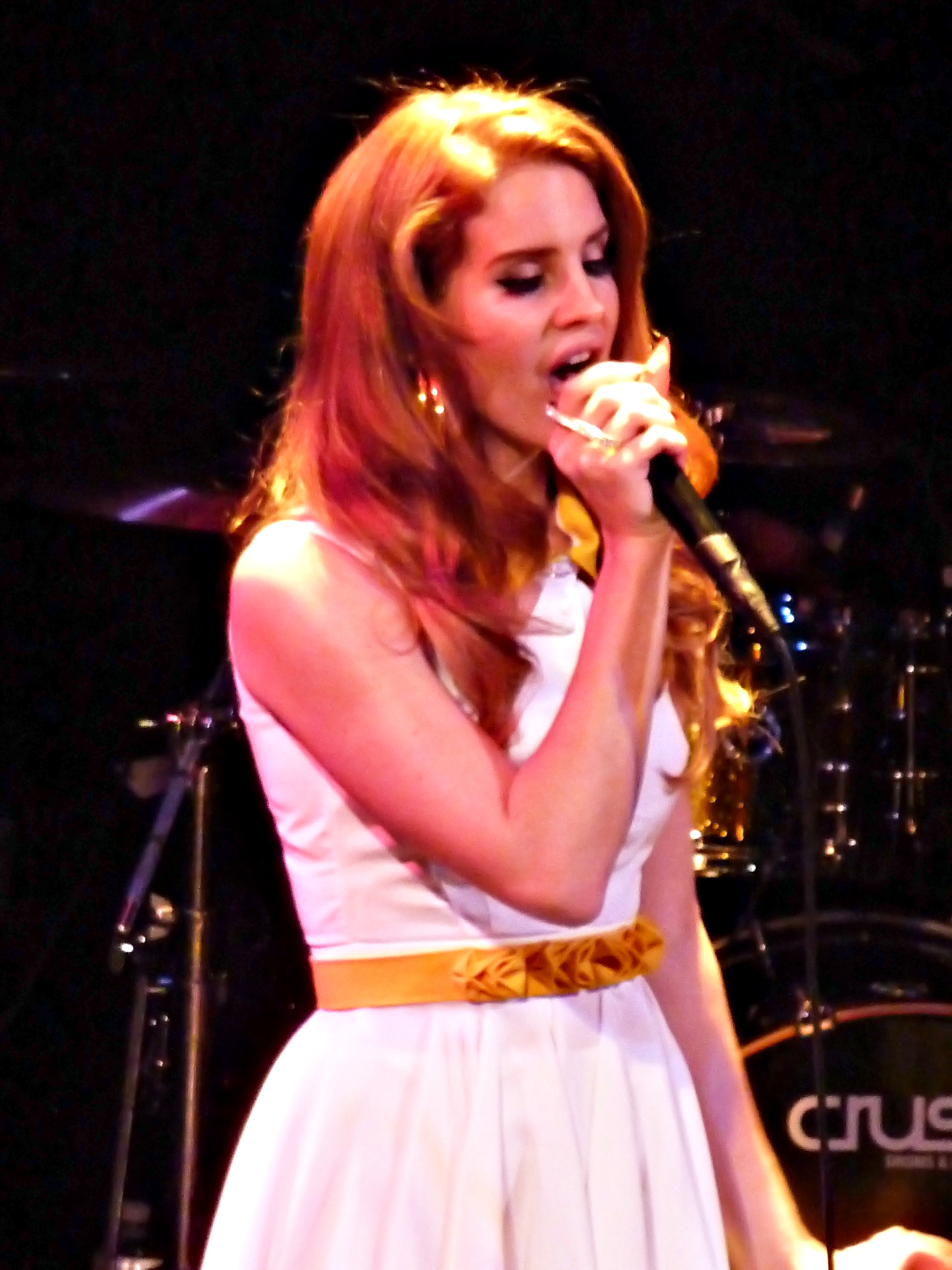
Del Rey performing at the Bowery Ballroom in 2011

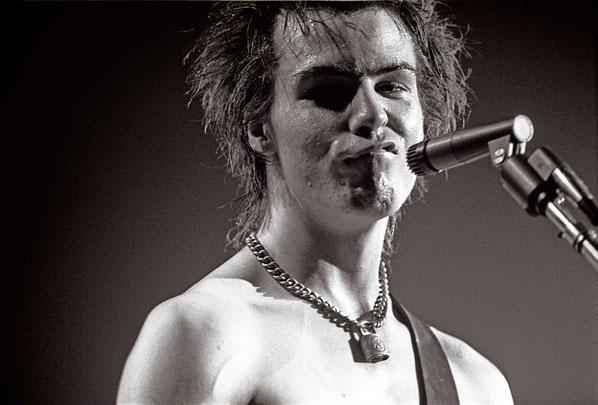
Del Rey references rock musician Sid Vicious (pictured) on several songs, including "Backfire", "Never Let Me Go", and "Hollywood's Dead".

=== As May Jailer ===
- In 2006, Del Rey recorded a demo album titled Sirens under the name May Jailer.

=== As 'Lizzy Grant' ===
- "Jimmy Gnecco" — Recorded in 2007, the song was part of the demo tape, No Kung Fu (2007). A writer for Vice magazine's I-D blog was positive of the song in his review and called the track "a beautiful — and rare — uptempo showcase for her breathy, soaring highs."

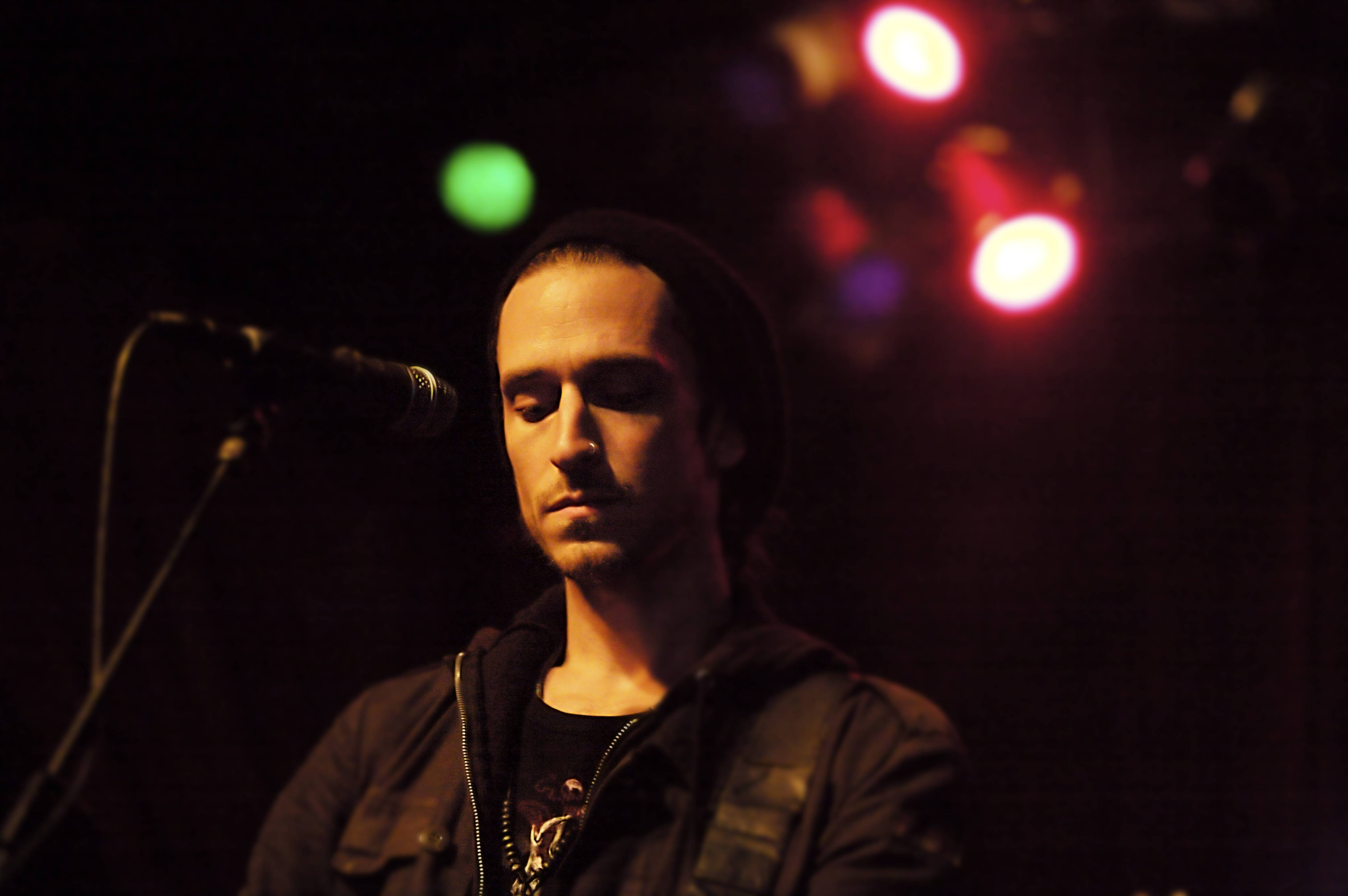
The song "Jimmy Gnecco" was written about the musician of the same name.

- "Get Drunk" — The song was recorded in 2007 and leaked shortly after Born to Die was released. The track was noted for "see[ing] Lana play the role of the vengeful woman, not the lovesick ride-or-die kind critics tend to peg her as" by a writer for Vice I-D.

=== As 'Sparkle Jump Rope Queen' ===
- "Elvis" — Recorded in 2008, the track was originally a part of the Sparkle Jump Rope Queen alias. In 2018, Del Rey "revived" the song to be a part of the Eugene Jarecki-directed Elvis Presley documentary, The King. Del Rey posted the demo onto the music-sharing website, Myspace, in 2008 alongside "Axl Rose Husband" and "Blue Ribbon".

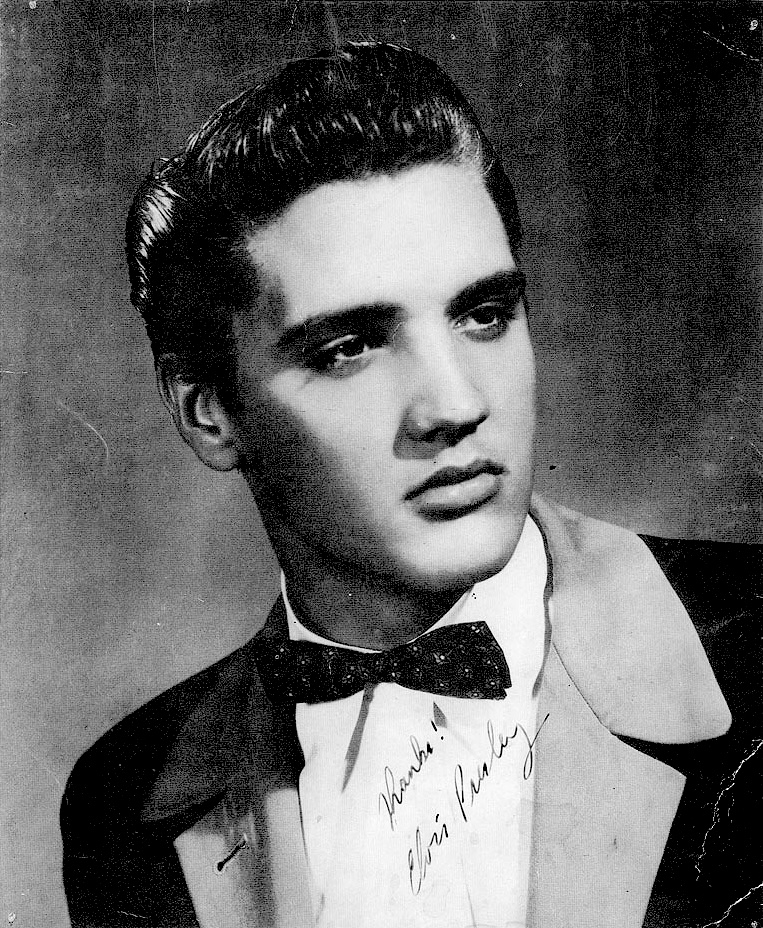
Del Rey has sung about Elvis Presley (pictured) eight times, most notably in her songs "Body Electric", "American", and the unreleased "Elvis".

- "Axl Rose Husband" — Recorded in 2008, the track was posted on Del Rey's Myspace account, under the name Sparkle Jump Rope Queen. The track sings of Del Rey's infatuation with the lead singer of Guns N' Roses, Axl Rose. Interest in the song was revived two separate times: first when rumors of Del Rey and Rose dating began in 2012 and another time in 2014 when the Ultraviolence track listing was revealed to have a song tentatively titled "Guns and Roses". In 2012, a demo of the track from 2007, titled "White Pontiac Heaven", was leaked online.

=== As 'Lana Del Rey' ===
- "Maha Maha" — Leaked in summer 2013. The track features a Bollywood sample in its instrumental.
- "So Legit" — Believed to be recorded in 2009, the song leaked in summer 2013 and is believed to be a "diss track" about fellow New Yorker, singer-songwriter Lady Gaga. Since the song's leak, Del Rey has seemed to make amends with Gaga as the two have been spotted posing for photos together at award shows since. On the topic of them knowing each other, Del Rey told Billboard: "Her manager, Bob Leone, was a confidante of mine, and he gave me a two-month scholarship to a songwriting class and put me on a list of Monday night lineups at the Cutting Room. We played a couple of shows together, but never met." Del Rey also dubbed the track as a misunderstanding.
- "Super Movie" — The song is an alternative version of the 2010 song, "On Our Way".
- "Golden Grill" — Leaked in summer 2013 by Princess Superstar, the song is believed to have been recorded in 2009.
- "Catch and Release" — Leaked in summer 2013 by Princess Superstar, the song is believed to have been recorded in 2009.
- "Heavy Hitter" — Recorded in 2009, a writer for Vice magazine said "a collaboration with hip hop producer Blockhead — is classic Lana."

=== As Phenomena ===
- "Disco" — The song "Disco" is Del Rey's only known track recorded under the moniker, "Phenomena".

== 2010–11: Developed sound as Lana Del Rey ==
- "Delicious" — Believed to have been recorded in 2011, the song was leaked in August 2012. MTV compared Del Rey's vocals to those of Nancy Sinatra and her the track's production to early 2010s Kesha.
- "Dynamite" — The song was leaked on December 21, 2012, and is believed to have been recorded in 2012.
- "Because of You" is an unreleased song by Lana Del Rey, produced by Sacha Skarbek in 2011. It is generally considered to be an outtake from the Born to Die sessions.
- "Be My Daddy" — Recorded in 2010, the song was leaked in 2016 alongside Ultraviolence outtakes "Fine China" and "Yes to Heaven" on Christmas Day.
- "Behind Closed Doors" — Recorded in 2010.
- "Backfire" — The track was leaked in 2012 and believed to have been recorded in 2010.
- "Afraid" — The song leaked in September 2012.
- "Children of the Bad Revolution" — Snippets of the song began leaking online in May 2016. The song was written and produced by Del Rey, James Dring and Jody Street, with two different demos produced by The Rural and Crispin Hunt, respectively. The song is believed to have been recorded in 2010. The song references Marilyn Monroe.
- "Playing Dangerous" — The song was recorded in 2010 and leaked in September 2012.
- "Never Let Me Go" — Dubbed as being country-influenced with a modern spin, the song leaked online in May 2012.
- "Noir" — The song was leaked on December 21, 2012, and is believed to have been recorded in 2012.
- "Meet Me in the Pale Moonlight" — Dubbed by the media as being "disco-infused", the track was leaked in April 2014, causing speculation that it would be included on Del Rey's then-forthcoming studio album, Ultraviolence. Following complaint from Del Rey and her management involving the leak, early shares of the leak were removed offline but have been continuously reposted since. In response to assertions that the track would be on Ultraviolence, Del Rey tweeted "wrote that for someone else 4 years ago...". In late 2021, The song gained popularity on the social media platform TikTok. This occurrence led to a surge in streams and an overall growth in popularity.
- "Put the Radio On" — Recorded in 2010, the song was written with and produced by Ash Howes and Biff Stannard. On May 22, 2010, Del Rey uploaded the song to her defunct SoundCloud profile alongside a demo of "Off to the Races".
- "Summer of Sam" — The track was leaked in early August 2012.
- "Television Heaven" — Believed to have been recorded in 2010, the track leaked in 2012.

== 2011–12: Demo recordings as Lana Del Rey ==
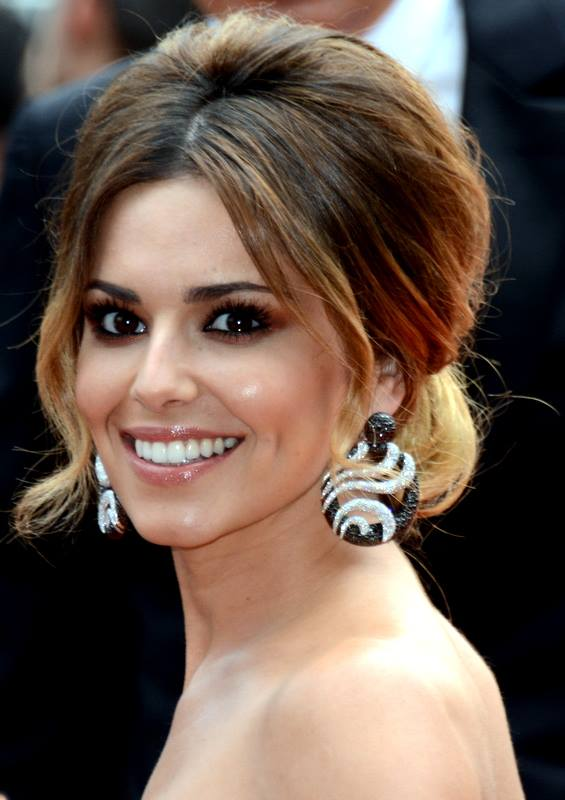
Del Rey wrote "Ghetto Baby" for Cheryl's album, A Million Lights.

- "Ghetto Baby" — In May 2012, singer Cheryl confirmed that she and Del Rey had collaborated on a track for her then-forthcoming album, A Million Lights. In an interview with Capital FM, Cheryl stated that she had noticed Del Rey "about a year ago. I was hearing these songs that were really fresh to my ear and amazing and I asked the guy who she was and he said, 'Watch out for her, it's a girl called Lana Del Rey'." The singer explained that she played another one of Del Rey's tracks and loved it so much, that it eventually led to a collaboration. "It all happened really organically just like that. And then 'Video Games' came out and I fell in love with her as an artist as well, so yeah, she's super talented." Del Rey had penned the song, which was cut from her second studio album, Born to Die. In September 2012, Del Rey's version of the track leaked online.
- "BBM Baby" — Recorded in 2011, the song leaked on Tumblr in August 2016. John Bonazzo of Observer called the song "an ode to Blackberry Messenger" and said the track "transports listeners to a time before iPhones and Facebook Messenger, when young lovers tapped messages back and forth on QWERTY keyboards." Chris Glover of Penguin Prison confirmed in a 2011 interview that he wrote the song with Del Rey.
- "Butterflies, Pt. 2" — The song was co-written and produced with Jim Irvin and Tim Larcombe.
- "Big Bad Wolf" — Believed to have been recorded in 2011, the song was leaked in August 2012.
- "Queen of Disaster" — Recorded in 2011 and leaked in summer 2013, the song was initially believed to have been recorded as an outtake of Born to Die (2012). The song was originally rumored to have been a leaked single. Upon its leak, the song was being illegally played in clothing stores, shopping malls, and other public spaces, due to its popularity before having a resurgence in popularity in January 2020 after going viral on TikTok. With a spike in streams, the song gained a collective 300 million plays across all uploads on SoundCloud, YouTube, and TikTok, with the most popular YouTube upload with 20 million views being removed shortly afterwards.
- "Ridin'" — "Ridin'" is a song by American rapper ASAP Rocky with vocals by American singer Lana Del Rey. The song was originally recorded in 2012 for its producers The Kickdrums' mixtape, Follow the Leaders, though it was not featured in the final track listing.
- "Riverside" — Recorded in 2014, the song was a collaboration between Del Rey and her then-boyfriend, Scottish singer-songwriter Barrie-James O'Neill. O'Neill revealed a snippet of the song on December 17, 2014. The full length leaked on September 22, 2015.
- "Life Is Beautiful" — In 2015, a Del Rey song titled "Life Is Beautiful" was revealed in the trailer for the film, The Age of Adaline. The film's studio, Lionsgate, went on to release a minute-long snippet on its YouTube channel, though the song was evidently not included on the soundtrack, however the full version of the song was leaked on August 2, 2020.
- "Spender" — A collaboration with rapper Smiler, the track was originally meant to be included on his mixtape All I Know.

== Outtakes ==
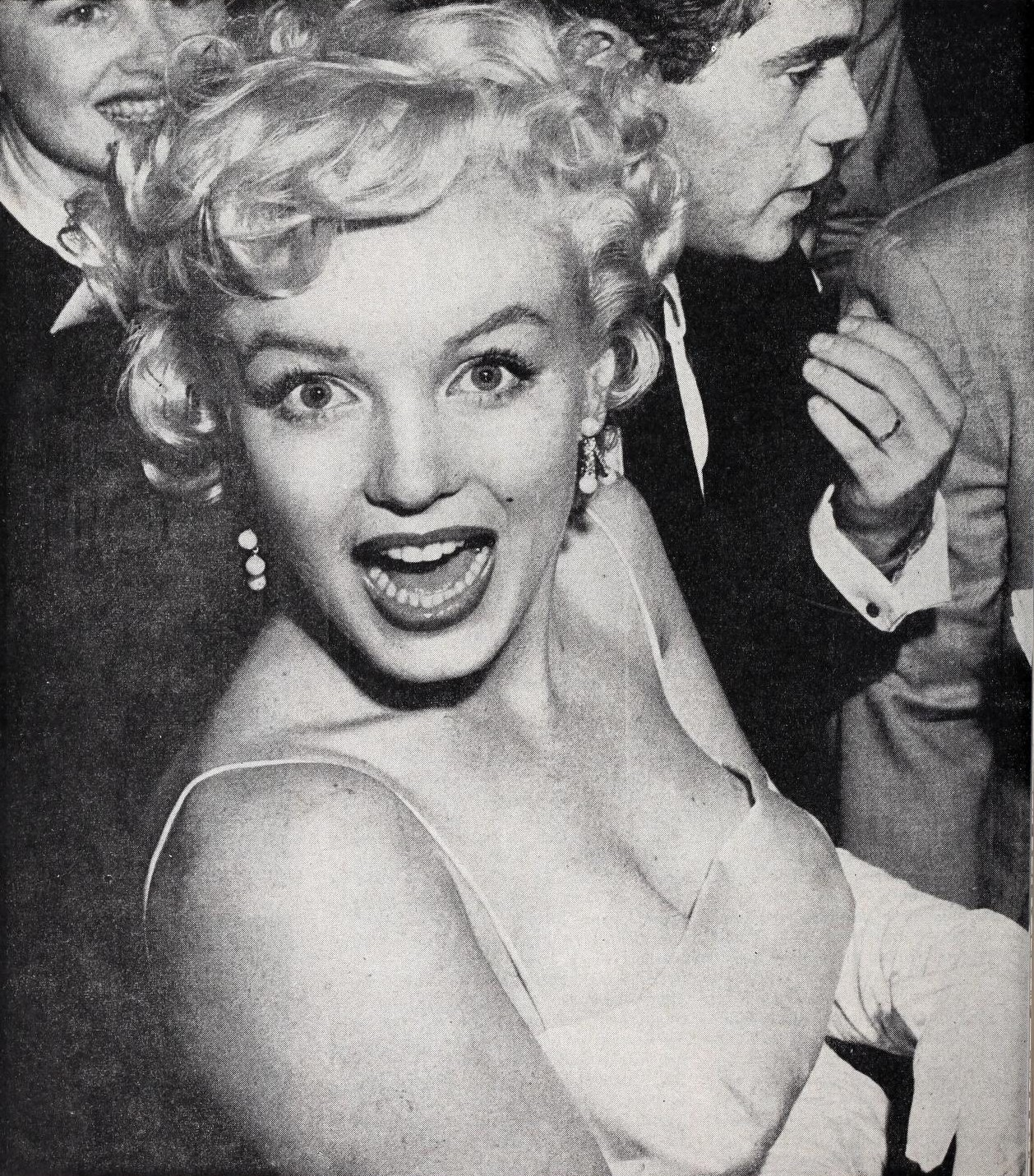
Sometimes called "Puppy Love", the song "Marilyn Monroe" was written about the 1950s Hollywood star of the same name.

=== Born to Die (2009–12) ===
- "Hundred Dollar Bill" — Del Rey would often perform the song alongside "Yayo".
- "Driving in Cars with Boys" — The song was produced by The Nexus and written by its members, David Sneddon and James Bauer-Mein, alongside Del Rey. Demos of the song were recorded in 2010 and 2011, causing speculation that it is an outtake from the Born to Die sessions. Thematically, the song is about wishing to live life on the edge and to the fullest, with Del Rey declaring she'll "spend her whole life, driving in cars with boys" and how she won't settle down. The song is often praised by critics for its edgy lyrics, vocal delivery, and production. Bustle called the song one of Del Rey's "standout" unreleased tracks. Billboard magazine called the song one of her "gems" that had been "left on the cutting room floor". Dan Weiss of the magazine added that "It's amazing that Del Rey hasn't used the "Be My Baby" beat more often, but when she finally does, it rips full albums by The Raveonettes a new one, with swaggering, huge chord changes and one of her most lyrical choruses ever." The blog, Fluently Forward, praised the song as Del Rey's best unreleased track and called for the song to be professionally mastered and released.
- "On Our Way" — The song was recorded in 2010 and leaked in 2012, it was later reworked into an alternative demo titled "Super Movie".
- "Kinda Outta Luck" — Recorded in 2010, the track received one of Del Rey's signature "homemade video" treatments for its online release.
- "Marilyn Monroe" / "Puppy Love" — Recorded in 2010, the song leaked in 2012.
- "Velvet Crowbar" — Del Rey uploaded it to her defunct SoundCloud profile on March 22, 2010.
- "You Can Be the Boss" — It was recorded in 2010 and co-written and produced by Joe Henson and Alexis Smith of The Flight. Del Rey uploaded the song to her defunct SoundCloud profile on March 22, 2010. During 2010, Del Rey created a homemade music video for the song featuring clips of Del Rey herself singing along to the song and clips she gathered from miscellaneous films and videos. Footage of Del Rey in this video is mostly shot in black and white or muted colors. The track was also performed numerous times in 2011 and once in 2015.
- "Serial Killer" — It was recorded as one of the first tracks for Del Rey's second studio album, Born to Die (2012), but didn't make the cut. The lyrics and musical composition are attributed to Del Rey and Peter Ibsen. It was promoted by a number of live performances in 2015 and 2016.

=== Paradise (2011–12) ===
- "Hollywood" — Recorded in 2012, the track evidently leaked. While discussing the song "Hollywood's Dead", Del Rey mentioned another song named "Hollywood" that had leaked with wrong instrumental, adding her plans to release it in the future if she does a compilation album of her favorite unreleased songs. Del Rey then went on to sing a verse of the song in an Instagram livestream.

=== Ultraviolence (2013–14) ===
In December 2013, Del Rey and producer Rick Nowels worked on a series of tracks together for her second major-label album, Ultraviolence (2014). Among the notable tracks in these sessions were some songs which made the cut, including "Shades of Cool", "Sad Girl", and "Is This Happiness", while "I Can Fly", "Yes to Heaven", and "Your Girl" were some of the leaked songs which had been scrapped from the project due to the record's change in sound. Prior to the album's release, a mass leak in mid-2013 saw songs including "Queen of Disaster", "So Legit", "Maha Maha", and "Black Beauty" being leaked. On the topic of the leak, Del Rey told NME magazine how discouraging it was, adding how "even songs I've never emailed to myself [were accessed]. There are hundreds of them..." and in response to them being from her early career, she added that "some of them were, but some of them, like 'Black Beauty', weren't...". "Say Yes to Heaven" was released on May 19, 2023.

Released/repurposed

- "I Can Fly" — Possibly meant to be originally for Ultraviolence, this track was eventually used in the film Big Eyes (2014), as producers found Del Rey's theme-of-the-same-name for the film to be too sad to end the film as the song in the credits.

=== Honeymoon (2014–15) ===
Released/repurposed

- "Crazy For You" — Meant to be originally for Honeymoon, it leaked in portions in 2022, was suddenly registered on music publishing databases in early 2026, and was eventually used in the Grand Theft Auto VI: The Album soundtrack (2026), with lyrics that slightly differ from the initial leaked version.

=== Lust for Life (2015–17) ===
- "Roses Bloom for You" — It was recorded in early 2017 and produced by Rick Nowels. On June 3, 2017, Del Rey shared a video on her Instagram profile of herself recording the song in the studio with Nowels.

Released/repurposed

- "The Next Best American Record" — Recorded in early 2016, a demo leaked in early 2017 under the name "Architecture". The song is sometimes alternatively referred to as "Best American Record". Del Rey said that the track and fellow Lust for Life outtake "Yosemite", were like "Yin-Yang" to one another. She later mentioned during a promotional tour for the record that she would like to release the two songs as standalone folk singles at some point. The song was later used on Del Rey's follow-up record, Norman Fucking Rockwell, in 2019.
- "Yosemite" — In anticipation for her fifth studio album, Del Rey teased the track "Yosemite" in interviews as well as on her social media. The song was later included on her seventh studio album, Chemtrails over the Country Club.

=== Norman Fucking Rockwell! (2018–19) ===
- "Hey Blue Baby" — An outtake from Del Rey's 2019 record, the track was debuted by Del Rey and the record's producer, Jack Antonoff, at his Ally Coalition event in New York.
- "I Must Be Stupid for Feeling So Happy" — An outtake from Del Rey's 2019 record, the track was debuted by Del Rey and the record's producer, Jack Antonoff, at his Ally Coalition event in New York.

=== Did You Know That There's A Tunnel Under Ocean Blvd (2023) ===
- "Zodiac" — An outtake from Del Rey's 2023 album, replaced with the track Candy Necklace.

=== Other ===
- "Dealer" — From a scrapped album recorded in 2017 with the Last Shadow Puppets. Del Rey described the song as "just screaming my head off". The song was planned to be reused on Chemtrails over the Country Club. The uncertainty of the song being included on the album was one of the reasons that the album's release was postponed from October 2020 to March 2021. It was later featured on Blue Banisters, released later that year.
- "All About Ethel" – a song Del Rey previewed on Instagram in August 2025; it contained the lyrics "Ethel Cain hated my Instagram post", leading media to speculate the two were feuding.
