= West Coast (Lana Del Rey song) =

2014 single by Lana Del Rey

Single by Lana Del Rey

from the album Ultraviolence
- Released: April 14, 2014
- Recorded: 2013
- Studio: Easy Eye Sound (Nashville, Tennessee); The Bridge (Glendale, California)
- Genre: Psychedelic rock; soft rock
- Length: 4:16 (album version); 3:48 (radio edit)
- Label: Interscope; Polydor
- Songwriters: Elizabeth Grant; Rick Nowels
- Producer: Dan Auerbach

Lana Del Rey singles chronology
"Once Upon a Dream" (2014)	"West Coast" (2014)	"Shades of Cool" (2014)

Music video
- "West Coast" on YouTube

"West Coast" is a song by American singer-songwriter Lana Del Rey from her third studio album, Ultraviolence (2014). Written by Del Rey and Rick Nowels, it is a melancholy love song about a woman torn between love and ambition, and as a dedication to the West Coast of the United States. A psychedelic rock and soft rock ballad, the song was noted to be an evolution and more guitar-orientated in sound for Del Rey and was produced by Dan Auerbach of The Black Keys. Described as a two-in-one song, its shifting tempo transitions downward by nearly 60 beats per minute at the chorus in a rhythmical shift reminiscent of The Beatles' 1965 single "We Can Work It Out", introduced by the guitar lick that begins The Beatles' 1964 single "And I Love Her". In the song, Del Rey's vocals comprises a more sensual and demented tone than in her previous releases, and are often sung in an anxious "breathy" style.

Released as the lead single from Ultraviolence on April 14, 2014, "West Coast" received widespread acclaim from music critics who commended its unconventional composition and Del Rey's uncharacteristic vocal delivery. Several news media sources went on to list it as one of the best songs of 2014, including Consequence of Sound, NME and Spin. "West Coast" debuted at number 17 on the Billboard Hot 100, becoming Del Rey's highest debut and third highest-charting single in the United States, while also being her first single to enter Billboard's Rock Airplay chart where it reached number 26. "West Coast" marked Del Rey's eighth Top 40 hit in the United Kingdom where it peaked at number 21 on the UK Singles Chart.

The accompanying black-and-white music video, directed by Vincent Haycock, was released on May 7, 2014. Filmed at Marina del Rey and Venice, California, it uses a minimalist and melancholy approach to depict Del Rey torn between two love interests, one of which is portrayed by Hollywood tattoo artist Mark Mahoney. The music video was well received by critics and was nominated for a 2014 MTV Video Music Award for Best Cinematography. Del Rey promoted "West Coast" with live performances at Coachella Valley Music and Arts Festival, Austin City Limits Music Festival and Glastonbury Festival 2014. The song has also been covered by James Vincent McMorrow, Royal Blood, Missio, Kungs and Max Jury.

== Background ==
That's what someone just said to me when I was on the beach, I was at a beach party, he said 'they've got a sayin' if you're not drinkin' then you're not playin'' I thought it was a cute opening line. For me it's like thinking about the way things were for me, and how my motivations were for so long, they still seem a part of my life even though I'm not drinking now. For some reason I really like soaking up the mood of like a really dynamic party whether it's on the West Coast or whatever. I like that other people can have fun and let loose. I feel like I'm a part of it when I'm there – so yeah, I felt comfortable with it.

— Del Rey discussing the song's opening lyric

"West Coast" was written by Del Rey and her frequent collaborator Rick Nowels in California, with Del Rey composing its lyrics and melody, and Nowels its chords. In November 2013, Del Rey traveled to Electric Lady Studios in New York City, which she occupied for five weeks alone, and produced the track by herself from a guitar before later hiring session drummer Maximilian Weissenfeldt, while Nowels would come by "every now and then". Together, they produced the initial recording of "West Coast" as a classic rock-inspired song. Del Rey developed the track as a dedication to the West Coast of the United States, but with the intention of it being more psychological, which resulted in the track becoming distant from that of the verse–chorus form. She felt the song's slow, shifting tempo was important because it reflected her mental state during its writing. Del Rey initially completed her third studio album Ultraviolence in December 2013, but at the time was dissatisfied with a demo she had recorded for "West Coast". She then met Dan Auerbach of The Black Keys by chance at Electric Lady Studios and then again on a night out in Queens, New York, and realized she needed to re-record the track to incorporate his looser production techniques. That night Del Rey explained to Auerbach her interest to develop a song containing jazz undertones, "West Coast fusion" influenced by The Beach Boys and the Eagles, and a 1970s Laurel Canyon-type revival.

Subsequently, Del Rey traveled to Nashville, Tennessee to re-record "West Coast" and tracks from its parent album with Auerbach in a 3-week session at his studio, Easy Eye Sound. She invited him to add a more casual, California vibe to the song by recording in single takes, with a blues-like Shure SM58 microphone. According to Auerbach, the recording of "West Coast" was sung "99% live" by Del Rey in a room adjacent to one where a seven-piece band were recording the track's instrumentation. Auerbach produced the song's electric guitar, shaker, 12-string acoustic guitar and synthesizer instrumentation, while Nick Movshon was credited as a bassist and drummer on "West Coast". The track's strings were recorded separately from the main recording at a studio in Glendale, California called The Bridge.

Del Rey opined that the track's demo sounded very different to Auerbach's reproduction. When Del Rey first played "West Coast" to her record label, Interscope Records, they were dissatisfied with its chorus being slower in beats per minute than its verses. They responded to her, stating, "None of these songs are good for radio and now you're slowing them down when they should be speeded up". In an interview with The Guardian, Del Rey explained that she felt "murky" with her life during the song's writing, and it was that feeling which influenced it to sound disconnected from mainstream pop.

== Composition ==
"West Coast" (2014)
A 25-second sample of the song, where it shifts downward in tempo between its verse and chorus, in which Del Rey's restrained vocal shifts to a more sweeping, cinematic style.

A psychedelic rock and soft rock ballad, "West Coast" also contains elements of reggae, indie rock, Latin rock, 1960s music, 1980s "drive time," and "narcoticized" swing. The track's subversive sound is the result of its comprising jagged instrumentation and laid-back groove, similar to that of the Classics IV's "Spooky" (1967). The opening riff solicits a "wavy" sound reminiscent of The Black Keys' Turn Blue (2014), and is continued throughout the rest of the song. Described as a two-in-one track, its shifting tempo transcends downward during the chorus mark, following into a rhythmical shift reminiscent of The Beatles' "We Can Work It Out" (1965), Being more guitar-orientated than the singer's previous output, it is based around minimal, country-tinged, surf guitar, and "twangy" drum instrumentation. The track's slower second section opens with a descending blues riff reminiscent of The Beatles' "And I Love Her" (1964), in which the production switches between a half-mumbled baritone and layered choral symphony, among neo-noir motif. Its chorus scythes across juddering bass and off-kilter percussion instrumentation. Towards the end of the track's duration, a stray burst of G-funk shrill synth is solicited.

Incorporating an ease to her vocal delivery, Del Rey eased her vocal delivery by crooning the hook "Move baby, move baby / Ooh baby, ooh baby" throughout the chorus shift, in a style that recalls Stevie Nicks' "Edge of Seventeen" (1982). Del Rey uses an inexpressive, ventriloquizing tone in the song, with her voice being layered into the track's production by means of reverberation. In addition, her vocals use a more sensual and sinister tone than in her previous discography, and are often sung in an anxious and "breathy" style, and in an octave just above a whisper. She also sings the track's backing vocals which in part contribute to the song's ethereal feel, through distant, faraway moans. MuuMuse's Bradley Stern observed that Del Rey's voice skipped between "breathy franticness and slurred, drugged-out ecstasy". Throughout the song, she restrains her delivery during its verses, but sings in a sweeping, cinematic style in its chorus.

"West Coast" was noted to be a cross between the works of bands Portishead and Beach House. It was also highlighted that the track deviated from Del Rey's formula in Born to Die and Paradise (2012), as an evolution of their sound, though without doing so in its entirety. Harriet Gibsone of The Guardian described it as "side-stepping slowly from the Twin Peaks melodrama of Born to Die," while Tim Jonze of the same publication said the song "ditched the hip-hop trappings of Born to Die". Its eeriness, omnipresent in previous Del Rey tracks, takes on a full-on psychedelia sound, recalling The Turtles' "You Showed Me" (1969). "West Coast" is set in the simple time signature of 4/4, with a moderately fast tempo of 123 beats per minute in its verses, and a slow tempo of 65 beats per minute in its chorus. It is composed in the key of F♯ minor, with Del Rey's vocals spanning the range from F♯_{2} to C♯_{5}. The track has basic a chord progression of F♯m-F♯m-E-D-F♯m-E-D in its first verse, and Bm-D-F♯m-F♯m-C♯m-D-D-E in its chorus.

A melancholy love song, its lyrics depict a woman torn between love and ambition. "West Coast" also serves as a dedication to Del Rey's California hometown, and elicits imagery from its titular location. In the song, she sings about leaving a lover for the Californian promise of fame, and emphasizes on a gulf between a sweetly uncomplicated romance and a boozily dysfunctional relationship. Similarly to her previous works, the lyrics are both specific and vague, and complement the track's "dreamlike" sonics. "West Coast" sets up a disunity between form and content, and though a love song, its sound is more reminiscent to that of a breakup song. It was also noted that the lyrics depict a vivid picture of teenage summer memories and forgotten romance. Comparing the track's lyrical content to that of Sonic Youth's "Superstar" (1994), Grantland's Molly Lambert analyzed: "While Born to Die–era Lana often displayed a preening 'please notice me, Mr. Producer!' energy, the Lana of 'West Coast' sounds like a starlet struggling not to become disaffected with show business after feeling her way through a few too many casting-couch sessions, still hoping that big break might be on the horizon."

== Release ==
"West Coast" served as the lead single from Ultraviolence. The song's title was first announced by the singer on April 3, 2014, on Facebook and Twitter. On April 10, 2014, Del Rey posted the track's single art on Twitter with the lyric, "Down on the West Coast, they got a sayin'...", as its caption. The same caption was used in a promotional billboard which was put up in Los Angeles the same day. The heavily yellow artwork, which makes use of an Instagram filter camera lens, features Del Rey donning soft makeup while standing on a Californian coastline afront crashing waves. She has a forlorn facial expression in the cover, and is depicted with a subtle frown with her eyes staring straight into the camera. Del Rey sports a beach-inspired look with a wave-like hair style, denim jacket and white shirt. Some critics speculated that the artwork hinted that the sound of "West Coast" would continue in the laid-back style of Born to Die. "West Coast" was premiered by BBC Radio 1's Fearne Cotton on April 14, 2014, and the track's audio was uploaded to the singer's Vevo page later that day. The song was first solicited to contemporary hit radio in Italy also on April 14, 2014. It was later released as a digital download in Canada and the United States on April 22, 2014, and then in most international territories a day later. However, the digital release of "West Coast" was slated to May 25, 2014 in the United Kingdom, and May 30, 2014 in Germany. The song impacted modern rock radio in the United States on June 3, 2014.

A remix by Dan Heath—who produced Del Rey's "Blue Jeans" (2012)—was premiered by Vice on May 19, 2014. A shorter mix by Auerbach which featured stronger, clearer emphasis on Del Rey's vocals was designated as the radio edit of the song. Auerbach's new version solicited a significantly lighter sound than the original, and incorporates elements of Caribbean and tropical music. Several other remixes were commissioned for the release of "West Coast", including remixes by Alle Farben, Camo & Krooked, Four Tet, Jabberwocky, MK, Solomun, The Young Professionals and Zhu.

== Critical reception ==
"West Coast" received universal acclaim from contemporary music critics. Michael Nelson of Stereogum commented, "This is just a haunting, hypnotic piece of music that sends chills up and down my entire skeleton, especially when the tempo shifts downward on the chorus". Nylon writer Liza Darwin deemed the track "silky-smooth" and "total ear candy". Lauren Valenti of Marie Claire lauded the song as "a slice of retro heaven". The track was noted by Stern to be "revolutionary" in the sense that it sounded "entirely different from anything being offered in pop music at the moment" and deemed it "the very antithesis of everything radio in 2014". Kyle Fowle of The A.V. Club named "West Coast" as the album's most accomplished track and "the one song on Ultraviolence that gets the formula of Lana Del Rey right". AltSounds deemed the track as one of Del Rey's best works and one of the best singles released in 2014. The publication went on to opine, "when songs defy descriptions, and artists defy expectation, they tend to stick around long after the 'pop hits' and divas have suck back into obscurity". Oyster journalist Jerico Mandybur commented, "there's no denying that the song has excellent aural pulling power, especially if you like your odes to LA mysterious, darkly surfy and dripping in femme fatale".

Carolyn Menyes of the Music Times named "West Coast" as one of her favorite Del Rey songs to-date, highlighting Auerbach's influence as what benefited it most. In her review, she went on to opine, "Her voice plays off it well, too, and she actually feels passionate on this song, as opposed to her typical bored thing". While Caitlyn Carter, Joey DeGroot and Kyle Dowling of the same publication named it a stand-out on Ultraviolence. Kate Hutchinson of The Guardian called it "one of the finest pop songs of the last five years". While Kitty Empire of the same publication wrote, "The engaging West Coast improves on every hearing, a clever two-in-one track rich with detail, rhythm, atmospherics and class". Drowned in Sound's Robert Leedham said that with "West Coast", Del Rey developed a song to "trump" "Video Games" (2011), and a "new found guttural swagger". Leedham also commended Del Rey's key changes, "masterful" sway from tension, and reverberation in the song. Scott T. Sterling of the CBS Corporation opined that the track expanded the dimensions of Del Rey's sound, and that it was "one of the most distinctive hits of 2014". The Boston Globe writer James Reed commented, "'West Coast' has a noirish sensuality, which opens into a chorus that mimicks the heady rush of a first toke".

Caryn Ganz of Rolling Stone called the track a "striking departure" in sound for Del Rey, and said its groove transformed her "from chanteuse into frontwoman for a few glorious moments". In a review of Ultraviolence, Mike Diver of Clash said that in the context of the album, "West Coast" took on greater significance by serving as a fulcrum which balances the record into "leaving a better impression than it otherwise might". Consequence of Sound's Sasha Geffen described the song as "a counterintuitive gem" and "the sort of thing that rings beautifully from old car windows on hot summer evenings," while Marissa G. Muller of Vice called the track "one of the Golden State's best-ever anthems".

=== Recognition ===
"West Coast" was listed as one of the best songs of 2014 by several news media sources. On The Village Voice's Pazz and Jop critics' year-end list in 2014, "West Coast" was ranked at number 49. Cosmopolitan placed "West Coast" at number 3 on its list of the 50 Best Songs of 2014. The staff of the Music Times also placed "West Coast" at number 3 on their list of the 25 Best Songs of 2014, with De Groot writing, "With the release of 'West Coast,' Lana Del Rey's music finally converged with the complexity and intensity of her persona, and it was glorious". The single was named one of the 50 best songs of 2014 by NME (number 11), Consequence of Sound (number 25), and Stereogum (number 31). Spin ranked the track at number 29 on their list of the 101 Best Songs of 2014, while also deeming it "the lushest and most narcoleptic Top 40 hit of 2014". Joshua Ostroff of The Huffington Post placed "West Coast" at number 12 on his list of the Best Songs of 2014, calling it "perhaps too dark to win the song of the summer title it deserved".

== Commercial performance ==
Despite not being heavily promoted to radio in the United States at the time, "West Coast" debuted at number 17 on the Billboard Hot 100 for the week ending May 3, 2014. It marked Del Rey's highest debut and her second-highest charting single on the chart, behind "Summertime Sadness" which peaked at number 6 in September 2013. 68% of the single's chart points in its opening week were attributed to digital sales of 118,000 copies, while the remaining 32% were attributed to 2.7 million streams. "West Coast" consequently debuted at number 6 and number 16 on the Digital Songs and Streaming Songs charts respectively. The song fell off the Billboard Hot 100 in its second week, but re-entered the chart at number 100 on July 5, 2014, following the release of Ultraviolence. "West Coast" became Del Rey's first single to chart on the Rock Airplay chart where it peaked at number 26 and spent a total of 9 weeks on the chart.

In Canada, "West Coast" bowed at number 26 on the Canadian Hot 100 issued for May 3, 2014. It marked Del Rey's second highest-peaking single in the country, after "Summertime Sadness" which peaked at number 7. In Oceania, "West Coast" entered the Australian Singles Chart at its peak of number 44 on May 4, 2014, and spent two weeks on the chart in total. While the song also debuted at number 31 on the New Zealand Singles Chart where it became Del Rey's third single to chart in New Zealand after "Summertime Sadness" and "Young and Beautiful".

"West Coast" entered the French Singles Chart at number 34 for the week ending April 26, 2014; it consequently became Del Rey's seventh top 40 hit in France, and spent 26 weeks on the chart in total. On the German Singles Chart, "West Coast" peaked at number 22, charting for a total of 14 weeks, while also marking the singer's fourth top 40 hit in Germany. In Ireland, "West Coast" bowed at number 31 on the Irish Singles Chart issued for April 17, 2014, becoming Del Rey's fifth top 40 hit in the country and spending 7 weeks on the chart in total. "West Coast" initially placed at number 14 in the midweek UK Singles Chart, but later debuted at number 21 on the chart issued for June 7, 2014, with first-week sales of 15,649 copies. Following the release of Ultraviolence in the United Kingdom, "West Coast" rebounded to number 36 with sales of 5,517 units. The song became Del Rey's eighth top 40 hit in the country and went on to accumulate a total of 6 weeks on the chart. Elsewhere, "West Coast" peaked within the top 10 in Greece and Israel, and the top 20 in Hungary, Italy, Scotland, Spain and Switzerland.

== Music video ==
=== Development and release ===
The accompanying music video for "West Coast" was directed by Vincent Haycock, and shot at Marina del Rey, California and in Venice, Los Angeles, in early April 2014. Aside from Del Rey, the clip also features Hollywood tattoo artist Mark Mahoney who plays the singer's love interest in the clip's chorus segment, and American model Bradley Soileau who plays the same role in another scene. Del Rey described Mahoney as her confidante, lover and procurer in the video. In an interview with Clash, the singer mentioned, "Like the record, [the music video is] atmospheric, and you catch a directional vibe, but it's not that pointed, and it's hard to tell what is going on". She attained inspiration for the clip from the Chet Baker documentary Let's Get Lost (1988), and her love of the red dress effect. The singer also wanted the video to be mood-driven, and for its final scene, to transcend from black-and-white imagery to an "HD color dream scene".

Images from the music video first emerged online on April 7, 2014. The audio release of "West Coast" on April 14, 2014, was accompanied by a looped, black-and-white snippet from the music video of the singer embracing a leather jacket-clad man at the beach. On April 24, 2014, following the single's debut on the Billboard Hot 100, it was announced that the video would premiere "in the next few days". Del Rey later released a teaser of the visual on Instagram on May 2, 2014. The footage featured the same shots obtained for the audio loop, and Del Rey smoking and lighting a cigarette, Sunset Strip billboards and incomplete couplets. On May 6, 2014, Interscope prematurely uploaded an unfinished version of the clip, before promptly removing it and then premiering the finished version a day later. It was digitally released on the iTunes Store on May 12, 2014. The music video has since drawn in more than 100 million views on YouTube.

=== Synopsis ===
A screenshot of a scene from the black-and-white music video, filmed at Marina del Rey, California, with model Bradley Soileau playing Del Rey's love interest

The black-and-white music video was noted to have predominantly dark, brooding, hazy, mysterious and sun-stroked imagery, and portrays Del Rey evoking her distinguished personality. Using a minimalist and melancholy approach, it features several artistic shots of California scenery and cameo appearances by two men portrayed as bad boy archetypes. Del Rey engages in 1960s apparition, numerous swaying and twirling actions, and sings with her eyes closed throughout the music video. CBS Corporation writer Courtney E. Smith described the clip as "the yin and yang of youthful hope, the kind Hollywood lives by attracting, and cynical industry, the kind Hollywood thrives on but hides".

The video begins with rolling waves and shots of palm tree-lined roads, and gulls. A posse of skateboarders are also pictured in this scene. At first, the clip appears to function in small, romantic gestures, reminiscent to that of a fashion magazine advertisement. The singer is pictured in two visually different love affairs. In the first, Del Rey is shown clinging to a younger, long-haired blond, leather-clad man on a beach, where she narcotically flits around the Pacific Ocean shorefront, and splashes in its waves with him. At the 1:20 mark, the song and its visuals simultaneously switch up, with the singer being pictured donning diamond jewelry, sitting alongside a more mature and svengali-type man who wears sunglasses, as a chauffeured convertible barrels forward in slow motion. Del Rey's love interest in this segment recalls age disparity in sexual relationships, producer Robert Evans, and Scott Weiland. In another scene, the two are depicted nuzzling and smoking in the back seat of the car. Del Rey depicts a woozy and solemn persona in these segments, while the pair caress each other under passing streetlights. The clip then returns to the scene of Del Rey and her younger love interest on the beach. The aforementioned segments are intercut with scenes that appear to be shot on a low-quality camcorder.

A plot twist then occurs towards the clip's ending with the use of fire and technicolored imagery, where Del Rey gently brushes her hair off her shoulders in the middle of superimposed flames. The singer sports a red dress in the Sunset Boulevard-styled scene and sings "I'm in love" continuously while up in flames, until the music video fades out.

=== Analysis and reception ===
The music video for "West Coast" was noted to share several similarities with Del Rey's previous videography. Its black-and-white, old-school imagery recall her video for "Blue Jeans" and the introduction to "National Anthem". While the home-recorded footage scenes were a technique previously used in "Video Games" and "Summertime Sadness", and its tattooed hand close-ups recall those of "National Anthem". One of Del Rey's love interests in the clip, Soileau, previously appeared in the same role in "Blue Jeans" and "Born to Die", while another shares appearance similarities to her love interest in "Ride". Del Rey's characteristic cat eye-make up and swaying actions were also highlighted. Speculation arose that her mature love interest in the visual was inspired by the "old man" character she sang of in "Off to the Races" and her then-fiancé, Barrie-James O'Neill. The clip garnered comparisons to Chris Isaak's music video for "Wicked Game" (1990).

The visual was well received by music critics and was nominated for a 2014 MTV Video Music Award for Best Cinematography, but lost to Beyoncé's music video "Pretty Hurts". Chad Saville of the Greenspun Media Group called the clip a "mysterious, yet artful celebration of all things California". Opining that the music video was "Lana Being Lana," Billboard journalist Jason Lipshutz commented: "Will she burn her past and head towards the west coast in search of stardom? In many respects, she's already there." Lipshutz's view was echoed by John Boone of E! who deemed "West Coast" Del Rey's "most Lana Del Rey-y video yet" and noted that it contained "the most glamorous smoking you've ever seen". Refinery29's Hayden Manders said the clip contained the three elements of a "perfect Del Rey video"; "cigarettes, a tragic Hollywood starlet and Bradley Soileau". Manders went on to write that "West Coast" contained "enough melancholy to give 'Summertime Sadness' a run for its moody money". Rolling Stone writer Killian Young felt that the clip evoked the style of old-fashioned Hollywood film noir. While HitFix's Melinda Newman felt the visual was a "time-told tale in Hollywood," but "so well-realized, [...] It could play out in Double Indemnity and The Postman Always Rings Twice fashion".

Writing for Slant Magazine, Alexa Camp said the music video faithfully mirrored the song's lyrics and was understated by Del Rey's usual standards. Darwin who opined that the clip recalled Del Rey's short film Tropico (2013), deemed it "a total cinematic gem," and "a gorgeous mashup of retro glamour and modern independence". The visual was also lauded by Complex writer Lauren Nostro who called it a "stunning, cinematic" and "beautiful" video, and Anna Moslein of Glamour who deemed it "summer-perfect". Zumic's Bradley Bershad described the clip as "a slightly bizarre, very dramatic trip through time and space" and said its noir influences matched the track well, adding that its "old school meets new school" feel continued the musical persona Del Rey had crafted for herself. Bershad's view was shared by Smith who wrote, "It pretty well marries together her continuing play with female sexuality, Hollywood stereotypes and insistence that she is her own creation". While DeGroot commended the video's black-and-white photography and flame imagery which he opined were less pretentious than that of "Jeremy", which "West Coast" was compared to. Matthew Bramlett of TheWrap opined that Del Rey "perfectly encapsulates her 'vintage California rich kid' look" in the video and described the clip as "very chic, with just a twinge of the old Hollywood flair" the singer had embraced in her previous visuals. In a mixed review, Patrick D. McDermott of The Fader called the visual "classic, kind of sad [Del Rey] in romantic black and white", but felt it was confusing and "on-brand...a meticulous homage to nothing in particular". While Nelson wrote that the clip failed to enhance the song, but was understated enough not to detract from the music.

== Live performances ==
Del Rey first previewed a verse of "West Coast" in a live performance at a show in Las Vegas on April 11, 2014. She then premiered the song live in a performance at the Coachella Valley Music and Arts Festival on April 13, 2014. She performed the song afront a natural backdrop of palm trees while donning a sundress, and during the rendition descended from the stage to kiss audience members. The performance resulted in Del Rey becoming the most-mentioned artist at Coachella on Twitter during the festival's first weekend. According to Keith Caulfield of Billboard, the song's reception at Coachella largely contributed to its debut of number 17 on the Billboard Hot 100. VH1's Meghan O'Keeffe said the rendition was met with rave reviews and that "the crowd ate it up". Lipshutz commented, "Del Rey's Coachella performance was so strong that [she] would have been forgiven if 'West Coast' proved to be a dud, but thankfully, the new single sounded like a winner when played live for the first time". On April 15, 2014, she performed the track as part of a once-off show at the Comerica Theatre in Phoenix, Arizona. According to Jim Louvau of the Phoenix New Times, Del Rey's rendition received a "great reception," while Ed Masley of The Arizona Republic called it "a sultry majesty".

"West Coast" also featured in Del Rey's set list for her 2014 worldwide concert tour. At the tour's stop in Nashville on May 2, 2014, her performance of the track was viewed by the Nashville Scene as a "fitting rendition that hinted at the good things possibly to come from her forthcoming album". Del Rey's performance of the track at a date at the House of Blues in Boston on May 6, 2014, was viewed by Reed as "loose, freewheeling sensuality as sun-kissed as the California lifestyle [the song] evokes". Her rendition of "West Coast" at a date in Aragon, Georgia on May 17, 2014, was deemed "a sensual declaration" by Bob Gendron of the Chicago Tribune. Her performance of the song at the PNE Amphitheatre in Toronto on May 25, 2014, was criticized by Francois Merchand of the Toronto Sun who wrote, "'West Coast' lacked tonal control, and this is where the weakness of Del Rey's movements (limited to hand gestures and soft hip sways) couldn't mask the singer's lacklustre delivery".

Del Rey performed "West Coast" wearing kohl-smudged eye makeup, a tie-dye sundress and hoop earrings, as part of her debut set list for the Glastonbury Festival 2014 on June 28. The rendition was accompanied by visuals from the song's music video as Del Rey's backdrop. Hutchinson described the performance as "actionless loveliness" and commended its "burbling guitars, hazy atmospherics, perfect cooing, [and] epic drums". Mark Savage of BBC News said the rendition was "suitably dramatic". At a date of her promotional tour, in Cork on July 15, 2014, Del Rey draped herself in the flag of Ireland during her performance of "West Coast". Del Rey also sang "West Coast" at the Austin City Limits Music Festival on October 4, 2014. The track was later reprised during her two-date gig at the Hollywood Forever Cemetery, beginning on October 17, 2014.

== Cover versions ==
Irish singer James Vincent McMorrow performed a "dreamy," high-pitched rendition of the track for Triple J on June 6, 2014. A remixed rendition of the track was released by American singer Travis Garland on July 10, 2014. Garland's version incorporated more sleek production with elements of trap. British band Royal Blood covered "West Coast" during their session for NPO 3FM on September 15, 2014. American duo Missio released a cover of the song on March 3, 2016.

== Formats and track listings ==
- Digital download
1. "West Coast" – 4:16
- Digital download – Remix EP
1. "West Coast" (Zhu Remix) – 4:24
2. "West Coast" (Ten Ven Remix) – 4:33
3. "West Coast" (The Grades Icon Mix) – 4:20
4. "West Coast" (MK Remix) – 5:26
- Digital download – Remixes
1. "West Coast" (Solomun Remix Dub) – 8:07
2. "West Coast" (Solomun Remix) – 8:07
- Digital download – The Remixes (France)
1. "West Coast" – 4:16
2. "West Coast" (Radio Mix) – 3:48
3. "West Coast" (The Young Professionals Minimal Remix) – 3:57
4. "West Coast" (Jabberwocky Remix) – 3:35
5. "West Coast" (Alle Farben Remix) – 7:08
6. "West Coast" (The Young Professionals Dark Remix) – 5:41
7. "West Coast" (Yavuz Ak & FevZee Remix) – 6:16
8. "West Coast" (The Grades Icon Mix) – 4:19
9. "West Coast" (Solomun Remix) – 8:09
- Digital download – The Remixes (Germany)
1. "West Coast" (Radio Mix) – 3:47
2. "West Coast" – 4:16
3. "West Coast" (Alle Farben Remix) – 7:05
4. "West Coast" (Yavuz Ak & FevZee Remix) – 6:16
5. "West Coast" (The Grades Icon Mix) – 4:17
6. "West Coast" (Solomun Remix) – 8:07
7. "West Coast" (The Young Professionals Minimal Remix) – 3:56
8. "West Coast" (Jabberwocky Remix) – 3:34
9. "West Coast" (The Young Professionals Dark Remix) – 5:39

== Credits and personnel ==
Recording locations

- Recorded at Easy Eye Sound, Nashville, Tennessee
- Strings recorded at The Bridge, Glendale, California

Personnel

- Lana Del Rey – songwriter, vocals, background vocals
- Dan Auerbach – electric guitar, production, shaker, 12-string acoustic guitar, synthesizer
- Collin Dupuis – engineering
- Nick Movshon – bass guitar, drums
- Rick Nowels – songwriter
- Maximilian Weissenfeldt – drums

Credits and personnel adapted from the Ultraviolence album liner notes.

== Charts ==
=== Weekly charts ===
Chart (2014)	Peak position
Australia (ARIA)	44
Belgium (Ultratip Bubbling Under Flanders)	4
Belgium (Ultratop 50 Wallonia)	47
Canada Hot 100 (Billboard)	26
CIS Airplay (TopHit)	148
Denmark (Tracklisten)	39
Finland Download (Latauslista)	21
France (SNEP)	34
Germany (GfK)	22
Greece Digital Songs (Billboard)	3
Hungary (Single Top 40)	13
Ireland (IRMA)	31
Israel (Media Forest)	5
Italy (FIMI)	18
New Zealand (Recorded Music NZ)	31
Scottish Singles Sales (Official Charts)	18
Slovakia Singles Digital (ČNS IFPI)	89
Spain (Promusicae)	12
Switzerland (Schweizer Hitparade)	13
UK Singles (Official Charts)	21
US Billboard Hot 100	17
US Rock & Alternative Airplay (Billboard)	26
US Alternative Airplay (Billboard)	29
US Adult Alternative Airplay (Billboard)	3

2023 weekly chart performance for "West Coast"
Chart (2023)	Peak position
Greece International (IFPI)	62

2026 weekly chart performance for "West Coast"
Chart (2026)	Peak position
Russia Streaming (TopHit)	100

=== Year-end charts ===
Chart (2014)	Position
France (SNEP)	183

== Certifications ==
Certifications for "West Coast"
Region	Certification	Certified units/sales
Australia (ARIA)	2× Platinum	140,000^{‡}
Austria (IFPI Austria)	Platinum	30,000^{*}
Denmark (IFPI Danmark)	Gold	45,000^{‡}
Germany (BVMI)	Gold	300,000^{‡}
Italy (FIMI)	Gold	50,000^{‡}
New Zealand (RMNZ)	2× Platinum	60,000^{‡}
Spain (Promusicae)	Gold	30,000^{‡}
United Kingdom (BPI)	Platinum	600,000^{‡}
United States (RIAA)	Platinum	1,000,000^{‡}
Streaming
Greece (IFPI Greece)	Platinum	2,000,000^{†}
^{*} Sales figures based on certification alone.^{‡} Sales+streaming figures based on certification alone.^{†} Streaming-only figures based on certification alone.

== Release history ==
Country	Date	Format	Label	Ref.
Italy	April 14, 2014	Contemporary hit radio	Polydor	
Canada	April 22, 2014	Digital download	Interscope	
United States	April 22, 2014	Digital download	Interscope	
Belgium	April 23, 2014	Digital download	Universal Music Group	
France	April 23, 2014	Digital download	Universal Music Group	
Finland	April 23, 2014	Digital download	Universal Music Group	
Luxembourg	April 23, 2014	Digital download	Universal Music Group	
New Zealand	April 23, 2014	Digital download	Universal Music Group	
Netherlands	April 23, 2014	Digital download	Universal Music Group	
Portugal	April 23, 2014	Digital download	Universal Music Group	
Spain	April 23, 2014	Digital download	Universal Music Group	
Sweden	April 23, 2014	Digital download	Universal Music Group	
United Kingdom	May 25, 2014	Digital download	Polydor	
Germany	May 30, 2014	Digital download	Vertigo; Capitol	
United States	June 3, 2014	Modern rock	Interscope	
United States	July 13, 2014	Digital download – Remix EP	Interscope	
United States	October 29, 2014	Digital download – Remixes	Interscope	
