= Ultraviolence (album) =

Studio album by Lana Del Rey
- Released: June 13, 2014
- Recorded: 2013–2014
- Studios: Easy Eye Sound (Nashville); The Bridge (Glendale, California); Electric Lady (New York City); Echo (Los Angeles); The Church (London); The Green Building (Santa Monica, California); Nightbird Studios (LA)
- Genres: Psychedelic rock; desert rock; dream pop; slowcore
- Length: 51:24
- Labels: Polydor; Interscope
- Producers: Dan Auerbach; Lana Del Rey; Paul Epworth; Lee Foster; Daniel Heath; Greg Kurstin; Blake Stranathan

Lana Del Rey chronology
Tropico (2013)	Ultraviolence (2014)	Honeymoon (2015)

Singles from Ultraviolence
- 1. "West Coast" Released: April 14, 2014; 2. "Shades of Cool" Released: May 26, 2014; 3. "Ultraviolence" Released: June 4, 2014; 4. "Brooklyn Baby" Released: June 8, 2014

Ultraviolence is the third studio album by American singer-songwriter Lana Del Rey. It was released on June 13, 2014 by Polydor and Interscope Records. Originally dismissing the possibility of releasing another record after her major-label debut Born to Die (2012), Del Rey began planning its follow-up in 2013. Production continued into 2014, at which time she enlisted Dan Auerbach to revamp what she initially considered to be the completed record. The album saw additional contributions from producers such as Paul Epworth, Greg Kurstin, Daniel Heath, and Rick Nowels. Marking a significant departure from the trip-hop stylings of Born to Die, it features a more guitar-based sound and raw vocals, resulting in a primarily psychedelic rock style with elements of dream pop, desert rock, and slowcore. (Note: Numerous critics remarked the album's basis in guitar instrumentation, which was a noted difference from Born to Die, which featured a trip hop-inspired sound.)

Ultraviolence received positive reviews, with reviewers praising the album's lyricism, cohesiveness, production and Del Rey's vocal performance. The album was frequently ranked by various publications as among the best albums of the year as well as the decade, with Metacritic citing it as the 13th-most frequently mentioned album in critics "year-end" lists in 2014. Ultraviolence became a global success, debuting at number one in eleven countries, including the United States with first-week sales of 182,000 copies, becoming the best-selling debut week of Del Rey's career and reached the top five in over twenty territories.

To promote the album, four singles were released, "West Coast", "Shades of Cool", "Ultraviolence" and "Brooklyn Baby". In May 2015, Del Rey embarked on The Endless Summer Tour featuring live shows with singers Courtney Love and Grimes, to support the album. It started on May 7, 2015, and ended on June 16, 2015.

== Background and production ==
After the release of Born to Die in 2012, Del Rey dismissed the idea of releasing another album, because she had "already said everything [she] wanted to say." However, by February 2013, Del Rey had started work on an album saying, "It's a little more stripped down but still cinematic and dark. I've been working on it really slowly but I love everything I've done. I've been writing in Santa Monica and I know what the record sounds like. Now I just have to finish it. Musically I've worked with the same three guys". She mentioned that one of the songs off the album would be called "Black Beauty". When the demo version leaked in July, Del Rey stated "I do feel discouraged, yeah. I don't really know what to put on the record. But I guess I could just put them on and see what happens. Each time I write... I'll never write a song if I don't think it's going to be perfect for the record." She also stated that she was writing "low-key and stripped back" songs and was working with Dan Heath, her then boyfriend Barrie-James O'Neill and that she wanted to work with Lou Reed.

In October, Del Rey said about the prospect of a new album: "When people ask me about it, I just have to be honest—I really don't know. I don't want to say, 'Yeah, definitely—the next one's better than this one', because I don't really hear a next one. My muse is very fickle. She only comes to me sometimes, which is annoying."

By January 2014, Del Rey and Dan Auerbach were rumored to be working together at Auerbach's Easy Eye Sound recording studio in Nashville, Tennessee, and he was said to be producing her upcoming album.

Del Rey and Auerbach were initially scheduled to work together for three days but ended up spending six weeks recording a full album. On February 20, Del Rey posted a picture of herself and Auerbach on Twitter with the caption: "Me and Dan Auerbach are excited to present you Ultraviolence."

On Del Rey's work in the studio, Auerbach noted, “Every criticism that I’d ever heard about her was proven wrong when I was in the studio with her...From how great the songs were to how confident she is as a musician to her fucking singing every song live, with a handheld microphone and a seven-piece band."

About working with Del Rey, Auerbach later said: "She impressed me every day. There were moments when she was fighting me. I could sense that maybe she didn't want to have anybody think she wasn't in control because I'm sure it's really hard to be a woman in the music business. So we bumped heads a little bit, but at the end of the day we were dancing to the songs". The artist stated that the album draws inspiration from the West Coast, as well as from Brooklyn, New York. In addition, it also features heavy guitars and jazz tones. Del Rey also stated that the inclusion of Auerbach was last-minute; the two had met in New York City when she believed that the record was finished. She characterized their time in the studio as having the opportunity to "do what we wanted to do."

On the release of Ultraviolence, she reaffirmed her earlier reluctance to make another album, saying, "I mean, I still feel that way, but with this album I felt less like I had to chronicle my journeys and more like I could just recount snippets in my recent past that felt exhilarating to me".

== Content ==
There's not a running theme through Ultraviolence, it's more atmospheric. There's more of a general vibe going on. I feel like it has a narrative; it starts with my favorite song from the record, called 'Cruel World,' with these heavy guitars and I like that because it's symbolically referencing the West Coast, and from there we move into parts of Brooklyn, sonically.

— Del Rey on the album's cohesion, 2014

The sound of Ultraviolence was characterized as dream pop, psychedelic rock, desert rock and slowcore with some elements of blues rock, soft rock and indie rock.

The first song on the album, "Cruel World", is the longest song on the album, clocking in at six minutes and thirty-nine seconds. A break-up song, with 70s-style rock guitars and reverb, Del Rey considers this as her favorite track off the album.

In the title track, "Ultraviolence", Del Rey directly references the Crystals's "He Hit Me (And It Felt Like a Kiss)" in the chorus, which she had also heard a rendition of by Hole. "Shades of Cool" was described by Consequence of Sound as "a slow and slightly gloomy ballad marked by reverberated guitars, slight atmospherics, and Del Rey's vocals that alternate between a hushed whisper and ephemeral wailing". The song consists of "a chiming guitar, slow-burn bass line, and swelling orchestra" which surround Del Rey's vocals. Del Rey said that she wrote "Brooklyn Baby" with Lou Reed in mind. She was supposed to work with him and flew to New York City to meet him, but he died the day she arrived. He is referenced in the line "Well, my boyfriend's in a band/He plays guitar while I sing Lou Reed".

"West Coast" is a mid-tempo song with a psychedelic rock and soft rock verse and a surf rock slow-tempo chorus. Musically, its composition is built around reggae drum fills, blues-influenced guitar riffs, and draws influences from indie rock music.

"Sad Girl" was written about being "the other woman" in an affair. Del Rey wrote "Money Power Glory" as a reaction to her rise to fame. About writing it, she says, "I was in more of a sardonic mood. Like, if all that I was actually going to be allowed to have by the media was money, loads of money, then fuck it... What I actually wanted was something quiet and simple: a writer's community and respect."

"Fucked My Way Up to the Top" was written about an undisclosed female singer who, at first, mocked her for her supposedly unauthentic style, but then "stole and copied it" and became successful with it. Asked about the meaning of the song, Del Rey said, "It's commentary, like, 'I know what you think of me', and I'm alluding to that. You know, I have slept with a lot of guys in the industry, but none of them helped me get my record deals. Which is annoying."

== Release and promotion ==
During the premiere of her short film Tropico on December 4, 2013, Del Rey explained to the audience that "I really just wanted us all to be together so I could try and visually close out my chapter [of her second studio album Born to Die and third extended play Paradise] before I release the new record, Ultraviolence". Journalists identified the phrase from Anthony Burgess's dystopian novella A Clockwork Orange (1962), although initial reports were conflicting as to whether or not the title would be stylized as the one-word "Ultraviolence" or two-word "Ultra Violence". In February 2014, she mentioned the possibility of releasing the record on May 1, although during her concert in Montreal on May 5 stated that the project would be released the following month.

On May 8, Del Rey announced the track listings for the 11-track standard version and 14-track deluxe version of Ultraviolence. Its black-and-white album artwork, shot by photographer Neil Krug, depicts Del Rey dressed in a sheer white T-shirt and a white strapless bra while leaning against her Mercedes-Benz 380SL; the title "Ultraviolence" is positioned beneath her image in an all-capitalized typeface, similar to the covers for Born to Die and Paradise. The artwork was unveiled on May 14, along with the confirmation that the record itself would be released on June 17 in the United States. It was made available through the traditional CD, digital download, and vinyl formats, and was additionally distributed in a multi-piece box set; it covers the title "Ultraviolence" in black foil, includes the deluxe record on compact disc and on a two-piece vinyl collection, and is packaged with four photo art cards. Clothing retailer Urban Outfitters offers an exclusive vinyl version of the standard version of Ultraviolence, and features an alternate cover which depicts a close-up of Del Rey's knee in torn jeans as she holds a loose strand of fabric from the torn denim.

Del Rey premiered "West Coast" as part of her set at the Coachella Music Festival on April 13, 2014. "West Coast" was serviced as Ultraviolence's lead single the next day. Its music video was released on May 7 and directed by Vincent Haycock. "Shades of Cool" was released as the second single on May 26. A music video was directed by Jake Nava and released on June 17. The third single and title track, "Ultraviolence", was released on June 4 and was followed by the fourth single, "Brooklyn Baby", four days later. The German release of a remixes extended play for "Black Beauty" by Vertigo Berlin was announced for November 21, 2014.

Prior to the album release, Del Rey announced a North American concert tour, as well as performances at several European festivals. Del Rey received attention for taking a "less is more" approach to promoting the album. She did not promote the album with television performances or interviews, instead relying on a couple of print interviews, music videos, and social media. In September, she first cancelled two private concerts for Virgin Radio in Paris, and then the remaining dates of her European tour for medical reasons. Del Rey resumed her tour in the beginning of October with a set at the Austin City Limits Music Festival and headlined gigs in Mexico City and Monterrey between October 6 and 9 and at the Hollywood Forever Cemetery on October 17 and 18. Del Rey announced her 2015 Endless Summer Tour on December 1, 2014, which she headlined with punk vocalist Courtney Love, former frontwoman of alternative rock band Hole. Del Rey released the "Ultraviolence" music video, produced by then boyfriend Francesco Carrozzini, in August 2014.

== Critical reception ==
Professional ratings
Aggregate scores
Source	Rating
AnyDecentMusic?	7.2/10
Metacritic	74/100
Review scores
Source	Rating
AllMusic	4/5 stars
Billboard	4/5 stars
The Daily Telegraph	3/5 stars
Entertainment Weekly	A
The Guardian	4/5 stars
Los Angeles Times	3/4 stars
NME	6/10
Pitchfork	7.1/10
Rolling Stone	3.5/5 stars
Spin	8/10

Ultraviolence received a positive critical response following its release. According to review aggregator Metacritic, which assigns a normalized rating out of 100 to reviews from mainstream critics, the album has an average score of 74 out of 100 based on 35 reviews, indicating "generally favorable reviews".

The Guardian writer Alexis Petridis wrote that "Every chorus clicks, the melodies are uniformly beautiful, and they soar and swoop, the better to demonstrate Del Rey's increased confidence in her voice. It's all so well done that the fact that the whole album proceeds at the same, somnambulant pace scarcely matters." Tony Clayton-Lea of The Irish Times noted, "What seems certain is that whatever she really is, or whatever she does in her chosen milieu, Del Ray [sic] is the best at it." Mike Diver for Clash commented, "For all its lows-inspired highs, Ultraviolence is not quite the complete picture. It goes so far as to reflect, albeit perhaps coincidentally, this era: black and white, the colour has to come from the performance, not the film it's captured on." The critic deemed the album "A bruised beauty, just short of classic status...". Pitchfork's Mark Richardson said that Ultraviolence was a concept album "from a Concept Human", referring to Del Rey's assumed persona. He felt that the album was "gorgeous and rich", and much more cohesive than the earlier Born to Die. At The Independent the album scored 3 out of 5 and critic Hugh Montgomery felt, "Ultraviolence is more of the same, but less. There is quasi-transgressive mixture of hopeless passivity and coquettish sexuality running through songs."

=== Year-end lists ===
Critic/Publication	List	Rank	Ref.
Entertainment Weekly	10 Best Albums of 2014	4	
Ken Tucker from NPR	Top 9 Albums of 2014	4	
Billboard	The 14 Best Pop Albums of 2014	14	
James Reed from The Boston Globe	Best Albums of 2014	1	
Cosmopolitan	20 Best Albums of 2014	7	
Digital Spy	Top 15 Albums of 2014	14	
NME	NME's Top 50 Albums of 2014	25	
Rolling Stone	50 Best Albums of 2014	7	
Rolling Stone	20 Best Pop Albums of 2014	3	
Slant Magazine	The 25 Best Albums of 2014	3	
Spin	The 20 Best Pop Albums of 2014	5	
Time	Top 10 Best Albums of 2014	5	

According to Metacritic, Ultraviolence was the 13th-most frequently mentioned album in critics' "year-end" lists in 2014.

=== Decade-end lists ===
Critic/Publication	List	Rank	Ref.
Consequence of Sound	The Top 25 Pop Albums of the 2010s	8	
Consequence of Sound	The Top 100 Albums of the 2010s	37	
Cracked	The Top 100 Albums of the Decade	11	
NME	Greatest Albums of the 2010s	70	
Rolling Stone	100 Best Albums of the 2010s	99	

== Commercial performance ==
On June 18, 2014, Billboard estimated that Ultraviolence would sell approximately 175,000–180,000 copies during the first week of its release in the United States. The album debuted at number one on the Billboard 200, with sales of 182,000, making it Del Rey's first number-one album in the US and responsible for a career-best sales week. After two weeks, Ultraviolence sold over 220,000 copies in the US; at the time of release, it held the record for the largest album sales debut by a female artist in 2014, until was overtaken by Taylor Swift's 1989 in November. The album went on to sell over 31,800 vinyl copies in the US, making it the eighth best-selling vinyl album in the US in 2014. Overall, Ultraviolence debuted at number one in 12 countries, including the United Kingdom, making it her second consecutive number-one album, following Born to Die. Ultraviolence was certified gold in Canada on June 25, 2014. The album sold over 356,000 copies worldwide in its first week, and 1 million copies worldwide within a month of release. In August 2014, the album was certified gold in both the UK and Australia. In November 2021, the album was certified Platinum in the US for shipments of over 1 million units. In December 2022, the album was certified platinum in the UK for selling over 300,000 units.

== Legacy ==
Ultraviolence is widely considered a "cult-classic" in alternative music, and is regularly cited as one of the most influential alternative pop albums of the 2010s. Kyle Anderson of Entertainment Weekly wrote about Del Rey's musical aesthetic on the album, stating, "Kubrick would have loved Del Rey—a highly stylized vixen who romanticizes fatalism to near-pornographic levels, creating fantastically decadent moments of film-noir melodrama. It's an aesthetic that demands total commitment from both artist and listener, and it would be difficult to buy into if she didn't deliver such fully realized cinema". He also added, "Ultraviolence masterfully melds those elements, and completes the redemption narrative of a singer whose breakout-to-backlash arc on 2012's Born to Die made her a cautionary tale of music-industry hype". Caryn Ganz for Rolling Stone gave a positive review, commenting the album "is a melancholy crawl through doomed romance, incorrigible addictions, blown American dreams," although she also wrote " [it] wraps desire, violence and sadness into a tight bundle that Del Rey doesn't always seem sure how to unpack". Rolling Stone named it the seventh best album of 2014 and third best pop album in its annual compilations, later commenting: "Ultraviolence qualifies as a radical statement from a pop star in 2014 – it's mostly produced by Black Keys frontman Dan Auerbach, who relies on electric guitar and other live instruments, and none of its eleven tracks sound much like a potential radio hit." Justin Charity of Complex magazine noted, "Ultraviolence is a blues affair, with moody innuendo spilling bloody and bold as the opening sequence to a vintage Bond saga". The critic also called it 'intimate', 'drunk driven'. Alexandra Molotkow, writing in The Globe and Mail, praised the album as "more vivid, nuanced and ripe than [her debut], Born to Die."

== Track listing ==
Ultraviolence – Standard edition
No.	Title	Writer(s)	Producer(s)	Length
1.	"Cruel World"	Elizabeth Grant; Blake Stranathan	Dan Auerbach	6:39
2.	"Ultraviolence"	Grant; Daniel Heath	Auerbach	4:11
3.	"Shades of Cool"	Grant; Rick Nowels	Auerbach	5:42
4.	"Brooklyn Baby"	Grant; Barrie O'Neill	Auerbach	5:51
5.	"West Coast"	Grant; Nowels	Auerbach	4:16
6.	"Sad Girl"	Grant; Nowels	Auerbach; Nowels^{[a]}	5:17
7.	"Pretty When You Cry"	Grant; Stranathan	Lana Del Rey; Stranathan; Lee Foster	3:54
8.	"Money Power Glory"	Grant; Greg Kurstin	Kurstin	4:30
9.	"Fucked My Way Up to the Top"	Grant; Heath	Auerbach	3:32
10.	"Old Money"	Grant; Heath; Robbie Fitzsimmons	Heath	4:31
11.	"The Other Woman"	Jessie Mae Robinson	Auerbach	3:01
Total length:				51:24

Ultraviolence – Austrian, German, and Swiss edition (bonus track)
No.	Title	Writer(s)	Producer(s)	Length
12.	"West Coast" (radio mix)	Grant; Nowels	Nowels	3:47
Total length:				55:11

Ultraviolence – Deluxe edition (bonus tracks)
No.	Title	Writer(s)	Producer(s)	Length
12.	"Black Beauty"	Grant; Nowels	Paul Epworth; Nowels^{[a]}	5:14
13.	"Guns and Roses"	Grant; Nowels	Grant; Nowels; Foster	4:30
14.	"Florida Kilos"	Grant; Auerbach; Harmony Korine	Auerbach	4:14
Total length:				65:22

Ultraviolence – iTunes Store edition (bonus track)
No.	Title	Writer(s)	Length
15.	"Is This Happiness"	Grant; Nowels	3:44
Total length:			69:06

Ultraviolence – Japanese and Target edition (bonus track)
No.	Title	Writer(s)	Length
15.	"Flipside"	Grant; Stranathan	5:10
Total length:			70:32

Ultraviolence – Fnac edition (bonus disc)
No.	Title	Length
1.	"Flipside"	5:11
Total length:		5:11

Ultraviolence – Japanese iTunes Store edition (bonus tracks)
No.	Title	Length
15.	"Is This Happiness"	3:44
16.	"Flipside"	5:10
Total length:		74:16

Sample credits

- "Ultraviolence" interpolates elements of "He Hit Me (And It Felt Like a Kiss)" by The Crystals.
- "Old Money" interpolates "What Is a Youth?" composed by Nino Rota and performed by Glen Weston from the album Romeo & Juliet: The Soundtrack.

Notes

- ^{^[a]} signifies a vocal producer

== Personnel ==
Credits are adapted from the liner notes of Ultraviolence.

Performance credits

- Lana Del Rey – vocals (all tracks); background vocals (tracks 2, 5)
- Dan Auerbach – background vocals (track 14)
- Seth Kauffman – background vocals (tracks 4, 14)
- Alfreda McCrary Lee – background vocals (track 2)
- Ann McCrary – background vocals (track 2)
- Regina McCrary – background vocals (track 2)

Musicians

- Dan Auerbach – claps (track 1); electric guitar (tracks 1, 2, 3, 4, 5, 6, 9, 14); shaker, 12–string acoustic guitar (track 5); synthesizer (tracks 5, 6, 11, 14)
- Collin Dupuis – drum programming (tracks 2, 3, 9, 14); synthesizer (track 6)
- Brian Griffin – drums (tracks 7, 13)
- Ed Harcourt – piano (track 12)
- Tom Herbert – bass guitar (track 12)
- Seth Kauffman – synthesizer, claps (track 1); electric guitar (tracks 2, 4, 6, 9); omnichord (track 3); percussion (track 4)
- Nikolaj Torp Larsen – philicorda, mellotron (track 12)
- Leon Michaels – claps (track 1); synthesizer (tracks 1, 2, 9, 11, 14); piano (tracks 2, 9); mellotron (tracks 1, 2, 3, 4, 6, 9, 11, 14); tambourine, percussion, tenor saxophone (track 4, 11)
- Nick Movshon – claps (track 1); bass guitar (tracks 1, 2, 3, 5, 9); upright bass (track 4); drums (tracks 4, 5, 6, 11, 14)
- Rick Nowels – piano (track 12)
- Russ Pahl – pedal steel guitar (tracks 1, 2, 4, 9, 11); electric guitar (tracks 3, 14); acoustic guitar (tracks 4, 6)
- Blake Stranathan – guitar (tracks 7, 13)
- Pablo Tato – guitar (track 12)
- Leo Taylor – drums (track 12)
- Kenny Vaughan – electric guitar (tracks 1, 2, 3, 9, 11); acoustic guitar (track 4); synthesizer, mellotron (track 6)
- Maximilian Weissenfeldt – claps (track 1); drums (tracks 1, 2, 3, 4, 5, 9)

Technical and production

- Dan Auerbach – production (tracks 1, 2, 3, 4, 5, 6, 9, 11, 14); mixing (tracks 2, 14)
- Julian Burg – additional engineering (track 8)
- Vira Byramji – assistant engineer (track 13)
- John Davis – mastering (all tracks)
- Lana Del Rey – production (tracks 7, 13, 15)
- Collin Dupuis – engineering (tracks 1, 2, 3, 4, 5, 6, 9, 11, 14); mixing (tracks 2, 14)
- Paul Epworth – production (track 12)
- Lee Foster – production (tracks 7, 13)
- Milton Gutiérrez – engineering (track 10)
- Daniel Heath – production, arrangement (track 10)
- Phil Joly – engineering (track 7); tracking engineer, mixing (track 13)
- Greg Kurstin – production, mixing (track 8)
- Neil Krug – photography
- Mat Maitland – design
- Matthew McGaughey – orchestration (track 10)
- Kieron Menzies – vocal engineering (tracks 6, 12)
- Rick Nowels – vocal production (tracks 6, 12); production (track 13)
- Alex Pasco – additional engineering (track 8)
- Robert Orton – mixing (tracks 1, 3, 4, 6, 7, 9, 10, 11, 12)
- Myan Soffia – additional photography
- Blake Stranathan – production (track 6, 7, 15)
- Matt Wiggins – engineering (track 12)
- Andy Zisakis – assistant engineer (track 10)

== Charts ==
=== Weekly charts ===
Chart (2014)	Peak position
Argentine Albums (CAPIF)	4
Australian Albums (ARIA)	1
Austrian Albums (Ö3 Austria)	5
Belgian Albums (Ultratop Flanders)	1
Belgian Albums (Ultratop Wallonia)	1
Brazil Albums (ABPD)	3
Canadian Albums (Billboard)	1
Chinese Albums (Sino Chart)	4
Croatian International Albums (HDU)	7
Czech Albums (ČNS IFPI)	4
Danish Albums (Hitlisten)	1
Dutch Albums (Album Top 100)	5
Finnish Albums (Suomen virallinen lista)	1
French Albums (SNEP)	2
German Albums (Offizielle Top 100)	3
Hungarian Albums (MAHASZ)	6
Irish Albums (IRMA)	2
Italian Albums (FIMI)	2
Japanese Albums (Oricon)	50
New Zealand Albums (RMNZ)	1
Norwegian Albums (VG-lista)	1
Polish Albums (ZPAV)	1
Portuguese Albums (AFP)	3
Scottish Albums (Official Charts)	1
South Korean Albums (Circle)	28
Spanish Albums (Promusicae)	1
Swedish Albums (Sverigetopplistan)	6
Swiss Albums (Schweizer Hitparade)	2
UK Albums (Official Charts)	1
US Billboard 200	1
US Digital Albums (Billboard)	2
US Indie Store Album Sales (Billboard)	1
US Vinyl Albums (Billboard)	2

2024 weekly chart performance for Ultraviolence
Chart (2024)	Peak position
Croatian International Albums (HDU)	4

=== Year-end charts ===
Chart (2014)	Position
Australian Albums (ARIA)	31
Belgium (Ultratop Flanders)	47
Belgium (Ultratop Wallonia)	26
Canadian Albums (Billboard)	27
French Albums (SNEP)	64
Germany (Offizielle Top 100)	49
Italian Albums (FIMI)	58
Mexican Albums (AMPROFON)	34
New Zealand (Recorded Music NZ)	33
Polish Albums (ZPAV)	23
Swedish Albums (Sverigetopplistan)	97
Swiss Albums (Swiss Hitparade)	16
UK Albums (OCC)	53
US Billboard 200	43

Chart (2015)	Position
US Billboard 200	184

Chart (2022)	Position
Lithuanian Albums (AGATA)	47
Polish Albums (ZPAV)	84

Chart (2023)	Position
Belgian Albums (Ultratop Flanders)	107
Belgian Albums (Ultratop Wallonia)	177

Chart (2024)	Position
Belgian Albums (Ultratop Flanders)	90
Belgian Albums (Ultratop Wallonia)	158
Croatian International Albums (HDU)	28
Polish Albums (ZPAV)	80

Chart (2025)	Position
Belgian Albums (Ultratop Flanders)	119
Belgian Albums (Ultratop Wallonia)	150
Polish Albums (ZPAV)	89

== Certifications ==
Region	Certification	Certified units/sales
Australia (ARIA)	Platinum	70,000^{‡}
Austria (IFPI Austria)	Platinum	15,000^{*}
Brazil (Pro-Música Brasil)	Gold	20,000^{*}
Canada (Music Canada)	2× Platinum	160,000^{‡}
Denmark (IFPI Danmark)	Platinum	20,000^{‡}
France (SNEP)	Platinum	100,000^{*}
Germany (BVMI)	Gold	100,000^{‡}
Italy (FIMI)	Platinum	50,000^{‡}
Mexico (AMPROFON)	Gold	30,000^{^}
New Zealand (RMNZ)	2× Platinum	30,000^{‡}
Poland (ZPAV)	Platinum	20,000^{*}
Portugal (AFP)	Gold	3,500^{‡}
United Kingdom (BPI)	Platinum	300,000^{‡}
United States (RIAA)	Platinum	1,000,000^{‡}
^{*} Sales figures based on certification alone.^{^} Shipments figures based on certification alone.^{‡} Sales+streaming figures based on certification alone.

== Release history ==
Country	Date	Edition	Format(s)	Label
Germany	June 13, 2014	Standard; deluxe; super deluxe	CD; LP; digital download	Universal Music
Netherlands	June 13, 2014	Standard; deluxe	CD; LP; digital download	Polydor
Switzerland	June 13, 2014	Standard; deluxe	CD; LP; digital download	Universal Music
France	June 16, 2014	Standard; deluxe; super deluxe	CD; LP; digital download	Universal Music
United Kingdom	June 16, 2014	Standard; deluxe	CD; LP; digital download	Polydor
Italy	June 16, 2014	Standard; deluxe; super deluxe	CD; LP; digital download	Polydor
Canada	June 17, 2014	Standard; deluxe	CD; LP; digital download	Universal Music
Mexico	June 17, 2014	Deluxe	CD; digital download	Interscope
Spain	June 17, 2014	Standard; deluxe; super deluxe	CD; LP; digital download	Universal Music
United States	June 17, 2014	Standard; deluxe	CD; LP; digital download	Interscope
Japan	June 18, 2014	Standard; deluxe	CD; LP; digital download	Interscope
China	August 28, 2014	Deluxe	CD	Universal Music China

== See also ==
- List of Billboard 200 number-one albums of 2014
