= Shades of Cool =

Single by Lana Del Rey

from the album Ultraviolence
- Released: May 26, 2014
- Studio: Easy Eye Sound (Nashville)
- Genre: Blues rock; psychedelic rock
- Length: 5:42
- Label: Interscope
- Songwriters: Lana Del Rey; Rick Nowels
- Producer: Dan Auerbach

Lana Del Rey singles chronology
"West Coast" (2014)	"Shades of Cool" (2014)	"Ultraviolence" (2014)

Music video
- "Shades of Cool" on YouTube

"Shades of Cool" is a song by American singer-songwriter Lana Del Rey from her third studio album, Ultraviolence (2014). She and Rick Nowels wrote the track, which was produced by Dan Auerbach. It was released on May 26, 2014, by Interscope Records as the second single from Ultraviolence. Lyrically, the single talks about an "unfixable" man.

"Shades of Cool" received general acclaim from music critics, who praised its musical style. Commercially, the single peaked at number 79 on the US Billboard Hot 100 and entered the top 40 of a few record charts in Europe. A music video for "Shades of Cool" was directed by Jake Nava and was described as a film noir visual.

== Composition ==
"Shades of Cool"
A 30-second sample of "Shades of Cool", which is a song instrumented by guitar

"Shades of Cool" was written by Del Rey and Rick Nowels, and produced by Dan Auerbach. Composed in the key of D minor, the song runs at a moderate slow tempo of 46 beats per minute. It was described as a waltz instrumented by "slow-burn" bassline, guitar, and string instruments; the track features a guitar solo delivered by Auerbach. Del Rey's vocals span from A_{3} to B_{5}. Her "operatic" soprano vocals blending with "trademark wailing vibrato" create a ghostly atmosphere on "Shades of Cool". Chris Coplan from Consequence of Sound described the song as "a slow and slightly gloomy ballad." Meanwhile, "Shades of Cool" was characterized as a "seeping, atmospheric" ballad that contrasts the more "pop-savvy swaggering 'West Coast'" by Billboard's Colin Stutz. On the single, Del Rey sings about an "unfixable" man: "But you are unfixable / I can’t break through your world / ‘Cause you live in shades of cool / Your heart is unbreakable."

== Reception ==
"Shades of Cool" received positive reviews from music critics. Coplan of Consequence of Sound complimented the song for its "grace and sophistication". Saran Shetty of Slate called "Shades of Cool" "a beautiful, brooding return to form [for Del Rey]", and opined that the single would "fit perfectly" in a James Bond theme track. Likewise, Rolling Stone's Calyn Ganz wrote that the track "would be perfect for a James Bond film directed by Quentin Tarantino." Lathan Ryan from PopMatters positively compared Del Rey's vocals on "Shades of Cool" to those of Cocteau Twins vocalist Elizabeth Fraser, observing that "Del Rey has never sounded better".

The single peaked at number 79 on the US Billboard Hot 100. It managed to enter the top 40 of a few record charts: Belgian Wallonia (number 40), France (number 37), Hungary (number 19), and Spain (number 31). The single peaked at number three on the Greece Digital Songs, a chart operated by Billboard magazine.

== Music video ==
The music video for "Shades of Cool" was directed by Jake Nava and was released on June 17, 2014. The video features tattoo artist Mark Mahoney, who also appeared in the music video for "West Coast", as Del Rey's love interest. Filmed in Los Angeles, California, the clip is a "romantic" visual depicting the streets of Los Angeles at night, a 1970s-themed neighborhood, and a pool. In the video, Del Rey dances for her love interest in "flowing" dresses. An alternative version of the visual for "Shades of Cool", which was also directed by Nava, was released in July 2014. This version, in which Del Rey is seen drowned in a pool, was described as "darker" than the original video.

== Track listing ==
Digital download

1. "Shades of Cool" – 5:42

== Credits and personnel ==
Credits adapted from the liner notes of Ultraviolence.

Performance credits

- Lana Del Rey – vocals

Instruments

- Dan Auerbach – electric guitar
- Collin Dupuis – drum programming
- Seth Kaufman – omnichord
- Leon Michels – mellotron
- Nick Movshon – bass guitar
- Russ Pahl – electric guitar
- Kenny Vaughan – electric guitar
- Maximilian Weissenfeldt – drums

Technical and production

- Dan Auerbach – production
- John Davis – mastering
- Collin Dupuis – engineering
- Robert Orton – mixing

== Charts ==
Chart (2014)	Peak position
Australia (ARIA)	50
Belgium (Ultratop 50 Wallonia)	40
Canada Hot 100 (Billboard)	52
Czech Republic Singles Digital (ČNS IFPI)	79
Greece Digital Songs (Billboard)	3
France (SNEP)	37
Hungary (Single Top 40)	19
Italy (FIMI)	35
Spain (Promusicae)	31
Switzerland (Schweizer Hitparade)	43
US Billboard Hot 100	79

== Certifications ==
Certifications for "Shades of Cool"
Region	Certification	Certified units/sales
Australia (ARIA)	Gold	35,000^{‡}
Brazil (Pro-Música Brasil)	Platinum	60,000^{‡}
United Kingdom (BPI)	Silver	200,000^{‡}
United States (RIAA)	Gold	500,000^{‡}
^{‡} Sales+streaming figures based on certification alone.

== Release history ==
Country	Date	Format	Label
Belgium	May 26, 2014	Digital download	Universal Music Group
France	May 26, 2014	Digital download	Universal Music Group
Luxembourg	May 26, 2014	Digital download	Universal Music Group
Portugal	May 26, 2014	Digital download	Universal Music Group
Spain	May 26, 2014	Digital download	Universal Music Group
Switzerland	May 26, 2014	Digital download	Universal Music Group
United States	May 26, 2014	Digital download	Interscope Records
