= Ultraviolence (song) =

Single by Lana Del Rey

from the album Ultraviolence
- Released: June 4, 2014
- Studio: Easy Eye Sound (Nashville)
- Genre: Rock
- Length: 4:11
- Label: Interscope; Polydor
- Songwriters: Lana Del Rey; Daniel Heath
- Producer: Dan Auerbach

Lana Del Rey singles chronology
"Shades of Cool" (2014)	"Ultraviolence" (2014)	"Brooklyn Baby" (2014)

Music video
- "Ultraviolence" on YouTube

"Ultraviolence" is a song recorded by American singer and songwriter Lana Del Rey for her third studio album of the same name (2014). It was co-written by Del Rey and Daniel Heath, and produced by Dan Auerbach. The song was released on June 4, 2014, by Polydor and Interscope Records, as the third single from Ultraviolence. A music video, directed by Francesco Carrozzini, was released on July 30, 2014.

== Composition ==
"Ultraviolence"
A sample of the chorus on the rock ballad "Ultraviolence", where Del Rey sings about her abusive relationship with reference to The Crystals' "He Hit Me (And It Felt Like a Kiss)" (1962)

According to Brenna Ehrlich of MTV News, "Ultraviolence" tells the story of a "typical Lana Del Rey romantic relationship: broken, failed and painful". In the line "I can hear sirens sirens, he hit me and it felt like a kiss," Del Rey references the 1962 The Crystals song "He Hit Me (and It Felt like a Kiss)", and according to Harriet Gibson of The Guardian, "appear[s] to romanticise brutality". Molly Lambert of Grantland noted that the song is about a "difficult man" named Jim. Lambert hypothesized that "Jim" might be a reference to cult leader Jim Jones and the Jonestown massacre, due to the line "you're my cult leader." Aimee Ferrier of Far Out said fans often assume Jim "represents a figure akin to Jim Jones."

Kevin Rutherford of Radio.com remarked that "Ultraviolence" maintained the theme of songs previously released from the album; it "ups the lilting, low-tempo, strings-heavy form" Del Rey had established in her earlier work. Sal Cinquemani of Slant Magazine described "Ultraviolence" as a "laconic, string-laden torch song". A writer for the Music Times commented that the "violins, lightly thumping drums and Del Rey's angelic singing" gave the song a "church-y" feel, pointing out that the track presented her "title sound".

== Critical reception ==
She exalts a violent man on the title track, referencing the Crystals' 'He Hit Me (And It Felt Like a Kiss)'. It's harder still to listen knowing that Del Rey claims these situations are all true-to-life. 85% of domestic violence victims return to their abusers, submission is an ancient peccadillo, and there's no accounting for taste. But she conjures them with surface-level sadness worn like a shade of eyeshadow, which swiftly wears thin if you have no time for one-dimensional cads.

— NME on Ultraviolence

Nolan Feeney of Time criticized the song for its glorification of domestic violence, mentioning Lorde's comment on Del Rey's music: "This sort of shirt-tugging, desperate, don't leave me stuff. That's not a good thing for young girls, even young people, to hear." However, Feeney also stated that Del Rey would "likely" not endorse the "screwed-up tales of vice and luxury" her character, Lana Del Rey, sings about. While noting that Del Rey did not offer a positive or negative opinion on domestic violence, Harley Brown of Spin said that the lyrics to the song could generate controversy, especially since Del Rey dismissed feminism in an interview with The Fader, saying, "For me, the issue of feminism is just not an interesting concept. I'm more interested in, you know, SpaceX and Tesla, what's going to happen with our intergalactic possibilities. Whenever people bring up feminism, I'm like, god. I'm just not really that interested." By the end of 2014, NME named "Ultraviolence" the 32nd best song of the year.

== Music video ==
A music video, shot entirely on an iPhone on the 8mm Vintage Camera app, was directed by Francesco Carrozzini and filmed on July 3, 2014 in Portofino, Italy. In the video, Del Rey can be seen wearing a white wedding dress with a veil and a bouquet of flowers in her hands, wandering around an outside setting and later entering a church (Cappella di San Sebastiano). The video was released on July 30 by Noisey (Vice).

== Live performances ==
Del Rey premiered "Ultraviolence" as part of her set at the PNE Forum in Vancouver, British Columbia, Canada on May 25, 2014.

== Track listings ==
- Digital download
1. "Ultraviolence" – 4:41
- Digital download (Hook N Sling Remix)
1. "Ultraviolence" (Hook N Sling Remix) – 5:29

== Credits ==
Credits adapted from the liner notes of Ultraviolence.

Performance credits

- Lana Del Rey – vocals, background vocals
- Alfreda McCrary Lee – background vocals
- Ann McCrary – background vocals
- Regina McCrary – background vocals

Instruments

- Dan Auerbach – electric guitar
- Collin Dupuis – drum programming
- Seth Kaufman – electric guitar
- Leon Michels – piano, mellotron
- Nick Movshon – bass guitar
- Russ Pahl – pedal steel guitar
- Kenny Vaughan – electric guitar
- Maximilian Weissenfeldt – drums

Technical and production

- Dan Auerbach – production, mixing
- John Davis – mastering
- Collin Dupuis – engineering, mixing
- Robert Orton – mixing

== Charts ==
Chart (2014)	Peak position
Belgium (Ultratip Bubbling Under Flanders)	34
Belgium (Ultratip Bubbling Under Wallonia)	12
Canada Hot 100 (Billboard)	38
CIS Airplay (TopHit)	160
Czech Republic Singles Digital (ČNS IFPI)	59
France (SNEP)	88
US Billboard Hot 100	70

== Certifications ==
Certifications for "Ultraviolence"
Region	Certification	Certified units/sales
Australia (ARIA)	Gold	35,000^{‡}
Brazil (Pro-Música Brasil)	Platinum	60,000^{‡}
New Zealand (RMNZ)	Gold	15,000^{‡}
United Kingdom (BPI)	Gold	400,000^{‡}
United States (RIAA)	Platinum	1,000,000^{‡}
^{‡} Sales+streaming figures based on certification alone.

== Release history ==
Country	Date	Format	Label
Australia	June 4, 2014	Digital download	Interscope
Belgium	June 4, 2014	Digital download	Interscope
Finland	June 4, 2014	Digital download	Interscope
France	June 4, 2014	Digital download	Interscope
Luxembourg	June 4, 2014	Digital download	Interscope
Netherlands	June 4, 2014	Digital download	Interscope
United States	June 4, 2014	Digital download	Interscope; Universal
United Kingdom	August 18, 2014	Digital download	Polydor
Italy	October 3, 2014	Contemporary hit radio	Polydor
