= Jabberwocky (band) =

French electropop band

- Also known as: JBBRWCK
- Origin: Poitiers, France
- Genres: Electropop
- Years active: 2013-present
- Labels: Pain Surprises Records
- Members: Camille; Manu; Simon

Jabberwocky sometimes stylized as JBBRWCK is a French electropop band. It was formed in 2013 by three young French producers, Camille Camara, Simon Pasquer, and Emmanuel Bretou, still studying medicine and all originating from Poitiers, France. They had a number 2 hit in France with the single "Photomaton" featuring the vocals of Elodie Wildstars. The single and the music video were produced by the music collective Pain Surprises.

== Discography ==
=== Albums ===
Year	Album	Peak positions
Year	Album	FRA
2015	Lunar Lane	44
2017	Make-Make	127

=== Singles ===
Year	Single	Peak positions				Album
Year	Single	FRA	BEL (Wa)	GER	SWI	Album
2013	"Photomaton" (featuring Elodie Wildstars)	2	26	95	12	Lunar Lane
2014	"Pola" featuring Golshifteh Farahani (music video) and Clara Cappagli (songwriter)	172	—	—	—	Lunar Lane
2017	"Honeymoon"	87	—	—	—	Make-Make
