= Stove (album) =

Upcoming album by Lana Del Rey

Studio album by Lana Del Rey
- Labels: Interscope; Polydor
- Producers: Lana Del Rey; Jack Antonoff; Drew Erickson; Luke Laird

Lana Del Rey chronology
Did You Know That There's a Tunnel Under Ocean Blvd (2023)	Stove (TBA)	Untitled companion album (TBA)

Singles from Stove
- 1. "Henry, Come On" Released: April 11, 2025; 2. "Bluebird" Released: April 18, 2025; 3. "White Feather Hawk Tail Deer Hunter" Released: February 17, 2026

Stove is the upcoming tenth studio album by American singer-songwriter Lana Del Rey. It is set for release through Interscope and Polydor Records. The album was conceived as Del Rey's foray into country music. Three singles have been released: "Henry, Come On", "Bluebird" and "White Feather Hawk Tail Deer Hunter". The album was previously announced under the titles Lasso and The Right Person Will Stay, with release dates set for September 2024, and May 21, 2025, before its release was delayed as Del Rey worked on additional material that ultimately became a companion album to Stove.

== Background ==
In 2021, Del Rey announced that she had recorded an entire cover album of country music songs, inspired by her singles "Ride" (2012) and "Video Games" (2011). She elaborated: "I went back and listened to 'Ride' and 'Video Games' and thought, you know they're kind of country. Maybe the way 'Video Games' got remastered, they're pop—but there's something Americana about it for sure".

In 2023, Del Rey decided to "test the country waters" by performing a cover of "Stand by Your Man" in September, a rendition of "Unchained Melody" in November and releasing a cover version of "Take Me Home, Country Roads" in December.

On January 31, 2024, during a speech at the NMPA Songwriter Awards, Del Rey paid tribute to long-time collaborator Jack Antonoff and announced that they would be "going country" for her next musical endeavor, spurred by numerous commercially successful mainstream releases in 2023. The change of genres would mark a significant departure from her predominantly alternative pop musical output. The singer also announced the title to be Lasso and that it was slated for release in September 2024. On August 21, 2024, Del Rey confirmed in an interview with Vogue magazine that she would be releasing "two more [singles] [...] by the end of the year"; this did not materialize. She also stated that the sound of the album will not be a "heavy departure" from her previous albums, but would still be a "classic country, American, or Southern Gothic production".

== Release and promotion ==
On November 25, 2024, the same day she announced she would be embarking on an all-stadium tour throughout the UK and Ireland, she announced the album in a post on Instagram, now with the title The Right Person Will Stay, would be released on May 21, 2025, and that a song titled "Henry, Come On" would be pre-released. On April 11, the song was released as the lead single from the album. In a later Instagram post from the same day, she revealed that the album had undergone a second name change and would no longer be released in May. This follows a pattern for Del Rey, whose last three albums, namely Did You Know That There's a Tunnel Under Ocean Blvd, Chemtrails over the Country Club, and Blue Banisters, all faced delayed release timelines. In April 2025, Del Rey headlined the Stagecoach Festival in Indio, California, where she performed three new tracks to be included on the album; "Stars Fell on Alabama", "Quiet in the South", and "57.5".

On August 26, in an interview with W, Del Rey announced that the album's title was now Stove, and she was aiming for a release date around the end of January 2026. W previously leaked the working title of Classic through an Instagram post. Del Rey explained that the delayed release was a consequence of her decision to add six "autobiographical" songs to the album. Although the album was not released in early 2026, a new single, "White Feather Hawk Tail Deer Hunter", was released on February 17. Del Rey described the track as her "favorite song" and "the one I've been waiting for".

On July 15, 2026, Del Rey announced in an Instagram post that Stove was due to be completed in the next month. The post included vinyl artwork for Stove, depicting a portrait of Del Rey with a floral border. She also announced that the additional material had been expanded into a separate companion album, with Stove described as "lovely and intact as it was intended to be".
