= Lana Del Rey 2025 UK and Ireland Tour =

2025 concert tour by Lana Del Rey

Lana Del Rey UK and Ireland Tour 2025
- Tour by Lana Del Rey
- Promotional poster for the tour
- Location: England; Ireland; Scotland; Wales
- Associated album: Stove
- Start date: June 23, 2025
- End date: July 4, 2025
- No. of shows: 6
- Supporting acts: London Grammar; Banks; Addison Rae

Lana Del Rey concert chronology
- 2023 tour (2023); UK and Ireland Tour 2025 (2025)

UK and Ireland Tour 2025 was the seventh headlining concert tour by American singer-songwriter Lana Del Rey, in support of her upcoming tenth studio album, Stove (2026). Her first all-stadium tour, it began on June 23, 2025, in Cardiff and ended on July 4, in London.

== Background ==
Del Rey embarked on her sixth headlining tour in 2023 and completed the tour in 2024 after headlining Reading & Leeds Festival.

Del Rey announced the tour on November 25, 2024, on Instagram, and shortly after announced her tenth studio album, The Right Person Will Stay. A second London show for July 4, 2025 was added on November 29, due to overwhelming demand.

== Reception ==
Reviews of concerts were generally positive. Following the first concert of the tour in Cardiff, NME wrote that "Del Rey's country-leaning set brings Southern idyll and drama to her biggest-ever tour", while the Guardian praised the theatrical presentation of the concert. Following the final concert in London on July 4th, the Independent's review noted that Del Rey's "demure performance" were balanced out by her "smoky vocals and undeniable stage presence"; while the London Standard felt that the concert was "uneven" despite Del Rey's "enthralling" voice.

== Set list ==
This set list was taken from the show in Liverpool on June 28, 2025. It does not represent all shows throughout the tour.

1. "Stars Fell on Alabama"
2. "Henry, Come On"
3. "Stand by Your Man"
4. "Chemtrails Over the Country Club"
5. "Ultraviolence"
6. "Ride"
7. "Video Games"
8. "Norman Fucking Rockwell" (via hologram projection)
9. "Arcadia" (via hologram projection)
10. "Did You Know That There's a Tunnel Under Ocean Blvd"
11. "Quiet in the South"
12. "Scene D'Amour"
13. "Howl" (recital via hologram projection)
14. "Young and Beautiful"
15. "Summertime Sadness"
16. "Born to Die"
17. "57.5"
18. "Take Me Home, Country Roads"

=== Alterations ===
- An a capella of "Salvatore" was performed per fan request at the Cardiff show.
- After "Born to Die", Del Rey performed "Venice Bitch", and Addison Rae joined her on stage to perform "Diet Pepsi" and "57.5" at both London shows.
- "If You Lie Down with Me" was added before "Quiet in the South" at the second London show.

== Tour dates ==
List of 2025 concerts
Date	City	Country	Venue	Opening Act
June 23	Cardiff	Wales	Principality Stadium	London Grammar
June 26	Glasgow	Scotland	Hampden Park	Banks
June 28	Liverpool	England	Anfield	Banks
June 30	Dublin	Ireland	Aviva Stadium	Banks
July 3	London	England	Wembley Stadium	Addison Rae
July 4	London	England	Wembley Stadium	Addison Rae
