= White Feather Hawk Tail Deer Hunter =

Single by Lana Del Rey

from the album Stove
- Released: February 17, 2026
- Genre: Trap-folk
- Length: 3:54
- Label: Polydor; Interscope
- Songwriters: Lana Del Rey; Jack Antonoff; Drew Erickson; Jeremy Dufrene; Caroline "Chuck" Grant; Jason Pickens; David Raksin; Johnny Mercer
- Producers: Lana Del Rey; Jack Antonoff; Drew Erickson

Lana Del Rey singles chronology
"Bluebird" (2025)	"White Feather Hawk Tail Deer Hunter" (2026)	"First Light" (2026)

"White Feather Hawk Tail Deer Hunter" is a song by American singer-songwriter Lana Del Rey. It was released on February 17, 2026, as the third single from her upcoming tenth studio album, Stove.

== Background and release ==
Del Rey announced the release on February 7, 2026, via a series of Instagram posts. The song will be released as the third single from her upcoming tenth studio album, Stove, following the 2025 singles "Henry, Come On" and "Bluebird". Its release will be accompanied by a music video that was produced in collaboration with the song's co-writers. The announcement comes alongside news about her upcoming album and arrives approximately three years after her previous album, Did You Know That There's a Tunnel Under Ocean Blvd (2023).

Del Rey co-wrote the song with her husband Jeremy Dufrene, her brother-in-law Jason Pickens, and her sister Caroline "Chuck" Grant, with production handled by Del Rey herself, Jack Antonoff, and Drew Erickson, both of whom said they had "finally found that magical chord that was missing". Dean Reed and Laura Sisk are also credited for mixing, and Erickson for strings. Expressing enthusiasm about the release, Del Rey described the track as her favorite song on the album and the one she had been waiting on for a long time, adding: "I'm really happy about it. Finally going to be out."

The single album cover features a pan pastel drawing titled "on guard" by Tara Strubing, posted on Instagram on 2nd February 2025. Lana Del Rey tagged Tara Strubing in her Instagram post of her album cover on 13th February 2025, with the title of the song on the bottom of the painting.

== Composition ==
According to DIY, the track features a Gothic storybook-like atmosphere, combining breathy vocals, suspenseful string arrangements, and a theatrical vocal delivery that evokes the presence of a subtly sinister, "sort of devilishly alluring Disney villain".

The song is about Del Rey's devotion to her lover, Jeremy Dufrene. At the start of the song she sings lines such as "I know you wish you had a man like him, it's such a bummer,". In the chorus, she expresses contentment with her life with him, asking him to take her hand off the stove.

== Critical reception ==
Walden Green's review of the song for Pitchfork highlighted its sonic similarity to her previous work: "after a career spent writing paeans to deadbeats and douchebags, of course her take on true love sounds like a horror movie". Green further spotlighted Del Rey's influences for its sound: "within her potent brew are traces of Buffy Saint-Marie's early Buchla experiments, downtown eccentrics like Laura Nyro and Lotti Golden, and vintage Disney soundtracks".

== Music video ==
The music video for the song follows Del Rey around her house, evoking an atmosphere similar to home videos. It also references the lyrics; for example, a John Deere mower appears in the garage.

== Charts ==
Chart performance for "White Feather Hawk Tail Deer Hunter"
Chart (2026)	Peak position
Australia New Music Singles (ARIA)	16
Canada Hot 100 (Billboard)	84
Global 200 (Billboard)	171
Greece International (IFPI)	49
Ireland (IRMA)	66
Lithuania (AGATA)	88
Netherlands (Single Tip)	18
New Zealand Hot Singles (RMNZ)	12
Sweden Heatseeker (Sverigetopplistan)	15
UK Singles (Official Charts)	58
US Bubbling Under Hot 100 (Billboard)	6
US Hot Rock & Alternative Songs (Billboard)	28
