= White Dress (disambiguation) =

"White Dress" is a 2021 song by Lana Del Rey.

White Dress may refer to:

- "White Dress", a song by French Montana from the 2017 album Jungle Rules
- "White Dress", a song by Kanye West from the 2012 soundtrack The Man with the Iron Fists
- "White Dress", a 2015 song by Set Mo and Deutsche Duke

== Other uses ==
- White dress of Marilyn Monroe, a dress worn by Marilyn Monroe in The Seven Year Itch
- The White Dress, a 1945 murder mystery novel by Mignon G. Eberhart
