= Lana Del Rey =

American singer-songwriter (born 1985)

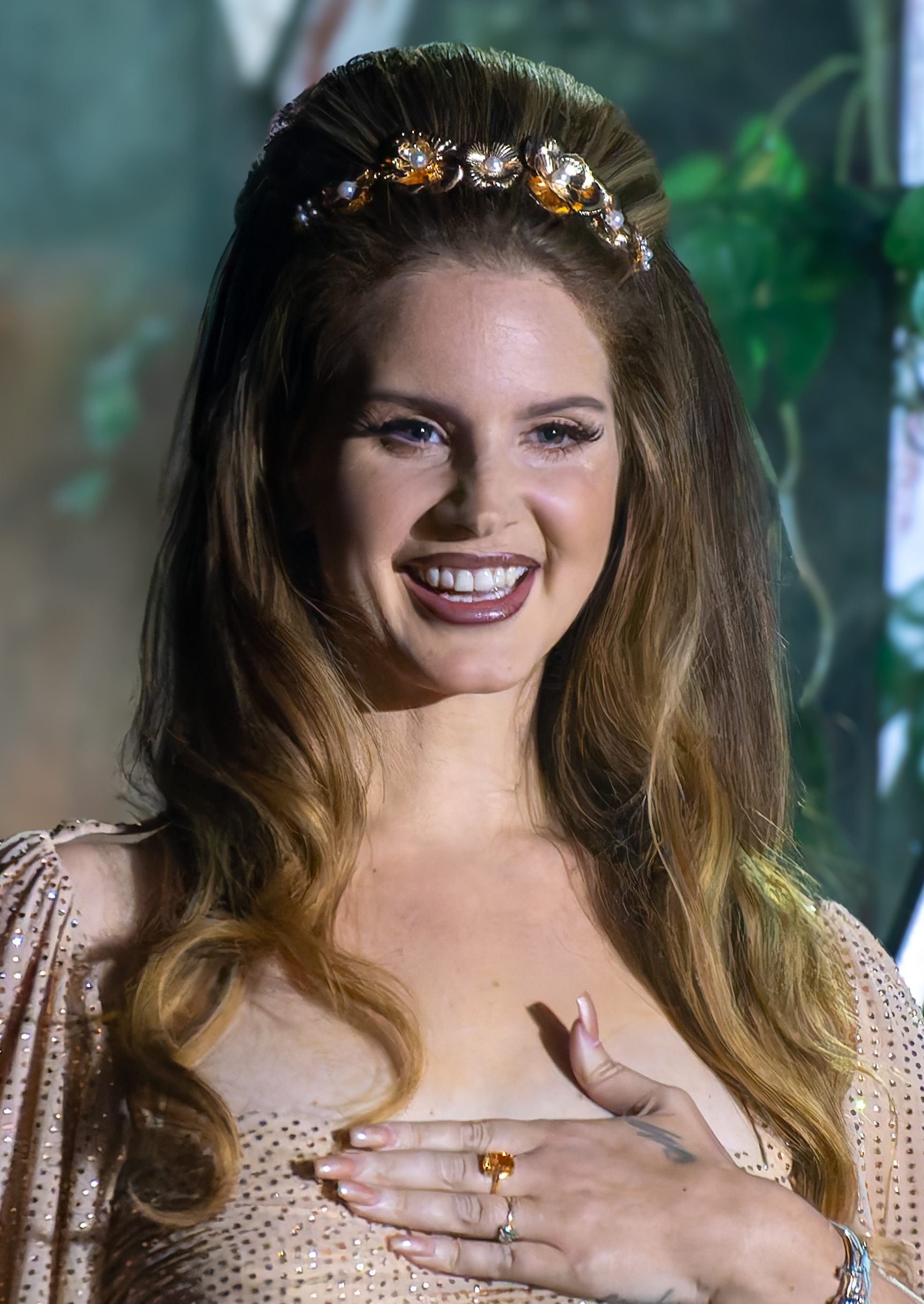
- Del Rey in 2024
- Born: Elizabeth Woolridge Grant; June 21, 1985 (age 41); New York City, U.S.
- Other names: Lana Rey Del Mar; Lizzy Grant; May Jailer; Sparkle Jump Rope Queen
- Education: Fordham University (BA)
- Occupations: Singer; songwriter
- Years active: 2005–present
- Works: Discography; live performances; songs; unreleased songs; videography
- Spouse: Jeremy Dufrene (m. 2024)
- Awards: Full list
- Musical career
- Genres: Alternative pop; baroque pop; dream pop; Americana
- Instrument: Vocals
- Labels: 5 Points; Stranger; Polydor; Interscope
- Website: lanadelrey.com

Elizabeth Woolridge Grant (born June 21, 1985), known professionally as Lana Del Rey, is an American singer-songwriter. Credited with shaping modern alternative pop and influencing mainstream pop music, her work explores melancholic themes of romance and glamour alongside frequent references to pop culture and 1950s–1970s Americana.

Del Rey grew up in upstate New York and moved to Manhattan in 2005 to pursue a music career. After signing with Polydor and Interscope, she released her major-label debut, Born to Die (2012)—featuring a cinematic, hip-hop-inflected sound, it garnered a cult following and became the longest-charting album by a woman on the US Billboard 200. She incorporated psychedelic, orchestral, and folk elements into her subsequent releases, including Ultraviolence (2014), Honeymoon (2015), and Lust for Life (2017). Her sixth studio album, Norman Fucking Rockwell! (2019), was named one of the 500 greatest albums of all time by Rolling Stone. She achieved further critical and commercial success with Chemtrails Over the Country Club (2021), Blue Banisters (2021), and Did You Know That There's a Tunnel Under Ocean Blvd (2023), the latter of which spawned the single "A&W", also listed among Rolling Stone's 500 greatest songs. She subsequently pivoted toward country music for her upcoming tenth studio album, Stove, preceded by the singles "Henry, Come On", "Bluebird", and "White Feather Hawk Tail Deer Hunter".

Del Rey has received numerous accolades, including an MTV Video Music Award, three MTV Europe Music Awards, two Brit Awards, and two Billboard Women in Music honors, alongside 11 Grammy Award nominations. Her contributions to film soundtracks have also earned her a Satellite Award, two Critics' Choice Movie Award nominations, and a Golden Globe Award nomination. Beyond her musical output, Del Rey wrote and directed the short film Tropico (2013) and published the poetry and photography collection Violet Bent Backwards over the Grass (2020).

== Early life and education ==
Elizabeth Woolridge Grant was born on June 21, 1985 in Manhattan, to Robert England Grant Jr., a copywriter at Grey Global Group, and Patricia Ann "Pat" Grant (née Hill), an account executive at the same organization. She has a younger sister, Caroline "Chuck" Grant, and a younger brother, Charlie Grant. Of Scottish and English descent, she was raised Catholic. When she was a year old, the family relocated to Lake Placid, New York, where her father worked for a furniture company before becoming an entrepreneurial domain investor, and her mother worked as a schoolteacher. During her elementary years, she attended St. Agnes School and began singing in her church choir, serving as the cantor.

She attended the high school where her mother taught for a year, but at age 14, her parents sent her to Kent School, an Episcopal boarding school in Kent, Connecticut, to address her developing alcoholism. Her uncle, an admissions officer at the school, secured her financial aid to attend. Reflecting on this period, Grant stated "That's really why I got sent to boarding school aged 14—to get sober." According to Grant, she had difficulty making friends during much of her adolescence and early adulthood. She noted preoccupied with death from a young age, which contributed to feelings of anxiety and alienation:

When I was very young I was sort of floored by the fact that my mother and my father and everyone I knew was going to die one day, and myself too. I had a sort of a philosophical crisis. I couldn't believe that we were mortal. For some reason that knowledge sort of overshadowed my experience. I was unhappy for some time. I got into a lot of trouble. I used to drink a lot. That was a hard time in my life.

Grant later dropped out of school to go to rehab; she has been sober since 2003. She spent a year living on Long Island with her aunt and uncle and working as a waitress. Grant, also briefly worked as a model, signed to Ford. During that time, Grant's uncle taught her to play guitar and she "realized [that she] could probably write a million songs with those six chords". Shortly after, she began writing songs and performing in nightclubs around the city under various names such as "Sparkle Jump Rope Queen" and "Lizzy Grant and the Phenomena". "I was always singing, but didn't plan on pursuing it seriously", she said:

When I got to New York City when I was eighteen, I started playing in clubs in Brooklyn—I have good friends and devoted fans on the underground scene, but we were playing for each other at that point—and that was it.

She originally attended State University of New York at Geneseo, but dropped out to take a gap year. In fall 2004, at age 19, Grant enrolled at Fordham University in the Bronx, New York where she majored in philosophy with an emphasis on metaphysics. She has said she chose to study the subject because it "bridged the gap between God and science... I was interested in God and how technology could bring us closer to finding out where we came from and why."

== Career ==
=== Early recordings (2005–2010) ===
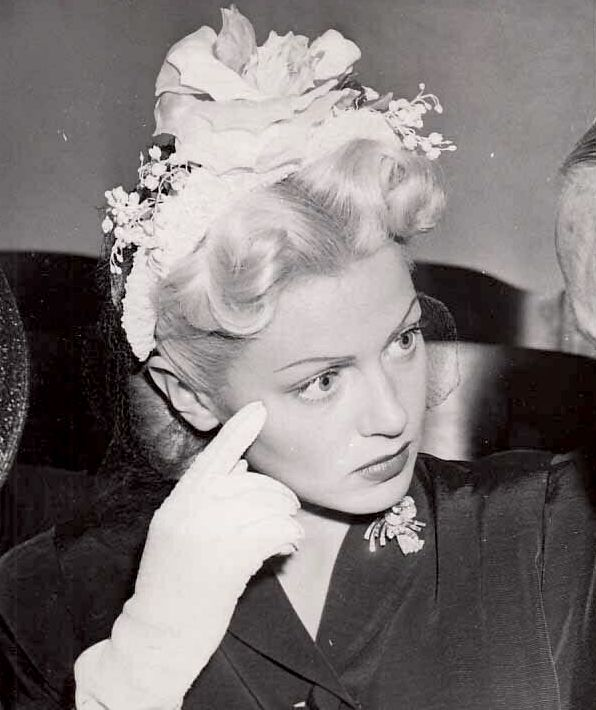
Lana Turner, a film actress who inspired Del Rey's stage name

In early 2005, while attending college, Del Rey registered a seven-track extended play with the United States Copyright Office under the title Rock Me Stable (also listed as Young Like Me). A second extended play, From the End, was also recorded under Del Rey's stage name at the time, May Jailer. Between 2005 and 2006 she recorded an acoustic album, Sirens, under the May Jailer project, which leaked on the internet in mid-2012.

I wanted to be part of a high-class scene of musicians. It was half-inspired because I didn't have many friends, and I was hoping that I would meet people and fall in love and start a community around me, the way they used to do in the '60s.

— Del Rey explaining why she went into the music industry.

The following year, after making her first public performance at the Williamsburg Live Songwriting Competition, she met Van Wilson, an A&R representative for David Nichtern's independent label, 5 Points Records. While a senior at Fordham in 2007, she submitted an acoustic demo tape, No Kung Fu, to the label, which signed her to a $10,000 recording contract. She used the money to move to Manhattan Mobile Home Park, a trailer park in North Bergen, New Jersey and began working with producer David Kahne. Nichtern recalled: "Our plan was to get it all organized and have a record to go and she'd be touring right after she graduated from college. Like a lot of artists, she morphed. When she first came to us, she was playing plunky little acoustic guitar, [had] sort of straight blonde hair, very cute young woman. A little bit dark, but very intelligent. We heard that. But she very quickly kept evolving."

Del Rey graduated from Fordham with a Bachelor of Arts degree in philosophy in 2008 after which she released a three-track EP, Kill Kill, as Lizzy Grant, featuring production by Kahne. She explained: "David asked to work with me only a day after he got my demo. He is known as a producer with a lot of integrity and who had an interest in making music that wasn't just pop." Outside of music, Del Rey volunteered in community outreach programs supporting individuals experiencing homelessness and substance addiction. Her interest in service began in college, when she "took a road trip across the country to paint and rebuild houses on a Native American reservation".

Explaining the inspiration behind her stage name, Del Rey stated: "I wanted a name I could shape the music towards. I was going to Miami quite a lot at the time, speaking a lot of Spanish with my friends from Cuba—Lana Del Rey reminded us of the glamour of the seaside. It sounded gorgeous coming off the tip of the tongue." The name was also inspired by actress Lana Turner and the Ford Del Rey sedan, produced and sold in Brazil in the 1980s. Initially she used the alternate spelling Lana Del Ray, the name under which her self-titled debut album was released in January 2010. Her father helped with the marketing of the album, which was available for purchase on iTunes for a brief period before being withdrawn in April 2010. Kahne and Nichtern said that Del Rey bought the rights back from 5 Points, as she wanted it out of circulation to "stifle future opportunities to distribute it—an echo of rumors the action was part of a calculated strategy". She met her managers, Ben Mawson and Ed Millett, three months after Lana Del Ray was released, and they helped her get out of her contract with 5 Points Records, where, in her opinion, "nothing was happening". Shortly after, she moved to London, and moved in with Mawson "for a few years". On September 1, 2010, Del Rey was featured by Mando Diao in its MTV Unplugged concert at Union Film-Studios in Berlin, Germany. Also in 2010, she acted in a short film, Poolside, which she made with several friends.

=== Global breakthrough with Born to Die and Paradise (2011–2013) ===
Del Rey in a 2012 H&M Campaign in Dōtonbori, Osaka, Japan

In 2011, Del Rey uploaded self-made music videos for her songs "Video Games" and "Blue Jeans" to YouTube, featuring vintage footage interspersed with shots of her singing on her webcam. The "Video Games" music video became a viral internet sensation, which led to Del Rey being signed by Stranger Records to release the song as her debut single. She told The Observer: "I just put that song online a few months ago because it was my favorite. To be honest, it wasn't going to be the single but people have really responded to it." The song earned her a Q award for "Next Big Thing" in October 2011 and an Ivor Novello for "Best Contemporary Song" in 2012. In the same month, she signed a joint deal with Interscope Records and Polydor to release her second studio album Born to Die. She started dating Scottish singer Barrie-James O'Neill in the same year. The couple split in 2014 after three years together. Del Rey performed two songs from the album on Saturday Night Live on January 14, 2012, and received a negative response from various critics and the general public, who deemed the performance uneven and vocally shaky. She had earlier defended her spot on the program, saying: "I'm a good musician ... I have been singing for a long time, and I think that [SNL creator] Lorne Michaels knows that ... it's not a fluke decision."

Born to Die was released worldwide on January 31, 2012, to commercial success, charting at number one in 11 countries and debuting at number two on the US Billboard 200 album chart, although critics at the time were divided. The same week, she announced she had bought back the rights to her 2010 debut album and had plans to re-release it in the summer of 2012 under Interscope Records and Polydor. Contrary to Del Rey's press statement, her previous record label and producer David Kahne have both stated that she bought the rights to the album when she and the label parted company, due to the offer of a new deal, in April 2010. Born to Die sold 3.4 million copies in 2012, making it the fifth-best-selling album of 2012. In the United States, Born to Die charted on the Billboard 200 well into 2012, lingering at number 76, after 36 weeks on the chart. As of February 3, 2024, Born to Die had spent 520 weeks (10 years) on the Billboard 200, making Del Rey the second woman to reach this milestone, previously achieved only by Adele. Billboard credited the album as "one of the main catalysts for pop's mid-2010s shift from brash EDM to a moodier, hip-hop-inflected palette."

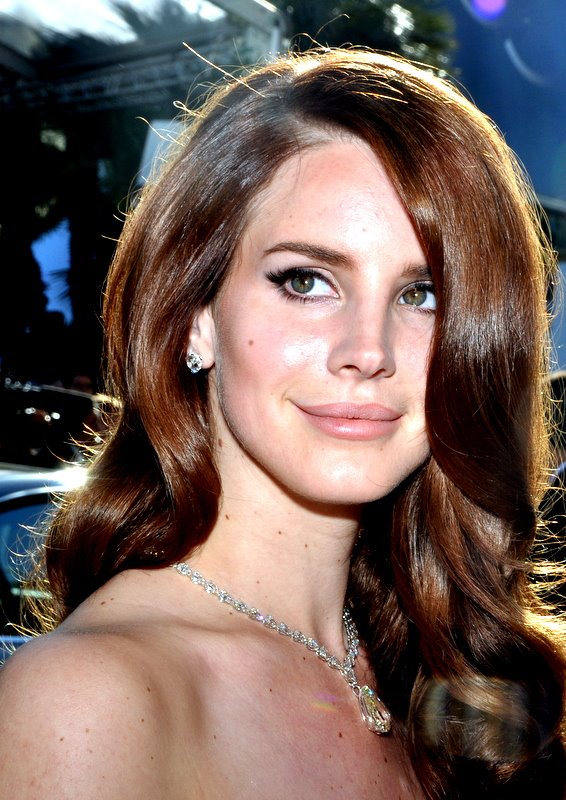
Del Rey at the 2012 Cannes Film Festival

In September 2012, Del Rey unveiled the F-Type for Jaguar at the Paris Motor Show and later recorded the song "Burning Desire", which appeared in a promotional short film for the vehicle. Adrian Hallmark, Jaguar's global brand director, explained the company's choice, saying Del Rey had "a unique blend of authenticity and modernity". In late September 2012, a music video for Del Rey's cover of "Blue Velvet" was released as a promotional single for the H&M 2012 autumn campaign, which Del Rey also modeled for in print advertising. On September 25, Del Rey released the single "Ride" in promotion of her upcoming EP, Paradise. She subsequently premiered the music video for "Ride" at the Aero Theatre in Santa Monica, California, on October 10, 2012. Some critics panned the video for being allegedly pro-prostitution and antifeminist, due to Del Rey's portrayal of a prostitute in a biker gang.

Paradise was released on November 12, 2012, as a standalone release, as well as Born to Die: The Paradise Edition, which combined Del Rey's previous album with the additional eight tracks on Paradise. Paradise marked Del Rey's second top 10 album in the United States, debuting at number 10 on the Billboard 200 with 67,000 copies sold in its first week. It was also later nominated for Best Pop Vocal Album at the 56th Annual Grammy Awards. Del Rey received several nominations at the 2012 MTV Europe Music Awards in November and won the award for Best Alternative performer. At the Brit Awards in February 2013, she won the award for International Female Solo Artist, followed by two Echo Award wins, in the categories of Best International Newcomer and Best International Pop/Rock Artist.

Over the next several months, she released videos of two cover songs: one of Leonard Cohen's "Chelsea Hotel #2", followed by a duet with her then-boyfriend, Barrie-James O'Neill, of Lee Hazlewood and Nancy Sinatra's "Summer Wine". In May 2013, Del Rey released an original song, "Young and Beautiful" for the soundtrack of the 2013 film adaptation of The Great Gatsby. Following the song's release, it peaked at 22 on the Billboard Hot 100. However, shortly after its release to contemporary hit radio, the label prematurely pulled it and decided to send a different song to radio; on July 2, 2013, a Cedric Gervais remix of Del Rey's "Summertime Sadness" was sent to radio; a sleeper hit, the song proved to be a commercial success, surpassing "Young and Beautiful", reaching number 6 on the Billboard Hot 100 and becoming her first American top ten hit. The remix won the Grammy Award for Best Remixed Recording, Non-Classical in 2013, while "Young and Beautiful" was nominated for Best Song Written for Visual Media.

In June 2013, Del Rey filmed Tropico, a musical short film paired to tracks from Paradise, directed by Anthony Mandler. Del Rey screened the film on December 4, 2013, at the Cinerama Dome in Hollywood. On December 6, the soundtrack was released on digital outlets.

=== Ultraviolence, Honeymoon, and film work (2014–2016) ===
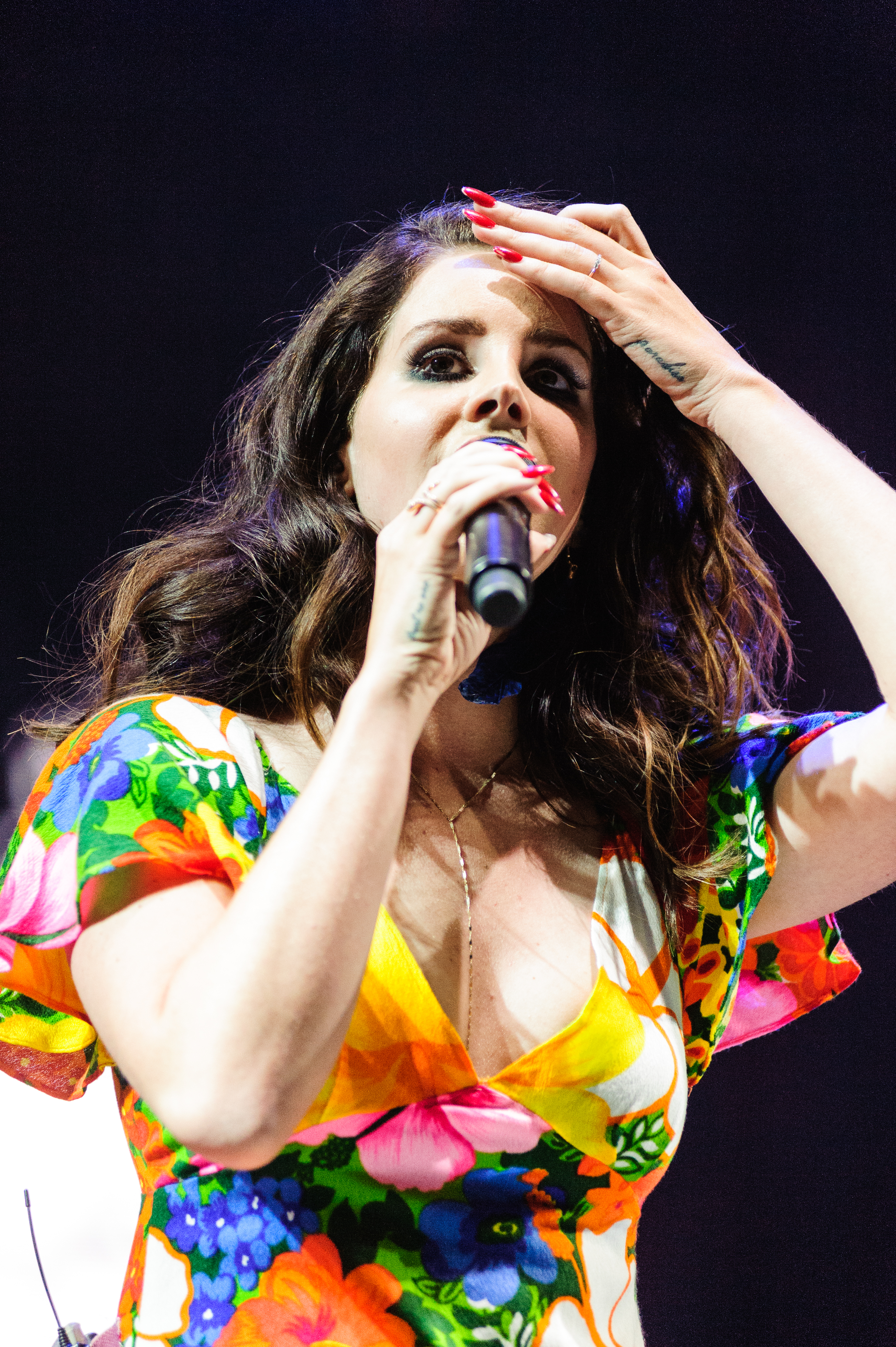
Del Rey performing at 2014 Coachella

On January 26, 2014, Del Rey released a cover of "Once Upon a Dream" for the 2014 dark fantasy film Maleficent. Following the completion of Paradise, Del Rey began writing and recording her follow-up album, Ultraviolence, featuring production by Dan Auerbach. Ultraviolence was released on June 13, 2014, and debuted at number one in 12 countries, including the United States and United Kingdom. The album, which sold 880,000 copies worldwide in its first week, was preceded by the singles "West Coast", "Shades of Cool", "Ultraviolence", and "Brooklyn Baby". She began dating photographer Francesco Carrozzini after he directed Del Rey's music video for "Ultraviolence"; the two broke up in November 2015 after more than a year. Del Rey described the album as being "more stripped down but still cinematic and dark", while some critics characterized the record as psychedelic and desert rock-influenced, more prominently featuring guitar instrumentation than her previous releases. Later that year, Del Rey contributed the songs "Big Eyes" and "I Can Fly" to Tim Burton's 2014 biographical film Big Eyes.

Honeymoon, Del Rey's fourth studio album, was released on September 18, 2015, to acclaim from music critics. Prior to the release of the album, Del Rey previewed the track "Honeymoon", the single "High by the Beach", and the promotional single "Terrence Loves You". Prior to the release of Honeymoon, Del Rey embarked on The Endless Summer Tour in May 2015, which featured Courtney Love and Grimes as opening acts. Additionally, Del Rey co-wrote and provided vocals on the track "Prisoner" from the Weeknd's Beauty Behind the Madness, released on August 28, 2015. In November 2015, she executive produced a short film Hi, How Are You Daniel Johnston, documenting the life of singer-songwriter Daniel Johnston. For the film, she covered Johnston's song "Some Things Last a Long Time". In November 2015, Del Rey received the Trailblazer Award at the Billboard Women in Music ceremony and won the MTV Europe Music Award for Best Alternative.

On February 9, 2016, Del Rey premiered a music video for the song "Freak" from Honeymoon at the Wiltern Theatre in Los Angeles. Later that year, Del Rey collaborated with the Weeknd for his album Starboy (2016), providing backing vocals on "Party Monster" and lead vocals on "Stargirl Interlude". "Party Monster", which Del Rey also co-wrote, was released as a single and subsequently reached the Top 20 on the Billboard Hot 100 and was certified double-platinum in the US.

=== Lust for Life and Norman Fucking Rockwell! (2017–2019) ===
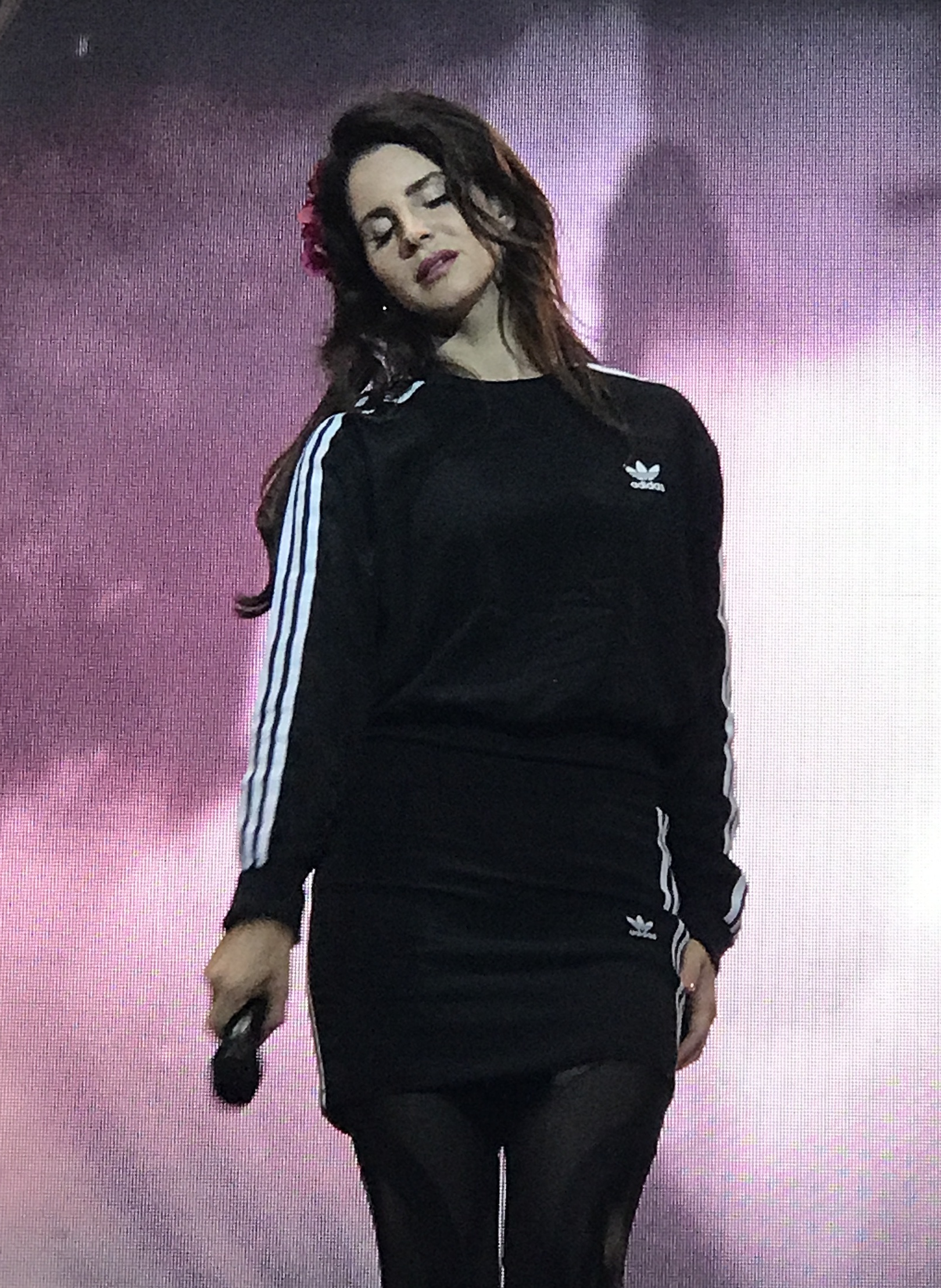
Del Rey performing at the 2017 Flow Festival in Helsinki, Finland

Del Rey's fifth studio album, Lust for Life, was released on July 21, 2017. The album was preceded by the singles "Love"; "Lust for Life" with the Weeknd; "Summer Bummer" with A$AP Rocky and Playboi Carti; and "Groupie Love", also with Rocky. Prior to its release, Del Rey commented: "I made my first 4 albums for me, but this one is for my fans and about where I hope we are all headed." The record further featured collaborations with Stevie Nicks and Sean Ono Lennon, marking the first time she has featured other artists on her own release. The album received generally favorable reviews and became Del Rey's third number-one album in the United Kingdom, and second number-one album in the United States. On September 27, 2017, Del Rey announced the LA to the Moon Tour, an official concert tour with Jhené Aiko and Kali Uchis to further promote the album. The tour began in North America during January 2018 and concluded in August. Lust for Life was nominated for Best Pop Vocal Album for the 60th Grammy Awards, marking Del Rey's second nomination in the category.

In January 2018, Del Rey announced that she was in a lawsuit with British rock band Radiohead over alleged similarities between their song "Creep" and her song "Get Free". Following her announcement, legal representatives from their label Warner/Chappell denied the lawsuit, as well as Del Rey's claims of the band asking for "100% of the song's royalties". Del Rey announced that summer while performing at Lollapalooza in Brazil the lawsuit was "over". Throughout 2018, Del Rey appeared as a guest vocalist on several tracks by other musicians, including "Living with Myself" by Jonathan Wilson for Rare Birds (2018), "God Save Our Young Blood" and "Blue Madonna" by Børns for Blue Madonna (2018), and "Woman" by Cat Power for Wanderer (2018). In November 2019, Del Rey was announced as the face of Gucci's Guilty fragrances and subsequently appeared in print and television advertisements with Jared Leto and Courtney Love. The campaign was centered around the concept of "Hollyweird". Gucci creative director Alessandro Michele said Guilty is a scent for a woman who does whatever she wants; Del Rey stated she is "very much that person".

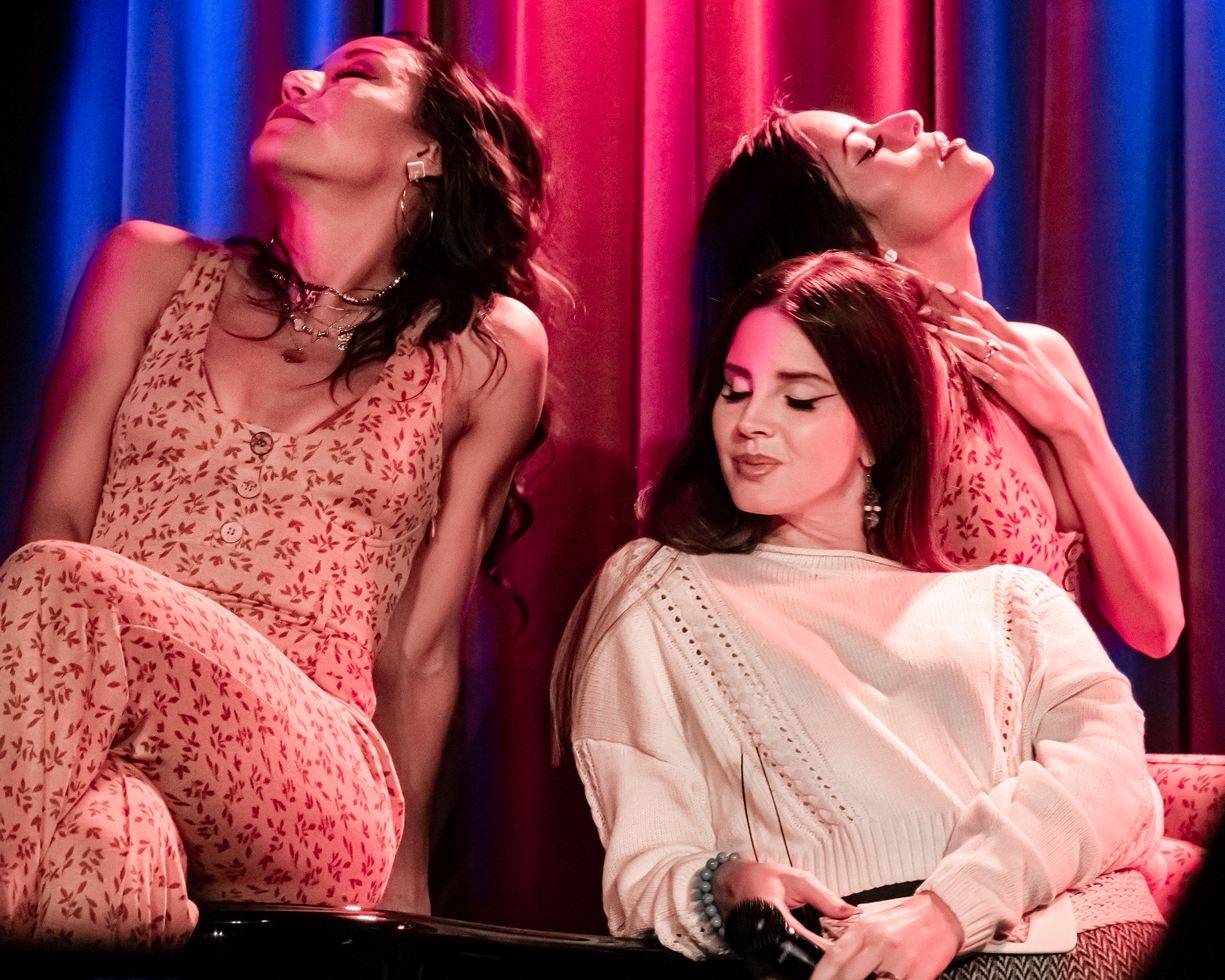
Del Rey performing at the Grammy Museum in October 2019

On August 6, 2019, Del Rey presented filmmaker Guillermo del Toro with his star on the Hollywood Walk of Fame and subsequently released a cover of "Season of the Witch" for his film, Scary Stories to Tell in the Dark. On the same day, Del Rey released the non-album single "Looking for America", which she spontaneously wrote and recorded earlier that week in response to back-to-back mass shootings in El Paso and Dayton.

Her sixth studio album, Norman Fucking Rockwell!, was released on August 30, 2019. Having announced the album in September 2018, the album was preceded by the singles "Mariners Apartment Complex", "Venice Bitch", "Hope Is a Dangerous Thing for a Woman like Me to Have – but I Have It", and "Doin' Time", as well as the joint-single "Fuck It, I Love You"/ "The Greatest". The album received widespread critical acclaim, and, according to review aggregator website Metacritic, is the best-reviewed album of Del Rey's career to date. NME awarded the album five out of five stars. In his review for Rolling Stone, Rob Sheffield wrote "the long-awaited Norman Fucking Rockwell is even more massive and majestic than everyone hoped it would be. Lana turns her fifth and finest album into a tour of sordid American dreams, going deep cover in all our nation's most twisted fantasies of glamour and danger", and ultimately deemed the album a "pop classic". The album was nominated for two Grammy Awards, Album of the Year and Song of the Year, for its title track. Norman Fucking Rockwell! marked the first time Del Rey worked with Jack Antonoff, who co-wrote and produced much of the album; Antonoff later worked with Del Rey on her following studio album and spoken word album. The corresponding tour was held in the fall of 2019.

In September, Del Rey was featured on a collaboration with Ariana Grande and Miley Cyrus titled "Don't Call Me Angel", the lead single of the soundtrack for the 2019 film Charlie's Angels. The song was moderately successful internationally and was later certified Gold in several countries. In November, Del Rey appeared in the Amazon Prime special The Kacey Musgraves Christmas Show, alongside guests such as Camila Cabello, James Corden, and Troye Sivan.

=== Chemtrails over the Country Club, Blue Banisters, and poetry collections (2020–2021) ===
In an interview for L'Officiel's first American edition in early 2018, when asked about her interest in making a film, Del Rey responded she had been approached to write a Broadway musical and had recently begun work on it. When asked how long it would be until completion of the work, she replied, "I may finish in two or three years." She also announced she would be contributing to the soundtrack of a new adaptation of Alice's Adventures in Wonderland.

After announcing a spoken word album in 2019, Del Rey released Violet Bent Backwards over the Grass and its corresponding spoken word album in 2020. The physical book was released on September 29 and the Jack Antonoff-produced audiobook on July 28. The spoken word poem "LA Who Am I to Love You" was released as the lead single the day before the album's release. In May 2020, Del Rey announced a second book, Behind the Iron Gates – Insights from the Institution, which was originally planned to be released in March 2021; her progress on the book was lost when the manuscript was stolen from her car in 2022.

In September 2020, Del Rey was featured on a remix of Matt Maeson's 2019 song "Hallucinogenics". The duo had previously performed the song together live in 2019. In November 2020, Del Rey announced that she would release a digital record composed of "American standards and classics" on Christmas Day, though it has yet to be released. The record features several songs recorded with Nikki Lane. In the same month, she contributed to a documentary about Liverpool F.C., The End of the Storm, where she performed the club's anthem, "You'll Never Walk Alone". Del Rey also released the cover as a limited-edition single, with all profits going to the LFC foundation. She is known to be a fan of the club and has attended matches at Anfield. Del Rey started dating reality tv star Sean Larkin in September 2019. The pair split in March 2020. In December 2020, it was reported that she was engaged to musician Clayton Johnson.

On March 19, 2021, Del Rey released her seventh studio album, Chemtrails over the Country Club, to critical acclaim. Announced in 2019, the album was originally slated for release in 2020 under the title White Hot Forever but was postponed in November 2020 due to a delay in vinyl manufacturing. Like Norman Fucking Rockwell!, Chemtrails over the Country Club was mostly produced by Del Rey alongside Jack Antonoff. It was preceded by the singles "Let Me Love You like a Woman" on October 16, 2020, and the title track on January 11, 2021. Music videos were released for both songs as well as "White Dress".

Her eighth studio album, Blue Banisters, was released on October 22, 2021. It was preceded by the simultaneous release of three songs on May 20, 2021: the title track, "Text Book", and "Wildflower Wildfire", as well as the release of the single "Arcadia" on September 8, 2021. A music video was released for "Arcadia" on September 8, 2021, with an alternate music video for the track released on October 7, 2021. A music video for the track "Blue Banisters" was released on October 20, 2021.

=== Did You Know That There's a Tunnel Under Ocean Blvd, Stove and companion album (2022–present) ===
Del Rey performing at the 2024 Primavera Sound in Barcelona, California, 2024

On January 21, 2022, Del Rey premiered a song titled "Watercolor Eyes" on an episode of Euphoria. Del Rey confirmed in 2022 she had been working on new music and poetry; however, on October 19, 2022, she posted a series of videos to her Instagram revealing her car was burgled "a few months" prior, and her backpack—containing a laptop, hard drives, and three camcorders—was stolen, giving thieves access to unfinished songs, a 200-page manuscript of her upcoming poetry book Behind the Iron Gates - Insights from an Institution, and two years' worth of family video footage. Del Rey erased the stolen laptop's contents remotely, which contained the only working copy of her poetry book. "Despite all of this happening, I am confident in the record to come", Del Rey concluded in her Instagram videos.

On October 21, 2022, Del Rey was featured on "Snow on the Beach" by Taylor Swift, on her album Midnights, written by Swift, Del Rey, and Jack Antonoff. The song debuted at number 4 on the Billboard Hot 100, becoming Del Rey's highest-peaking entry on the chart. On December 7, 2022, Del Rey released "Did You Know That There's a Tunnel Under Ocean Blvd" as the lead single from her ninth studio album of the same name. In January 2023, Del Rey was photographed by Nadia Lee Cohen and interviewed by Billie Eilish for the cover of Interview's March issue. In the interview, Del Rey revealed that the album would explore her innermost thoughts and that some of the songs on the album are "super long and wordy". On February 14, 2023, "A&W" was released as the second single from the album and, a month later, on March 14, 2023, the third single of the album, "The Grants", was released. Did You Know That There's a Tunnel Under Ocean Blvd was released on March 24, 2023.

On May 19, 2023, Del Rey released her popular unreleased song "Say Yes to Heaven" as a single, having previously written and recorded it in November 2013, planning to include it in Ultraviolence, before cutting it. Parts of the song were leaked on August 15, 2016, and released on Spotify by others impersonating Del Rey. On May 26, 2023, Taylor Swift released a remix of "Snow on the Beach", featuring "more" Lana Del Rey, along with the Til Dawn edition of her album Midnights, due to demand from fans wanting Del Rey to have a verse in the song, when in the original she only had backing vocals. On July 20, 2023, Del Rey was spotted pouring coffee and chatting with customers at a Waffle House in Florence, Alabama, in full employee uniform complete with her own "Lana" name tag. Del Rey later explained about the situation that after a few hours there the servers asked if she wanted a shirt, to which Del Rey said yes. While wearing her uniform, the Waffle House manager asked her to serve a regular customer. In 2023, Del Rey embarked on a promotional tour which lasted until 2025.

On October 20, 2023, Del Rey featured in Holly Macve's single "Suburban House". Macve shared that the two artists had originally crossed paths in 2017 and that she was a "big fan of [Lana's] music". On November 10, 2023, Del Rey earned 5 nominations at the 2024 Grammy Awards, which included Album of the Year and Best Alternative Music Album for Did You Know That There's a Tunnel Under Ocean Blvd, Song of the Year and Best Alternative Music Performance for "A&W", and Best Pop Duo/Group Performance for "Candy Necklace" with Jon Batiste. She was hired as the face for the Skims 2024 Valentines Day Collection.

Del Rey performing at Wembley Stadium in July 2025

On January 31, 2024, at Billboard's pre-Grammy event, Del Rey announced her upcoming tenth studio album. Originally titled Lasso and due for release in September 2024, the album's title would change to The Right Person Will Stay due for release in May 2025 before Del Rey confirmed the new title Stove in January 2026. It is set to be her first country album. "Tough", a collaboration with American rapper Quavo, was released on July 3, 2024.

In April 2024, Del Rey resumed performances with a headlining slot at Coachella. Following the performance, she announced her first-ever solo headlining stadium concert at Fenway Park in Boston on June 20. The show, which sold-out, garnered criticism from some fans for going ahead, despite being delayed due to a thunderstorm and being shortened to follow local sound curfew ordinances. Throughout the summer, Del Rey performed at festivals throughout Europe, including Primavera Sound in Spain and the Reading and Leeds Festivals in England. In total, Del Rey performed 10 shows on the 2024 leg of the tour.

In November 2024, Del Rey announced a six-date 2025 UK and Ireland leg, which began on June 23 and ended on July 4. An all-stadium leg, it marked her debut performances at the Principality Stadium in Cardiff, Hampden Park in Glasgow, Anfield in Liverpool, Aviva Stadium in Dublin, and two shows at Wembley Stadium in London. Opening acts for the UK and Ireland shows were announced on June 22, 2025, consisting of London Grammar in Cardiff, Banks in Glasgow, Liverpool and Dublin, and Addison Rae for the London dates. In 2025, Del Rey and the Weeknd collaborated on the track "The Abyss" from his album Hurry Up Tomorrow. On April 25, 2025, Del Rey performed at Stagecoach Festival, previewing several new songs from her upcoming country-influenced album. The album was preceded by the singles "Henry, Come On" and "Bluebird", both co-written with Luke Laird and produced alongside Drew Erickson.

On April 16, 2026, Del Rey released the song "First Light" from the soundtrack to the James Bond video game of the same name.

On July 15, 2026, Del Rey announced in a post on Instagram that Stove was nearing completion, and that additional material had been compiled in a second "companion" album, made with multiple collaborators. The post included images of the artwork for two vinyl artworks, one for Stove, and the other featuring a boat named "Spyda", suggesting this as the title for the companion album. On October 15, 2026, American singer-songwriter Zach Bryan released "Lies", a collaboration with Del Rey.

On November 14, 2026, five days before the premiere of the action-adventure game Grand Theft Auto VI, the game's soundtrack album was leaked and contained an unreleased outtake from Honeymoon, "Crazy for You", produced with Rick Nowels. On November 20, the day after the game's release, the soundtrack album, Grand Theft Auto VI: The Album, was officially released. The song itself, besides being on the playlist on one of the radio stations in the game, is also used in one of the first missions in the game. The official version of the song has several verse lyrics that differ from the previously leaked version. The song was first unofficially leaked in December 2022.

== Artistry ==
=== Musical style ===
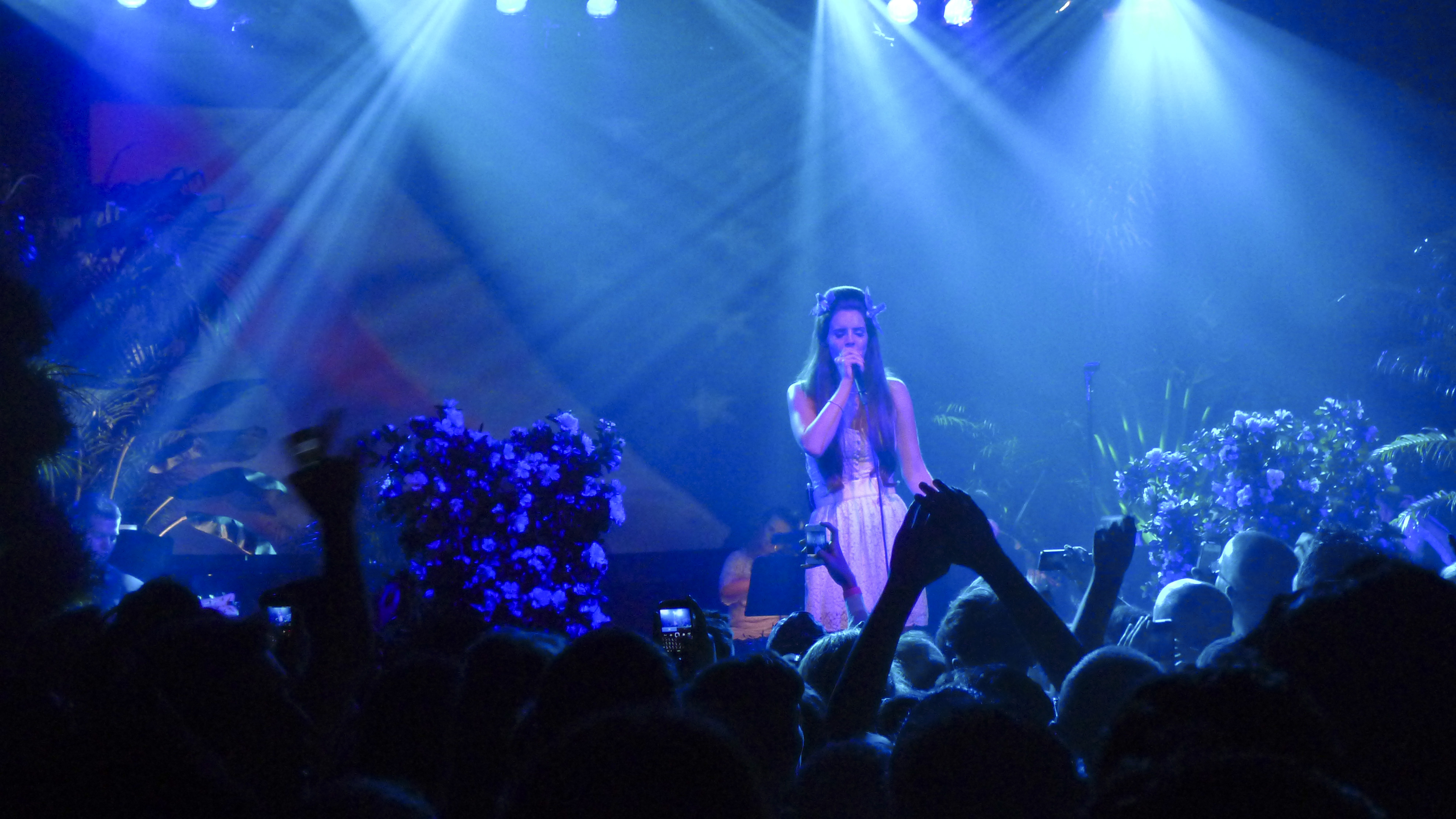
Del Rey performing in 2012

Del Rey has been labeled an "alt-pop" artist. Her works have been variously categorized as pop, rock, dream pop, baroque pop, indie pop, psychedelic rock, while incorporating trip hop, hip hop, lo-fi, and trap elements. Upon her debut release, Del Rey's music was described as "Hollywood sadcore" by some music critics. It has been repeatedly noted for its cinematic sound and its references to various aspects of pop culture; both critics and Del Rey herself have noted a persistent theme of 1950s and 1960s Americana. The strong elements of American nostalgia brought Idolator to classify her firmly as alternative pop. Del Rey elaborated on her connection to the past in an interview with Artistdirect, saying "I wasn't even born in the '50s but I feel like I was there."

Of Born to Die, AllMusic said that its "sultry, overstated orchestral pop recast her as some sort of vaguely imagined chanteuse for a generation raised on Adderall and the Internet, with heavy doses of Twin Peaks atmosphere". Del Rey's subsequent releases would introduce variant styles, particularly Ultraviolence, which employed a guitar-based sound akin to psychedelic and desert rock. Kenneth Partridge of Billboard noted this shift in style, writing: "She sings about drugs, cars, money, and the bad boys she's always falling for, and while there remains a sepia-toned mid-century flavor to many of these songs, [Del Rey] is no longer fronting like a thugged-out Bette Davis." Upon the release of Honeymoon, one reviewer characterized Del Rey's body of work as being "about music as a time warp, with her languorous croons over molasses-like arrangements meant to make clock hands seem to move so slowly that it feels possible, at times, they might go backwards".

Prior to coming to prominence under the stage name Lana Del Rey, she performed under the names Lizzy Grant, Lana Rey Del Mar, Sparkle Jump Rope Queen, and May Jailer. Under the stage name Lizzy Grant, she referred to her music as "Hawaiian glam metal", while the work of her May Jailer project was acoustic.

=== Influences ===
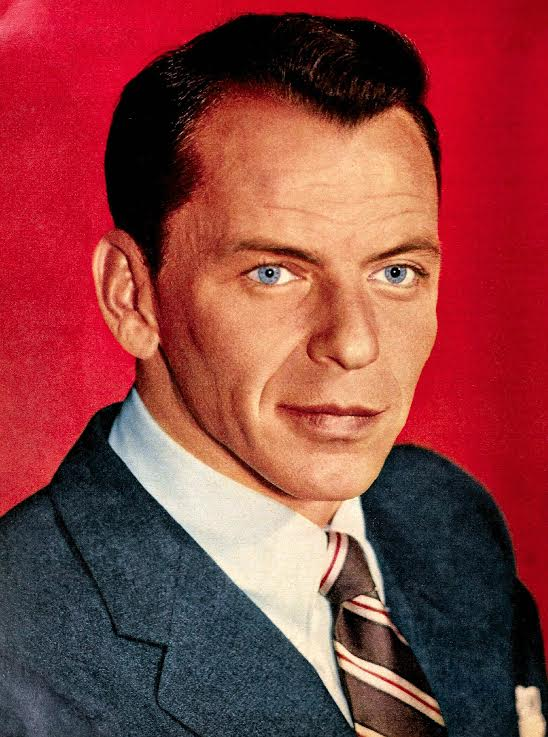
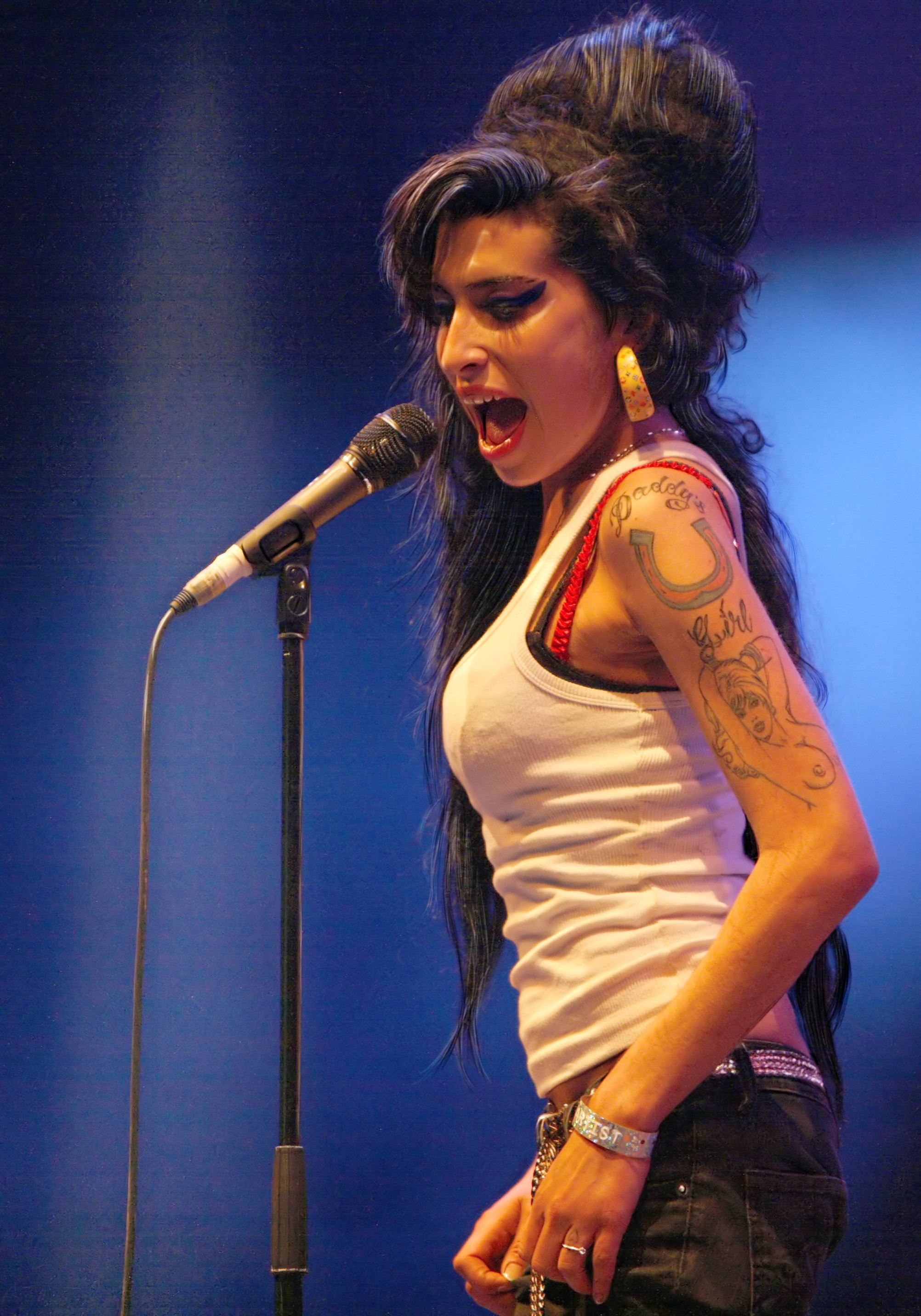
Artists from Frank Sinatra (left) to Amy Winehouse (right) have influenced Del Rey and her music.

Del Rey cites a wide array of musical artists as influences, including numerous pop, jazz, and blues performers from the mid-twentieth century, such as Andrew Lloyd Webber, Frank Sinatra, Nina Simone, Billie Holiday, Bobby Vinton, The Crystals, Brian Wilson, Nancy Sinatra, and Miles Davis. Torch singers Julie London and Julee Cruise have also served as influences. "[I really] just like the masters of every genre", she told BBC radio presenter Jo Whiley in 2012, specifically naming Nirvana, Bob Dylan, Frank Sinatra, and Elvis Presley.

Several rock and pop musicians and groups from the late-twentieth century have also inspired Del Rey, such as Bruce Springsteen, Britney Spears, singer-songwriter Lou Reed, and rock band the Eagles, as well as folk musicians such as Leonard Cohen and Joan Baez. Del Rey has also named singer-songwriter Cat Power, Hole frontwoman Courtney Love, rapper Eminem, and singer-songwriter Amy Winehouse as artists she looked up to. Del Rey has cited the soundtrack to American Beauty as a partial inspiration for her album Born to Die (2012).

Inspired by poetry, Del Rey cites Walt Whitman and Allen Ginsberg as instrumental to her songwriting. In her song "Venice Bitch", the lyric "nothing gold can stay" is also the title of a Robert Frost poem. Del Rey has cited film directors, David Lynch and Federico Fellini, and painters, Mark Ryden and Pablo Picasso, as influences and has stated actress Lauren Bacall is someone she admires. She has an interest in and was influenced by the book Lolita and the title character, as well as the films it spawned in 1962 and in 1997. She has demonstrated Lolita fashion in the past and even wrote a same-titled song, included as a bonus track on some editions of her 2012 album Born to Die.

=== Voice and timbre ===
Del Rey possesses an expansive contralto vocal range, which spans three-plus octaves and has been described as captivating and highly emotive, ranging with great ease from high notes in a girlish timbre to jazzy ornaments in her lower register. Following the release of Ultraviolence, which was recorded live in single takes and lacking Pro Tools vocal editing, critics increasingly appreciated Del Rey's vocal ability, praising her large range, increased vocal confidence, and uniquely emotive delivery. When recording in the studio, Del Rey is known for vocal multi-layering, which, as it has been noted, is difficult for her to replicate within a live setting, especially with the lack of backing singers to fill out the original vocal style. Stage fright has also been noted as a major contribution to Del Rey's struggles with live performances; however, journalists noted in 2014 her live performances had increased in confidence. Billboard deemed the Coachella debut of "West Coast" to be a "star-making performance" and lauded the singer's vocal abilities. Music critics have called her voice "smoky", "gravelly", and reminiscent of Marilyn Monroe. Upon the 2015 release of Honeymoon, her voice was compared by Los Angeles Times critic Mikael Wood to those of Julee Cruise and Eartha Kitt.

Del Rey began using lower vocals with Born to Die, claiming "people weren't taking me very seriously, so I lowered my voice, believing that it would help me stand out. Now I sing quite low... well, for a female anyway". "I sing low now, but my voice used to be a lot higher. Because of the way I look, I needed something to ground the entire project. Otherwise I think people would assume I was some airhead singer. Well, I don't think... I know. I've sung one way, and sung another, and I've seen what people are drawn to", she said on the topic.

=== Videos and stage ===
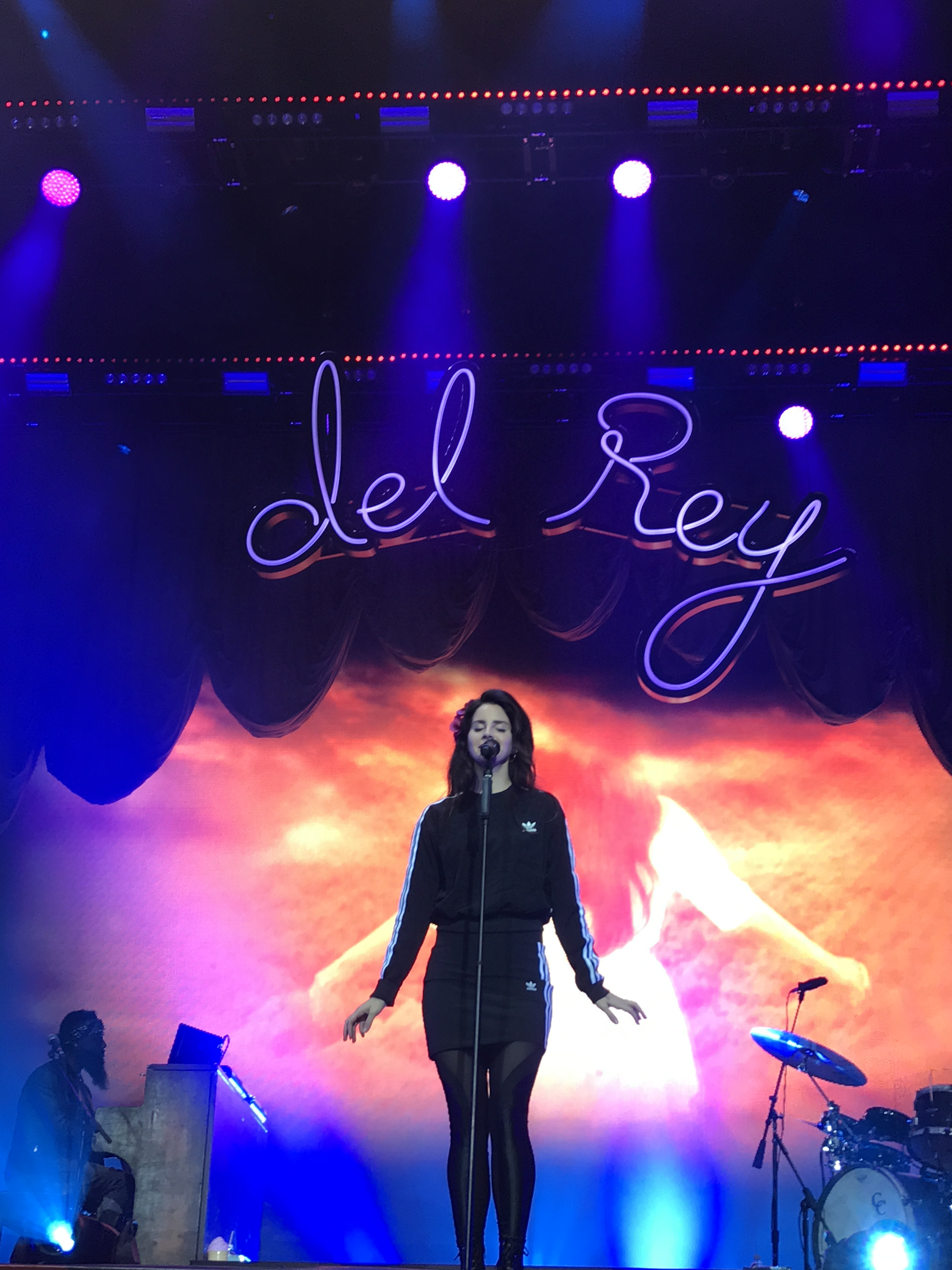
Del Rey performing at the 2017 Flow Festival

Del Rey's videos are also often characterized for their cinematic quality with a retro flair. In her early career, she recorded clips of herself singing along to her songs on a webcam and juxtaposed them alongside vintage home videos and films to serve as "homemade music videos", a style which helped gain her early recognition. After the success of these homemade videos, Del Rey had a series of high-budget music videos, including "Born to Die" and "National Anthem" (both 2012) and "Young and Beautiful" (2013). Her early videos featured her personas "bad girl" and "gangster Nancy Sinatra".

Her videos for tracks after that including "Summer Wine", "Carmen", and "Summertime Sadness" were produced off of significantly lower budgets and retained more elements of Del Rey's earlier style. The Ultraviolence era incorporated an admixture of high budget videos and self-made ones, while the Honeymoon era was almost strictly film noir-influenced professionally-shot visuals. Both eras saw some of Del Rey's homemade videos for tracks such as "Pretty When You Cry" and "Honeymoon" go unreleased due to Del Rey's opinions they were "too boring". The Lust for Life era was widely characterized for its mildly filtered vintage-inspired look with a futuristic flair. For Norman Fucking Rockwell!, Del Rey's sister, Chuck Grant, directed three videos in Del Rey's "homemade video" format, while Rich Lee directed the two following videos in a vintage but futuristic style, similar to the Lust for Life videos he directed.

Critics have noted Del Rey for her typically simple but authentic live performances. A September 2017 concert review published in The New York Times noted: "For more than an hour, Ms. Del Rey was eerily casual, singing and smiling with the ease of someone performing at singer-songwriter night at the local coffee shop." Another review by Roy Train for The Hollywood Reporter in 2014 noted "a distance in her bonhomie, obvious even from my perch at the opposite end of the stage high above the fray, the chill still palpable".

== Public image ==
=== Early reception ===
Prior to the release of her debut major label album Born to Die in 2012, Del Rey was the subject of several articles discussing her image and career trajectory. One article by Paul Harris published by The Guardian a week before the album's release noted the differences between Del Rey's perceived persona in 2008, when she performed as Lizzy Grant and posted music videos on YouTube, and in 2012, as Lana Del Rey. Harris wrote:

The internet has allowed figures like [Del Rey] to come rapidly to the fore of the cultural landscape, whether or not their emergence is planned by a record executive or happens spontaneously from someone's bedroom. It has speeded up the fame cycle. It is worth noting that the huge backlash to Del Rey is happening before her first album has even been released. This reveals a cultural obsession with the "authenticity" that fans, artists and corporations all prize above all else.

Tony Simon, a producer who had worked with Del Rey in 2009, defended her against allegations that she was a product of her record label: "To be clear, all the detractors saying she's some made-up-by-the-machine pop star are full of shit. While it's impossible to keep the businesses' hands out the pop when creating a pop star, the roots of where this all comes from are firmly inside of Lizzy Grant." In Del Rey's own words, she "[n]ever had a persona. Never needed one. Never will."

In a 2017 interview, Del Rey said, "I didn't edit myself [on Born to Die] when I could have, because a lot of it's just the way it was. I mean, because I've changed a lot and a lot of those songs, it's not that I don't relate but... A lot of it too is I was just kinda nervous. I came off sort of nervously, and there was just a lot of dualities, a lot of juxtapositions going on that maybe just felt like something was a little off. Maybe the thing that was off was that I needed a little more time or something, and also my path was just so windy just to get to having a first record. I feel like I had to figure it out all by myself. Every move was just guesswork."

=== Social views ===
Having been labeled as antifeminist by multiple sources, Del Rey stated in 2014: "For me, the issue of feminism is just not an interesting concept. I'm more interested in... SpaceX and Tesla, what's going to happen with our intergalactic possibilities. Whenever people bring up feminism... I'm just not really that interested." She also said:

For me, a true feminist is someone who is a woman who does exactly what she wants. If my choice is to, I don't know, be with a lot of men, or if I enjoy a really physical relationship, I don't think that's necessarily being anti-feminist. For me, the argument of feminism never really should have come into the picture. Because I don't know too much about the history of feminism, and so I'm not really a relevant person to bring into the conversation. Everything I was writing was so autobiographical, it could really only be a personal analysis.

In 2017, Del Rey further clarified her updated view on feminism in an interview with Pitchfork:

Because things have shifted culturally. It's more appropriate now than under the Obama administration, where at least everyone I knew felt safe. It was a good time. We were on the up-and-up... Women started to feel less safe under [the Trump] administration instantly. What if they take away Planned Parenthood? What if we can't get birth control? Now, when people ask me those questions, I feel a little differently...

After the Harvey Weinstein sexual abuse cases, she voiced her support for the Me Too movement.

She attracted criticism for a 2017 Instagram post defending herself against accusations of glamorizing abuse in part by pointing out an array of other female artists and their successes with works about "imperfect sexual relationships". Del Rey responded to the criticism that race was the theme of her post by saying that she mentioned the singers she did because she "[loves] these singers and [knows] them". She clarified that she was referencing those "who don't look strong or necessarily smart, or like they're in control etc.," when she mentioned people "who look like [her]". Del Rey attracted further criticism for briefly posting a video of looters during the George Floyd protests in May 2020.

Del Rey had been critical of U.S. President Donald Trump during his first presidency. She had described him as being a narcissist and a product of a culture of sociopathy, stating his mental state makes him devoid of any understanding of what his words and actions can lead to. In January 2021, Del Rey incited commentary for stating Trump "[didn't] know that he's inciting a riot" as a result of his "delusions of grandeur". She was critical of Kanye West in 2018 for his support of President Trump. During the first year of Trump's first presidency, Del Rey alleged she attempted to use witchcraft against Trump. In November 2020, Del Rey honored Joe Biden's election as President of the United States by covering "On Eagles' Wings".

During the release of the artwork for Chemtrails Over the Country Club on Instagram, Del Rey gained widespread press coverage for suggesting that her friends, featured on the cover, were "a beautiful mix of everything", saying that she had always been "inclusive without even trying to" throughout her career. Del Rey elaborated, saying her close friends and boyfriends had been "rappers" and addressed her critics, saying that before commenters turned it into a "WOC/POC issue", she "wasn't the one storming the capitol" and was "changing the world by putting my life and thoughts and love out there". She subsequently deleted the comments. Following criticism from media outlets, Del Rey tweeted "A woman still can't get mad right? Even when a mob mentality tries to *incite*."

=== Charity work ===
Over the years, Del Rey has supported multiple causes and made several recordings available as offerings to help support causes she believes in. Her 2019 single "Looking for America" was released in response to the August 3–4, 2019, mass shootings in El Paso, Texas, and Dayton, Ohio, with all proceeds from the song going to relief funds benefiting victims of the August shootings and the July 28, 2019, Gilroy Garlic Festival shooting. In October 2020, she donated $350,000 from the sales of her book Violet Bent Backwards over the Grass to DigDeep, a Los-Angeles-based non-profit organization, founded by George McGraw in 2014, which provides electric-pumped water for some of the most remote families and communities of the Navajo Nation. Later in December, Del Rey released a cover of "You'll Never Walk Alone" to benefit charities supported by the Liverpool F.C. Foundation.

In the early 2000s, Del Rey worked at a homeless shelter and participated in humanitarian work, including building houses at Navajo Nation.

== Legacy ==
Mural of Del Rey on The Ellison Suites in Venice, California

Del Rey's fusion of cinematic orchestration, melancholic lyricism, and vintage Americana has substantially shaped contemporary pop and alternative pop. Music critics and historians frequently point to her major-label debut, Born to Die (2012), as a watershed moment in 2010s music. Billboard credited the album with steering mainstream pop away from the brash, high-tempo EDM dominant at the start of the decade toward a slower, moodier, and hip-hop-inflected alternative pop palette, naming "Born to Die" one of the 100 songs that defined the 2010s for initiating "a sonic shift that completely changed the pop landscape". Reviewers have also praised how her confessional, poetic songwriting established a blueprint for subsequent alternative-leaning pop performers, including Lorde, Halsey, Banks, Sky Ferreira, Father John Misty, Sia, Miley Cyrus, Selena Gomez, and Taylor Swift. A broad roster of later artists across pop, indie, and R&B have likewise cited her as a primary influence on their songwriting and visual aesthetics, among them are The Weeknd, Billie Eilish, Finneas, XXXTentacion, Charli XCX, Clairo, Troye Sivan, Beabadoobee, Slayyyter, Madison Beer, BØRNS, Zella Day, Gracie Abrams, Kacey Musgraves, Daniel Seavey, Suki Waterhouse, Jesse Jo Stark, Addison Rae, Kali Uchis, Jesse Rutherford, Ethel Cain, Chappell Roan, Niall Horan, Nessa Barrett, Olivia Rodrigo, and Conan Gray.

Critics have extensively praised Del Rey's poetic approach to songwriting, noting her integration of literary allusions, melancholic storytelling, and cinematic world-building into mainstream pop. Pitchfork recognized her as one of the greatest living American songwriters, while The Guardian described her "pure female haze" as a "hallmark of the defiant female pop stars to come". In 2019, The Washington Post named her the sole musician on its "Decade of Influence" list, and Rolling Stone placed her sixth studio album, Norman Fucking Rockwell! (2019), on its updated list of the 500 Greatest Albums of All Time. In 2023, Rolling Stone ranked her at number 175 on its 200 Greatest Singers of All Time list, and Rolling Stone UK titled her the "Greatest American Songwriter of the 21st Century". Her songwriting and artistry have also drawn praise from veteran musicians and filmmakers—many of whom influenced her own work—including Bruce Springsteen, Joan Baez, Elton John, Courtney Love, David Lynch, and John Waters.

Del Rey's artistic impact has also extended into academic study and widespread digital reach. In 2022, New York University's Clive Davis Institute of Recorded Music introduced a dedicated semester-long course, "Topics in Recorded Music: Lana Del Rey", examining her songwriting craft, visual aesthetics, and influence on contemporary pop culture. Additionally, her music videos have accumulated over 12 billion combined views across YouTube and Vevo.

== Personal life ==
Del Rey has spoken openly about experiencing severe alcohol dependence during her adolescence, stating that she began drinking heavily in her early teens and was sent to Kent School, a boarding school in Connecticut, at age 14 to get sober. She has maintained sobriety since around age 18, later describing her early struggles with substance abuse in a 2012 GQ interview as "the worst thing that ever happened to me" and explaining that she turned to community outreach and music during her recovery in New York City. Del Rey has also discussed experiencing stage fright and nervousness early in her career, acknowledging in 2012 that she was "not a natural performer" following her widely criticized appearance on Saturday Night Live. In February 2020, an illness that caused her to lose her singing voice forced her to cancel the European and UK leg of her tour on doctor's orders.

=== Relationships ===
Lana Del Rey's past romantic relationships include Scottish musician Barrie-James O'Neill (2011–2014) [with whom she collaborated on "Summer Wine"], Italian director Francesco Carrozzini (2014–2015), and police officer Sean Larkin (2019–2020). In September 2024, she married Louisiana airboat tour captain Jeremy Dufrene in a bayou ceremony in Des Allemands, Louisiana.The couple first met in 2019, when Del Rey took a tour with him there. Inspired by producer Jack Antonoff's marriage, Del Rey later gave Dufrene a co-writing credit on her 2026 single "White Feather Hawk Tail Deer Hunter".

=== Religion ===
Raised Catholic, Del Rey maintains an independent approach to faith formed by early personal challenges in New York City, stating in 2011 that her belief in a divine power arose from personal survival rather than traditional churchgoing.

My understanding of God has come from my own personal experiences... because I was in trouble so many times in New York that if you were me, you would believe in God too ... I dunno about congregating once a week in a church and all that, but when I heard there is a divine power you can call on, I did. I suppose my approach to religion is like my approach to music–I take what I want and leave the rest.

In 2017, she acknowledged participating in symbolic mass rituals regarding Donald Trump, though she dismissed claims that she practiced witchcraft. In the 2020s, she aligned with Churchome, a Los Angeles megachurch led by pastor Judah Smith, featuring a sermon excerpt on her 2023 album Did You Know That There's a Tunnel Under Ocean Blvd and having Smith officiate her 2024 wedding.

== Achievements ==
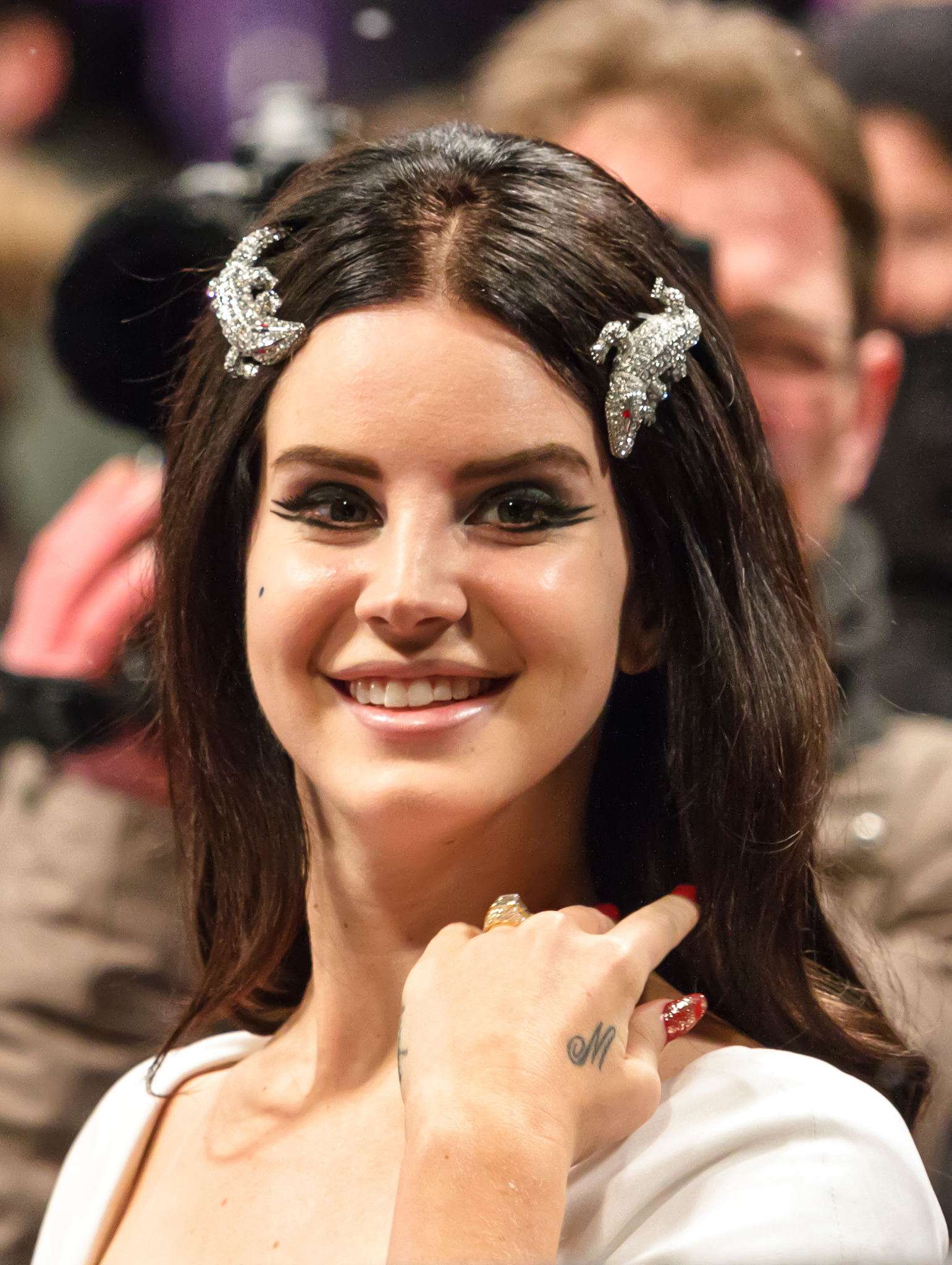
Del Rey attending the Echo Music Awards in 2013

Del Rey's breakthrough single "Video Games" earned her early critical recognition, winning the Q Award for Next Big Thing in 2011 and the Ivor Novello Award for Best Contemporary Song in 2012. That same year, she won the Brit Award for International Breakthrough Act, followed by the Brit Award for International Female Solo Artist in 2013. She won Best Alternative at the MTV Europe Music Awards three times (2012, 2015, and 2023), and earned Best Alternative at the 2023 MTV Video Music Awards for "Candy Necklace" (featuring Jon Batiste). For her soundtrack work, Del Rey won the Satellite Award for Best Original Song for "Young and Beautiful" from The Great Gatsby (2013), and received two Critics' Choice Award nominations ("Young and Beautiful" and "Big Eyes") alongside a Golden Globe nomination for Big Eyes (2014).

Del Rey has received 11 Grammy Award nominations without a win. Her first nominations came at the 56th Annual Grammy Awards (2014), where Paradise was nominated for Best Pop Vocal Album and "Young and Beautiful" for Best Song Written for Visual Media. She later earned Best Pop Vocal Album nods for Lust for Life (2018) and Norman Fucking Rockwell! (2020), with the latter also competing for Album of the Year and its title track nominated for Song of the Year. At the 66th Annual Grammy Awards (2024), she received five nominations: Album of the Year and Best Alternative Music Album for Did You Know That There's a Tunnel Under Ocean Blvd, Song of the Year and Best Alternative Music Performance for "A&W", and Best Pop Duo/Group Performance for "Candy Necklace".

Beyond competitive awards, Del Rey has received several career honors recognizing how her orchestration, melancholic lyricism, and mid-20th-century Americana aesthetic reshaped alternative pop and indie pop. At the Billboard Women in Music ceremonies, she received the Trailblazer Award in 2015 and the inaugural Visionary Award in 2023; presenting the latter, Olivia Rodrigo credited Del Rey with inspiring a generation of songwriters—including Billie Eilish, Lorde, and Rodrigo—by demonstrating "that there's beauty in their vulnerability and power in their melancholy". In December 2021, Variety presented her with its Hitmakers Decade Award, citing her role in shifting mainstream pop away from upbeat dance-pop toward slower, diaristic, and atmospherically dark songwriting. In 2023, Rolling Stone ranked her at number 175 on its "200 Greatest Singers of All Time" list, while Rolling Stone UK named her "the greatest American songwriter of the 21st century", and in May 2024, she received the Special International Award at the Ivor Novello Awards in recognition of her songwriting influence.

== Discography ==
Studio albums

- Lana Del Ray (2010)
- Born to Die (2012)
- Ultraviolence (2014)
- Honeymoon (2015)
- Lust for Life (2017)
- Norman Fucking Rockwell! (2019)
- Chemtrails over the Country Club (2021)
- Blue Banisters (2021)
- Did You Know That There's a Tunnel Under Ocean Blvd (2023)

== Written works ==
- Violet Bent Backwards over the Grass (2020)

== Filmography ==
- Poolside (2010)
- National Anthem (2012)
- Ride (2012)
- Tropico (2013)
- Hi, How Are You Daniel Johnston? (2015)
- Freak (2016)
- Tower of Song: A Memorial Tribute to Leonard Cohen (2017)
- The Kacey Musgraves Christmas Show (2019)
- Norman Fucking Rockwell (2019)

== Tours ==
Del Rey greeting fans at the MITA Festival 2023 in São Paulo

- Born to Die Tour (2011–2012)
- Paradise Tour (2013–2014)
- The Endless Summer Tour (2015)
- LA to the Moon Tour (2018)
- The Norman Fucking Rockwell! Tour (2019)
- 2023 tour
- UK and Ireland 2025

== See also ==
- List of Grammy Award winners and nominees
