= Let Me Love You like a Woman =

2020 single by Lana Del Rey

Single by Lana Del Rey

from the album Chemtrails over the Country Club
- Released: October 16, 2020
- Studio: Conway (Los Angeles); Electric Lady (New York City)
- Genre: Chamber pop
- Length: 3:20
- Label: Interscope; Polydor
- Songwriters: Lana Del Rey; Jack Antonoff
- Producer: Jack Antonoff

Lana Del Rey singles chronology
"Hallucinogenics" (2020)	"Let Me Love You like a Woman" (2020)	"Chemtrails over the Country Club" (2021)

Music video
- "Let Me Love You like a Woman" on YouTube

"Let Me Love You like a Woman" is a song by American singer-songwriter Lana Del Rey. It was released on October 16, 2020, by Interscope Records and Polydor Records as the lead single from Del Rey's seventh studio album, Chemtrails over the Country Club. The song was recorded at both Conway Recording Studios in Los Angeles and Electric Lady Studios in New York City and was written by Del Rey and frequent collaborator Jack Antonoff, who produced the song.

== Background ==
On September 1, 2020, Del Rey posted a video on Instagram of her on set filming the music video for "Chemtrails over the Country Club", the title track and second single from her seventh studio album, Chemtrails over the Country Club. In the video, she revealed that before releasing "Chemtrails over the Country Club", she would be releasing another song she had been working on, "Let Me Love You like a Woman", adding that the album would be released "soon" after the song was.

"Let Me Love You like a Woman" was released on October 16, 2020. A day prior to its release, Del Rey stated on social media that the song would be released as the lead single from Chemtrails over the Country Club. Shortly after, it was revealed that the release of Chemtrails over the Country Club (initially scheduled to be released on September 5, 2020) had been postponed to March 19, 2021, largely due to vinyl production delays caused by the COVID-19 pandemic.

On December 14, 2020, a pre-recorded performance of "Let Me Love You like a Woman" aired on The Tonight Show Starring Jimmy Fallon, marking Del Rey's first television performance in nine years, since her 2012 live performance on Saturday Night Live. A few days later, Del Rey performed the song alongside a cover of "Silent Night" with Jack Antonoff at the Ally Coalition Talent Show.

On March 28, 2023, an early demo of the song known as "Pink Champagne" leaked online. It is an outtake from Del Rey's third studio album, Ultraviolence.

== Critical reception ==
"Let Me Love You like a Woman" received generally favorable reviews, with many critics complimenting the songwriting but suggesting that the production was too similar to that of her previous work.

In a review for NME, Rhian Daly dubbed the song "a swooning ode to starting anew", praising the "gently swooning guitar licks bending over piano chords and brushed drums". In contrast, Sam Sodomsky of Pitchfork stated that the song "does not foretell a new direction" for Del Rey's music, opining that the melody "will be familiar to anyone who knows just her biggest hits" and that "the production feels like an extended coda" to the ballads of Del Rey's previous album, Norman Fucking Rockwell! (2019). Mikael Wood of Los Angeles Times suggested that the song's lyrical themes reflect Del Rey's own comments about femininity, "specifically that 'delicate' women 'get their own stories and voices taken away from them by stronger women'".

In a Rolling Stone review of Del Rey's pre-recorded performance of the song on The Tonight Show Starring Jimmy Fallon, Jon Blistein described the dive bar setting as "dingy" but complimented other aspects of it, stating that the performance of the song "had a strong and compelling aesthetic", "like all things Del Rey does".

== Music video ==
The music video for "Let Me Love You like a Woman" was released on YouTube alongside the song on October 16, 2020. The music video was filmed and created by Del Rey, using a cell phone, and features footage of Del Rey with her family and friends, interchanged with footage of her performing while touring (including footage of her performing with folk musician Joan Baez) and her singing the song while alone in her car.

== Charts ==
Chart (2020–2021)	Peak position
Belgium (Ultratip Bubbling Under Flanders)	6
Global 200 (Billboard)	142
Hot Canadian Digital Song Sales (Billboard)	45
Ireland (IRMA)	60
New Zealand Hot Singles (RMNZ)	9
Portugal (AFP)	150
Scotland Singles (OCC)	37
Sweden (Sverigetopplistan)	100
Switzerland (Schweizer Hitparade)	85
UK Singles (OCC)	87
US Adult Alternative Airplay (Billboard)	29
US Digital Song Sales (Billboard)	24
US Hot Alternative Songs (Billboard)	11
US Hot Rock & Alternative Songs (Billboard)	14

== Release history ==
Release dates and formats for "Let Me Love You like a Woman"
Region	Date	Format	Label	Ref.
Various	October 16, 2020	Digital download; streaming	Interscope; Polydor	
Russia	October 24, 2020	Contemporary hit radio	Universal	
United States	November 23, 2020	Adult alternative radio	Interscope	
