= White Dress =

2021 single by Lana Del Rey

Single by Lana Del Rey

from the album Chemtrails over the Country Club
- Released: March 19, 2021
- Studio: Henson Recording Studios (Los Angeles, CA)
- Genre: Pop
- Length: 5:33
- Label: Interscope; Polydor
- Songwriters: Elizabeth Grant; Jack Antonoff
- Producers: Elizabeth Grant; Jack Antonoff

Lana Del Rey singles chronology
"Chemtrails over the Country Club" (2021)	"White Dress" (2021)	"Tulsa Jesus Freak" (2021)

Music video
- "White Dress" on YouTube

"White Dress" is a song by American singer and songwriter Lana Del Rey from her seventh studio album, Chemtrails over the Country Club (2021).

The accompanying music video was directed by Constellation Jones and filming took place at Hicksville Trailer Palace in Joshua Tree, California.

== Background ==
Del Rey confirmed the title of the song with Interview in September 2020, stating that it would be a "defining moment" for the album: "What I like about that song is that despite all the freakiness over it, you understand exactly what it's about when it ends. I hate when I hear a song that has a great melody, but I have no idea what they're talking about."

== Music video ==
The official music video was directed by Constellation Jones. It has an official length of 5:47 and was shot at Hicksville Trailer Palace. It features a woman rollerskating, representing 19-year-old Del Rey. The video was shot in December 2020 and was intended to have Del Rey roll around on roller skates, however, the idea was scrapped due to Del Rey sustaining elbow injuries before shooting. A body double shot the roller skating scenes instead. The video was released on March 19, 2021, coinciding with the release of the song and album.

== Composition ==
Prior to the song's release, it was described as "one of the saddest in her career", which circles back to her "Lizzy Grant" days. Later, Mojo described the song as being sung in a "breathlessly rapt whisper" of being "only nineteen".

== Charts ==
Chart performance for "White Dress"
Chart (2021)	Peak position
Ireland (IRMA)	43
New Zealand Hot Singles (RMNZ)	12
UK Singles (Official Charts)	51
US Hot Rock & Alternative Songs (Billboard)	14

== Cover versions ==
American shoegaze band Drop Nineteens released a cover version of the song in 2024.
