= Hallucinogenics =

2018 song by Matt Maeson

- Lana Del Rey remix artwork

Single by Matt Maeson

from the album Bank on the Funeral
- Released: March 30, 2018; September 25, 2020 (remix)
- Length: 3:07; 3:06 (remix)
- Label: Atlantic
- Songwriter(s): Matt Maeson; James Flannigan; Lana Del Rey (remix)
- Producer(s): David Baron; Simone Felice; James Flannigan

Matt Maeson singles chronology
"Go Easy" (2019)	"Hallucinogenics" (2018)

Lana Del Rey singles chronology
"Don't Call Me Angel" (2019)	"Hallucinogenics" (2020)	"Let Me Love You like a Woman" (2020)

Licensed audio
- "Hallucinogenics" (remix) on YouTube

"Hallucinogenics" is a song by American singer-songwriter Matt Maeson. The official remix features the vocals of American singer-songwriter Lana Del Rey. The song appears on Maeson's debut album, Bank on the Funeral (2019).

== Background ==
Released on March 30, 2018, the song was written by Maeson and James Flannigan and produced by Flannigan, Simone Felice and David Baron. A music video directed by Cody LaPlant was released on March 30, 2018.

The song had success on alternative radio, reaching the top spot on several American Billboard charts.

== Remixes ==
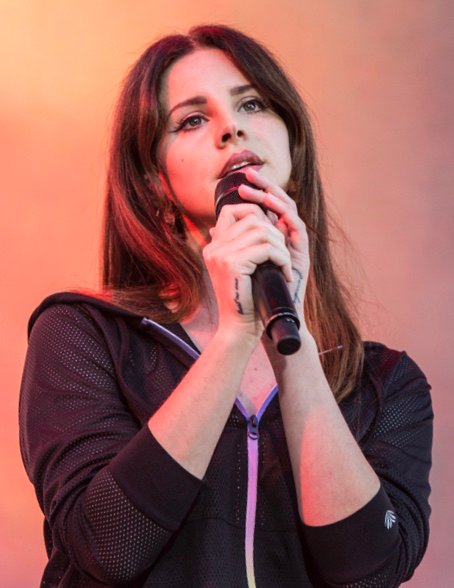
Lana Del Rey (pictured) appears on the official remix.

Upon its release, the song was followed by several remixes including a stripped version and dance/electronic remixes by Vallis Alps, Seeb, Japanese Wallpaper and Winona Oak, Ookay, Petey, and Andrelli. Additionally, Lana Del Rey appeared on a remix of the song in 2020.

=== Lana Del Rey remix ===
On September 24, 2020, Atlantic Records issued a remix of the song featured additional vocals by Lana Del Rey. The duo had previously performed the song together a year before on Del Rey's The Norman Fucking Rockwell! Tour in Oklahoma.

==== Critical reception ====
Rania Aniftos of Billboard praised the song's pairing, adding "Del Rey's ethereal vocals fit perfectly into the song's acoustic nature, trading lines with Maeson before they come together for the chorus." Wongo Okon of Uproxx gave a positive review of the remix, stating "the duo's vocals roar as they send proclamations of 'tripping on hallucinogenics' into the skies. Pushed by the breezy strings of a guitar on the track's production, the duo close out the track and bring it to a smooth and comforting end." Jon Blistein of Rolling Stone wrote "Del Rey slips easily into the song, which begins as a soft acoustic folk number before leveling up several notches with the arrival of some big drum hits and atmospheric synth touches", adding that "Del Rey and Maeson split vocal duties throughout the song and come together in harmony on the hook."

== Charts ==
=== Weekly charts ===
Chart (2020)	Peak position
Canada (Canadian Hot 100)	80
Canada Rock (Billboard)	13
New Zealand Hot Singles (RMNZ) (Lana Del Rey version)	26
US Rock & Alternative Airplay (Billboard)	1
US Hot Rock & Alternative Songs (Billboard)	13

=== Year-end charts ===
Chart (2020)	Position
US Hot Rock & Alternative Songs (Billboard)	25

== Certifications ==
Region	Certification	Certified units/sales
Canada (Music Canada)	2× Platinum	160,000^{‡}
United States (RIAA)	Platinum	1,000,000^{‡}
^{‡} Sales+streaming figures based on certification alone.
