= First Light (song) =

Single by Lana Del Rey
- Released: April 16, 2026
- Length: 3:24
- Label: Polydor; Interscope; Amazon MGM
- Songwriters: Lana Del Rey; David Arnold
- Producers: Lana Del Rey; David Arnold; Dean Reid

Lana Del Rey singles chronology
"White Feather Hawk Tail Deer Hunter" (2026)	"First Light" (2026)	"Lies" (2026)

James Bond theme singles chronology
"No Time to Die" (2020)	"First Light" (2026)

Audio video
- "First Light" on YouTube

"First Light" is the theme song to the 2026 James Bond video game 007 First Light, recorded by American singer-songwriter Lana Del Rey. She wrote and produced it with composer David Arnold, who has written music for multiple James Bond films, while Dean Reid also contributed production.

== Background and release ==
"First Light" serves as the theme for the video game 007 First Light. In 2015, Lana Del Rey submitted her song "24" for the film Spectre, but "Writing's on the Wall" by Sam Smith was chosen as that film's theme song instead. Composer David Arnold, who co-wrote the song, stated "I was so excited to work with Lana, an artist who brought elegance, atmosphere and her totally unique character to this piece, which I hope will open the world of Bond to a whole new audience." Arnold had also written songs for multiple James Bond films.

While the song released in April 2026, speculation around the release started as early as October 2025, when it was discovered that Del Rey registered the song with the American Society of Composers, Authors and Publishers. "First Light" was released as a single in Italy on April 23, 2026. The song was not included on the official soundtrack album for the game.

Arnold described "First Light" as joining "a long line of genre defining songs, each one creating a benchmark of style that adds to the magnificent heritage that is ''The Bond Song' ".

== Production and music ==
Del Rey wrote the song with Arnold. Melodye Perry sang the background vocals, Toby Pittman and David Levita played guitar, and Sean Hurley played the bass. Nicholas Dodd conducted the song, and Florian Gouello played drums.

"First Light" lasts for 3 minutes and 24 seconds. It features frequent playing of brass, strong orchestral sound, and strings throughout. Polygon described the song as sounding similar to those her album Honeymoon (2015) and described the guitar sounds as "western tinged".

== Critical reception ==
The song received mixed reviews. Polygon described it as "three-and-a-half minutes of heaven", but criticised the lyrics as trying too hard to be poetic. PC Gamer called it "definitely a James Bond theme song", describing Del Rey's voice as mushy and the lyrics as lacking depth. Gizmodo called Lana Del Rey a fitting choice for the theme and noted the song's "signature Bond-theme horns and strings".

== Personnel ==
Credits are as shown on Tidal.

- Lana Del Rey – vocals, producer, songwriter, lyricist
- David Arnold – producer, composer, lyricist, keyboard
- Dean Reid – producer, programmer, mixing engineer
- Aidan Thillmann – additional engineer, additional mixing engineer
- Caroline Whitaker – additional engineer
- Jack Mills – additional engineer
- Melodye Perry – background vocalist
- Sean Hurley – bass
- Nicholas Dodd – conductor
- Florian Gouello – drum
- John Christopher Fee – engineer
- David Levita – guitar
- Toby Pittman – guitar
- Ruairi O'Flaherty – mastering engineer
- Gianluca Massimo – mixing engineer, recording engineer
- Amy Stewart – orchestra contractor
- Isobel Griffiths – orchestra contractor
- Susie Gillis – orchestra contractor
- Wil Jones – recording engineer

== Charts ==
=== Weekly charts ===
Weekly chart performance
Chart (2026)	Peak position
Latvia Airplay (TopHit)	69

=== Monthly charts ===
Monthly chart performance
Chart (2026)	Peak position
Latvia Airplay (TopHit)	95
