= Bluebird (Lana Del Rey song) =

2025 single by Lana Del Rey

Single by Lana Del Rey

from the album Stove
- Released: April 18, 2025
- Genre: Country folk
- Length: 4:02
- Label: Interscope; Polydor
- Songwriters: Lana Del Rey; Luke Laird
- Producers: Lana Del Rey; Luke Laird; Drew Erickson

Lana Del Rey singles chronology
"Henry, Come On" (2025)	"Bluebird" (2025)	"White Feather Hawk Tail Deer Hunter" (2026)

Audio video
- "Bluebird" on YouTube

"Bluebird" is a song by American singer-songwriter, and record producer Lana Del Rey. It was released on April 18, 2025, via Interscope and Polydor Records, as the second single from her upcoming tenth studio album, Stove.

== Background ==
Del Rey released "Bluebird" as the first promotional single from her forthcoming album, following "Henry, Come On". The song was co-written with Luke Laird and co-produced by Laird and Drew Erickson, featuring a fingerpicked arrangement that reflects a continued interest in Americana and country elements. Although the album was previously referred to as Lasso and The Right Person Will Stay, its final title and release date have not been officially confirmed. She performed at Stagecoach in late April, following her 2024 Coachella headlining appearance.

== Composition ==
"Bluebird" is a sparse, fingerpicked country folk ballad that aligns with Del Rey's ongoing shift toward Americana influences, featuring acoustic guitar and harmonica. According to Nylon, the raw production highlights the song's emotionally charged lyrics, which depict the experience of a woman in an abusive relationship. The track continues Del Rey's exploration of minimalist storytelling, relying on understated instrumentation to underscore its themes.

== Critical reception ==
People noted that the lyrics and sound of "Bluebird" have drawn comparisons to The Beatles' 1968 song "Blackbird", which also uses avian imagery to convey themes of freedom and transformation. Lines such as "Blackbird singing in the dead of night / Take these sunken eyes and learn to see" and "You were only waiting for this moment to be free" reflect similar emotional territory. Jon Pareles from The New York Times, cited "Bluebird" amongst the "best new releases", praising its "relaxed waltz tempo, acoustic guitar picking, dulcet strings and an innocent warble in her voice". In June 2025, the song was listed in The New York Times list of the 10 best songs of 2025 thus far.

== Charts ==
Chart performance for "Bluebird"
Chart (2025)	Peak position
Ireland (IRMA)	86
Japan Hot Overseas (Billboard Japan)	14
Netherlands (Single Tip)	26
New Zealand Hot Singles (RMNZ)	3
Sweden Heatseeker (Sverigetopplistan)	18
UK Singles (OCC)	80
US Hot Rock & Alternative Songs (Billboard)	25
