= Chemtrails over the Country Club (song) =

Single by Lana Del Rey

from the album Chemtrails over the Country Club
- Released: January 11, 2021
- Genre: Americana • chamber pop
- Length: 4:31
- Label: Interscope; Polydor
- Songwriters: Lana Del Rey; Jack Antonoff
- Producers: Lana Del Rey; Jack Antonoff

Lana Del Rey singles chronology
"Let Me Love You like a Woman" (2020)	"Chemtrails over the Country Club" (2021)	"White Dress" (2021)

Music video
- "Chemtrails over the Country Club" on YouTube

"Chemtrails over the Country Club" is a song by American singer-songwriter Lana Del Rey. It was released on January 11, 2021, by Interscope Records and Polydor Records as the title track and second single from her seventh studio album of the same name. The song was written and produced by Del Rey and frequent collaborator, Jack Antonoff.

In a September 2020 interview with Interview magazine, Del Rey stated she chose "Chemtrails over the Country Club" as the title track of the album because the lyrics pertain to her "stunning girlfriends" and "beautiful siblings" ("who so much of the album is about"), also mentioning "wanting so much to be normal and realizing that when you have an overactive, eccentric mind, a record like Chemtrails is just what you're going to get."

== Background ==
On August 31, 2019, the release day of her sixth studio album Norman Fucking Rockwell!, Del Rey announced she had already begun work on another album. On May 25, 2020, she announced in an Instagram post that the album would be titled Chemtrails over the Country Club. The album was initially scheduled to be released on September 5, 2020, but she later revealed that the release had been postponed to March 19, 2021, largely due to vinyl production delays caused by the COVID-19 pandemic.

On September 1, 2020, Del Rey posted a video on Instagram of her on set filming a music video. In the video, she announced that the music video would be for the title track and second single from the album, "Chemtrails over the Country Club", and stated another song she had been working on, "Let Me Love You like a Woman", would be released as the lead single from the album, before "Chemtrails over the Country Club" would be released. ("Let Me Love You Like a Woman" was released on October 16, 2020.) On December 22, Del Rey posted a video on social media featuring scenes from the music video and announced that "Chemtrails over the Country Club" and its accompanying music video would be released on January 11, 2021, the same day the album would become available for pre-order.

== Critical reception ==
"Chemtrails over the Country Club" received critical acclaim. In a review for NME, Rhian Daly described the song as "swooning" and "beautiful". In two articles covering the song for Vulture, Justin Curto described the song as "one of [Del Rey's] classic dreamy love songs" and "more interesting than the middle-of-the-road lead single 'Let Me Love You Like a Woman'" but not "any more substantive", noting how Del Rey "sways and lilts through the delicate rhythm, eventually finding her way toward a glitchy bridge" but suggesting that lyrically she is "only speaking for herself" and "doesn't have much profound to say". Tom Curtis-Horsfall of GigList opined that "Where Norman Fucking Rockwell! sounded like a dying bugle call for the American Dream, 'Chemtrails over the Country Club' feels like Del Rey now wants to desperately clutch on to that forgotten world of innocence, suburbia, and naivety".

In a review of Chemtrails over the Country Club for Pitchfork, assigning the album a rating of 7.5 out of 10, Mina Takavoli described the song as "a ballad drawn directly from the Lana Del Rey vein, all honey sun, moneyed smiles, the pleasure of living lavishly." Takavoli commented on the title of the song and its subversive lyrical themes, stating "whether meant to be tongue-in-cheek, a joke, or not one at all" ("whether or not she actually believes in covert geoengineering is entirely irrelevant"), "the title's flawless alignment with the mood and mien of that moment—the conspiracy-mindedness, the radiant gloom, the fragility, and the suggestion of the type of person associated with the words 'country club'—was an act of poetry. It was remarkable to hear the bard of white American malaise suggest which delusion was gripping the nation."

== Music video ==
The music video for "Chemtrails over the Country Club" was released on YouTube alongside the song on January 11, 2021. It was directed by American film production duo BRTHR. In a review of Chemtrails over the Country Club for Pitchfork, Mina Takavoli described the music video as "Lana in a diamanté mesh mask, looking a little like Hedy Lamarr in low fidelity, glancing sweetly from the driver’s seat of a mid-century Mercedes-Benz Cabriolet", while "chemtrails dart overhead in crosshatch as Lana stares up with widened eyes."

The music video, which utilizes a visual style and setting reminiscent of 1960s Americana, begins, as Claire Shaffer of Rolling Stone describes, as "a stereotypical Lana Del Rey video", cutting between scenes of Del Rey driving a red 1930s Mercedes-Benz 500K convertible (actually a replica made by Heritage Motors in 1990), lounging with friends at a country club pool with "chemtrails" in the sky above them, putting on jewelry. Around halfway through the music video, the song, as Justin Curto of Vulture describes, fades into "a glitchy bridge", the video's aspect ratio changes, and the video quickly cuts between scenes of lemons being squeezed or bitten and Del Rey driving her car into a tornado, concluding at a scene depicting Del Rey and her friends, in a forest at night, as werewolves. Del Rey, her friends, and a wolf stand beside the car shown in the beginning of music video, which is engulfed in flames. The song begins to fade back in, as the video cuts between scenes of Del Rey in the shower, taking off her jewelry and washing blood off of herself, while a dead bird lies near her foot. The music video ends in a scene showing her friends, still presented as werewolves, going back to their homes and getting into bed.

Since its release, the music video has accumulated over 44 million views on YouTube.

== Personnel ==
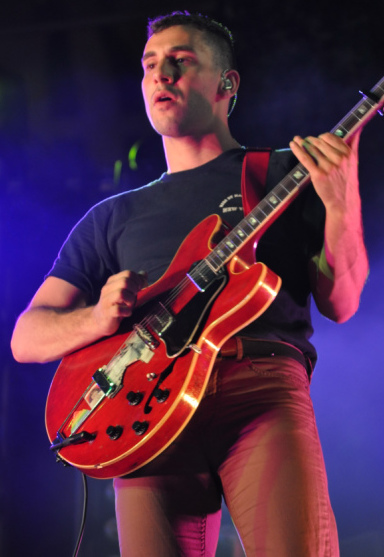
Jack Antonoff co-wrote, co-produced and played various instruments on the track.

Credits adapted from Tidal.

- Lana Del Rey – vocals, songwriter, producer
- Jack Antonoff – songwriter, producer, 12-string acoustic guitar, bass, drums, guitar, keyboards, Mellotron, piano, mixer
- Daniel Heath – strings
- Evan Smith – horn
- Laura Sisk – engineer, mixer
- John Rooney – assistant recording engineer
- Jon Sher – assistant recording engineer
- Chris Gehringer – mastering engineer

== Charts ==
Chart performance for "Chemtrails over the Country Club"
Chart (2021)	Peak position
Belgium (Ultratip Bubbling Under Flanders)	5
Global 200 (Billboard)	154
Greece (IFPI)	10
Hungary (Single Top 40)	21
Ireland (IRMA)	44
Lithuania (AGATA)	8
New Zealand Hot Singles (RMNZ)	17
Portugal (AFP)	130
Sweden Heatseeker (Sverigetopplistan)	4
Switzerland (Schweizer Hitparade)	94
UK Singles (OCC)	58
US Hot Alternative Songs (Billboard)	15
US Hot Rock & Alternative Songs (Billboard)	15

== Certifications ==
Certifications and sales for "Chemtrails over the Country Club"
Region	Certification	Certified units/sales
Australia (ARIA)	Gold	35,000^{‡}
Austria (IFPI Austria)	Gold	15,000^{‡}
Brazil (Pro-Música Brasil)	2× Platinum	80,000^{‡}
France (SNEP)	Gold	100,000^{‡}
New Zealand (RMNZ)	Platinum	30,000^{‡}
Poland (ZPAV)	Platinum	50,000^{‡}
Spain (Promusicae)	Gold	30,000^{‡}
United Kingdom (BPI)	Gold	400,000^{‡}
^{‡} Sales+streaming figures based on certification alone.

== Release history ==
Region	Date	Format	Label	Ref.
Various	January 11, 2021	Digital download; streaming	Interscope; Polydor	
Italy	January 22, 2021	Contemporary hit radio	Universal	
