= Chemtrails over the Country Club =

2021 studio album by Lana Del Rey

Studio album by Lana Del Rey
- Released: March 19, 2021
- Recorded: 2015–2016; 2019–2020
- Studios: Conway (Los Angeles); The Green Building (Santa Monica); Hampstead (London)
- Genres: Americana; folk; country folk
- Length: 45:28
- Labels: Interscope; Polydor
- Producers: Lana Del Rey; Jack Antonoff; Rick Nowels

Lana Del Rey chronology
Violet Bent Backwards Over the Grass (2020)	Chemtrails over the Country Club (2021)	Blue Banisters (2021)

Singles from Chemtrails over the Country Club
- 1. "Let Me Love You like a Woman" Released: October 16, 2020; 2. "Chemtrails over the Country Club" Released: January 11, 2021; 3. "White Dress" Released: March 19, 2021; 4. "Tulsa Jesus Freak" Released: March 26, 2021

Chemtrails over the Country Club is the seventh studio album by American singer-songwriter Lana Del Rey. It was released on March 19, 2021, by Interscope and Polydor Records. Del Rey enlisted producer Jack Antonoff as her co-producer for the majority of the album, after working with him on her previous studio album, Norman Fucking Rockwell! (2019), while previous collaborator Rick Nowels produced one of the album's tracks. The album features collaborations with Nikki Lane, Weyes Blood, and Zella Day.

Chemtrails over the Country Club is described as a folk, country folk, and Americana record. According to Del Rey, the album is about her friends and family. The album also features themes of escapism, love, heartbreak, and nostalgia, while encompassing her usual references to Americana, alongside emotions of disillusionment.

Chemtrails over the Country Club received widespread acclaim from music critics, with many comparing its sound to its predecessor. The album debuted at number one in eight countries, including the United Kingdom, becoming Del Rey's fifth number one album there. It reached the top five in twenty countries, including the United States, where it peaked at number two on the Billboard 200, becoming Del Rey's sixth consecutive top-five album in the country.

== Background ==
Lana Del Rey first announced the album in an interview with Time on August 30, 2019, the release date of her sixth studio album, Norman Fucking Rockwell!. Originally titled White Hot Forever, it was slated for a 2020 release, with Del Rey saying that the album would be released "sometime within the next 12 or 13 months". On May 25, 2020, the album's final title was revealed to be Chemtrails over the Country Club, scheduled for a September 5, 2020, release. After the release of her debut book, Violet Bent Backwards over the Grass in 2020, Del Rey held a book signing, where she revealed that the album had been postponed due to vinyl record production delays caused by the COVID-19 pandemic. Additionally, she revealed the title of the song "Dealer", revealing that she was uncertain about including it on the album. "Dealer" was not be included on Chemtrails over the Country Club, instead appearing on her next album Blue Banisters (2021).

On August 7, 2020, Del Rey posted a video on Instagram featuring a snippet of the track "Tulsa Jesus Freak", which would later be included on the album. On September 1, Del Rey posted a video on Instagram of herself on the set of the music video for the album's title track, and announced that the album's lead single would be "Let Me Love You like a Woman", further stating the album would be released "soon" after.

== Music and lyrics ==
Chemtrails over the Country Club is described as a folk, country folk, and Americana record. The majority of the album was co-produced by Del Rey, alongside Jack Antonoff, who is also the sole producer of the album's lead single, "Let Me Love You like a Woman". The song "Yosemite" was recorded during the sessions for Del Rey's fifth studio album, Lust For Life (2017), held between 2015 and 2016.

Del Rey stated "so much of the album" pertains to her "stunning girlfriends" and "beautiful siblings". She further added that, "In 2021, [Chemtrails over the Country Club] opens a sunnier chapter in [Del Rey's] controversial roman-à-clef, and folk legend Joan Baez advocates her acceptance in the pantheon", adding that the album "appears to reveal a more vulnerable Del Rey" who is "lighter on the LA menace" and "more innocently emotional" than in her previous work.

The song "Breaking Up Slowly" features a guest appearance by American singer Nikki Lane, who also co-wrote the song with Del Rey. The album closes with a cover of Joni Mitchell's "For Free", from her album Ladies of the Canyon (1970).

== Cover artwork ==
On January 10, 2021, a day prior to the release of the album's title track, Del Rey revealed the album cover and track list of Chemtrails over the Country Club on Twitter and Instagram. The cover shows Del Rey with a number of her female friends (who also appear in the title track's music video).

== Release and promotion ==
On October 16, 2020, "Let Me Love You like a Woman" was released alongside its music video as the album's lead single. Del Rey performed the song for the first time on The Tonight Show Starring Jimmy Fallon on December 14, 2020. The performance, which was pre-recorded, was her first televised performance in nine years, since her infamous appearance on Saturday Night Live in 2012. She performed the song again, as well as a rendition of "Silent Night" on at Jack Antonoff's Ally Coalition Talent Show on December 21. The following day, she posted a teaser video for the album's title track on her social media platforms, announcing its release as the second single on January 11, 2021, alongside the album's pre-order. Chemtrails over the Country Club was released worldwide on March 19, 2021. Two more singles were released from the album. The songs "White Dress" and "Tulsa Jesus Freak" were released as the album's third and fourth singles on March 19, 2021, and March 26, 2021, respectively.

== Critical reception ==
Chemtrails over the Country Club ratings
Aggregate scores
Source	Rating
AnyDecentMusic?	7.8/10
Metacritic	81/100
Review scores
Source	Rating
AllMusic	4/5 stars
The A.V. Club	C+
Consequence	B+
The Daily Telegraph	5/5 stars
Entertainment Weekly	B
The Guardian	3/5 stars
The Independent	5/5 stars
NME	5/5 stars
Pitchfork	7.5/10
Rolling Stone	4/5 stars

Chemtrails over the Country Club was met with widespread critical acclaim. At Metacritic, which assigns a rating out of 100 to reviews from professional publications, the album received a weighted average score of 81, based on 28 reviews, indicating "universal acclaim". Aggregator AnyDecentMusic? gave it 7.8 out of 10, based on their assessment of the critical consensus.

AllMusic's Fred Thomas stated Del Rey "shakes off the cocoon of her slick pop days completely" in Chemtrails over the Country Club, carrying on the nuanced songwriting of Norman Fucking Rockwell! and ensuing in her "most atmospheric" album to-date. Will Hodgkinson of The Times called the album both "beautifully executed" and "thoughtfully realised". Los Angeles Times critic Mikael Wood found Del Rey's singing reaching a "new peak" in Chemtrails; he pinpointed how her vocals move "between her airy head voice and her sultry chest voice". Rhian Daly of NME called the album "a sublime statement" that mediates on fame and romance, having the singer "at the peak of her game". Reviewing for The Independent, Helen Brown named Del Rey "a great storyteller", who consistently details "the who, what, where and when". Brown wrote that the album tones down the "lush orchestration" of its predecessor, opting for more acoustic guitar-picking, supported by "scuffs of scuzzy electric guitar and trip-hoppy hotel lobby organ".

Liam Inscoe-Jones of The Line of Best Fit complimented the album's "gorgeous" instrumentation and Del Rey's story-based songwriting. Praising the album's writing, The Observer critic Kitty Empire described it as "a record chockful of beauty and thoughtful autobiography that only a more experienced, more assured songwriter could have made". Branding it "an enchanting listen" and a "bewitching project", Clash's Robin Murray lauded the album's minimal instrumentation and the world-building of its lyrics. John Amen of PopMatters wrote, "Chemtrails makes use of a more minimal and nuanced palette than earlier albums, Del Rey distancing herself, throughout the set and to varying degrees, from her longstanding persona and familiar stylistics. In this way, she avoids collapsing into formulas or self-caricature, continuing to explore new aesthetic possibilities."

In mixed reviews, Tim Sentz, writing for Beats Per Minute, stated Chemtrails is nowhere near as sonically versatile as its predecessor and is "a coffeehouse-appropriate album that contains almost none of what made her last album transcend". Spin critic Bobby Olivier favored the "several gorgeous arrangements" of the album but felt the music is less memorable than the rest of her catalogue. He found the country and folk inspired sound "sometimes striking", but the lyrics were "uninspired" at moments. Alexis Petridis of The Guardian thought the album centers heavily on Del Rey's recurrent themes of "nostalgia, troubled fame and ne'er-do-well lovers", but appreciated the melodies of its tracks. The A.V. Club's Tatiana Tenreyro dubbed Chemtrails a sonically and lyrically inferior record to Norman Fucking Rockwell!, commenting that most of its tracks "don't stand out" and "blend together in their delicateness". Johnny of the Well, reviewing for Sputnikmusic, criticized the album's "clumsy writing, bland instrumentation, vacuous sentimentalism and hamfisted stylisation"; nevertheless, he picked "Tulsa Jesus Freak" as a highlight.

=== Year-end lists ===
Select year-end rankings of Chemtrails over the Country Club
Critic/Publication	List	Rank	Ref.
BrooklynVegan	BrooklynVegan's Top 50 Albums of 2021	27	
The Daily Telegraph	The 10 Best Albums of 2021	2	
The Fader	The 50 Best Albums of 2021	19	
The Guardian	The 50 Best Albums of 2021	40	
The Independent	The 40 Best Albums of 2021	17	
Los Angeles Times	The 10 Best Albums of 2021	5	
The New York Times	Jon Caramanica's Best Albums of 2021	7	
PopMatters	The 75 Best Albums of 2021	34	
Slant Magazine	The 50 Best Albums of 2021	4	
The Washington Post	Best Music of 2021	7	

== Commercial performance ==
Chemtrails over the Country Club debuted at number two on the US Billboard 200 chart, earning 75,000 album-equivalent units, (including 58,000 copies in pure album sales) in its first week, according to MRC Data, becoming Del Rey's seventh US top 10 debut on the chart. The album became her third chart-topper on the US Top Album Sales list, scoring the fourth-largest sales week for a vinyl album since MRC Data began tracking sales in 1991, with nearly 32,000 copies sold. In addition, the album accumulated a total of 21.19 million on-demand streams from the album's songs.

In the United Kingdom, Chemtrails over the Country Club debuted at number one on the UK Albums Chart, selling 40,000 copies in its first week and outselling the rest of the top 10 combined, becoming Del Rey's fifth UK number-one album. The album became the fastest-selling vinyl of the century for a female act in the UK, with 16,000 vinyl copies sold. In its first three days in the United Kingdom, the album sold 30,000 physical copies.

== Track listing ==
All tracks are written and produced by Lana Del Rey and Jack Antonoff, except where listed.

Chemtrails over the Country Club track listing
No.	Title	Writer(s)	Producer(s)	Length
1.	"White Dress"			5:33
2.	"Chemtrails over the Country Club"			4:31
3.	"Tulsa Jesus Freak"			3:35
4.	"Let Me Love You like a Woman"		Antonoff	3:21
5.	"Wild at Heart"			4:06
6.	"Dark but Just a Game"			3:55
7.	"Not All Who Wander Are Lost"			4:07
8.	"Yosemite"	Del Rey; Rick Nowels	Nowels	5:04
9.	"Breaking Up Slowly" (featuring Nikki Lane)	Del Rey; Nikki Lane		2:57
10.	"Dance Till We Die"			4:03
11.	"For Free" (featuring Zella Day and Weyes Blood)	Joni Mitchell		4:11
Total length:				45:28

== Personnel ==
Credits are adapted from official liner notes.

Musicians

- Lana Del Rey – vocals
- Jack Antonoff – piano (1, 2, 4, 5, 9–11), guitar (1–3, 5–7, 9–11), bass (1, 2, 4–7, 9–11), drums (1–6, 10), Mellotron (2, 5, 6, 10, 11), keyboards (2), twelve-string acoustic guitar (2, 5–7), synthesizers (3, 5, 6), Model B synth-bass (3), percussion (3, 4, 6, 10), acoustic guitar (4), electric guitar (4), slide guitar (4), Hammond B3 (4), programming (4), organ (7), Rhodes (10)
- Daniel Heath – strings (2)
- Evan Smith – horns (2, 5, 10, 11), accordion (10)
- Rick Nowels – acoustic guitar (8), keyboards (8), Mellotron (8), bass (8)
- Aaron Sterling – drums (8), percussion (8)
- Trevor Yasuda – sound effects (8)
- Nikki Lane – additional vocals (9)
- Mikey Freedom Hart – pedal steel (9), piano (11), guitar (11), Mellotron (11)
- Weyes Blood – additional vocals (11)
- Zella Day – additional vocals (11)

Producers and engineers

- Jack Antonoff – production (except 8), mixing (except 8)
- Lana Del Rey – production (except 4, 8)
- Rick Nowels – production (8)
- Laura Sisk – engineering (except 8), mixing (except 8)
- Kieron Menzies – engineering (8), mixing (8)
- Dean Reid – engineering (8), mixing (8)
- Trevor Yasuda – engineering (8)
- John Fee – engineering (8)
- John Rooney – engineering assistance (except 8)
- Jon Sher – engineering assistance (except 8)
- Chris Gehringer – mastering
- Will Quinnell – mastering assistance (4)

== Charts ==
=== Weekly charts ===
Chart performance for Chemtrails over the Country Club
Chart (2021)	Peak position
Argentine Albums (CAPIF)	6
Australian Albums (ARIA)	2
Austrian Albums (Ö3 Austria)	4
Belgian Albums (Ultratop Flanders)	2
Belgian Albums (Ultratop Wallonia)	2
Canadian Albums (Billboard)	5
Croatian International Albums (HDU)	1
Czech Albums (ČNS IFPI)	5
Danish Albums (Hitlisten)	2
Dutch Albums (Album Top 100)	2
Finnish Albums (Suomen virallinen lista)	5
French Albums (SNEP)	3
German Albums (Offizielle Top 100)	3
Greek Albums (IFPI)	3
Hungarian Albums (MAHASZ)	23
Irish Albums (Official Charts)	2
Italian Albums (FIMI)	7
Japanese Albums (Oricon)	101
Lithuanian Albums (AGATA)	4
New Zealand Albums (RMNZ)	2
Norwegian Albums (VG-lista)	3
Polish Albums (ZPAV)	1
Portuguese Albums (AFP)	1
Scottish Albums (Official Charts)	1
Slovak Albums (ČNS IFPI)	20
Spanish Albums (Promusicae)	4
Swedish Albums (Sverigetopplistan)	3
Swiss Albums (Schweizer Hitparade)	1
UK Albums (Official Charts)	1
US Billboard 200	2
US Top Alternative Albums (Billboard)	1
US Indie Store Album Sales (Billboard)	1

=== Year-end charts ===
Year-end chart performance for Chemtrails over the Country Club
Chart (2021)	Position
Belgian Albums (Ultratop Flanders)	48
Belgian Albums (Ultratop Wallonia)	93
Dutch Albums (Album Top 100)	90
French Albums (SNEP)	157
Swiss Albums (Schweizer Hitparade)	76
UK Albums (OCC)	96
US Top Current Album Sales (Billboard)	27

== Certifications ==
Certifications for Chemtrails over the Country Club
Region	Certification	Certified units/sales
Canada (Music Canada)	Gold	40,000^{‡}
Denmark (IFPI Danmark)	Gold	10,000^{‡}
France (SNEP)	Gold	50,000^{‡}
New Zealand (RMNZ)	Gold	7,500^{‡}
Poland (ZPAV)	Platinum	20,000^{‡}
United Kingdom (BPI)	Gold	100,000^{‡}
^{‡} Sales+streaming figures based on certification alone.
