= Matt Maeson =

American singer-songwriter and musician

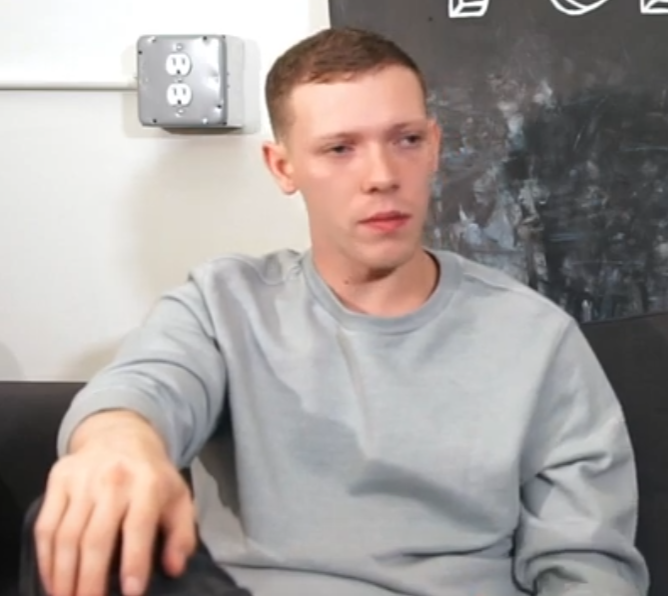
- In a 2019 interview

Background information
- Born: Matthew Steven Mason; January 17, 1993 (age 33); Norfolk, Virginia, U.S.
- Origin: Virginia Beach, Virginia, U.S.
- Genres: Alternative rock; folk
- Occupations: Singer-songwriter, musician
- Instruments: Vocals; guitar
- Years active: 2016–present
- Labels: Neon Gold; Atlantic
- Website: mattmaeson.com

Matt Maeson (born January 17, 1993) is an American singer-songwriter and musician from Virginia Beach, Virginia, signed to Neon Gold Records and Atlantic Records.

== Early life ==
Maeson was raised in Gloucester, Virginia. His parents were juvenile delinquents who later became "musicianaries", eventually playing in Christian metal bands. He was banned from listening to secular rock music on the radio until he was a teenager. Maeson started playing the guitar when he was 15. He performed at biker rallies and prisons with his parents' ministry. Maeson's uncle, who was a part of the same ministry, was murdered. Maeson's forearm tattoos "Born a sinner" and "Die a martyr" are inspired by his uncle's legacy.

== Personal life ==
Maeson became engaged in 2020. He and his wife have one child, a son named Joa, who was born in 2021.

== Career ==
In November 2016, Maeson released his debut single "Cringe". In 2018, Maeson performed at festivals such as Bonnaroo, Lollapalooza, and Forecastle. Prior to the release of his debut album Bank on the Funeral on April 5, 2019, he released two EPs, Who Killed Matt Maeson in 2017, and The Hearse in 2018. In January 2019, his song "Cringe" reached No. 7 on the Adult Alternative Songs chart. The song later spent four weeks at No. 1 on the Billboard Alternative Songs chart in August that year, the longest running number-one single by a new artist in 2019. "Cringe" was certified gold by the RIAA on February 11, 2020. In August 2020, Maeson returned to number one on the Billboard Alternative Songs chart with "Hallucinogenics", which went on to top the Billboard Rock Airplay chart one week later. Maeson was featured in Illenium's 2021 single "Heavenly Side" from their fourth full length studio album Fallen Embers. The full studio album Never Had to Leave was released on August 26, 2022.

== Discography ==
=== Albums ===
List of albums, with selected details and peak chart positions
Title	Details	Peak chart positions
Title	Details	US Heat.
Bank on the Funeral	Released: April 5, 2019; Label: Neon Gold; Format: Digital download	10
Never Had to Leave	Released: August 26, 2022; Label: Atlantic; Format: Digital download	25
A Quiet and Harmless Living	Released: September 12, 2025; Label: Atlantic; Format: Digital download	

=== Live albums ===
List of live albums with selected details
Title	Details
That's My Cue: A Solo Experience	Released: September 27, 2024; Label: Atlantic; Format: Digital download

=== Extended plays ===
List of EPs with selected details
Title	Details
Who Killed Matt Maeson	Released: March 31, 2017; Label: Neon Gold; Formats: Digital download, CD
The Hearse	Released: April 27, 2018; Labels: Neon Gold, Atlantic; Formats: Digital download, CD

=== Singles ===
Title	Year	Peak chart positions					Certifications	Album
Title	Year	US Alt.	US Rock	US AAA	CAN	CAN Rock	Certifications	Album
"Cringe"	2016	1	3	7	—	12	RIAA: Platinum; MC: 2× Platinum	Bank on the Funeral
"Go Easy"	2019	16	46	31	—	33		Bank on the Funeral
"Hallucinogenics"	2019	1	13	2	80	13	RIAA: Platinum; MC: 2× Platinum	Bank on the Funeral
"Nelsonwood Lane"	2021	—	—	—	—	—		Never Had To Leave
"Blood Runs Red"	2022	22	—	22	—	35		Never Had To Leave
"A Memory Away"	2022	—	—	—	—	—		Never Had To Leave
"Problems"	2022	—	—	—	—	—		Never Had To Leave
"Cut Deep"	2022	23	—	—	—	—		Never Had To Leave
"Downstairs"	2025	1	—	5	—	—		A Quiet and Harmless Living
"—" denotes a recording that did not chart or was not released.
