= Henry, Come On =

2025 single by Lana Del Rey

Single by Lana Del Rey

from the album Stove
- Released: April 11, 2025
- Genre: Country; western; Americana
- Length: 5:11
- Label: Interscope; Polydor
- Songwriters: Lana Del Rey; Luke Laird
- Producers: Lana Del Rey; Drew Erickson; Luke Laird

Lana Del Rey singles chronology
"Tough" (2024)	"Henry, Come On" (2025)	"Bluebird" (2025)

Audio video
- "Henry, Come On" on YouTube

"Henry, Come On" (stylized in sentence case) is a song by American singer-songwriter Lana Del Rey. It was surprise-released on April 11, 2025, by Interscope and Polydor Records, as the lead single from her upcoming tenth studio album, Stove.

== Background ==
Lana Del Rey teased a new song, "Henry, Come On", on January 18, 2024, by sharing its title overlaid on what appeared to be the single's cover art via Instagram. She stated "Henry, come on", tagging her producer Luke Laird's Instagram account. Although no release date was initially confirmed, the track was already familiar to some fans, as it had been teased more than a year earlier. When announcing the release date of her album, then-titled The Right Person Will Stay four months prior, Del Rey stated, "Happy for you to hear a few songs coming up before Stagecoach starting with Henry," referring to the song now known as "Henry, Come On". On Thursday, March 27, Del Rey took to Instagram to share the apparent single artwork without a caption. She did, however, tag several collaborators, including Laird, Dean Reid, and Drew Erickson. The image showed Del Rey gazing into the camera, dressed in white lace with styled waves and a muted red lip.

Del Rey performed at the 2025 Stagecoach Festival in Indio, California, ahead of her stadium tour in the United Kingdom and Ireland beginning in June. She headlined the Palomino Stage on April 25, with festival organizers describing her set as "a very special country set".

== Composition ==
"Henry, Come On" is an acoustic country, western and Americana ballad that highlights Del Rey's fluid vocal delivery. The song features a sparse arrangement, allowing her vocals to take center stage as she sings lyrics evocative of traditional country songs.

== Critical reception ==
Walden Green of Pitchfork named the song "Best New Track", lauding it as a "dusty, lolling ballad channeling the divine beauty of the country-western songs". He further praised Del Rey's songwriting as "delicate interweaving of the divine and the mundane". Robin Murray of Clash called it a "nuanced introduction to her country inflection point", and further praised Del Rey's "ability to frame a narrative in just a few words puts her ahead of her peers, transplanting entire screenplays into succinct pop songs". In a four star review, The Harvard Crimson called the song "an ethereal triumph, embracing both trembling vulnerability and a mature sense of disillusionment". In June 2025, Time's Jenn Pelly included the song amongst "The Best Songs of 2025 So Far", saying, "This would-be cowgirl is all Lana, chronicling her destiny alongside a tormented man with a torchy deadpan".

Critics' year-end rankings of "Henry, Come On"
Publication	List	Rank	Ref.
KTLA	The 50 best songs of 2025	—N/a	
NPR	NPR's Best Songs of 2025	—N/a	

== Charts ==
Chart performance for "Henry, Come On"
Chart (2025)	Peak position
Canada Hot 100 (Billboard)	66
Global 200 (Billboard)	72
Greece International (IFPI)	33
Ireland (IRMA)	39
Lithuania (AGATA)	79
Lithuania Airplay (TopHit)	66
Netherlands (Single Tip)	11
New Zealand Hot Singles (RMNZ)	1
Norway (VG-lista)	56
Portugal (AFP)	95
Sweden (Sverigetopplistan)	88
Switzerland (Schweizer Hitparade)	60
UK Singles (OCC)	30
US Billboard Hot 100	90
US Hot Rock & Alternative Songs (Billboard)	14

== Certifications ==
Certifications for "Henry, Come On"
Region	Certification	Certified units/sales
Brazil (Pro-Música Brasil)	Gold	20,000^{‡}
^{‡} Sales+streaming figures based on certification alone.
