= A Minute, a Moment... =

EP by Myles Smith
- Released: 23 May 2025
- Length: 43:42
- Label: It's Okay to Feel; Sony UK
- Producer: Myles Smith; Andrew Wells; Peter Fenn; Ehren Ebbage; Will Bloomfield; The Monsters & Strangerz

Myles Smith chronology
| A Minute... (2024) | A Minute, a Moment... (2025) | My Mess, My Heart, My Life. (2026) |

Singles from A Minute, a Moment...
- 1. "My First Heartbreak" Released: 25 April 2025; 2. "Gold" Released: 23 May 2025

A Minute, a Moment... is the third extended play (EP) by British singer-songwriter Myles Smith. It was released by It's Okay to Feel and Sony Music UK on 23 May 2025, serving as a follow-up to his 2024 EP A Minute....

Upon release of the EP, Smith said, "This EP has been a real labour of love, months of time, care, and everything I had to give."

== Critical reception ==
Rolling Stone UK put the EP on their "6 albums you need to hear this week" list, and asserts, "The songs on [his] new EP A Minute, A Moment... should further [his way to becoming a household name] – they’re intimate and lovingly crafted, but with an undeniable universality."

Sony Music Canada said, "Stripped back yet richly layered, A Minute, A Moment... finds Myles at his most raw and introspective, delving deep into themes of identity, love, heartbreak and self-discovery," and states that "this latest project embraces a more nuanced emotional landscape and refined sonic palette."

== Track listing ==
Disc one
| No. | Title | Writer(s) | Producer(s) | Length |
|---|---|---|---|---|
| 1. | "Made for Me" | Myles Smith; Andrew Wells; Tobias Jesso Jr. | Wells | 3:46 |
| 2. | "Gold" | M. Smith; Peter Fenn; Jesse Fink | Fenn^{[p]}; M. Smith^{[a]} | 2:44 |
| 3. | "My First Heartbreak" | M. Smith; Andrea Rocha | Fenn; Ehren Ebbage; M. Smith^{[a]} | 3:26 |
| 4. | "Someone New" | M. Smith; Wells; Jesso | Wells | 2:49 |
| 5. | "All My Life" | M. Smith; Fenn; Will Bloomfield; Phil Plested; Dan Smith; Steph Jones | Fenn^{[p]}; Bloomfield | 2:56 |
| 6. | "Dreamers" | M. Smith; Fenn; Jordan K. Johnson; Stefan Johnson; Gregory Hein | Fenn; The Monsters & Strangerz; M. Smith^{[a]} | 3:11 |

Disc two
| No. | Title | Writer(s) | Producer(s) | Length |
|---|---|---|---|---|
| 1. | "Nice to Meet You" | M. Smith; Fenn; Plested; D. Smith | M. Smith; Fenn | 2:56 |
| 2. | "Stargazing" | M. Smith; Fenn; Fink | Fenn | 2:52 |
| 3. | "Waste" (with James Bay) | M. Smith; James Bay; Fenn; Fink; Jones | M. Smith; Fenn | 3:31 |
| 4. | "Wait for You" | M. Smith; Fenn; Fink | Fenn^{[p]} | 3:21 |
| 5. | "Whisper" | M. Smith; Fenn; Fink | Fenn | 3:14 |
| 6. | "3am" | M. Smith; Fenn; Fink; Jones | M. Smith; Fenn | 2:39 |
| 7. | "Little by Little" | M. Smith; Fenn | M. Smith; Fenn | 3:21 |
| 8. | "Nice to Meet You" (featuring Lainey Wilson) | M. Smith; Fenn; Plested; D. Smith | Fenn | 2:56 |
| Total length: | | | | 43:42 |

=== Notes ===
- ^{^[p]} indicates a producer and vocal producer
- ^{^[a]} indicates an additional producer

== Personnel ==
Credits are adapted from Tidal.

=== Disc one ===
- Myles Smith – vocals (all tracks), guitar (tracks 1, 3, 4, 6), background vocals (2, 5), acoustic guitar (5)
- Michael Freeman – mixing
- Joe LaPorta – mastering
- Andrew Wells – bass, drums, percussion, piano, synthesizer, engineering (1, 4); guitar (1); electric guitar, glockenspiel (4)
- Quentin Andrianasitera – engineering assistance (1, 4)
- Tobias Jesso Jr. – acoustic guitar (1)
- Peter Fenn – bass, guitar, programming, engineering (2, 5, 6); background vocals, keyboards (2, 5); synthesizer (2), drums (5, 6), piano (6)
- Jesse Fink – background vocals, guitar (2)
- Lucas Tredrea – background vocals (2)
- Ehren Ebbage – bass, guitar, piano, engineering (3)
- James Wells – percussion, engineering (3)
- Daniel Chae – performance arrangement, strings (3)
- Daniel Said – drums (3)
- Will Bloomfield – background vocals, bass, drums, guitar, keyboards, programming (5)
- Dan Smith – background vocals (5)
- Phil Plested – background vocals (5)
- Steph Jones – background vocals (5)
- Madison Claridge – engineering (5)
- Robert Sellens – engineering (5)
- Stefan Johnson – bass, drums, piano, programming, engineering (6)
- Jordan K. Johnson – bass, drums, piano, programming (6)
- Pierre-Luc Rioux – guitar (6)
- Brady Wortzel – engineering assistance (6)

=== Disc two ===
- Myles Smith – vocals (all tracks), background vocals (all tracks); acoustic guitar, electric guitar (5)
- Michael Freeman – mixing
- Joe LaPorta – mastering
- Peter Fenn – piano, programming, engineering (all tracks); background vocals (1–6, 8), percussion (1–4, 6, 8), acoustic guitar (1, 3–6, 8), bass (1, 3–5, 7, 8), synthesizer (2–7), guitar (2, 7), electric guitar (3, 4), drums (4), keyboards (5)
- Dan Smith – background vocals (1, 5, 8); keyboards, piano (5)
- Lily Belknap Honingberg – fiddle (1, 6, 8), violin (6)
- Ramera Abraham – additional engineering (1, 8)
- Phil Plested – background vocals (1, 8)
- Jesse Fink – background vocals (2, 3, 6)
- Dominic Martinez – background vocals (2)
- Haley Evans – background vocals (2)
- Kyle McLeod – background vocals (2)
- Steph Jones – background vocals (3, 6, 8)
- James Bay – background vocals, electric guitar (3)
- Kiel Feher – drums (3)
- Mike Horner – engineering (4)
- Lainey Wilson – vocals (8)

== Charts ==
Chart performance for A Minute, a Moment...
| Chart (2025–2026) | Peak position |
|---|---|
| Australian Albums (ARIA) | 91 |
| French Albums (SNEP) | 185 |
| New Zealand Albums (RMNZ) | 39 |
| Norwegian Albums (VG-lista) | 80 |

== Certifications ==
Certifications for A Minute, a Moment...
| Region | Certification | Certified units/sales |
|---|---|---|
| France (SNEP) | Gold | 50,000^{‡} |
| New Zealand (RMNZ) | Gold | 7,500^{‡} |
| Norway (IFPI Norway) | Gold | 10,000^{‡} |
| United States (RIAA) | Gold | 500,000^{‡} |
^{‡} Sales+streaming figures based on certification alone.
