= Call It Rhythm and Blues/Baby, Let Me In =

"Call It Rhythm and Blues"/"Baby, Let Me In"

Single by The Basics
- Released: 20 August 2004
- Genre: Rock; pop
- Length: 3:04 ("Call It Rhythm and Blues"); 2:13 ("Baby, Let Me In")
- Label: Independent
- Songwriter: Kris Schroeder – Wally de Backer (both songs)
- Producers: The Basics, Matthew Gearing-Thomas

The Basics singles chronology
"Call It Rhythm and Blues" / "Baby, Let Me In" (2004)	"Just Hold On" (2007)

"Call It Rhythm and Blues"/"Baby, Let Me In" is a single release by Australian rock and roll band The Basics. The single, featuring two non-album tracks, was the band's follow-up to their debut album Get Back; the band had toured heavily around Australia in the interim. The single was released on 20 August 2004, and features the band's original line-up of Kris Schroeder, Wally de Backer, and Michael Hubbard, although Hubbard had departed the band in June 2004, after the completion of the recording. Tim Heath had since joined the band on a permanent basis; hence, "Call It Rhythm and Blues/Baby, Let Me In" was the last Basics release to feature Michael Hubbard in any capacity.

== Background ==
In mid-2003, Schroeder and De Backer were preparing material for a follow-up album to 2003's Get Back. The pair amassed twenty songs for potential use, including "Inside Your Walls", "I Loved U, U Left Me", "Don't Ask Me Why", and "I'm Gonna Tell Ya 'Bout a Girl". In 2003, the band recorded demos of these four tracks - these recordings would eventually be released on the 2013 anthology Leftovers.

In early 2004, the band recorded two tracks at Metropolis Studios, Melbourne - out of the band's backlog of twenty unused songs, "Call It Rhythm and Blues" and "Baby, Let Me In" were nominated for recording by producer Matthew Gearing-Thomas.

Where Get Back was recorded and mixed in mono, "Call It Rhythm and Blues/Baby, Let Me In" was the first Basics release to make use of stereo mixing. From this point forward, every release by the band would use stereo sound. Like on Get Back, the Basics served as producers for this release, this time alongside Matthew Gearing-Thomas, who also engineered and mixed the recording. The album was mastered by John Cochrane. In keeping with the original cover art for Get Back, which alludes to the Beatles' debut album, the artwork for "Call It Rhythm and Blues"/"Baby, Let Me In" is an homage to the cover of the Beatles' second album, With the Beatles. The black and white photograph, showing the band members in darkness with faces half lit by harsh light, was taken by Melbourne photographer James Bryans.

== Release ==
The single was never officially released - rather, independently produced pressings of it were sold as merchandise at live shows.

"Call It Rhythm and Blues" has proven an enduring live number in the band's repertoire. A live rendition of the song recorded in 2007 at the Esplanade Hotel, St. Kilda appears on the band's 2007 EP Lookin' Over My Shoulder - in addition to three core members Schroeder, De Backer, and Heath, the recording also features occasional touring keyboardist, David Bramble. The same recording was favoured over the 2004 studio recording for inclusion on the 2012 compilation, Ingredients. The song was also recorded as the closing number on 2013 live album and concert video, My Brain's Off (And I Like It).

In late 2008, while recording their third album Keep Your Friends Close, the Basics attempted a new recording of "Baby, Let Me In". This version featured Schroeder playing drums, and Heath playing a Farfisa keyboard, as well as electric guitar. The song was ultimately not used for the album.

The original studio recording of "Baby, Let Me In" was re-issued on the 2013 rarities compilation, Leftovers. Additionally, the compilation included an instrumental mix of the 2008 re-recording.

== Track listing ==
All songs credited to Schroeder-De Backer.

No.	Title	Lead vocals	Length
1.	"Call It Rhythm and Blues"	Schroeder	3:04
2.	"Baby, Let Me In"	De Backer	2:13

== Personnel ==
The Basics

- Kris Schroeder – lead and backing vocals, bass guitar.
- Wally de Backer – lead and backing vocals, drums, maracas on track 2.
- Michael Hubbard – backing vocals, electric guitar.

Production

- Matthew Gearing-Thomas – co-producer, recording and mix engineer
- John Cochrane – mastering engineer
- James Bryans – photography for album cover
