= Wait for You =

Wait for You may refer to:

- Wait for You (EP), a 2010 EP by The Basics
- "Wait for You" (Elliott Yamin song), 2007
- "Wait for You" (Tom Walker song), 2020
- "Wait for You" (Myles Smith song), 2024
- "Wait for You", a song by 7eventh Time Down from their 2013 album Just Say Jesus
- "Wait for You", a song by Chris Brown song from his 2012 album Fortune
- "Wait for You", a song by Nelly Furtado from her 2006 album Loose
- "Wait for You", a 2019 song by Maelyn Jarmon
- "Wait for You", a song by Odette from her 2021 album Herald
- "Wait for You", a song by Sugababes from their 2010 album Sweet 7

== See also ==
- "Wait for U", a 2022 song by Future
