= My Mess, My Heart, My Life =

My Mess, My Heart, My Life.

Studio album by Myles Smith
- Released: 19 June 2026
- Length: 45:54
- Labels: It's Okay to Feel; Sony UK
- Producers: Ammo; Will Bloomfield; Peter Fenn; Jesse Fink; Oscar Görres; Gabe Simon; Myles Smith

Myles Smith chronology
A Minute, a Moment... (2025)	My Mess, My Heart, My Life. (2026)

Singles from My Mess, My Heart, My Life.
- 1. "Stay (If You Wanna Dance)" Released: 26 September 2025; 2. "Drive Safe" Released: 6 February 2026; 3. "My Mess" Released: 10 April 2026; 4. "Hold Me in the Dark" Released: 8 May 2026; 5. "Heaven" Released: 17 June 2026

My Mess, My Heart, My Life. is the debut studio album by the British singer-songwriter Myles Smith. It was announced on 20 March 2026 and released on 19 June 2026.

The album includes "Stargazing" and "Nice to Meet You" from A Minute... (2024) and "Gold" from A Minute, a Moment... (2025).

The album will be supported with an English and Irish arena tour in November 2026.

On 30 April 2026, Myles announced he would push the release date back by a week from its original date of 12 June 2026.

== Reception ==
Critical reception to the album was mixed. Alexis Petridis from The Guardian gave the album 2 out of 5 stars, saying "how indebted Smith still is to the artists he started out covering", referencing Mumford & Sons, Coldplay and Ed Sheeran. Petridis also called the album "faceless and formulaic", adding, "As it is, it's hard to see what Smith is actually bringing to the party, beyond an amalgamation of his favourite artists".

Elise Ryan from SFGate gave the album 3.5/5, saying, "Smith is at his best, here, when he is vulnerable and direct — building out the character behind the emotional lyrics that brought his ascension."

== Track listing ==
My Mess, My Heart, My Life.
No.	Title	Writer(s)	Producer(s)	Length
1.	"My Mess"	Myles Smith; Griff Clawson; Steph Jones; Sam Roman; Jesse Fink; Peter Fenn	M. Smith; Fenn^{[p]}	3:11
2.	"Hold Me in the Dark"	M. Smith; Philip Plested; Jamie Scott; Gabe Simon	M. Smith; Simon; Fenn^{[a]}^{[v]}; Carrie K^{[a]}	3:17
3.	"Hate You"	M. Smith; Clawson; Roman; Alexander Izquierdo; Michael Pollack; Fink; Fenn	M. Smith; Fenn^{[p]}; Clawson^{[a]}	3:16
4.	"Grandma's Place"	M. Smith; Simon	M. Smith; Simon; Fenn^{[a]}^{[v]}	3:31
5.	"Mary's Song"	M. Smith; Clawson; Jones; Roman; Pollack; Fink; Fenn	M. Smith; Fenn^{[p]}; Clawson^{[a]}	2:31
6.	"Sertraline"	M. Smith; Mikky Ekko; Jones; Simon	M. Smith; Simon; Fenn	3:16
7.	"Drive Safe" (with Niall Horan)	M. Smith; Plested; Jones; Will Bloomfield; Fink; Fenn; Niall Horan	Fenn^{[p]}; Bloomfield	3:21
8.	"Heaven"	M. Smith; Fink; Fenn; Joshua Coleman	M. Smith; Fenn^{[p]}; Ammo	3:10
9.	"Dying Days"	M. Smith; Dan Smith; Plested; Fenn	M. Smith; Fenn	3:22
10.	"Lifetime"	M. Smith; Plested; Cleo Tighe; Izquierdo; Clawson; Fenn	M. Smith; Fenn^{[p]}	3:12
11.	"Dublin Lights"	M. Smith; Tighe; Izquierdo; Fenn; Ed Sheeran; Steve Mac	M. Smith; Fenn	2:09
12.	"Stargazing"	M. Smith; Fink; Fenn	Fenn	2:52
13.	"Nice to Meet You"	M. Smith; D. Smith; Plested; Fenn; Donna Lewis	M. Smith; Fenn	2:56
14.	"Stay (If You Wanna Dance)"	M. Smith; Ekko; Rami Yacoub; Oscar Görres	Görres	3:06
15.	"Gold"	M. Smith; Fink; Fenn	Fenn^{[p]}; M. Smith^{[a]}	2:44
Total length:				45:54

=== Note ===
- ^{^[p]} signifies a producer and vocal producer.
- ^{^[a]} signifies an additional producer.
- ^{^[v]} signifies a vocal producer.

== Personnel ==
Credits are adapted from Tidal.

=== Musicians ===
- Myles Smith – vocals, background vocals (all tracks); acoustic guitar (track 6)
- Peter Fenn – piano (1–3, 5, 9–13), acoustic guitar (1, 2, 5, 7, 9–11, 13), mandolin (1, 2), background vocals (1, 3, 5, 7–13, 15), bass (1, 3, 5, 7–11, 13, 15), synthesizer (1, 3, 7, 9, 12, 15), electric guitar (1, 7), programming (2, 3, 5–13, 15), guitar (3, 6, 12, 15), drums (3, 10), percussion (7, 11–13), sound effects (9), banjo (11), keyboards (15)
- Jesse Fink – background vocals (1, 3, 5, 7, 8, 12, 15), guitar (15)
- Griff Clawson – background vocals (1, 3), bass (3, 5); acoustic guitar, piano, programming (5)
- Sam Romans – background vocals (1, 3)
- Lily Honigberg – fiddle (1, 4, 6, 8, 9, 13), strings (8)
- Steph Jones – background vocals (1, 5–7)
- Keyhan Kamelian – piano (1, 10)
- Gabe Simon – background vocals (2, 4, 6, 11); drums, programming (2, 4, 6); bass, electric guitar, synthesizer (2, 4); acoustic guitar, mandolin, percussion (2, 6); bouzouki, Hammond organ, horn (2); piano (4, 6); guitar, organ, strings (4)
- Phil Plested – background vocals (2, 7, 13)
- Carrie K – drums (2, 10); background vocals, percussion (2)
- Jamie Scott – acoustic guitar, background vocals, piano (2)
- Michael Pollack – background vocals (3, 5)
- Alexander Izquierdo – background vocals (3, 11)
- Mikky Ekko – background vocals (6, 14)
- Will Bloomfield – acoustic guitar, bass, percussion, programming, synthesizer (7)
- Niall Horan – vocals, background vocals (7)
- Kiel Feher – drums (8, 9)
- Iona Reid – piano (8), fiddle (11)
- Ammo – acoustic guitar, background vocals, piano, programming (8)
- Deza – background vocals (9)
- Davide Rossi – violin, viola, cello, performance arrangement (10)
- Cleo Tighe – background vocals (11)
- Eoin Griffin – banjo (11)
- Catherine McGoldrick – flute (11)
- John James Devine – uilleann pipes, whistles (11)
- Dominic Martinez – background vocals (12)
- Haley Evans – background vocals (12)
- Kyle McLeod – background vocals (12)
- Dan Smith – background vocals (13)
- Oscar Görres – background vocals, banjo, bass, drums, guitar, keyboards, mandolin, piano, programming (14)
- Rami Yacoub – background vocals (14)
- Lucas Tredrea – background vocals (15)

=== Technical ===
- Peter Fenn – engineering (1–13, 15)
- Gabe Simon – engineering (2, 4, 6)
- Ishaan Nimkar – engineering (2)
- Maddie Harmon – engineering (2), engineering assistance (4, 6)
- Griff Clawson – engineering (3, 5)
- Mike Horner – engineering (3, 5)
- Madison Claridge – engineering (7)
- Martin Hannah – engineering (7)
- Robert Sellens – engineering (7)
- Will Bloomfield – engineering (7)
- Jake Stainer – engineering (8, 10, 11)
- Ammo – engineering (8)
- Davide Rossi – engineering (10)
- Oscar Görres – engineering (14)
- Federica Cottone – additional engineering (2)
- Michael Freeman – mixing (1–13)
- Alex Ghenea – mixing (14)
- Joe LaPorta – mastering

== Charts ==
Chart performance for My Mess, My Heart, My Life
Chart (2026)	Peak position
Australian Albums (ARIA)	41
Austrian Albums (Ö3 Austria)	63
Belgian Albums (Ultratop Flanders)	27
Belgian Albums (Ultratop Wallonia)	24
Canadian Albums (Billboard)	61
Dutch Albums (Album Top 100)	28
French Albums (SNEP)	53
German Albums (Offizielle Top 100)	33
German Pop Albums (Offizielle Top 100)	12
Irish Albums (Official Charts)	48
Norwegian Albums (IFPI Norge)	68
Scottish Albums (Official Charts)	2
Swiss Albums (Schweizer Hitparade)	22
UK Albums (Official Charts)	2
US Billboard 200	135
US Americana/Folk Albums (Billboard)	10
US Top Rock & Alternative Albums (Billboard)	36

== Certifications ==
Certifications for My Mess, My Heart, My Life
Region	Certification	Certified units/sales
Norway (IFPI Norway)	Platinum	20,000^{‡}
United Kingdom (BPI)	Silver	60,000^{‡}
^{‡} Sales+streaming figures based on certification alone.
