= Spirit level (disambiguation) =

A spirit level is an instrument used to determine whether a surface is exactly horizontal or vertical.

Spirit level can also refer to:

- Engineer's spirit level, a specialised instrument used to level machinery
- Spirit Level, Australian record label
- The Spirit Level (poetry collection), a 1996 poetry collection by Seamus Heaney
- The Spirit Level (Wilkinson and Pickett book), a 2009 book by Richard G. Wilkinson and Kate Pickett
- Spirit levelling, a surveying technique
