= In the Rude! =

Live album by The Basics
- Released: 21 May 2017
- Recorded: 29 December 2016
- Venue: The Howler, Brunswick
- Genre: Rock, alternative
- Length: 42:02
- Label: The Three Basics

The Basics chronology
| The Age of Entitlement (2015) | In the Rude! (2017) | B.A.S.I.C. (2019) |

Singles from In the Rude!
- 1. "With This Ship" Released: 21 April 2017; 2. "Bitten by the Same Bug" Released: 16 May 2017

Alternate cover
- Black album art

In the Rude! is the third live album by The Basics. It was released on 21 May 2017. The release date coincides with band member Wally De Backer's 37th birthday. The album commemorates the band's 15-year anniversary since their formation in 2002.

In the Rude! was recorded live at The Howler in Brunswick, Melbourne on 29 December 2016.

Two versions of the album artwork have been released, each with a different colour theme and containing different photographs taken by Melbourne photographer Barry C. Douglas.

The track "With This Ship" was released as a single, prior to the release of the album. It was accompanied by a live music video recorded by Barry C. Douglas at the concert from which the album is recorded at, with animated overlay from the original 2009 studio film clip by Matt Arnold.

The second single from the album, "Bitten by the Same Bug", was released on 16 May 2017. It was accompanied by a music video clip filmed and directed by Barry C. Douglas, and starring Michael Bennetto with live footage excerpts from the Howler gig.

== Track listing ==
| No. | Title | Length |
|---|---|---|
| 1. | "Roundabout" | 3:07 |
| 2. | "Memory Lane" | 3:21 |
| 3. | "So Hard for You" | 2:50 |
| 4. | "Bitten by the Same Bug" | 3:47 |
| 5. | "Time Poor" | 3:13 |
| 6. | "With This Ship" | 3:10 |
| 7. | "To Think of You" | 3:05 |
| 8. | "I Could Go On" | 3:45 |
| 9. | "Have Love, Will Travel" | 2:57 |
| 10. | "Yeah, Yeah" | 3:53 |
| 11. | "Home Again" | 4:10 |
| 12. | "Rattle My Chain" | 4:44 |

== Charts ==
| Chart (2017) | Peak position |
|---|---|
| 100% Independent Albums Chart (AIR) | 5 |
