= The Lucky Country (EP) =

EP by The Basics
- Released: 7 November 2014
- Recorded: March–April 2014
- Studio: Abbey Road
- Genre: Rock
- Length: 13:58
- Label: Origin

The Basics chronology
Wait for You (2010)	The Lucky Country (2014)

The Lucky Country is the fifth extended play by Australian rock band, the Basics. It was released, both digitally and on CD in stores, on 7 November 2014. The EP was recorded at Abbey Road Studios from 28 March to 2 April 2014, at the same time as the follow-up studio album, The Age of Entitlement. Two of the EP's tracks, "Tunaomba Saidia" and "Good Times, Sunshine!", also appear on that album.

The music video for the title track debuted via the Facebook page for non-profit organisation, GetUp! Australia. Following its release the group embarked on a national tour.

== Track listing ==
All tracks are written by Kristen J Schroeder, unless otherwise noted

No.	Title	Length
1.	"The Lucky Country"	4:00
2.	"Tunaomba Saidia" (Schroeder, Timothy Heath)	3:36
3.	"Operation Sovereign Basics"	1:02
4.	"Good Times, Sunshine!" (Schroeder, Wally de Backer)	2:36
5.	"Beatrix Kiddo" (Schroeder, de Backer)	2:42
