= Stay (If You Wanna Dance) =

2025 single by Myles Smith

Single by Myles Smith

from the album My Mess, My Heart, My Life.
- Released: 26 September 2025
- Genre: Pop
- Length: 3:06
- Label: It's OK to Feel, Sony
- Songwriters: Myles Smith; Mikky Ekko; Oscar Görres; Rami Yacoub
- Producer: Oscar Görres

Myles Smith singles chronology
"Gold" (2025)	"Stay (If You Wanna Dance)" (2025)	"Drive Safe" (2026)

"Stay (If You Wanna Dance)" is a song by British singer-songwriter Myles Smith. It was released on 26 September 2025.

About the single, Smith said: "This song is about escaping the cycle that makes life feel smaller than it really is. At its heart, it's about connection, freedom, and choosing to live for now.

== Reception ==
Robin Murray from Clash said the single "displays an upbeat side to his temperament, a neat slice of frisky pop music just right for the weekend."

== Charts ==
=== Weekly charts ===
Weekly chart performance
Chart (2025–2026)	Peak position
Argentina Anglo Airplay (Monitor Latino)	17
Austria Airplay (IFPI)	2
Belgium (Ultratop 50 Flanders)	9
Belgium (Ultratop 50 Wallonia)	13
Canada Hot AC (Billboard)	31
CIS Airplay (TopHit)	144
Croatia International Airplay (Top lista)	38
Czech Republic Airplay (ČNS IFPI)	91
Denmark Airplay (Tracklisten)	10
Ecuador Anglo Airplay (Monitor Latino)	7
Estonia Airplay (TopHit)	23
France Airplay (SNEP)	39
Germany Airplay (BVMI)	4
Italy Airplay (EarOne)	13
Latvia Airplay (LaIPA)	12
Lithuania Airplay (TopHit)	9
Malta Airplay (Radiomonitor)	5
Netherlands (Dutch Top 40)	9
Netherlands (Single Top 100)	68
Netherlands Airplay (Radiomonitor)	8
New Zealand Hot Singles (RMNZ)	8
North Macedonia Airplay (Radiomonitor)	6
Poland (Polish Airplay Top 100)	40
Portugal Airplay (AFP)	25
Romania Airplay (TopHit)	117
Serbia Airplay (Radiomonitor)	9
Slovakia Airplay (ČNS IFPI)	12
Slovenia Airplay (Radiomonitor)	4
Spain Airplay (Promusicae)	11
South Africa Airplay (TOSAC)	11
Sweden Airplay (Radiomonitor)	8
Switzerland Airplay (IFPI)	8
UK Singles (Official Charts)	32
Uruguay Anglo Airplay (Monitor Latino)	6
US Adult Pop Airplay (Billboard)	34
US Hot Rock & Alternative Songs (Billboard)	17

=== Monthly charts ===
Monthly chart performance
Chart (2025–2026)	Peak position
Estonia Airplay (TopHit)	28
Lithuania Airplay (TopHit)	16

=== Year-end charts ===
Year-end chart performance
Chart (2025)	Position
Estonia Airplay (TopHit)	177

== Certifications ==
Region	Certification	Certified units/sales
United Kingdom (BPI)	Silver	200,000^{‡}
^{‡} Sales+streaming figures based on certification alone.
