= Fractured Heart =

Interactive sculpture

Coordinates: 35.283°S 149.121°E

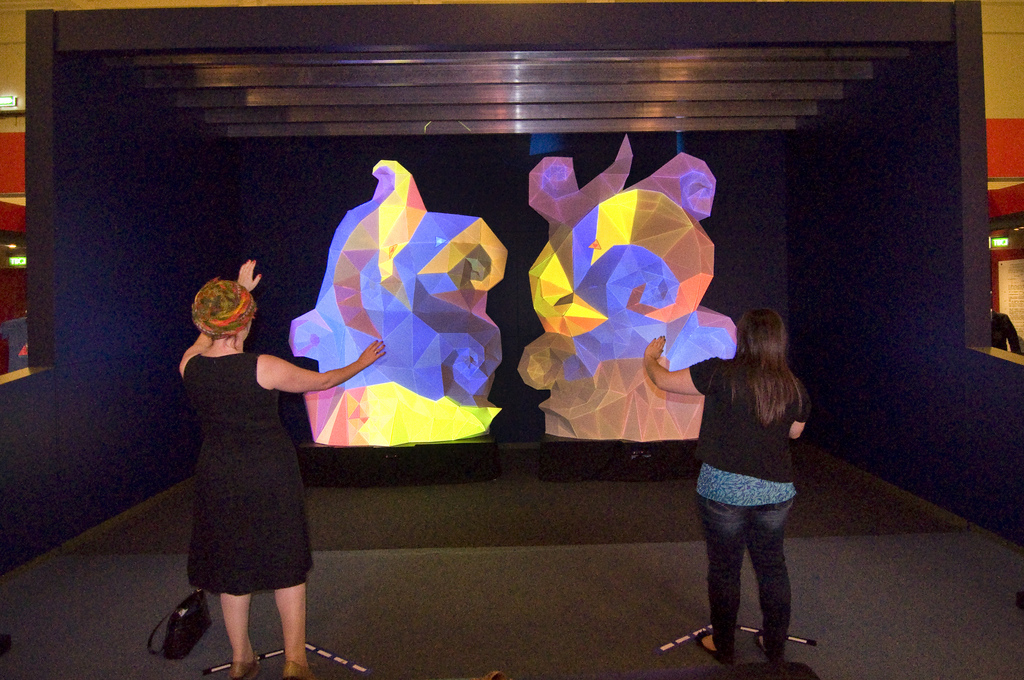
- Artist: illuminart in collaboration Gotye
- Year: 2012
- Location: National Film and Sound Archive, Canberra

Fractured Heart is an interactive sound and light sculpture designed and built by illuminart in collaboration with Gotye (Wouter 'Wally’ de Backer). It was first presented as the backdrop to his live performance of Somebody That I Used to Know with Kimbra at the 2011 ARIA Awards. The sculpture used mapped animated projections based on the music video that changed in time with Gotye's performance.

Following the ARIA Awards, illuminart redesigned 'Fractured Heart' as a separate interactive light and sound sculpture for Vivid Sydney – A Festival of Light, Music & Ideas, in 2012. According to Gotye, the design is loosely based on taking fractal elements of an illustration of a two-part broken heart, created by his father and included in the Making Mirrors album artwork. People can interact with the sculpture through physical movement, using their body and hand gestures to remix sound loops and mapped projections. One of Gotye's objectives when designing the sculpture was that even non-musicians could stand if front of it and feel like they were mixing the sounds, and get a clear sense of how the song breaks down.

It is the redesigned Fractured Heart that is now installed at the National Film and Sound Archive (NFSA) headquarters in Canberra. Visitors of the NFSA can ‘remix’ Gotye's songs Somebody That I Used to Know and State of The Art in real time using their bodies to trigger sounds and light animations.

== Launch at NFSA ==
The 'Fractured Heart' exhibit had a soft launch in December 2012, and was officially opened by Gotye and illuminart at the NFSA on 15 February 2013. The free event was open to the public; Gotye spoke about the creation of Fractured Heart, and interacted with the sculpture in front of a crowd of fans. The launch was followed by a presentation in Arc cinema in which Gotye talked about some of his favourite animators as well as some of his collaborations. The event then ended with ‘illuminart After Dark’ in which the courtyard of the NFSA Canberra headquarters were lit up with light and sound sculptures. These sculptures having been used by Nordoff-Robbins Music Therapy Australia.

== illuminart ==
illuminart who specialise in the design and creation of projection art, cross-disciplinary arts and audiovisual storytelling, worked closely with Gotye to create 'Fractured Heart'. Their avant-garde media art projects incorporate illumination with interactive projection art and performance, developed in creative collaborations and partnerships among a variety of disciplines. illuminart uses a combination of audiovisual media mapped to conform to the shape of three-dimensional structures, sculptures and architectural forms to create a projection sculpture. The technique of projection mapping to structures is also described as augmented sculpture, as the projected image may transform the sculpture with temporal and lighting illusions.
