= Drive Safe =

2026 single by Myles Smith and Niall Horan

Single by Myles Smith and Niall Horan

from the album My Mess, My Heart, My Life.
- Released: 6 February 2026
- Length: 3:21
- Label: It's OK to Feel, Sony
- Songwriters: Myles Smith; Niall Horan; Will Bloomfield; Peter Fenn; Steph Jones; Jesse Fink; Phil Plested
- Producers: Will Bloomfield; Peter Fenn

Myles Smith singles chronology
"Stay (If You Wanna Dance)" (2025)	"Drive Safe" (2026)	"My Mess" (2026)

Niall Horan singles chronology
"You Could Start a Cult" (2023)	"Drive Safe" (2026)	"Dinner Party" (2026)

"Drive Safe" is a song by British singer-songwriter Myles Smith and Irish singer-songwriter Niall Horan. The song was announced via the artists' Instagram and it was released on 6 February 2026.

Upon release, Smith said "Collaborations only really matter to me when they come from something real, and working with Niall genuinely did. He's got this effortless instinct for melody, but beyond that he's a good friend who very quickly became one of my closest. Our friendship shaped the song, and hopefully you can feel it in every line."

== Reception ==
Robin Murray from Clash said, "A touching piece of pop song-craft, 'Drive Safe' has a mature feel, the sound of two artists at ease in the studio and able to execute their ideas with real accuracy."

Athena Sobhan from Eurphoria said "Throughout the song, Horan and Smith sing about how important it is "to follow your heart wherever it takes you" and that it's okay if "tears fall" in the process. The enduring message throughout the track leans on the idea that "Life is a road, don't know what's along the way / so drive safe."

Joel Campbell from The Voice said "Pairing Myles' emotionally precise songwriting with Niall’'s globally celebrated melodic sensibility, the track feels intimate and effortless, shaped by a shared instinct for honest, heartfelt storytelling."

== Charts ==
=== Weekly charts ===
Weekly chart performance
Chart (2026)	Peak position
Belgium (Ultratop 50 Flanders)	16
Belgium (Ultratop 50 Wallonia)	20
Canada Hot 100 (Billboard)	94
Canada CHR/Top 40 (Billboard)	34
Croatia International Airplay (Top lista)	28
Czech Republic Airplay (ČNS IFPI)	11
Denmark Airplay (Tracklisten)	12
Estonia Airplay (TopHit)	8
France Airplay (SNEP)	23
Germany Airplay (BVMI)	11
Hungary (Editors' Choice Top 40)	35
Ireland (IRMA)	29
Italy Airplay (EarOne)	19
Kazakhstan Airplay (TopHit)	10
Latvia Airplay (LaIPA)	10
Lebanon (Lebanese Top 20)	12
Lithuania Airplay (TopHit)	6
Malta Airplay (Radiomonitor)	8
Netherlands (Dutch Top 40)	11
Netherlands (Single Top 100)	96
Netherlands Airplay (Dutch Charts)	2
New Zealand Hot Singles (RMNZ)	10
North Macedonia Airplay (Radiomonitor)	5
Paraguay Anglo Airplay (Monitor Latino)	9
Portugal Airplay (AFP)	41
Romania Airplay (TopHit)	58
San Marino Airplay (SMRTV Top 50)	23
Slovakia Airplay (ČNS IFPI)	27
Sweden Heatseeker (Sverigetopplistan)	11
Switzerland Airplay (IFPI)	3
UK Singles (Official Charts)	27
Venezuela Anglo Airplay (Monitor Latino)	9

=== Monthly charts ===
Monthly chart performance
Chart (2026)	Peak position
Estonia Airplay (TopHit)	9
Kazakhstan Airplay (TopHit)	13
Latvia Airplay (TopHit)	52
Lithuania Airplay (TopHit)	9
Romania Airplay (TopHit)	65

== Certifications ==
Region	Certification	Certified units/sales
United Kingdom (BPI)	Silver	200,000^{‡}
^{‡} Sales+streaming figures based on certification alone.
