= Gold (Myles Smith song) =

2025 single by Myles Smith

Single by Myles Smith

from the EP A Minute, a Moment... and the album My Mess, My Heart, My Life.
- Released: 23 May 2025
- Length: 2:44
- Label: It's OK to Feel, Sony
- Songwriters: Myles Smith-Thompson; Peter Fenn; Jesse Fink
- Producer: Peter Fenn

Myles Smith singles chronology
"My First Heartbreak" (2025)	"Gold" (2025)	"Stay (If You Wanna Dance)" (2025)

"Gold" is a song by British singer-songwriter Myles Smith. It was released on 23 May 2025 as the second single from his third EP, A Minute, a Moment.... The music video was released on the same day.

The single was teased in February 2025 The single was announced via TikTok on 10 May. It was later included on Smith's first album My Mess, My Heart, My Life.

== In popular cultures ==
The song is featured in EA Sports FC 26 as part of the game's main menu soundtrack.

== Charts ==
=== Weekly charts ===
Weekly chart performance for "Gold"
Chart (2025)	Peak position
Belgium (Ultratop 50 Flanders)	17
Croatia International Airplay (Top lista)	74
Denmark Airplay (Tracklisten)	15
Estonia Airplay (TopHit)	9
Italy Airplay (EarOne)	32
Latvia Airplay (LaIPA)	10
Lithuania Airplay (TopHit)	35
Malta Airplay (Radiomonitor)	18
New Zealand Hot Singles (RMNZ)	7
North Macedonia Airplay (Radiomonitor)	8
Poland (Polish Airplay Top 100)	72
Portugal Airplay (AFP)	23
Romania Airplay (TopHit)	116
San Marino Airplay (SMRTV Top 50)	34
Serbia Airplay (Radiomonitor)	11
UK Singles (OCC)	32
US Hot Rock & Alternative Songs (Billboard)	35

=== Monthly charts ===
Monthly chart performance for "Gold"
Chart (2025)	Peak position
Estonia Airplay (TopHit)	20
Lithuania Airplay (TopHit)	62

=== Year-end charts ===
Chart (2025)	Position
Belgium (Ultratop 50 Flanders)	142
Estonia Airplay (TopHit)	60

== Certifications ==
Region	Certification	Certified units/sales
United Kingdom (BPI)	Silver	200,000^{‡}
^{‡} Sales+streaming figures based on certification alone.
