= My Home (Myles Smith song) =

2023 single by Myles Smith

Single by Myles Smith

from the EP You Promised a Lifetime
- Released: 13 October 2023
- Length: 3:26
- Label: It's Okay to Feel; Sony UK
- Songwriters: Myles Smith-Thompson; Peter Fenn
- Producer: Fenn

Myles Smith singles chronology
"My Home" (2023)	"Solo" (2023)

"My Home" is a song by British singer-songwriter Myles Smith. It was released on 13 October 2023 as the lead single from his debut extended play You Promised a Lifetime (2024). The song was certified gold in UK and Canada.

== Reception ==
In the EP review, Justine Kostka from Melo Maniacs called "My Home" "a vibrant and uplifting anthem dedicated to the people who provide comfort and support in life's trials. With its infectious melody and heartfelt lyrics, 'My Home' sets a tone of gratitude and appreciation, celebrating the bonds that anchor us in turbulent times."

== Track listings ==
digital download / streaming
No.	Title	Length
1.	"My Home"	3:26

digital download / streaming
No.	Title	Length
1.	"My Home" (acoustic)	3:44

== Certifications ==
Certifications for "My Home"
Region	Certification	Certified units/sales
Canada (Music Canada)	Gold	40,000^{‡}
New Zealand (RMNZ)	Gold	15,000^{‡}
United Kingdom (BPI)	Silver	200,000^{‡}
^{‡} Sales+streaming figures based on certification alone.
