= Get Back (Basics album) =

Studio album by The Basics
- Released: 21 March 2003
- Genres: Rock; pop
- Length: 34:24
- Labels: Independent (2003 release); MGM Distribution (2008 reissue)
- Producer: The Basics

The Basics chronology
Get Back (2003)	Stand Out/Fit In (2007)

Alternative cover
- Original March 2003 cover

Get Back is the first studio album by Australian rock and roll band The Basics. Released on 21 March 2003, the album consists of material composed by members Wally de Backer and Kris Schroeder. The album features De Backer, Schroeder, and original lead guitarist Michael Hubbard.

== Background ==
Wally de Backer and Kris Schroeder met in March 2002, in Melbourne, at the going-away party of engineer/producer Chris O'Ryan. The pair jammed instrumentally alongside several others at that party, and took notice of one another. Subsequently, they became acquainted, and learned of their shared love for the rock and roll music of the 1950s and 60s, particularly that of the Beatles. Schroeder invited De Backer to join him in a musical group - "At the time, I was playing a gig down in Frankston, and I needed someone to come and join me on another instrument", Schroeder said in 2003. Schroeder and De Backer first rehearsed together at Schroeder's house, and had not heard one another sing prior to this. Upon being asked if he could sing, De Backer said that he could try - he sang Creedence Clearwater Revival's "Long as I Can See the Light", greatly impressing Schroeder.

Since the dissolution of his first band Downstares, De Backer had scarcely played drums for a period of three years; his attention had been focused on sampling and creating music for his Gotye project. De Backer took up the drums once again in order to play in his new band alongside Schroeder, who played acoustic guitar. At this stage, the band's live set consisted of cover songs. In this early period, they played gigs in Melbourne venues, including Frankston club The Opposition. The duo played their first show here on 29 March 2002, and were paid $50 each for four 40 minute sets in one night. Another of the band's first ongoing gigs was at the House of Fools in Footscray infamous for its rough inhabitants; the duo played there for four hours each Wednesday night for $25 each. During these early gigs, the enthusiastic audience response for immediate, energetic rock and roll songs such as their cover of the Spencer Davis Group's "Gimme Some Lovin'" made a distinct impression on the pair.

Schroeder and De Backer's musical group initially went under the name The Big Nothing, which was then changed to The Big Something. The name 'The Basics' was the invention of Schroeder, who recalls it "coming to [him] while in the shower", vaguely inspired by the musical simplicity of their act, with only two instruments and two voices.

Soon after the duo's initial formation, Schroeder wrote "What Have You Done?", a midtempo rock and roll song. The lyrics detail the protagonist learning of his partner's deceit and reckless drunken behaviour, and presenting her with an ultimatum - "I won't play your games if you won't change your ways". De Backer remarked in 2003 that based on Schroeder's writing of this song, the pair made the decision that they would continue in this musical style. Early in the band's existence, De Backer wrote "You're Already Gone" - the song, in the time signature of 6/8, describes a relationship in which the woman constantly leaves the protagonist returning again when in need. Another composition, "Karolina", was a collaboration between Schroeder and De Backer. According to Schroeder, it began as his own composition, but was finished and organised into its final form with the help of his bandmate. During this early period of March–November 2002, The Basics also recorded tape demos including covers of "Gimme Some Lovin'", Prince's "Kiss", Schroeder composition "A Night Inside Your Mind", and Schroeder and De Backer's first ever joint composition, "I'll Never Love Again".

In November 2002, Schroeder and De Backer met fellow musician Michael Hubbard - The Basics and Hubbard were both performing at a venue on the same night. Their meeting would result in Hubbard's being invited to join the group as lead guitarist. According to Schroeder, Hubbard's involvement in the group was "essentially a temporary arrangement from the start ... Michael always had plans to do more solo stuff". After Hubbard joined the band, Schroeder permanently became the band's bass guitarist. According to De Backer, the first songs which the three learned together and arranged for the three-piece band were "What Have You Done?", "It's Over", and "Can You Trust Me?", all written by Schroeder. While "It's Over" deals with a relationship which the singer feels must end, "Can You Trust Me?" describes the joy of a new romance; the protagonist professes, however, that he has been known to "play around", and hopes, with some apparent uncertainty, that he is capable of faithfulness.

The Basics, now with three members, were highly productive in late 2002 and early 2003, playing further gigs, and recording more material for potential release, much of which was newly written by Schroeder and De Backer. In late 2002, the Basics had two recording sessions with engineer Michael McClintock - the result of these sessions was a four-track EP consisting of "What Have You Done?", "It's Over", "Can You Trust Me?", and "Better". The former three of these four songs would eventually appear in re-recorded form on "Get Back" in March 2003, whereas "Better" was shelved for unknown reasons, and would not be utilised by the band until 2007, on their second album, "Stand Out/Fit In". By this point, the song's arrangement had been altered somewhat, with the key lowered by three semitones, and the three-part vocal harmonies reduced to two parts. The early recording was eventually released on the 2013 rarities compilation, "Leftovers".

"Did I Ever Stand a Chance", another Schroeder composition, served as an opportunity for Hubbard to take on lead vocal duties. In 2003, Hubbard commented with amusement on the fact that he almost always failed to remember the lyrics correctly, despite the song being in the band's live repertoire for several months. Throughout the song, De Backer and Schroeder sing backing vocals, serving as something of a Greek chorus, commenting on the lead singer's predicament - "He needs an answer".

During the months prior to the release of the band's debut album, Hubbard at one point embarked on a brief solo tour, while Schroeder and De Backer continued writing material. Schroeder wrote "Gone... Gone... Gone...", a song which he describes as a "50's dance-hall ballad", in which the singer tells of remorse over infidelity, and laments his broken relationship. "Lovin' Man" was also composed at this time - written by Schroeder, the song is lyrically simplistic, and musically embedded in country and rockabilly stylings. Schroeder intended for Hubbard to sing "Lovin' Man"'s lead vocal, though Schroeder would ultimately do so himself. Schroeder also composed "Hey C'mon", which would ultimately become the closing track for "Get Back" - the song, in which Schroeder sings of a rewarding and happy relationship, was written "in about five minutes in the car".

Further new material included De Backer's "I Don't Need Another", in which the singer pleads a love interest, whom he has wronged in the past, for another chance at a relationship. At one stage, Schroeder had "not written anything for ages", while De Backer was continuing to create songs. Anxious to generate more of his own material, Schroeder borrowed the general structure and lyrical framing from the Beatles' "She Loves You", and wrote "She's Gonna B. Late". Like in "She Loves You", the singer is a third party to a relationship, relaying information from the woman to the man - "I got a call from your girlfriend - she told me to tell you she's coming to the party tonight". Another song contributed by De Backer was "I Could Go On". The song's subject matter is not unlike that of "You're Already Gone" - in each song, the singer describes his frustration at a lover's indecisive ways. "I Could Go On" also provides strong juxtaposition against "Gone... Gone... Gone..." - in "I Could Go On", De Backer resolves, "I will survive even after you're gone", while in "Gone... Gone... Gone...", Schroeder declares that he cannot go on without his lover.

The earliest known video footage of the band performing together originates from this period, shortly before the release of Get Back. The footage was recorded to accompany a video 'interview', in which the band answer questions prepared by themselves. The resulting seven minute mini-documentary was later released as a bonus component alongside the original 2003 release of Get Back - it includes snippets of the band performing renditions of each song from the album, with exception of "I Could Go On". For this performance, De Backer plays a simplified drum kit using brush sticks, and Schroeder and Hubbard each play acoustic guitars. The video ends with a brief a cappella rendition of Creedence Clearwater Revival's "Proud Mary", sung in three-part harmony.

== Recording and Release ==
The recording of Get Back took place over four days. The band acted as their own producers for the recording sessions, while Michael McClintock and William Bowden served as Balance Engineer and Mastering Engineer respectively. The album was mostly recorded live, with occasional overdubs including additional percussion and handclaps. De Backer, Hubbard, and Schroeder were also joined by John Zutic, who contributed piano parts for "I Could Go On", "Gone... Gone... Gone...", and "You're Already Gone". After recording was completed, two days were spent mixing, and then mastering was completed in just three hours. The photograph used for the album's original artwork was taken during one of the recording sessions - "a camera belonging to Hubbard was set to a 15-second timer while the boys quickly huddled together, smiling furiously at the lens".

By the time of Get Back's release, the group were highly experienced as live performers; De Backer and Schroeder had played over one hundred shows together since coming together almost a year prior.

The album's title is an oblique reference to the Beatles' aborted 1969 album of the same name, which ultimately became Let It Be. Much like in the case of that abandoned Beatles album, the meaning behind the title Get Back is one of return to straightforward, energetic rock and roll. In terms of typeface and layout, the album artwork for the original 2003 release of Get Back closely emulated that of the Beatles' debut Please Please Me, and by extension, the proposed artwork for the Beatles' Get Back, which was itself to be an imitation of Please Please Me's cover art. The artwork reads, "The Basics - Get Back - with I Could Go On and 11 other songs", much like the artwork for Please Please Me advertises "Love Me Do and 12 other songs".

Without management or a record label, The Basics were only capable of a limited release, manufacturing and selling 1000 CDs.

In 2013, the Basics recorded an acoustic version of "I Don't Need Another" at the National Film and Sound Archive in Canberra, using a 1903 Edison Standard D model wax cylinder.

== 2008 Reissue ==
Get Back saw a much more widespread re-release via MGM Distribution on 2 August 2008, being mass-produced for physical sale, as well as being made available on online platforms iTunes and Bandcamp. The audio was remastered, and the artwork was replaced by a more professionally shot photograph which had been taken two months after the original 2003 release, in anticipation of a potential reissue.

In July and August 2008, the Basics undertook a tri-state tour in support of the album's relaunch. Hubbard was not present for these shows, having departed the band four years prior; Tim Heath had permanently filled the role of lead guitarist since then. The tour's setlists drew heavily on the album's material, as well as covers from the band's early repertoire such as "Gimme Some Lovin'".

== Track listing ==
All songs credited to Schroeder-De Backer.

No.	Title	Lead vocals	Length
1.	"I Could Go On"	De Backer	3:22
2.	"She's Gonna B. Late"	Schroeder	2:13
3.	"Karolina"	De Backer	2:45
4.	"I Don't Need Another"	De Backer	3:29
5.	"Lovin' Man"	Schroeder	2:21
6.	"Can You Trust Me?"	De Backer	2:07
7.	"It's Over"	Schroeder	2:27
8.	"What Have You Done?"	Schroeder	3:22
9.	"Did I Ever Stand a Chance?"	Hubbard	3:08
10.	"Gone... Gone... Gone..."	Schroeder	3:13
11.	"You're Already Gone"	De Backer	3:18
12.	"Hey C'mon!"	Schroeder	2:39

== Personnel ==
The Basics

- Kris Schroeder – lead and backing vocals, bass guitar, acoustic guitar on track four, handclaps.
- Wally de Backer – lead and backing vocals, drums, tambourine, maracas, handclaps.
- Michael Hubbard – lead and backing vocals, electric guitar, lap steel guitar on tracks four and five, handclaps.

Additional musicians and production staff

- John Zutic – piano on tracks one, ten, and eleven.
- Michael McClintock – balance engineer
- William Bowden – mastering engineer
- James Bryans – photography for album
- Deborah Schroeder – photography for album
