= Solo (Myles Smith song) =

2023 single by Myles Smith

Single by Myles Smith

from the EP You Promised a Lifetime
- Released: 15 November 2023
- Length: 3:19
- Label: It's Okay to Feel; Sony UK
- Songwriters: Myles Smith-Thompson; Peter Fenn
- Producer: Fenn

Myles Smith singles chronology
"My Home" (2023)	"Solo" (2023)	"Behind" (2023)

"Solo" is a song by British singer-songwriter Myles Smith. It was released in November 2023 as the second single from his debut extended play You Promised a Lifetime (2024). The song debuted on the UK Singles Chart in March 2024, becoming his first top 100 single. It peaked at number 69 in May 2024.

== Reception ==
Nate Fenningdorf from Play Date Media said "[Solo] which features, stomp-and-holler drums, complimentary keys and guitar and silky vocals, has everything you could ask for in an indie-folk song."

In the EP review, Justine Kostka from Melo Maniacs said "Smith's emotive delivery and evocative lyrics paint a vivid portrait of heartbreak and resilience, inviting listeners to reflect on their own experiences of longing and acceptance."

== Track listings ==
"Solo"
No.	Title	Length
1.	"Solo"	3:19

"Solo"
No.	Title	Length
1.	"Solo" (acoustic)	2:53

"Solo"
No.	Title	Length
1.	"Solo" (piano version)	3:13

== Charts ==
=== Weekly charts ===
Weekly chart performance for "Solo"
Chart (2024)	Peak position
Poland (Polish Airplay Top 100)	7
Sweden (Sverigetopplistan)	66
Switzerland (Schweizer Hitparade)	100
UK Singles (Official Charts)	69

=== Year-end charts ===
Year-end chart performance for "Solo"
Chart (2024)	Position
Poland (Polish Airplay Top 100)	65

== Certifications ==
Certifications for "Solo"
Region	Certification	Certified units/sales
Canada (Music Canada)	Platinum	80,000^{‡}
New Zealand (RMNZ)	Gold	15,000^{‡}
South Africa (RISA)	Gold	20,000^{‡}
United Kingdom (BPI)	Gold	400,000^{‡}
United States (RIAA)	Gold	500,000^{‡}
^{‡} Sales+streaming figures based on certification alone.
