= B.A.S.I.C. (The Basics album) =

Studio album by The Basics
- Released: 22 November 2019
- Genre: Rock, alternative
- Length: 43:04
- Label: The Three Basics

The Basics chronology
In the Rude! (2017)	B.A.S.I.C. (2019)	This Machine Makes Coffee (2020)

Singles from B.A.S.I.C.
- 1. "Land of 1000 Dances" Released: 6 December 2019

B.A.S.I.C. is the fifth studio album by Australian band The Basics. It was released on 22 November 2019, and contains a variety of original songs written by the band, and cover versions from artists such as The Beatles and Chuck Berry.

The album was recorded at The Barn, a converted studio at Wally De Backer's parents' farm in the Mornington Peninsula in Victoria. The release was put together entirely by the band, including recording, production, mixing and presentation.

The record was made available for purchase as a digital download (via the band's Bandcamp online storefront) and limited edition CD, a vinyl record, and cassette tape formats.

The album was launched with a one-off gig on 21 November 2019 at the Gershwin Room at Melbourne's Esplanade Hotel.

The album had working titles of Faxing Zimbabwe and Game Over.

== Track listing ==
No.	Title	Length
1.	"Shot Down"	2:23
2.	"Shakedown on 9th Street"	2:21
3.	"My Old Mate"	2:47
4.	"Love Hurts"	2:54
5.	"My Baby"	3:53
6.	"Bésame Mucho"	2:40
7.	"All Day and All of the Night"	2:16
8.	"Wipe Out"	2:16
9.	"Land of 1000 Dances"	2:31
10.	"Some Other Guy"	2:08
11.	"You Never Can Tell"	3:04
12.	"Clarabella"	3:10
13.	"Baby It's You"	2:41
14.	"Money (That's What I Want)"	2:41
15.	"Lovin' Man"	2:16
16.	"Call It Rhythm and Blues"	2:56

== Charts ==
Chart (2019)	Peak position
Australian Albums (ARIA)	66
100% Independent Albums Chart (AIR)	1
