= Spirit Level (record label) =

Australian music label

Spirit Level is a music label established by Wally de Backer (solo project Gotye, and drummer in The Basics) and Tim Shiel (musician and Double J radio broadcaster) in 2014, based in Melbourne, Australia.

Spirit Level operates out of the converted Metropolitan Meat Market in North Melbourne.

The impetus for starting Spirit Level was the realisation that one of their favourite American artists, Zammuto, was not able to get an Australian release for their new album "Anchor". They discovered Zammuto when they opened for some of Gotye's international shows. Spirit Level supported the launch of the album in Australia, signing a distribution deal with Inertia and presenting an Australian tour for the artist.

Although the label includes artists from outside Australia, the majority are Australian artists. Spirit Level artists include Braille Face, Happy Axe, Kcin, and Hemm.

In 2019, Spirit Level was nominated by the Australian Independent Record Labels Association (AIR) as one of the top 5 independent record labels in Australia.
