= You Promised a Lifetime =

EP by Myles Smith
- Released: 29 March 2024
- Length: 17:46
- Labels: It's Okay to Feel; Sony UK
- Producer: Peter Fenn

Myles Smith chronology
You Promised a Lifetime (2024)	A Minute... (2024)

Singles from You Promised a Lifetime
- 1. "My Home" Released: 13 October 2023; 2. "Solo" Released: 15 November 2023; 3. "Behind" Released: 27 December 2023; 4. "River" Released: 16 February 2024; 5. "Betting on Us" Released: 15 March 2024

You Promised a Lifetime is the debut extended play (EP) by British singer and songwriter Myles Smith. It was announced on 23 February 2024 released on 29 March 2024 by It's Okay to Feel and Sony Music UK.

Upon release, Smith said "This title represents a profound, yet neutral statement, which gains meaning through the perspective of the person reading it. With the project, my own stories, and the stories of those around me were used to create it, but it's the stories and journeys of those listening who truly give it life, depending on where you are in life and what you are feeling. I hope it gives space to people to unlock their own meanings."

The album debuted at number 30 on the UK Album Downloads Chart, but peaked at number 18 in January 2025 following his BBC Introducing Artist of the Year award win.

The EP was supported with his second headline tour, The Not So Slightly Less Lonely Tour through May and June 2024.

An acoustic version of the EP was released digitally on 3 May 2024.

== Reception ==
Justine Kostka from Melo Maniacs said "Myles Smith's debut EP, You Promised a Lifetime, is a rich composition of emotions and experiences woven into six captivating songs." Kostka continued saying "Each song offers a unique perspective, delving into themes of love, loss, resilience and hope".

Damien Morris from The Guardian said "A passionate purveyor of anthemic folk-pop with an alt-country vibe, everything this Luton singer-songwriter has released so far sounds like a hit" calling the EP a "superb debut".

== Track listing ==
You Promised a Lifetime track listing
No.	Title	Writer(s)	Producer(s)	Length
1.	"My Home"	Myles Smith; Peter Fenn	Peter Fenn	3:26
2.	"River"	Smith; Fenn; Jesse Fink	Fenn	2:36
3.	"Solo"	Smith; Fenn	Fenn	3:19
4.	"Behind"	Smith; Fenn; Fink	Fenn	3:18
5.	"Sweet Love"	Smith; Fenn; Stephen Day; Dominic Martinez	Fenn; Dominic Martinez	2:29
6.	"Betting On Us"	Smith; Fenn; Steph Jones; Suriel Hess	Fenn	2:35
Total length:				17:46

You Promised a Lifetime (Acoustic) track listing
No.	Title	Length
1.	"Solo" (piano version)	3:13
2.	"My Home" (acoustic)	3:44
3.	"River" (acoustic)	2:48
4.	"Sweet Love" (acoustic)	2:38
5.	"Betting On Us" (acoustic)	2:54
6.	"Behind" (acoustic)	3:41
7.	"Solo" (acoustic)	2:53
Total length:		21:54

== Charts ==
Chart performance for You Promised a Lifetime
Chart (2024–2025)	Peak position
UK Album Downloads (Official Charts)	18
UK Americana Albums (Official Charts)	6
UK Folk Albums (Official Charts)	1
