= Myles Smith =

British singer (born 1998)

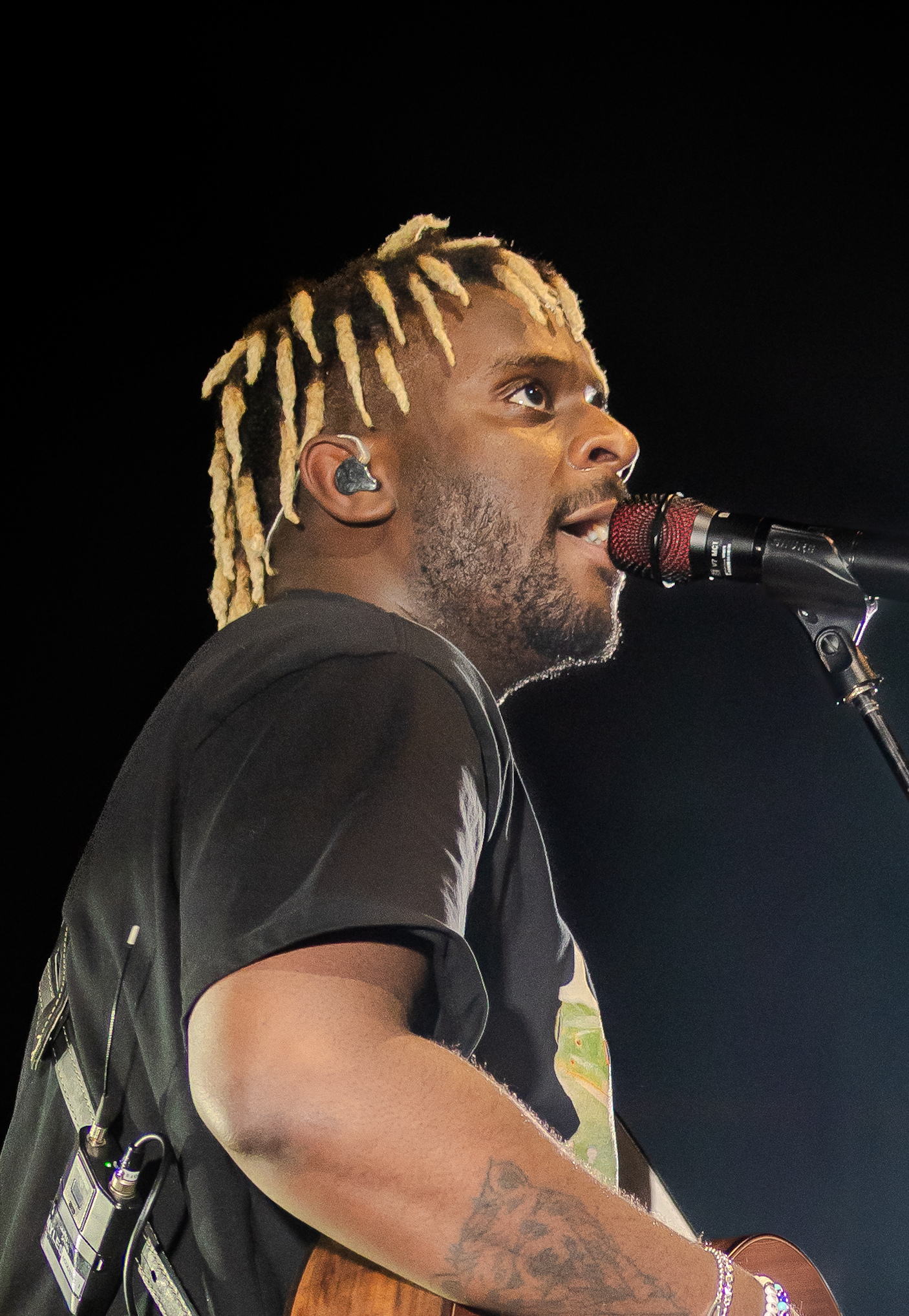
- Smith performing at Shepherd's Bush Empire in 2025

Background information
- Born: Myles Michael Smith-Thompson; 3 June 1998 (age 28); Luton, Bedfordshire, England
- Education: University of Nottingham
- Genre: Folk-pop
- Occupations: Musician; singer; songwriter
- Instruments: Vocals; guitar
- Years active: 2010–present
- Label: Sony UK
- Website: mylessmith.co.uk

Myles Michael Smith-Thompson (born 3 June 1998) is a British singer. He is best known for his 2024 singles "Stargazing" and "Nice to Meet You". His debut studio album, My Mess, My Heart, My Life. was released on 19 June 2026.

== Early life ==
Smith was born to a British Jamaican family in Luton on 3 June 1998 and raised in an ethnically diverse community. He grew up listening to a broad range of music, including pop-punk, singer/songwriters, and hip-hop. As his interest in music grew, he bought a guitar and learned to play. He began performing covers at parties and open-mic nights, focusing on songwriters such as Ed Sheeran, Marcus Mumford, and Chris Martin.

From a young age, Smith taught himself to play guitar and piano, and by the age of 12, he was performing at local open-mic nights. Growing up in Luton, he was influenced by the town's cultural diversity and local music scene, which included family pubs and Irish music. This environment encouraged him to break boundaries and develop his individual musical style.

Smith studied sociology at the University of Nottingham and graduated in 2019.

== Career ==
Smith began posting on TikTok and in the autumn of 2022, a clip posted caught the attention of Eric Parker. An attorney and CEO of Extended Play Music Group, Parker offered to be Smith’s manager.

Smith gained significant attention from his covers of popular songs, including Amber Run's "I Found". In late 2023, Smith released several singles, including "My Home" and "Solo". This online success led to a record deal with Sony Music.

In March 2024, Smith released his debut EP, You Promised a Lifetime.

Smith released "Stargazing" released on 10 May 2024. It was written by Smith, Jesse Fink, and Peter Fenn, the latter of whom produced it. The song contains themes of "self-discovery and introspection", with Smith describing the inspiration as being rooted in the idea of lifelong love, conceived during his time in Los Angeles. The single exploded in popularity, charting the No. 1 spot on the Billboard Alternative Airplay chart for a week in September 2024, and as of September 2026 surpassed a billion streams on Spotify.

Smith performed on the BBC Music Introducing Stage at the Radio 1 Big Weekend on 25 May 2024. The event, held at Stockwood Park in his hometown, was his first festival performance. His performance was supported by BBC Music Introducing, a platform by BBC Radio for unsigned, undiscovered, and under-the-radar UK music talent. His performance was specifically supported by BBC Three Counties Radio. He won the BBC Introducing Artist of the Year award for 2024. A year later, he performed on the main stage of BBC Radio 1 Big Weekend.

He received three nominations at the 2025 BRIT Awards, including receiving the BRIT Rising Star Award, at the broadcast ceremony on 1 March 2025.

His single "Nice to Meet You" hit No. 1 on the Billboard Alternative Airplay chart in July 2025.

Smith supported Ed Sheeran on the European leg of Sheeran's 2025 tour. Later that year, on 28 September, Smith performed the halftime show for the NFL International Series game at Croke Park in Dublin, Ireland.

On 6 February 2026, Smith released the single "Drive Safe", in collaboration with Irish singer Niall Horan. On 19 June 2026, he released his debut studio album, My Mess, My Heart, My Life. The album includes "Stargazing" and "Nice to Meet You" from his second EP A Minute... and "Gold" from his third EP A Minute, a Moment....

Critical reception to the album was largely mixed. Alexis Petridis from The Guardian gave the album 2 out of 5 stars, saying "how indebted Smith still is to the artists he started out covering", referencing Mumford & Sons, Coldplay and Ed Sheeran. Petridis also called the album "faceless and formulaic", adding, "As it is, it's hard to see what Smith is actually bringing to the party, beyond an amalgamation of his favourite artists".

In March 2026, Smith announced that the My Mess, My Heart, My Life. arena tour would kick off in November. In September 2026, he announced that Josie Edwards and Chance Peña would perform as a supporting acts for the tour.

== Discography ==
=== Studio albums ===
List of studio albums, with selected details
Title	Details	Peak chart positions										Certifications
Title	Details	UK	AUS	BEL (FL)	CAN	FRA	GER	IRE	NLD	SWI	US	Certifications
My Mess, My Heart, My Life.	Released: 19 June 2026; Label: It's Okay to Feel, Sony UK; Format: LP, digital download, streaming	2	41	27	61	53	33	48	28	22	135	BPI: Silver

=== Extended plays ===
List of EPs, with selected details, chart positions and certifications
Title	Details	Peak chart positions								Certifications
Title	Details	UK	AUS	CAN	IRE	LTU	NOR	NZ	US	Certifications
You Promised a Lifetime	Released: 29 March 2024; Label: It's Okay to Feel, Sony UK; Format: LP, digital download, streaming	— (Note: You Promised a Lifetime did not enter the UK Albums Chart, but peaked at number 18 on the UK Album Downloads Chart.)	—	—	—	—	—	—	—	
A Minute...	Released: 8 November 2024; Label: It's Okay to Feel, Sony UK; Format: LP, CD, digital download, streaming	32	—	30	88	88	14	40	99	BPI: Gold; MC: Gold
A Minute, a Moment...	Released: 23 May 2025; Label: It's Okay to Feel, Sony UK; Format: LP, CD, digital download, streaming	—	91	—	—	—	80	39	—	IFPI NOR: Gold; RIAA: Gold; RMNZ: Platinum
"—" denotes a recording that did not chart in that territory.

=== Singles ===
List of singles, with selected chart positions and certifications
Title	Year	Peak chart positions										Certifications	Album
Title	Year	UK	AUS	BEL (FL)	CAN	CZE Air.	NLD	NZ	SWE	SWI	US	Certifications	Album
"Sweater Weather"	2023	—	—	—	—	—	—	—	—	—	—		Non-album singles
"Memories (I Don't Have)"	2023	—	—	—	—	—	—	—	—	—	—		Non-album singles
"My Home"	2023	—	—	—	—	—	—	—	—	—	—	BPI: Silver; MC: Gold; RMNZ: Gold	You Promised a Lifetime
"Solo"	2023	69	—	—	—	—	— (Note: "Solo" did not enter the Dutch Single Top 100, but peaked at number 24 on the Single Tip chart.)	—	66	100	—	BPI: Gold; MC: Platinum; RIAA: Gold; RMNZ: Gold	You Promised a Lifetime
"Behind"	2023	—	—	—	—	—	—	—	—	—	—		You Promised a Lifetime
"River"	2024	—	—	—	—	—	—	—	—	—	—		You Promised a Lifetime
"Betting on Us"	2024	—	—	—	—	—	—	—	—	—	—		You Promised a Lifetime
"Stargazing"	2024	4	11	1	6	1	5	13	7	5	19	BPI: 3× Platinum; ARIA: 6× Platinum; BRMA: 2× Platinum; GLF: Platinum; IFPI SWI: Platinum; MC: 6× Platinum; NVPI: Platinum; RIAA: 4× Platinum; RMNZ: 4× Platinum	A Minute...
"Wait for You"	2024	53	—	31	—	—	56	— (Note: "Wait for You" did not enter the NZ Top 40 Singles Chart, but peaked at number 17 on the NZ Hot Singles Chart.)	— (Note: "Wait for You" did not enter the Swedish Singellista Chart, but peaked at number five on the Swedish Heatseeker Chart.)	—	—	BPI: Silver; MC: Gold; RIAA: Gold	A Minute...
"Whisper"	2024	—	—	—	—	13	—	— (Note: "Whisper" did not enter the NZ Top 40 Singles Chart, but peaked at number 19 on the NZ Hot Singles Chart.)	—	—	—		A Minute...
"Nice to Meet You"	2024	6	54	6	21	1	28	— (Note: "Nice to Meet You" did not enter the NZ Top 40 Singles Chart, but peaked at number four on the NZ Hot Singles Chart.)	78	38	25	BPI: 2× Platinum; BRMA: Platinum; IFPI SWI: Gold; MC: 2× Platinum; RIAA: Platinum; RMNZ: Platinum	A Minute...
"Blink Twice" (with Shaboozey)	2025	44	—	12	57	—	— (Note: "Blink Twice" did not enter the Dutch Single Top 100, but peaked at number three on the Single Tip chart.)	—	85	—	— (Note: "Blink Twice" did not enter the Billboard Hot 100, but peaked at number 1 on the Bubbling Under Hot 100 chart.)		Where I've Been, Isn't Where I'm Going Deluxe
"My First Heartbreak"	2025	—	—	—	—	—	—	— (Note: "My First Heartbreak" did not enter the Official New Zealand Music Chart, but peaked at number 18 on the New Zealand Hot Singles chart.)	—	—	—		A Minute, a Moment...
"Gold"	2025	32	—	17	—	—	—	— (Note: "Gold" did not enter the NZ Top 40 Singles Chart, but peaked at number 7 on the NZ Hot Singles Chart.)	—	—	—	BPI: Silver	A Minute, a Moment...
"Stay (If You Wanna Dance)"	2025	32	—	9	—	82	68	— (Note: "Stay (If You Wanna Dance)" did not enter the NZ Top 40 Singles Chart, but peaked at number 8 on the NZ Hot Singles Chart.)	—	—	—	BPI: Silver	My Mess, My Heart, My Life.
"Drive Safe" (with Niall Horan)	2026	27	94	16	94	11	96	— (Note: "Drive Safe" did not enter the NZ Top 40 Singles Chart, but peaked at number 10 on the NZ Hot Singles Chart.)	— (Note: "Drive Safe" did not enter the Swedish Singellista Chart, but peaked at number 11 on the Swedish Heatseeker Chart.)	—	—	BPI: Silver	My Mess, My Heart, My Life.
"My Mess"	2026	58	—	—	—	—	— (Note: "My Mess" did not enter the Dutch Single Top 100, but peaked at number 30 on the Single Tip chart.)	— (Note: "My Mess" did not enter the NZ Top 40 Singles Chart, but peaked at number 19 on the NZ Hot Singles Chart.)	—	—	—		My Mess, My Heart, My Life.
"Hold Me in the Dark"	2026	—	—	—	—	—	—	—	—	—	—		My Mess, My Heart, My Life.
"Heaven"	2026	—	—	—	—	52	—	— (Note: "Heaven" did not enter the NZ Top 40 Singles Chart, but peaked at number 10 on the NZ Hot Singles Chart.)	—	—	—		My Mess, My Heart, My Life.
"—" denotes a recording that did not chart in that territory.

=== Other releases ===
List of other releases
Title	Year	Album
"Birds of a Feather"	2024	Apple Music Sessions: Myles Smith

== Tours ==
- The Slightly Less Lonely Tour (2024)
- We Were Never Strangers Tour (2024–25)
- My Mess, My Heart, My Life. Tour (2026)

== Filmography ==
Year	Title	Role	Notes	Ref.
2026	Saturday Night Live UK	Himself (musical guest)	Series 1, Episode 7 (Hannah Waddingham/Myles Smith)	
