= Stargazing (Myles Smith song) =

2024 single by Myles Smith

Single by Myles Smith

from the EP A Minute... and the album My Mess, My Heart, My Life.
- Released: 10 May 2024
- Recorded: January 2024
- Genre: Folk-pop
- Length: 2:52
- Label: It's OK to Feel, Sony UK
- Songwriters: Myles Smith; Peter Fenn; Jesse Fink
- Producer: Peter Fenn

Myles Smith singles chronology
"Betting on Us" (2024)	"Stargazing" (2024)	"Wait for You" (2024)

"Stargazing" is a song by British singer-songwriter Myles Smith. It was released as the lead single from his second extended play A Minute... on 10 May 2024 through Sony Music. Smith wrote it with songwriter Jesse Fink and its producer, Peter Fenn. It was later included on Smith's first album My Mess, My Heart, My Life.

Critics praised the song for its soulful melody and catchy rhythm. In the United States, the song peaked at number 19 on the Billboard Hot 100 and became Smith's first song to reach the top 40; it was also his first number one on the Pop Airplay chart. The song also reached the top 10 in various countries including the United Kingdom, Canada, Belgium, Germany, and Austria.

"Stargazing" was born from a collaborative songwriting session in Malibu, California, shortly after he signed with RCA Records, with the aim to create "something that's really warm, fun, and happy". The song's hook came to him almost instantly, inspired by the idea of loved ones being present in one's life, even in ways they do not always realise.

== Background ==
In an interview with Billboard, Myles Smith stated he created the song during his visit to San Francisco, California in January 2024, when he wanted to write "something that's really warm, fun and happy". The title was inspired by a moment of him watching a sunset in Malibu with his friends. According to Smith, he instantly came up with the chorus. Regarding the process of composing the song with co-songwriters Jesse Fink and Peter Fenn, Smith said:

It was just us jumping around, about day five into writing—looking at each other with guitars and having the time of our lives. It came from the idea of the people that you love, the things that you love, always being present in your life, maybe in a way you don't recognize or see. And then that coming into light later in the day, and that euphoric moment of realizing that. The whole song wasn't finished on that day, but the embers of it definitely were. From the very moment that that melody was found, the warmth in the room was infectious.

He revealed additional details behind the changes they made to the song as they were composing and recording:

At the time, it was just really the hook and the bare bones of the verse and melody. I think that's the exciting part of where we are now in music. Not everything has to be done, and not everything has to be perfect. In fact, the process of getting there was very much a reciprocal relationship between me and my fans. Watching them react to it, I was even more inspired to finish the song. We kept the bones of the demo in there, and we embellished it to bring it to studio standard. We wanted to not step too far away from the magic that had been created.

On 8 April 2024, prior to finishing the song, Smith posted a snippet of him performing the hook of the song over acoustic guitar on the video-sharing app TikTok. On 16 April, he previewed a demo version of the song. On 21 April, Smith released the official audio of the song on TikTok, which has since soundtracked over 259K clips.

== Track listing ==
Digital download and streaming
No.	Title	Length
1.	"Stargazing"	2:52

Digital download and streaming
No.	Title	Length
1.	"Stargazing" (live from Manchester)	3:28

Digital download and streaming
No.	Title	Length
1.	"Stargazing" (Moonlight version)	3:22

== Charts ==
=== Weekly charts ===
Weekly chart performance for "Stargazing"
Chart (2024–2026)	Peak position
Australia (ARIA)	11
Austria (Ö3 Austria Top 40)	5
Belarus Airplay (TopHit)	177
Belgium (Ultratop 50 Flanders)	1
Belgium (Ultratop 50 Wallonia)	3
Canada Hot 100 (Billboard)	6
Canada All-Format Airplay (Billboard)	1
Canada AC (Billboard)	1
Canada CHR/Top 40 (Billboard)	1
Canada Hot AC (Billboard)	1
Canada Modern Rock (Billboard Canada)	17
Canada Rock (Billboard)	30
Colombia Anglo Airplay (National-Report)	3
CIS Airplay (TopHit)	34
Czech Republic Airplay (ČNS IFPI)	1
Czech Republic Singles Digital (ČNS IFPI)	18
Denmark (Tracklisten)	15
Estonia Airplay (TopHit)	4
France (SNEP)	39
Germany (GfK)	7
Global 200 (Billboard)	16
Hungary (Rádiós Top 40)	31
Ireland (IRMA)	5
Israel International Airplay (Media Forest)	18
Italy (FIMI)	54
Kazakhstan Airplay (TopHit)	78
Latvia Airplay (LaIPA)	4
Lebanon (Lebanese Top 20)	6
Lithuania (AGATA)	71
Lithuania Airplay (TopHit)	16
Luxembourg (Billboard)	9
Malta Airplay (Radiomonitor)	9
Netherlands (Dutch Top 40)	3
Netherlands (Single Top 100)	5
New Zealand (Recorded Music NZ)	13
Nigeria (TurnTable Top 100)	84
Norway (VG-lista)	17
Paraguay Anglo Airplay (Monitor Latino)	17
Poland (Polish Airplay Top 100)	16
Poland (Polish Streaming Top 100)	81
Portugal (AFP)	44
Romania Airplay (TopHit)	49
San Marino Airplay (SMRTV Top 50)	6
Singapore (RIAS)	28
Slovakia Airplay (ČNS IFPI)	3
Slovakia Singles Digital (ČNS IFPI)	29
South Africa Streaming (TOSAC)	6
Sweden (Sverigetopplistan)	7
Switzerland (Schweizer Hitparade)	5
Ukraine Airplay (TopHit)	178
UK Singles (Official Charts)	4
US Billboard Hot 100	19
US Adult Contemporary (Billboard)	3
US Adult Pop Airplay (Billboard)	1
US Hot Rock & Alternative Songs (Billboard)	3
US Pop Airplay (Billboard)	1
US Radio Songs (Billboard)	2
US Rock & Alternative Airplay (Billboard)	1

=== Monthly charts ===
Monthly chart performance for "Stargazing"
Chart (2024)	Position
CIS Airplay (TopHit)	40
Czech Republic (Rádio Top 100)	1
Czech Republic (Singles Digitál Top 100)	23
Estonia Airplay (TopHit)	6
Kazakhstan Airplay (TopHit)	99
Lithuania Airplay (TopHit)	15
Romania Airplay (TopHit)	88
Slovakia (Rádio Top 100)	4
Slovakia (Singles Digitál Top 100)	28

=== Year-end charts ===
2024 year-end chart performance for "Stargazing"
Chart (2024)	Position
Australia (ARIA)	27
Austria (Ö3 Austria Top 40)	22
Belgium (Ultratop Flanders)	8
Belgium (Ultratop 50 Wallonia)	21
Canada (Canadian Hot 100)	29
CIS Airplay (TopHit)	103
Denmark (Tracklisten)	37
Estonia Airplay (TopHit)	15
France (SNEP)	100
Germany (GfK)	32
Global 200 (Billboard)	91
Lithuania Airplay (TopHit)	29
Netherlands (Dutch Top 40)	7
Netherlands (Single Top 100)	18
New Zealand (Recorded Music NZ)	36
Portugal (AFP)	162
Sweden (Sverigetopplistan)	27
Switzerland (Schweizer Hitparade)	19
UK Singles (OCC)	12
US Billboard Hot 100	73
US Hot Rock & Alternative Songs (Billboard)	12
US Rock Airplay (Billboard)	18

2025 year-end chart performance for "Stargazing"
Chart (2025)	Position
Argentina Anglo Airplay (Monitor Latino)	97
Australia (ARIA)	32
Belgium (Ultratop 50 Flanders)	61
Belgium (Ultratop 50 Wallonia)	132
Canada (Canadian Hot 100)	20
Canada AC (Billboard)	1
Canada CHR/Top 40 (Billboard)	6
Canada Hot AC (Billboard)	4
Canada Mainstream Rock (Billboard)	82
Canada Modern Rock (Billboard)	54
CIS Airplay (TopHit)	126
Estonia Airplay (TopHit)	65
Global 200 (Billboard)	51
Lithuania Airplay (TopHit)	198
Sweden (Sverigetopplistan)	85
Switzerland (Schweizer Hitparade)	40
UK Singles (OCC)	25
US Billboard Hot 100	29
US Adult Contemporary (Billboard)	6
US Adult Pop Airplay (Billboard)	2
US Hot Rock & Alternative Songs (Billboard)	3
US Pop Airplay (Billboard)	4
US Rock & Alternative Airplay (Billboard)	6

== Certifications ==
Certifications for "Stargazing"
Region	Certification	Certified units/sales
Australia (ARIA)	6× Platinum	420,000^{‡}
Austria (IFPI Austria)	Platinum	30,000^{‡}
Belgium (BRMA)	2× Platinum	80,000^{‡}
Canada (Music Canada)	6× Platinum	480,000^{‡}
Denmark (IFPI Danmark)	2× Platinum	180,000^{‡}
France (SNEP)	Diamond	333,333^{‡}
Germany (BVMI)	Gold	300,000^{‡}
Hungary (MAHASZ)	3× Platinum	12,000^{‡}
Italy (FIMI)	Platinum	200,000^{‡}
Mexico (AMPROFON)	Gold	70,000^{‡}
Netherlands (NVPI)	Platinum	93,000^{‡}
New Zealand (RMNZ)	4× Platinum	120,000^{‡}
Norway (IFPI Norway)	2× Platinum	120,000^{‡}
Poland (ZPAV)	Platinum	50,000^{‡}
Portugal (AFP)	2× Platinum	50,000^{‡}
South Africa (RISA)	Platinum	40,000^{‡}
Spain (Promusicae)	Platinum	100,000^{‡}
Switzerland (IFPI Switzerland)	Platinum	30,000^{‡}
United Kingdom (BPI)	3× Platinum	1,800,000^{‡}
United States (RIAA)	4× Platinum	4,000,000^{‡}
Streaming
Sweden (GLF)	Platinum	12,000,000^{†}
^{‡} Sales+streaming figures based on certification alone.^{†} Streaming-only figures based on certification alone.

== Release history ==
Release history and formats for "Stargazing"
Region	Date	Format(s)	Version(s)	Label	Ref.
Worldwide	10 May 2024	digital,	Original	It's OK to Feel, Sony	
United States	18 June 2024	Contemporary hit radio	Original	It's OK to Feel, Sony	
