= Wait for You (EP) =

Wait For You

EP by The Basics
- Released: May 21, 2010
- Recorded: 2009–2010
- Genre: Indie pop
- Length: 28:54
- Label: Independent

The Basics chronology
Keep Your Friends Close (2009)	Wait For You (2010)	The Lucky Country (EP) (2014)

Wait For You is an EP released by Melbourne band The Basics. It was released on May 21, 2010 on CD format, and from online services such as iTunes. The EP contains 4 tracks recorded live at The Corner in 2009.

== Track listing ==
1. "Wait For You" – 3:37
2. "I Could Be Happy" – 3:58
3. "Get Me Down" – 5:27
4. "Happy Birthday" – 0:44
5. "Second Best" – 5:23
6. "Rattle My Chain" – 3:43
7. "Cocaine" – 6:10
