= Nice to Meet You (Myles Smith song) =

2024 single by Myles Smith

Single by Myles Smith

from the EP A Minute... and the album My Mess, My Heart, My Life.
- Released: 8 November 2024
- Genre: Folk-pop
- Length: 2:56
- Label: It's OK to Feel, Sony
- Songwriters: Myles Smith; Peter Fenn; Phil Plested; Dan Smith
- Producers: Myles Smith; Peter Fenn

Myles Smith singles chronology
"Whisper" (2024)	"Nice to Meet You" (2024)	"Blink Twice" (2025)

Music video
- "Nice to Meet You" on YouTube

"Nice to Meet You" is a song by the British singer and songwriter Myles Smith. It was released on 8 November 2024 as the fourth single from his second extended play A Minute.... It was later included on Smith's first album My Mess, My Heart, My Life.

Upon release, Smith shared this about the song: "It's inspired by stories from friends in my life. A reminder that the right person can change everything, often when you least expect it." A version featuring the American country singer Lainey Wilson was released on 14 February 2025.

The song's chorus bears a musical similarity to that of Donna Lewis' "I Love You Always Forever".

== Reception ==
In a review of the EP, Clash wrote that the song is "jaunty, snappy and irresistibly catchy, while also carrying lyrical depth."

Stay Free Radio said: "This track comfortably sits within the realm of feel-good acoustic pop, reminiscent of Coldplay and other artists in that vein. While it might not break new ground, it delivers a pleasant and enjoyable listening experience."

== Track listing ==
Digital download and streaming
No.	Title	Length
1.	"Nice to Meet You"	2:56

Digital download and streaming
No.	Title	Length
1.	"Nice to Meet You" (Mistletoe version)	2:56

Digital download and streaming
No.	Title	Length
1.	"Nice to Meet You" (Live from Chicago)	3:51

Digital download and streaming
No.	Title	Length
1.	"Nice to Meet You" (acoustic version)	2:56

Digital download and streaming
No.	Title	Length
1.	"Nice to Meet You" (featuring Lainey Wilson)	2:56

== Charts ==
=== Weekly charts ===
Weekly chart performance for "Nice to Meet You"
Chart (2024–2026)	Peak position
Australia (ARIA)	54
Austria (Ö3 Austria Top 40)	38
Belgium (Ultratop 50 Flanders)	6
Belgium (Ultratop 50 Wallonia)	10
Canada Hot 100 (Billboard)	21
Canada Modern Rock (Billboard Canada)	28
Colombia Anglo Airplay (National-Report)	6
CIS Airplay (TopHit)	53
Croatia International Airplay (Top lista)	7
Czech Republic Airplay (ČNS IFPI)	1
Czech Republic Singles Digital (ČNS IFPI)	5
Denmark Airplay (Tracklisten)	11
El Salvador Anglo Airplay (Monitor Latino)	7
El Salvador Anglo Airplay (Monitor Latino) Lainey Wilson version	5
Estonia Airplay (TopHit)	9
Estonia Airplay (TopHit) Lainey Wilson version	126
France (SNEP)	60
Germany (GfK)	32
Global 200 (Billboard)	117
Hungary (Editors' Choice Top 40)	6
Iceland (Tónlistinn)	27
Ireland (IRMA)	25
Japan Hot Overseas (Billboard Japan)	11
Latvia Airplay (LaIPA)	8
Lithuania Airplay (TopHit)	6
Malta Airplay (Radiomonitor)	2
Netherlands (Dutch Top 40)	7
Netherlands (Single Top 100)	28
New Zealand Hot Singles (RMNZ)	4
North Macedonia Airplay (Radiomonitor)	2
Norway Airplay (IFPI Norge)	2
Poland (Polish Airplay Top 100)	6
Portugal Airplay (AFP)	13
Puerto Rico Anglo Airplay (Monitor Latino)	10
Romania Airplay (TopHit)	25
San Marino Airplay (SMRTV Top 50)	12
Serbia Airplay (Radiomonitor)	8
Slovakia Airplay (ČNS IFPI)	1
Slovenia Airplay (Radiomonitor)	2
South Africa Airplay (TOSAC)	8
Sweden (Sverigetopplistan)	78
Sweden Airplay (Radiomonitor)	1
Switzerland (Schweizer Hitparade)	38
Switzerland Airplay (IFPI)	1
Ukraine Airplay (TopHit)	128
UK Singles (Official Charts)	6
US Billboard Hot 100	25
US Adult Contemporary (Billboard)	10
US Adult Pop Airplay (Billboard)	11
US Dance Airplay (Billboard)	32
US Hot Rock & Alternative Songs (Billboard)	3
US Pop Airplay (Billboard)	2
US Rock & Alternative Airplay (Billboard)	2
Venezuela Anglo Airplay (Monitor Latino)	9

=== Monthly charts ===
Monthly chart performance for "Nice to Meet You"
Chart (2024–2025)	Peak position
CIS Airplay (TopHit)	54
Czech Republic (Rádio Top 100)	3
Estonia Airplay (TopHit)	12
Lithuania Airplay (TopHit)	9
Romania Airplay (TopHit)	35
Slovakia (Rádio Top 100)	16

=== Year-end charts ===
Year-end chart performance for "Nice to Meet You"
Chart (2025)	Position
Australia (ARIA)	86
Austria (Ö3 Austria Top 40)	71
Belgium (Ultratop 50 Flanders)	10
Belgium (Ultratop 50 Wallonia)	25
Canada (Canadian Hot 100)	41
Canada AC (Billboard)	28
Canada CHR/Top 40 (Billboard)	39
Canada Hot AC (Billboard)	27
Canada Modern Rock (Billboard)	99
CIS Airplay (TopHit)	87
Estonia Airplay (TopHit)	39
France (SNEP)	111
Germany (GfK)	39
Lithuania Airplay (TopHit)	20
Netherlands (Dutch Top 40)	24
Netherlands (Single Top 100)	86
Poland (Polish Airplay Top 100)	63
Romania Airplay (TopHit)	77
Switzerland (Schweizer Hitparade)	63
UK Singles (OCC)	23
US Adult Pop Airplay (Billboard)	32
US Hot Rock & Alternative Songs (Billboard)	12
US Pop Airplay (Billboard)	36
US Rock & Alternative Airplay (Billboard)	10

== Certifications ==
Certifications for "Nice to Meet You"
Region	Certification	Certified units/sales
Belgium (BRMA)	Platinum	40,000^{‡}
Canada (Music Canada)	2× Platinum	160,000^{‡}
Denmark (IFPI Danmark)	Gold	45,000^{‡}
France (SNEP)	Platinum	200,000^{‡}
Italy (FIMI)	Gold	100,000^{‡}
New Zealand (RMNZ)	Platinum	30,000^{‡}
Spain (Promusicae)	Gold	50,000^{‡}
Switzerland (IFPI Switzerland)	Gold	15,000^{‡}
United Kingdom (BPI)	2× Platinum	1,200,000^{‡}
United States (RIAA)	Platinum	1,000,000^{‡}
^{‡} Sales+streaming figures based on certification alone.

== Release history ==
Release history and formats for "Nice to Meet You"
Region	Date	Format(s)	Version(s)	Label	Ref.
Worldwide	8 November 2024	digital download, radio	Original	It's OK to Feel, Sony	
United States	22 April 2025	Contemporary hit radio	Original	It's OK to Feel, Sony	
