= The Thin Green Line =

2007 documentary film by Sean Willmore

- Directed by: Sean Willmore
- Release date: 31 July 2007
- Country: Australia
- Language: English

The Thin Green Line is a documentary film, made by Australian Park Ranger Sean Willmore. In 2004 Willmore travelled the world, across six continents and nineteen countries, interviewing and filming the lives and stories of park rangers, recounting their experiences and difficulties.

The film premiered simultaneously in 50 countries on International Rangers Day, 31 July 2007, to an audience of about 15,000 people in 330 locations worldwide, including many of the more remote locations featured in the documentary. Following this event, Californian State Governor Arnold Schwarzenegger was inspired to declare 31 July California State Park Ranger Day.

The Thin Green Line is also the name of the not for profit foundation set up by Sean Willmore in the wake of the documentary's success. The aim of the foundation is to support rangers on the frontline, including the International Ranger Dependency Fund which supports the families of committed rangers who have lost their lives, or rangers who have been severely injured in the line of duty.

The Thin Green Line is also the title of a book in the series by Retired U.S Fish and Wildlife Service (USFWS) Agent Terry Grosz.

== See also ==
- The Thin Blue Line (emblem) - Variations includes "The Thin Green Line" use as a symbol
