= Gotye =

Belgian-Australian musician (born 1980)

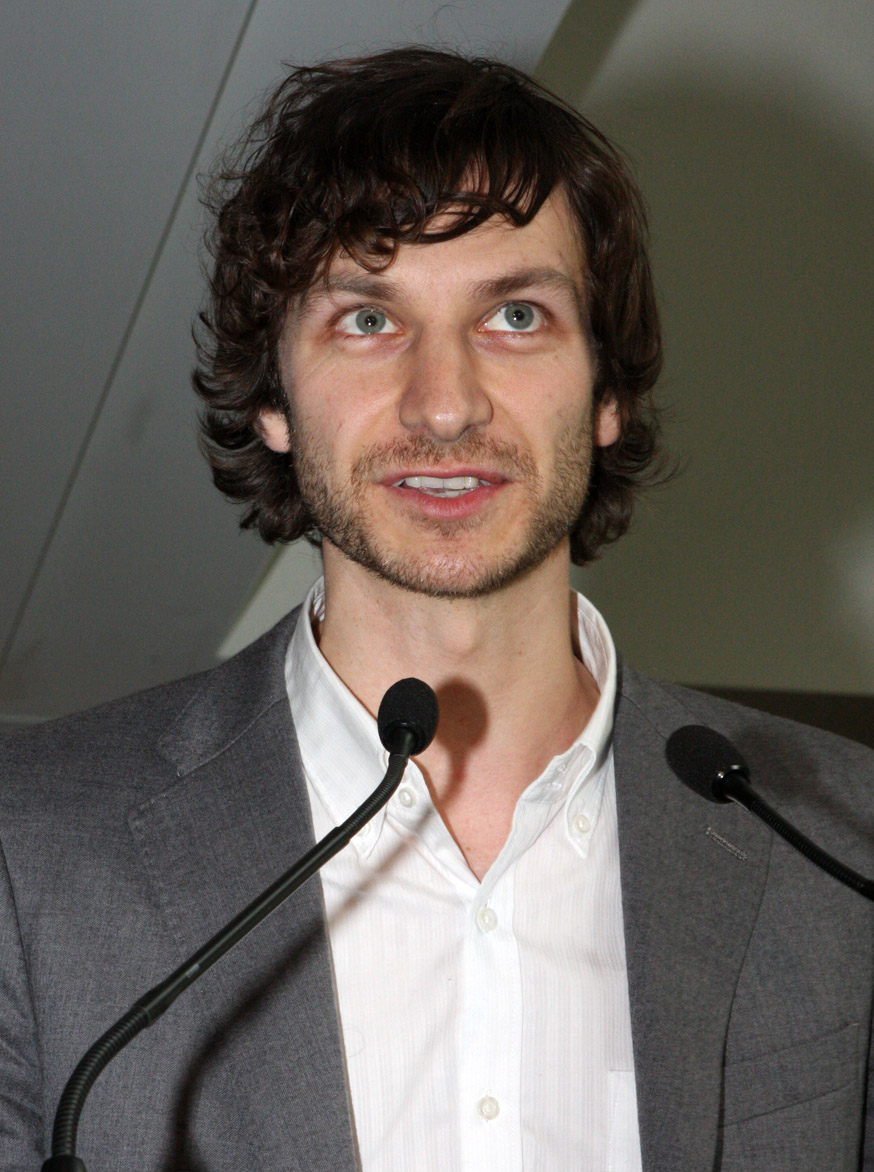
- Gotye in 2012

Background information
- Also known as: Walter De Backer
- Born: Wouter André De Backer; 21 May 1980 (age 46); Bruges, West Flanders, Belgium
- Origin: Melbourne, Victoria, Australia
- Genres: Indie rock; alternative rock; indie pop; trip hop
- Occupation: Singer-songwriter
- Instruments: Vocals; drums; percussion; keyboards; guitar; ondioline
- Years active: 2001–present
- Labels: Fairfax; Universal Republic; Samples 'n' Seconds; Inertia; Lucky Number; Eleven; Creative Vibes
- Member of: The Basics
- Website: gotye.com

Wouter André "Wally" De Backer (born 21 May 1980), known professionally as Gotye, is a Belgian-born Australian singer-songwriter and multi-instrumentalist. His 2011 single "Somebody That I Used to Know" (featuring Kimbra) topped the Billboard Hot 100, as well as several international charts, becoming one of the best-selling songs of 2012. He has won five ARIA Awards and received a nomination for an MTV EMA for Best Asia and Pacific Act. At the 55th Annual Grammy Awards, the song won Record of the Year and Best Pop Duo/Group Performance, while its parent album – Making Mirrors (2012) – won Best Alternative Music Album.

Gotye has released three studio albums independently and one album featuring remixes of tracks from his first two albums. He is a founding member of the Melbourne indie-pop trio the Basics, who have independently released five studio albums and numerous other titles since 2002.

== Early life and education ==
Born in Belgium, De Backer immigrated to Australia with his family at the age of two. They first resided in Sydney before settling in Montmorency, a suburb of Melbourne, Victoria. His mother nicknamed him "Gotye", based on "Gauthier", the French equivalent of his Flemish first name. His parents chose to use the English equivalent of his name, Walter, when enrolling him in school. He attended Parade College in Bundoora for his secondary schooling and served as school captain in his final year.

As a youth, De Backer displayed a passion for music, learning various instruments, most notably piano and drums. In 2012, De Backer recalled that as a teenager he used to listen "obsessively" to Depeche Mode's album Songs of Faith and Devotion, stating, "I could single-handedly credit that record with wanting me to make records." In his teens, De Backer formed the band Downstares with three of his high school friends, including Lucas Taranto (who still plays in his Gotye live shows). After high school, the members of Downstares went their separate ways, leaving De Backer with no musical outlet.

In 2001, his parents moved into a new home, leaving their old family house in Montmorency, so he could continue his studies at the University of Melbourne where he graduated with a Bachelor of Arts. Two friends moved in with him and the house became affectionately known as The Frat House, where friends would regularly drop by and hang out. The first seeds of Gotye were planted when De Backer was given a large collection of old records. An elderly neighbour, having heard Downstares rehearsing over the years, gave his then-recently deceased wife's LP record collection to De Backer.

== Career ==
=== 2001–2004: Boardface ===
In 2001, De Backer recorded his first tracks primarily using samples. He put together a four-track CD which included the song "Out Here in the Cold". He made approximately 50 copies of this first collection, handwriting the track list and colouring in the cover sleeve in pencil. He named the project Gotye. He sent the CDs out to every radio station and recording industry contact he could find in the phonebook, then followed each up with phone calls to ensure they were delivered. Feedback on the first release was mainly positive with Melbourne street press and Australian alternative, youth orientated radio station Triple J taking notice, giving him confidence to continue with further sample-based recordings.

Around this time, Gotye met fellow singer-songwriter Kris Schroeder at a party in Mt Eliza, and the two began performing together under the name The Basics. They formed an enduring songwriting and performing partnership and became regulars on the live music scene, giving De Backer an outlet for his passion for live performance. The Basics have continued to tour and record alongside Gotye, releasing four albums between 2004 and 2010.

De Backer went on to produce two more four-track Gotye collections which were met with positive reviews, with several tracks getting onto the rotation at youth radio station Triple J. The CDs were made in the same style as the first, with De Backer hand crafting each one and tenaciously chasing up every opportunity to get an audience for his work. Interest in the Gotye project was growing, and De Backer was eventually offered a distribution deal by the label company Creative Vibes for an album, which would essentially be a collection of the tracks from his three earlier releases. The album art is a painting of De Backer's father that was salvaged from his home garden where it was discarded. His album was released as Boardface in late 2003.

=== 2006–2009: Like Drawing Blood ===
In 2004, De Backer's parents opted to sell The Frat House and De Backer moved into a shared house in the South East of Melbourne. He took up work at a local library, while continuing to perform with The Basics and record his own Gotye tracks. Over the next few years, De Backer moved several times, each time shifting his home recording studio to a new location with new acoustic qualities. The culmination of this was the second Gotye album, Like Drawing Blood—named in reference to the difficulties De Backer experienced in recording his music in ever-changing environments. The album marked the beginning of his working relationship with long term manager Danny Rogers – manager of Australian indie band The Temper Trap – whom he had first approached via email.

Like Drawing Blood was featured by Triple J in May 2006 and was voted No. 1 in the listener poll of the Best Album of 2006. The album was also nominated for a J Award that year. Two tracks from that album, "Learnalilgivinanlovin" and "Hearts a Mess", were ranked No. 94 and No. 8 respectively in Triple J's Hottest 100 for 2006. Like Drawing Blood has been certified Platinum in Australia for sales of over 70,000 copies. His first single, "Learnalilgivinanlovin", was released in August 2006.

In September 2006, Gotye was nominated for an ARIA Award for best independent release for the album Like Drawing Blood. Also in 2006 Gotye won 'Most Outstanding New Independent Artist' at the inaugural Australian Independent Record (AIR) Chart Awards and Like Drawing Blood was amongst nine shortlisted finalists in the 2006 Australian Music Prize.

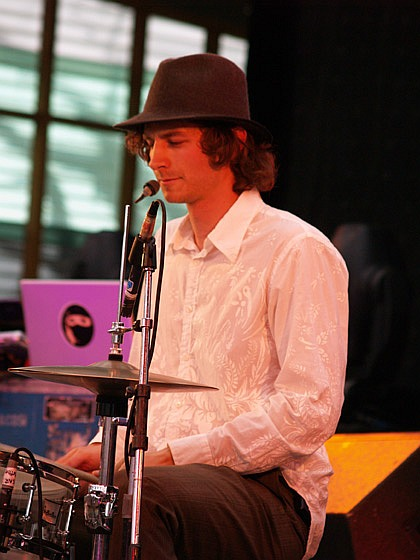
Gotye at the Golden Plains Festival 2007

In 2007, De Backer won the ARIA for best male artist. As a result of the publicity of the nomination, Like Drawing Blood re-entered the ARIA albums chart at No. 36, surpassing the previous peak of No. 39. Also, Mixed Blood debuted on the ARIA albums chart at No. 44. Both of these entries came the first week after the ARIA Awards. In 2008, Like Drawing Blood won iTunes album of the year in the UK.

In 2009, "Hearts a Mess" came in at No. 77 in Triple J's Hottest 100 of All Time, voted by the Australian public. Gotye's first European success came in 2008, when "Learnalilgivinanlovin" and "Hearts a Mess" charted in Belgium, followed in 2009 by the single "Coming back". "Learnalilgivinanlovin" also received air play on Dutch radio stations. In 2011, Like Drawing Blood came in at No. 11 in Triple J's Hottest 100 Australian Albums of All Time. Amidst the lead-up to Gotye's third album, Like Drawing Blood re-entered the ARIA charts in mid-2011, peaking at its highest ever position of 13.

Like Drawing Blood was officially released in the U.S. in 2012.

=== 2010–2013: Making Mirrors and international success ===
After the success of Like Drawing Blood, De Backer was able to establish a permanent home, still in Melbourne's south east. In 2010, he set up a recording studio in a barn at his parents' farm and set about recording tracks for his third album. He released a new single, "Eyes Wide Open", online and on 10" vinyl in mid-October 2010. The "Eyes Wide Open" single received generally positive reviews and reached Number 25 on the Triple J Hottest 100 of 2010. "Eyes Wide Open" was also shortlisted for the 2011 APRA Music Awards in the Song of the Year category.

In late March 2011, De Backer revealed the next album's title to be Making Mirrors. The title was inspired by an artwork his father painted in the 1980s, discovered by De Backer among old bills and newspapers in his parents' barn; it was later edited in Photoshop to become the album artwork. "The mirror reflects on artwork and it is all very related to self-reflection and introspection on the album." De Backer also revealed that the album would see a release in June or July 2011, with a single to precede the release. De Backer also stated that the album would be similar to its predecessor in terms of diversity.

The album was released on 19 August, and launched the following day at the Sydney Opera House as part of the Graphic Festival which featured animators and a 10-piece orchestra as part of Gotye's performance. De Backer also released a follow-up single to "Eyes Wide Open" titled "Somebody That I Used to Know", featuring New Zealand musician Kimbra, which was released on 6 July 2011 and debuted at Number 27 on the ARIA Top 50 Singles Chart. The single quickly moved up the ARIA singles chart despite a lack of airplay on commercial radio stations. The song was further boosted by endorsements from Ashton Kutcher and Lily Allen via Twitter, exposing Gotye's music to their millions of followers. The single reached number one on the Billboard Hot 100 and became the best-selling song of 2012. This made him the fifth Australian-based artist to top the chart and the second born in Belgium (after The Singing Nun in 1963).

The single has gone on to reach 11× Platinum status (770,000 units sold) in Australia and 8× Platinum status (8,000,000 units sold) in the US. It has peaked at Number 1 in 18 countries including the Australian ARIA Singles Chart, the Belgian Singles Chart, the Dutch Megacharts, the German Media Control Chart, the Official UK Top 40 and the US Billboard Hot 100. "Somebody That I Used to Know" has been the Number 1 single on iTunes in 46 countries.

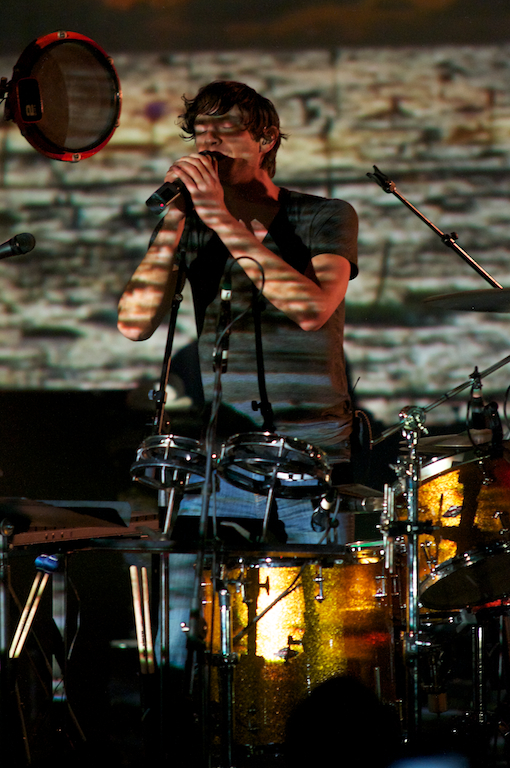
Gotye in Montreal on 30 March 2012

On 5 July 2011, Gotye released a music video for the song "Somebody That I Used to Know" on YouTube and Vimeo. Directed by Natasha Pincus, the video has now been viewed over 2.4 billion times (as of April 2025). On 6 October 2011, the video was awarded the Melbourne Design Award.

"Somebody That I Used to Know" came in third in the 2011 Vanda & Young Global Songwriting Competition. On 8 August 2011, Gotye released a music video for the song "Bronte" on YouTube and Vimeo. The visuals were animated and directed by Ari Gibson at Mechanical Apple. Also on this date, Gotye released a video titled "Making Making Mirrors", which is a short documentary about the recording process of "Making Mirrors". The video was directed by James Bryans and Wally De Backer. On 13 August 2011, Gotye released a music video for the song "State of the Art" on YouTube and Vimeo. The visuals were animated and directed by Greg Sharp & Ivan Dixon at Rubber House.

In its first week of release, Making Mirrors was already at Number 1 on the Australian ARIA albums chart, making Gotye the first Australian act to simultaneously hold both the Number 1 single and album since Silverchair in 2007. The album became an international success, charting in the Top 10 in 17 countries and reaching Number 1 in six. It charted on the U.S. Billboard 200 (Number 7) and in Canada. The album is 3× Platinum status in Australia, Platinum in France, Poland and Belgium, and Gold in the US, New Zealand, Germany, UK, Ireland, Canada and Netherlands.

On 11 October 2011, Gotye was nominated for seven ARIA Awards. Due to the release date restrictions of the eligibility period, Making Mirrors could not be nominated, and the seven nominations all related to "Somebody That I Used to Know". Gotye was nominated for Highest Selling Single, Single of the Year, Best Pop Release, Best Male Artist and three awards in the ARIA Artisan category: Best Video (Natasha Pincus), Engineer of the Year (François Tétaz) and Producer of the Year (De Backer). On the same day the nominations were revealed, the winners of the Artisan categories were announced, with Gotye and the album personnel winning all three. On 27 November 2011, Gotye won three ARIA Awards: Best Male Artist, Best Pop Release and Single of the Year for "Somebody That I Used to Know". Kimbra, who collaborated with Gotye on the song, also won the ARIA award for Best Female Artist.

On 18 October 2011, Gotye released a music video for the song "Don't Worry, We'll Be Watching You" on YouTube and Vimeo. The visuals were animated and directed by Benjamin Drake and Eddie White. On 20 November 2011, Gotye released a music video for the song "Don't Worry, We'll Be Watching You" on YouTube and Vimeo. The visuals were animated and directed by Greg Sharp and Ivan Dixon at Rubber House.

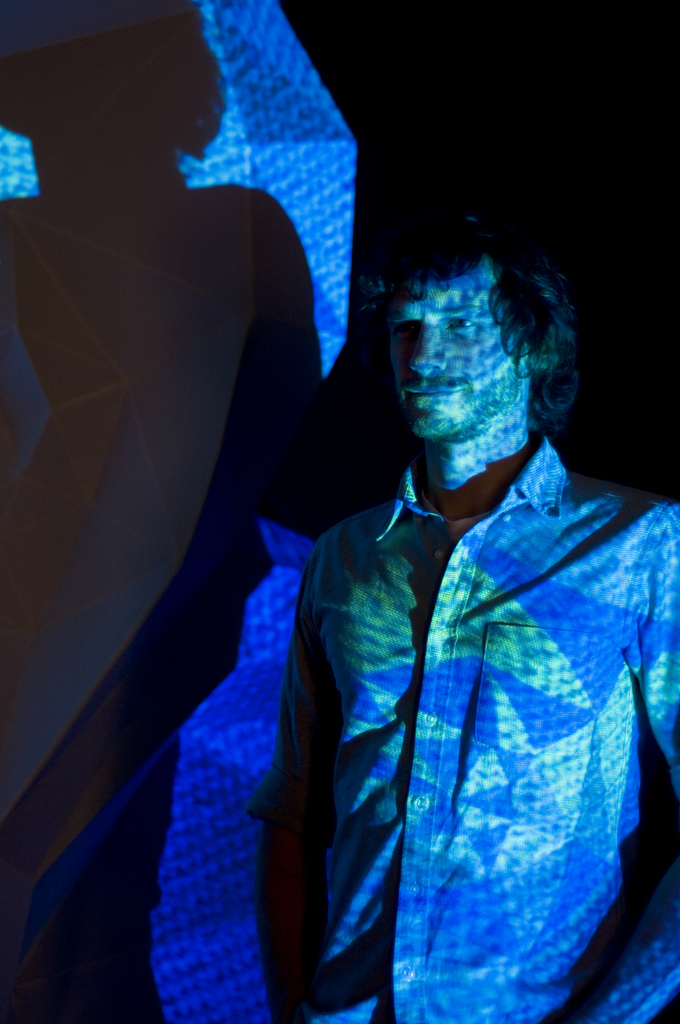
Gotye in front of Fractured Heart (2013)

On 1 February 2012, Gotye made his American television debut on Jimmy Kimmel Live!, performing "Eyes Wide Open", "Somebody That I Used to Know" with Kimbra and "State of The Art". On 12 February 2012, "Somebody That I Used to Know" reached Number 1 on the UK singles chart. The next week it fell from the top spot but on 26 February it reached the top spot for a second time, where it remained for a total of five weeks. On 24 February 2012, Gotye released a music video for the song "Easy Way Out" on YouTube and Vimeo.This video won the award of Best Music Video at the 2013 Byron Bay International Film Festival.

Gotye performed "Somebody That I Used to Know" on Saturday Night Live on 14 April 2012 along with "Eyes Wide Open". These collective performances helped the single to reach Number 1 on the Billboard Hot 100 for the week ending 28 April 2012, giving Gotye his first U.S. Number 1 single; the first Australian artist to reach Number 1 in the U.S. since Savage Garden in 2000. In April 2012, "Somebody That I Used to Know" broke a 47-year-old record in the Netherlands by becoming the most successful song in the history of the Dutch charts. Gotye was interviewed on 7 April 2012 broadcast of National Public Radio's All Things Considered.

The magazine American Songwriter named Gotye their Writer of the Week for the week of 6 February 2012. On 31 May 2012, Gotye announced that he would release a digital compilation of the 10 official remixes of "Somebody That I Used to Know" on 8 June.

On 15 February 2013, Fractured Heart, an interactive sound and light sculpture designed and built by illuminart in collaboration with Gotye, was launched at the National Film and Sound Archive (NFSA) headquarters in Canberra, Australia. Gotye also curated and presented a special screening of works by some of his favourite animators, including those who have worked with him on the music videos for "Hearts a Mess", "Easy Way Out" and "State of the Art".

=== 2014–2019: Hiatus and preserving the Jean-Jacques Perrey legacy ===
In 2014, Gotye performed with Tex Perkins and Nicky Bomba in support of The Thin Green Line Foundation. He also launched Spirit Level, an independent record label with Tim Shiel, signing American band Zammuto. Later in 2014, De Backer claimed in an online newsletter that "there will be no new Gotye music," but maintained the possibility that the project could continue in the future. He remained active as a drummer and singer of The Basics, who released The Lucky Country in 2014 and The Age of Entitlement in 2015. Although the band formed a political party named "The Basics Rock 'n' Roll Party" ahead of the 2014 Victorian state election, De Backer denied reports that he intended to enter politics himself.

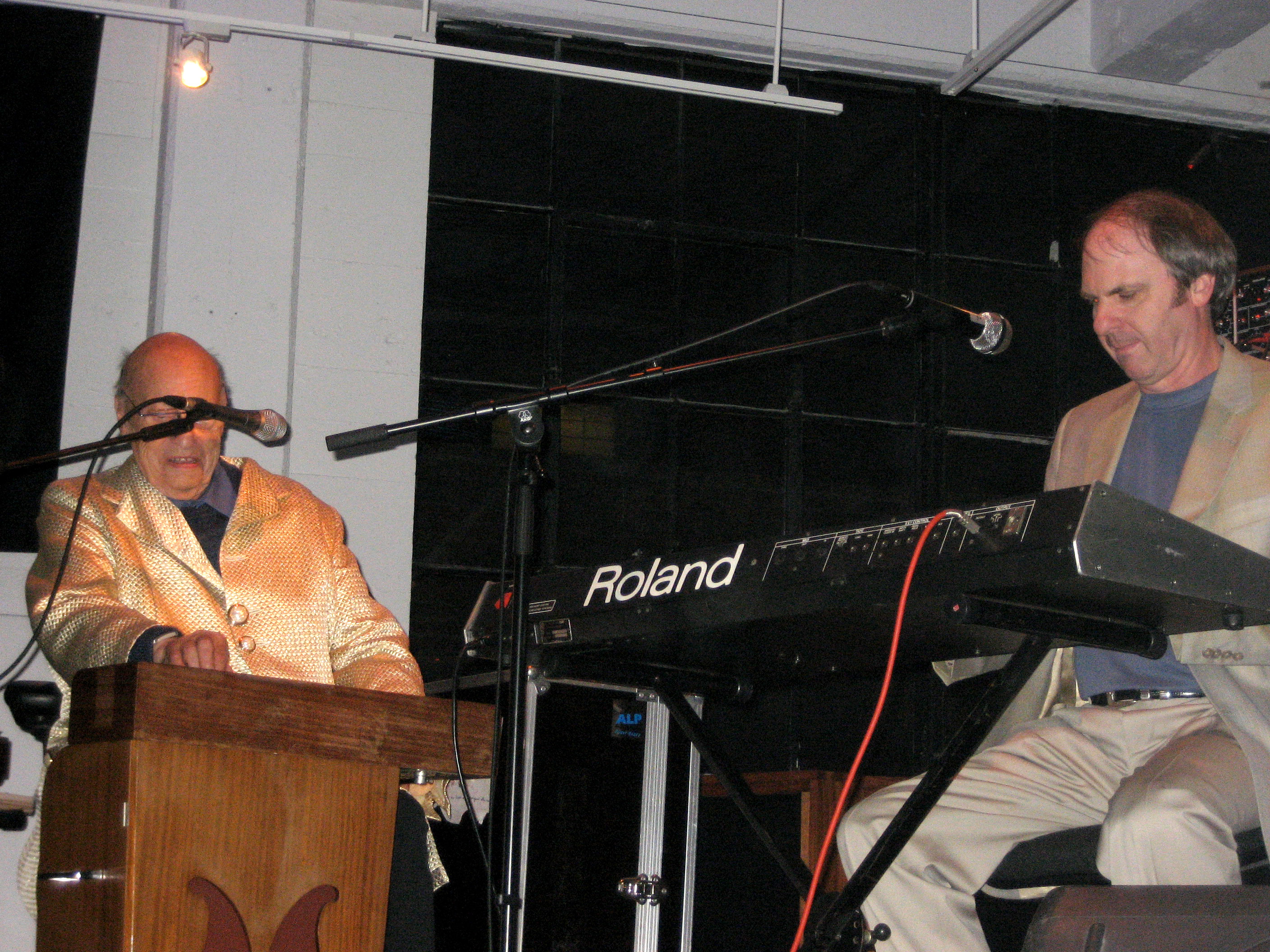
Perrey playing a Ondioline and Countryman playing a Roland synthesizer

Gotye featured as vocalist on "The Way You Talk", a track from English electronic musician Bibio's 2016 album A Mineral Love, and "The Outfield", the 2017 debut single from American rock singer Martin Johnson's The Night Game project. In 2017, Gotye revealed that he chose not to allow online advertising on his music videos, including that of "Somebody That I Used to Know" which had then been viewed nearly one billion times on YouTube, thereby foregoing up to millions of dollars in advertising revenue.

On 22 November 2016, De Backer debuted his group Ondioline Orchestra in New York, in which he paid tribute to Jean-Jacques Perrey. Perrey, who was originally going to attend this tribute, died at the age of 87 on 4 November. In May 2017, De Backer launched a new record label, Forgotten Futures, whose first release was Jean-Jacques Perrey et son Ondioline, a compilation of rare and previously unreleased Perrey recordings.

In a 2018 interview with Australia's Broadsheet, De Backer said, "You can dial in an incredibly wide range of sounds on the ondioline, and the unique mechanics for playing it allows you to create sounds very sensitively and with a musical deftness I just feel isn't present on most other electronic instruments from the '40s – or decades since." On 13 February 2018, De Backer and his Ondioline Orchestra performed Circuit Breakers: Gotye Presents a Tribute to Jean-Jacques Perrey at Roulette's Mixology Festival 2018, in New York.

In March 2018, Les Campbell released an album entitled Pulling the Stitching Out, with all 10 tracks featuring Gotye. In July 2018, De Backer's partner Maud gave birth to a daughter, Léonie. In August 2018, Gotye co-wrote an original verse for and was sampled in the Broods' single "Eyes a Mess", using his early hit single "Hearts a Mess", released in 2006, and "Eyes Wide Open" (2010). In November 2019, The Basics released a fifth studio album, B.A.S.I.C..

=== 2020: Live at The Songroom and planned fourth studio album ===
In July 2020, Gotye released a live album entitled Live at The Songroom (Season 2, Episode 9). It was recorded in 2018 for a web series by his bandmates from The Basics, who feature on the album alongside Monty Cotton.

Gotye has stated his intention to release a fourth studio album; most recently in June 2018, when he mentioned a tribute to Perrey that would be included on the record.

=== Recurring chart success of "Somebody That I Used to Know" ===
In 2024, "Somebody That I Used to Know" was remixed by Fisher, Chris Lake and Sante Sansone.

The song "Anxiety" by rapper Doechii, which extensively samples "Somebody That I Used to Know", was first issued in 2019, then remixed and reissued in 2025, when it reached number 9 on the U.S. Billboard charts. It topped the charts in Australia, Greece, Latvia, New Zealand, and Switzerland, and charted in the top ten in various countries, including Romania, Austria, Germany, Ireland, Lithuania, France, Norway, and the United Kingdom.

== Musical styles ==
Gotye's musical style is eclectic, incorporating indie rock, alternative rock, indie pop, and trip hop.

His voice has been compared to those of Peter Gabriel and Sting.

== Discography ==
- Boardface (2003)
- Like Drawing Blood (2006)
- Making Mirrors (2011)

== Awards and nominations ==
Year	Ceremony	Nominated work	Category	Result
2006	Australian Music Prize	Like Drawing Blood	Australian Music Prize	Nominated
2006	AIR Awards	Himself	Most Outstanding New Independent Artist	Won
2006	ARIA Music Awards	Like Drawing Blood	Best Independent Release	Nominated
2007	AIR Awards	Himself	Best Independent Artist	Nominated
2007	AIR Awards	Mixed Blood	Best Independent Dance/Electronic Album	Nominated
2007	ARIA Music Awards	Mixed Blood	Album of the Year	Nominated
2007	ARIA Music Awards	Mixed Blood	Best Male Artist	Won
2007	ARIA Music Awards	Mixed Blood	Best Dance Release	Nominated
2007	ARIA Music Awards	Mixed Blood	Best Independent Release	Nominated
2007	ARIA Music Awards	Mixed Blood	Best Cover Art	Nominated
2007	ARIA Music Awards	"Heart's a Mess"	Best Video	Nominated
2007	EG Awards	Himself	Best Male	Won
2011	Vanda & Young Global Songwriting Competition	"Somebody That I Used to Know"	Vanda & Young Global Songwriting Competition	3rd
2011	ARIA Music Awards	"Somebody That I Used to Know"	Single of the Year	Won
2011	ARIA Music Awards	"Somebody That I Used to Know"	Highest Selling Single	Nominated
2011	ARIA Music Awards	"Somebody That I Used to Know"	Best Pop Release	Won
2011	ARIA Music Awards	"Somebody That I Used to Know"	Best Video (director Natasha Pincus)	Won
2011	ARIA Music Awards	"Somebody That I Used to Know"	Engineer of the Year (François Tétaz)	Won
2011	ARIA Music Awards	"Somebody That I Used to Know"	Producer of the Year (Himself)	Won
2011	ARIA Music Awards	Himself	Best Male Artist	Won
2011	MTV Europe Music Awards	Himself	Best Asia and Pacific Act	Nominated
2011	EG Awards	Himself	Best Male	Won
2011	EG Awards	"Somebody That I Used to Know"	Best Song	Won
2011	EG Awards	Himself	Outstanding Achievement By a Victorian Artist	Won
2012	Los Premios 40 Principales	"Somebody That I Used to Know"	Mejor Canción Internacional en Lengua No Española	Nominated
2012	Los Premios 40 Principales	Himself	Mejor Artista Revelación 2012	Nominated
2012	APRA Music Awards	"Somebody That I Used to Know"	Most-played Australian work	Won
2012	APRA Music Awards	"Somebody That I Used to Know"	Song of the Year	Won
2012	APRA Music Awards	"I Feel Better"	Song of the Year	Shortlisted
2012	APRA Music Awards	Himself	Songwriter of the Year	Won
2012	Teen Choice Awards	Himself	Choice Breakout Artist	Nominated
2012	Teen Choice Awards	"Somebody That I Used to Know"	Choice Rock Song	Nominated
2012	Teen Choice Awards	"Somebody That I Used to Know"	Choice Break-Up Song	Nominated
2012	MTV Europe Music Awards	Himself	Best Australia & New Zealand Act	Won
2012	MTV Europe Music Awards	Himself	Best Asia and Pacific Act	Nominated
2012	MTV Europe Music Awards	Himself	Best Push Act	Nominated
2012	MTV Europe Music Awards	"Somebody That I Used to Know"	Best Song	Nominated
2012	American Music Awards	Himself	Favorite Alternative Rock Artist	Nominated
2012	American Music Awards	Himself	Best New Artist of the Year	Nominated
2012	ARIA Music Awards	Making Mirrors	Album of the Year	Won
2012	ARIA Music Awards	Making Mirrors	Best Pop Release	Won
2012	ARIA Music Awards	Making Mirrors	Best Cover Artist (Frank de Backer, Himself)	Won
2012	ARIA Music Awards	Making Mirrors	Engineer of the Year (François Tétaz)	Won
2012	ARIA Music Awards	Making Mirrors	Best Male Artist (Himself)	Won
2012	ARIA Music Awards	Himself	Best Australian Live Act	Won
2012	Echo Music Prize	Himself	Best International Newcomer	Nominated
2012	Echo Music Prize	Himself	Best International Male	Nominated
2012	Echo Music Prize	"Somebody That I Used to Know"	Hit of the Year	Won
2013	APRA Music Awards	"Somebody That I Used to Know"	Most Played Australian Work Overseas	Won
2013	APRA Music Awards	"Easy Way Out"	Song of the Year	Shortlisted
2013	APRA Music Awards	"Save Me"	Song of the Year	Shortlisted
2013	People's Choice Awards	Himself	Favorite Breakout Artist	Nominated
2013	Grammy Awards	"Somebody That I Used to Know" (feat. Kimbra)	Record of the Year	Won
2013	Grammy Awards	"Somebody That I Used to Know" (feat. Kimbra)	Best Pop Duo/Group Performance	Won
2013	Grammy Awards	Making Mirrors	Best Alternative Music Album	Won
2013	Music Victoria Awards	Gotye	Best Male	Nominated
2018	Helpmann Awards	Gotye Presents a Tribute to Jean-Jacques Perrey	Best Australian Contemporary Concert	Won
2025	ARIA Music Awards	"Somebody (2024)" (Fisher and Chris Lake featuring Kimbra and Sante Sansone)	Song of the Year	Nominated
