= The Age of Entitlement =

Studio album by The Basics
- Released: 14 August 2015
- Recorded: March–April 2014
- Length: 38:38

The Basics chronology
Keep Your Friends Close (2009)	The Age of Entitlement (2015)	In the Rude! (2017)

Professional ratings
Review scores
Source	Rating
The Music	4.5/5 stars

The Age of Entitlement is the fourth studio album by The Basics. It was released on 14 August 2015 both digitally and physically. The album title is pulled from the title of Australian treasurer Joe Hockey's infamous 2014 budget speech.

The album was the first after the band reunited in 2012, and followed the success of Wally de Backer as a solo artist under the name Gotye and a period of Kris Schroeder working in Kenya with the Red Cross.

The album was recorded at Abbey Road Studios from 28 March 2014 to 2 April 2014, and was mixed by chief engineer Peter Cobbin.

The record was made available for pre-order as a digital download (via Waterfront and iTunes store fronts), a CD, and as a 180gm vinyl. All vinyl and CD purchases made prior to the 14 July 2015 cut-off date received a special 3B Records badge-button, a collection of "Postcards from Abbey Road" and an exclusive 'pre-order only' download album of demos and rehearsals titled The Path To Entitlement.

== Track listing ==
No.	Title	Length
1.	"Whatever Happened to the Working Class?"	3:31
2.	"A Coward's Prayer"	4:49
3.	"Roundabout"	2:57
4.	"Time Poor"	2:24
5.	"Good Times, Sunshine!"	2:38
6.	"Every Part of Me"	3:20
7.	"To Think of You"	2:54
8.	"Ashleigh Wakes"	3:25
9.	"Tunaomba Saidia"	3:37
10.	"Hey Rain!"	3:50
11.	"Feels Like Love"	5:13
12.	"I'm a Woman" (Waterfront bonus track)	3:34
13.	"Gimme Some Lovin' (Live at the Corner Hotel)" (Waterfront bonus track)	3:09
14.	"Jailbreak (Live at the Corner Hotel)" (Waterfront bonus track)	5:32
15.	"Call It Rhythm & Blues (Live at the Corner Hotel)" (Waterfront bonus track)	4:04
16.	"My Old Mate" (iTunes bonus track)	3:07
17.	"The Lucky Country (Live from the Truck)" (iTunes bonus track)	4:06

== Charts ==
Chart (2015)	Peak position
Australian Albums (ARIA)	60
100% Independent Albums Chart (AIR)	6
