= A Minute... =

EP by Myles Smith
- Released: 8 November 2024
- Length: 21:54
- Labels: It's Okay to Feel; Sony UK
- Producers: Myles Smith; Peter Fenn

Myles Smith chronology
You Promised a Lifetime (2024)	A Minute... (2024)	A Minute, a Moment... (2025)

Singles from A Minute...
- 1. "Stargazing" Released: 10 May 2024; 2. "Wait for You" Released: 23 August 2024; 3. "Whisper" Released: 4 October 2024; 4. "Nice to Meet You" Released: 8 November 2024

A Minute... is the second extended play (EP) by British singer and songwriter Myles Smith. It was released on 8 November 2024 by It's Okay to Feel and Sony Music UK.

Upon release, Smith said "My last EP captured where I was then, but I've grown a lot since—both personally and as an artist. This project reflects that growth."

== Reception ==
Professional ratings
Review scores
Source	Rating
AllMusic	3/5 stars
Clash	7/10
Industry Me	8/10

Timothy Monger from AllMusic said "A Minute... blends lush pop production with poignant folk that recalls U.K. forebears like Ed Sheeran, Marcus Mumford and even a bit of Coldplay."

Robin Murray from Clash said "A Minute... ably builds on his debut, sketching out a persona that feels fresh but also recognisable."

Jane Sophia from Industry Me said "The music here is so naturally written that you can sing along from the first listen, and the melodies are easy enough that you can do exactly that. It is a testament to male emotion, encouraging feeling and maturity. The incredible writing of Myles Smith takes your heart in hand and shows you the world with the other."

Amal AlTauqi from Pause Magazine said "As a whole, A Minute... is a musical journey that pulls you into the complexities of human connection—those delicate, sometimes painful, but always beautiful intersections where we grow, change, and reflect."

== Track listing ==
A Minute... track listing
No.	Title	Writer(s)	Producer(s)	Length
1.	"Nice to Meet You"	Myles Smith; Peter Fenn; Daniel Smith; Phil Plested	Peter Fenn; Myles Smith	2:56
2.	"Stargazing"	M. Smith; Fenn; Jesse Fink	Fenn	2:52
3.	"Waste" (featuring James Bay)	M. Smith; Fenn; Steph Jones; Fink; James Bay	Fenn; M. Smith	3:31
4.	"Wait for You"	M. Smith; Fenn; Fink	Fenn	3:21
5.	"Whisper"	M. Smith; Fenn; D. Smith	Fenn	3:14
6.	"3am"	M. Smith; Fenn; Jones; Fink	Fenn; M. Smith	2:39
7.	"Little by Little"	M. Smith; Fenn	Fenn; M. Smith	3:21
Total length:				21:54

== Charts ==
=== Weekly charts ===
Weekly chart performance for A Minute...
Chart (2024–2025)	Peak position
Belgian Albums (Ultratop Flanders)	168
Canadian Albums (Billboard)	30
Irish Albums (IRMA)	88
Lithuanian Albums (AGATA)	88
New Zealand Albums (RMNZ)	40
Norwegian Albums (VG-lista)	14
Portuguese Albums (AFP)	120
Scottish Albums (Official Charts)	13
UK Albums (Official Charts)	32
US Billboard 200	99
US Americana/Folk Albums (Billboard)	9
US Top Rock & Alternative Albums (Billboard)	21

=== Year-end charts ===
Year-end chart performance for A Minute...
Chart (2025)	Position
French Albums (SNEP)	119

== Certifications ==
Certifications for A Minute…
Region	Certification	Certified units/sales
Canada (Music Canada)	Gold	40,000^{‡}
Switzerland (IFPI Switzerland)	Gold	10,000^{‡}
United Kingdom (BPI)	Gold	100,000^{‡}
^{‡} Sales+streaming figures based on certification alone.
