= Wait for You (Myles Smith song) =

2024 single by Myles Smith

Single by Myles Smith

from the EP A Minute...
- Released: 23 August 2024
- Length: 3:21
- Label: It's OK to Feel, Sony
- Songwriters: Myles Smith; Peter Fenn; Jesse Fink
- Producer: Fenn

Myles Smith singles chronology
"Stargazing" (2024)	"Wait for You" (2024)	"Whisper" (2024)

"Wait for You" is a song by British singer-songwriter Myles Smith. It was released on 23 August 2024 as the second single from his second EP A Minute....

In a statement, Smith describes the song as "an introspective and deeply emotional track". Smith added "It delves into the struggle of watching a friend (my previous self) battle their inner demons and their commitment to stand by them through their darkest times. The lyrics reflect a promise of unwavering support and patience, capturing the essence of a relationship that transcends time and hardship."

== Reception ==
Lara Thissen from Melo Maniac Mag wrote: "The song has a beautiful melody that builds up its strength and takes up pace towards the end. The musician has this stunning talent to layer his harmonies in a way that makes listening to the song feel like it's a first time experience all over again, no matter how many times you've actually listened to the song already."

== Charts ==
=== Weekly charts ===
Weekly chart performance for "Wait for You"
Chart (2024)	Peak position
Belgium (Ultratop 50 Flanders)	31
Netherlands (Dutch Top 40)	7
Netherlands (Single Top 100)	56
New Zealand Hot Singles (RMNZ)	17
Sweden Heatseeker (Sverigetopplistan)	5
UK Singles (OCC)	53
US Hot Rock & Alternative Songs (Billboard)	33

=== Year-end charts ===
2024 year-end chart performance for "Wait for You"
Chart (2024)	Position
Netherlands (Dutch Top 40)	68

2025 year-end chart performance for "Wait for You"
Chart (2025)	Position
Netherlands (Dutch Top 40)	90

== Certifications ==
Region	Certification	Certified units/sales
Canada (Music Canada)	Gold	40,000^{‡}
United Kingdom (BPI)	Silver	200,000^{‡}
United States (RIAA)	Gold	500,000^{‡}
^{‡} Sales+streaming figures based on certification alone.
