= The Basics =

Australian rock band

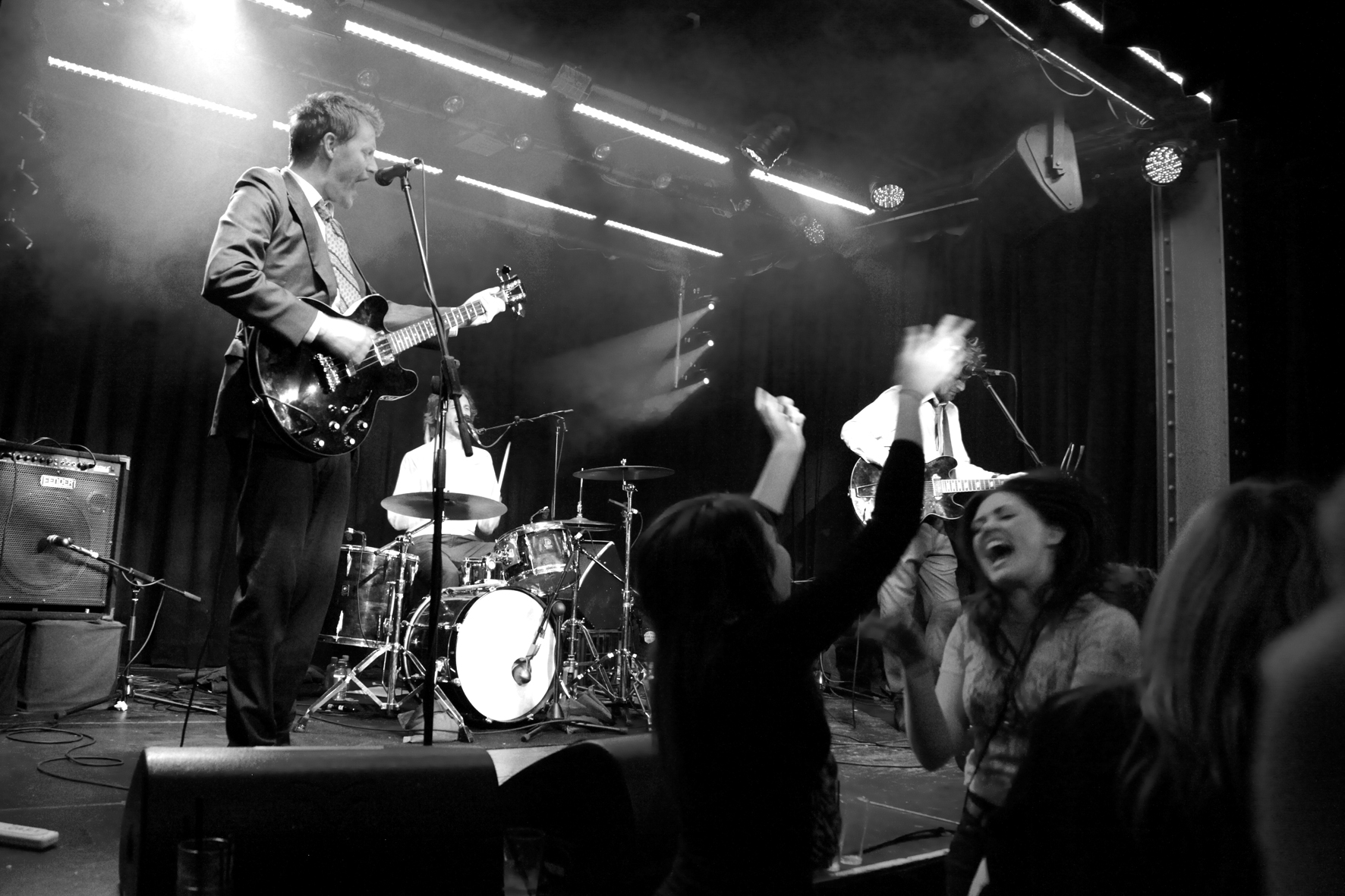
- The Basics at the Oxford Art Factory on June 10, 2010

Background information
- Origin: Melbourne, Australia
- Genre: Rock
- Years active: 2002–present
- Labels: Independent, Albert
- Members: Wally De Backer; Kris Schroeder; Tim Heath
- Past members: Michael Hubbard
- Website: www.thebasics.com.au

The Basics are an Australian band, formed by Wally De Backer and Kris Schroeder in 2002, later joined by Tim Heath. Their style has been described as anything from 'indie-pop' to 'rock'n'roll', though their records show they span a wide range of genres, including reggae, pop-rock, folk, country, and electro-pop.

== History ==
=== Formation ===
The Basics were formed after Schroeder met De Backer at the March 2002 "going away party" in Melbourne of now LA-based engineer/producer Chris "Tek" O'Ryan. The event was to see off the young aspiring producer, who was about to depart for Los Angeles, and together with a number of musician friends, the two jammed on some blues-rock standards. Later that night, they bonded over a mutual love of The Beatles, 1970s and 1980s cartoon theme songs and old Sierra adventure games.

Initially, they played around Melbourne as an acoustic guitar/drums combo, starting at The Opposition in Frankston and the House of Fools in Footscray, where in late 2002 they met Michael Hubbard and later invited him to join them on electric guitar. Though lacking any real experience with the instrument, Schroeder willingly purchased his first bass guitar, and the trio was born. During this time, the group start performing songs with more complicated three-part harmony.

During late 2002 and early 2003, The Basics recorded and released an album called Get Back through MGM Distribution. They began what was to become regular tours of the East and West coasts of Australia.

=== 2004–2005: Current lineup ===
Tim Heath joined the group in June 2004, after Hubbard decided to pursue his solo career, which has included being one half of Down Hills Home. Heath was reportedly the only person to reply to an advertisement in Melbourne's Beat Magazine looking for a new guitarist. Heath apparently answered the advertisement – which said the applicant "must have a love of 50s and 60s rock'n'roll" – thinking that he would be meeting "a couple of old guys to play with on the weekends over some beers". They soon recorded For Girls Like You.

The Basics in 2005 continued to tour and play small festivals, and after releasing For Girls Like You through MGM Distribution, they departed for a national tour of Australia, which lasted for two months and took them to every Australian state and territory. Stuart Padbury, a young Melbourne sound engineer, joined them on much of this tour. On returning, the band began demonstrating songs for a new album.

=== 2006–2009: Touring and soundtracks ===
In 2006, The Basics began recording what was to become known as Stand Out/Fit In. Taking several months, it was not completed until the end of the year, despite intentions to have it released in June. Instead, they held a successful 'album preview', where each of the tracks was demonstrated in 'rough form' accompanied by a music video for each (produced by Melbourne photographic artist James Bryans). The band also talked about the origins of the songs. This event brought a lot of attention to the band for the idea's originality. They pre-released a radio single "Just Hold On" from the album. The band were invited to play the hugely popular Homebake Festival in Sydney, where they received a great response, after being introduced onto the stage by a short stocky Asian guy with big calves ("one of the highlights" wrote The Daily Telegraph).

In 2007, the band departed on a tri-state residency which saw them play Melbourne, Sydney and Brisbane every week for the month of April – a bold move which brought further attention to the band for its original idea. Riding on the wave of this tour, Schroeder, De Backer and Heath departed on their first overseas tour which saw them performing 26 shows around Japan, Norway and the United Kingdom. They also toured twice more up the East Coast, one of which was with popular Japanese band The Bawdies. Their song "Rattle My Chain" was used in a series of commercials for Volvo Australia. The song "Hey There!" featured in the British film The Bank Job – starring Jason Statham – and was used as the backing for a February 2007 short film directed by Tim Longhurst called The Rip. Their song 'Better' was featured in a surfing documentary about the invention of the shortboard in 1967.

In 2008, the band appeared on Australia's Channel 9 for Australia Day celebrations, performing two of their songs – "Just Hold On" and "Hey There!" – to an estimated audience of 2 million. Securing an Australian Government grant, they embarked on a two-month tour of Australia, specifically targeting "culturally underprivileged groups" in rural and regional schoolchildren and Indigenous communities. The programme had them holding masterclasses and performing alongside Indigenous groups in the remote Northern Territory and Queensland. Their initiative also had them raising money for the charity Lifeline, their contribution to which was recognised with a plaque at the end of the tour. Season two of Californication starring David Duchovny featured their cover of the classic "Have Love, Will Travel", most famously covered by The Sonics.

In 2009, The Basics for the first time enjoyed the support of Australian radio network Triple J, which had reportedly snubbed the band's previous material. The singles "With This Ship" and "Like A Brother" were added to the station's playlist, and momentum carried The Basics overseas for a second tour of the United Kingdom and Norway, and also a series of shows in Dublin, Ireland. They were joined by the longtime front-of-house engineer Stuart Padbury, who had been mixing them since 2005. The band was often seen in the Grafton Street Mall in Dublin, busking to promote their concerts there. Their second show in Oslo, Norway, saw the band perform with Hot Tub, one of the members of the Norwegian boy band "Boyzvoice", in his first performance for several years. Season Eight of Scrubs featured the song 'Lookin' Over My Shoulder'.

Despite all this promise, the band's album Keep Your Friends Close – produced and part-recorded by Peter Cobbin at London's Abbey Road Studios – though enjoying many favourable reviews, failed to impress Richard Kingsmill, music director of Triple J. This effectively ended the band's apparent upward spiral and the resulting album launch tour was reportedly "trying".

=== 2010: live album ===
In 2010, following the band's fourth stint at the Tamworth Country Music Festival, and the recording of a yet-unreleased live album, an indefinite hiatus was announced on the band's websites. This was in part due to the impending release of a new album produced by De Backer for his Gotye project, and also to reported tensions within the band following the previous year's disappointments.

However, this hiatus was soon broken with a two-month residency at the Northcote Social Club in Melbourne, which saw an apparent return to form. The band's EP "Wait For You" enjoys airplay on Triple J. The Basics also played a one-off show at Sydney's Oxford Art Factory.

On 20 August 2010, The Basics released their fourth LP /ðəˈbæzɪtʃ/, available free and exclusively from their website for digital download. The band had reportedly moved to expand their listenership through this free giveaway, though 300 "Deluxe" CD/vinyl versions have been printed. /ðəˈbæzɪtʃ/ was recorded at the Northcote Social Club on 6 February, "in front of a live studio audience", and like the previous record, was mixed by Peter Cobbin at Abbey Road Studios. Technically a self-titled album, the phonetics spell out the accurate pronunciation of the band's name. Kris Schroeder: "For years we've worked at bringing our live energy into the studio and thus far it's been a bit hit-and-miss. Our trick this time was to pull a switcheroo and bring the studio to us instead; the result is the best and closest to us we've sounded yet."

Melbourne thespian and Dog With Wheels bassist David Bramble – friends with Heath from university days – has occasionally joined the band on tour, playing keys, often while sporting a large moustache. Other guests have included Jake Mason (saxophone), also of Cookin' on 3 Burners and The Bamboos, Gideon Brazil (saxophone, flute), Simon Imrei (guitar and vocals) and Monty MacKenzie (saxophone).

Covers have often made an appearance from various sources: to date, some of the bands covered have been AC/DC, Cream, The Kinks, The Rolling Stones, The Police, Neil Young, Bob Dylan, New Kids on the Block, Richard Berry, Sonny Curtis and The Crickets, JJ Cale, Harry Nilsson, Bill Scott, Ryan Adams and The Coasters (via The Beatles for their cover of Three Cool Cats).

=== 2010–2016: Hiatus and resumption ===
The band took a three-year hiatus, with an announced return to the stage together in late 2013. De Backer embarked on his solo act as Gotye with the release of the album Making Mirrors in August 2011. Tim Heath toured and recorded with Blood Red Bird. And Kris Schroeder recorded a solo EP titled, Patience in the Face of Control, before leaving Australia to work with the Red Cross in Kenya for a two-year sabbatical, during which he contracted Malaria.

On 9 November 2012, the 'best of' album Ingredients was released into stores and digitally. Leftovers, a record full of 38 unreleased tracks, was released 22 February 2013, via a limited-edition 500 copy vinyl package. A one-off gig was performed on 24 October 2012 at the Northcote Social Club to launch Ingredients and Leftovers, however without the presence of De Backer (though he did make a brief appearance and performance of "Just Hold On" via Skype from New York).

The Basics announced an Australian tour starting September 2013 following the release of a new music video for Leftovers track "So Hard For You".

Put on sale 6 December 2013, a CD/DVD live album + digital download My Brain's Off (And I Like It) was the first post-hiatus release. The live album was filmed on location at the Northcote Social Club and edited by Ryan Gaskett under close supervision by the band.

Between March and April 2014, the band recorded new music at the famed Abbey Road Studios in London. This new music was released in the form of an EP entitled "The Lucky Country", which was released on 7 November 2014. The title track was released as the lead single in partnership with the progressive social justice movement "GetUp!" and was premiered by Richard Kingsmill on triple j. Another track "Tunaomba Saidia" was also released with an accompanying video clip filmed in Nairobi and Machakos Town in Kenya, where Schroeder had spent nearly 3 years working for the Kenya Red Cross Society.

The band toured extensively across Australia in support of the EP release, featuring shows at the Corner Hotel in Melbourne and the Newtown Social Club in Sydney.

On 14 August 2015, The Basics released their 4th studio LP The Age of Entitlement, recorded at the same time as The Lucky Country EP in London. The album proved to be critically successful, being described as "important and incredible" by Stack and "never less than gripping" by Rolling Stone magazine. Australian digital radio station Double J gave it "Album of the Week". Singles from the album include "Roundabout" and "A Coward's Prayer". The band toured the album extensively throughout October/November 2015, featuring critically acclaimed shows at all capital cities around Australia, including Elsewhere Festival, Melbourne Festival, the Triffid in Brisbane and the Railway Club in Darwin.

The band performed at Dawes Point for the City of Sydney's New Year's Eve 2015/2016 and a follow-up hometown show in Melbourne at the Northcote Social Club on 2 January 2016.

=== 2017–present: In the Rude!, B.A.S.I.C., The Songroom and new material ===
The band released a new live album titled In the Rude! on 21 May 2017 to commemorate their 15-year anniversary. It contains a selection of tracks from their performance at The Howler in Brunswick, Melbourne, on 29 December 2016.

On 22 November 2019, the fifth studio album from the band titled B.A.S.I.C. was released, on limited edition CD, vinyl record and cassette tape formats.

Drawn from their award-winning TV series The Songroom, the band released an album of material from Season 2 Episode 9 which featured Wally performing under his Gotye moniker. Released on 3 July 2020 and also featuring West Australian artist Monty Cotton, the version of "Somebody That I Used To Know" performed by the group has gone on to be their most-heard track on streaming services, and hailed by fans as even surpassing the mastery of the initial track, particularly because of De Backer's emotion-laden vocals. The album is also available on the band's Bandcamp site in its entire near-two hours under the name "A Toot and A Scream in '16", a nod to the 1974 bootleg featuring John Lennon and Paul McCartney.

On 8 May 2025, the band released "Законопослушный гражданин (Don't Be Deceived)", the first song written and recorded in Russian by a Western act. Despite some initial criticism by some who protested the use of Russian language in the context of the ongoing war in Ukraine, the song was later celebrated as a tribute to the legacy of anti-corruption campaigner Alexei Navalny who lost his life under the regime of Vladimir Putin.

== Members ==
Current

- Wally De Backer – drums, vocals (2002–present)
- Kris Schroeder – bass, vocals (2002–present)
- Tim Heath – guitar, vocals (2004–present)

Former

- Michael Hubbard – guitar, vocals (2002–2004)

== Discography ==
=== Studio albums ===
List of studio albums, with selected chart positions
Title	Album details	Peak chart positions
Title	Album details	AUS
Get Back	Released: March 2003; Label: The Basics; Format: CD	—
Stand Out/Fit In	Released: May 2007; Label: The Three Basics (3B0024056); Format: CD	—
Keep Your Friends Close	Released: September 2009; Label: The Three Basics (3B0037292); Format: CD, digital	—
The Age of Entitlement	Released: August 2015; Label: The Three Basics (3B115136); Format: CD, LP, digital	60
B.A.S.I.C. / Faxing Zimbabwe	Released: November 2019; Label: The Three Basics (3B0170562); Format: CD, LP, CS, digital	66

=== Live albums ===
List of live albums, with selected details
Title	Album details
/ðəˈbæzɪtʃ/	Released: August 2010; Label: The Three Basics (3B0050758); Format: CD, 2×LP, digital; Note: Recorded at the Northcote Social Club on 6 February 2010.
My Brain's Off (And I Like It)	Released: August 2010; Label: The Three Basics (3B0098675); Format: CD+DVD, digital; Note: Recorded at the Northcote Social Club on 27 September 2013.
In the Rude!	Released: May 2017; Label: The Three Basics (3B133017); Format: CD, digital; Note: Recorded at Howler, Brunswick on 29 December 2016.
This Machine Makes Coffee	Released: April 2020; Label: The Three Basics; Format: CD; Note: Recorded at Corner Hotel, Richmond, on 29 September 2013.
A Toot and a Scream in '16 (with Gotye and Monty Cotton)	Released: April 2020; Label: The Three Basics; Format: digital, LP (November 2025); Note: Recorded at Northcote Social Club on the 28 December, 2016.

=== Compilations ===
List of compilations, with selected details
Title	Album details
Ingredients	Released: November 2012; Label: The Three Basics (380078400); Format: CD, digital
Leftovers	Released: February 2013; Label: The Three Basics (3B0082360 / 3B0094660); Format: 2×CD, LP, digital
The Path to Entitlement	Released: June 2019; Label: The Three Basics; Format: digital

=== EPs ===
List of EPs, with selected details
Title	Album details
Rock 'n' Roll	Released: 2002; Label: The Basics; Format: CD
Get Back	Released: 2003; Label: The Basics; Format: CD
For Girls Like You	Released: July 2005; Label: The Basics; Format: CD
Like a Brother	Released: June 2009; Label: The Basics (3B0036172); Format: CD
Wait for You	Released: May 2010; Label: The Basics (3B0047116); Format: CD, digital
The Lucky Country	Released: November 2014; Label: The Basics (3B0108824); Format: CD, digital
Shouldacouldawoulda	Released: March 2020; Label: The Basics; Format: digital
