= Gotye discography =

Cataloguing of published recordings by Gotye

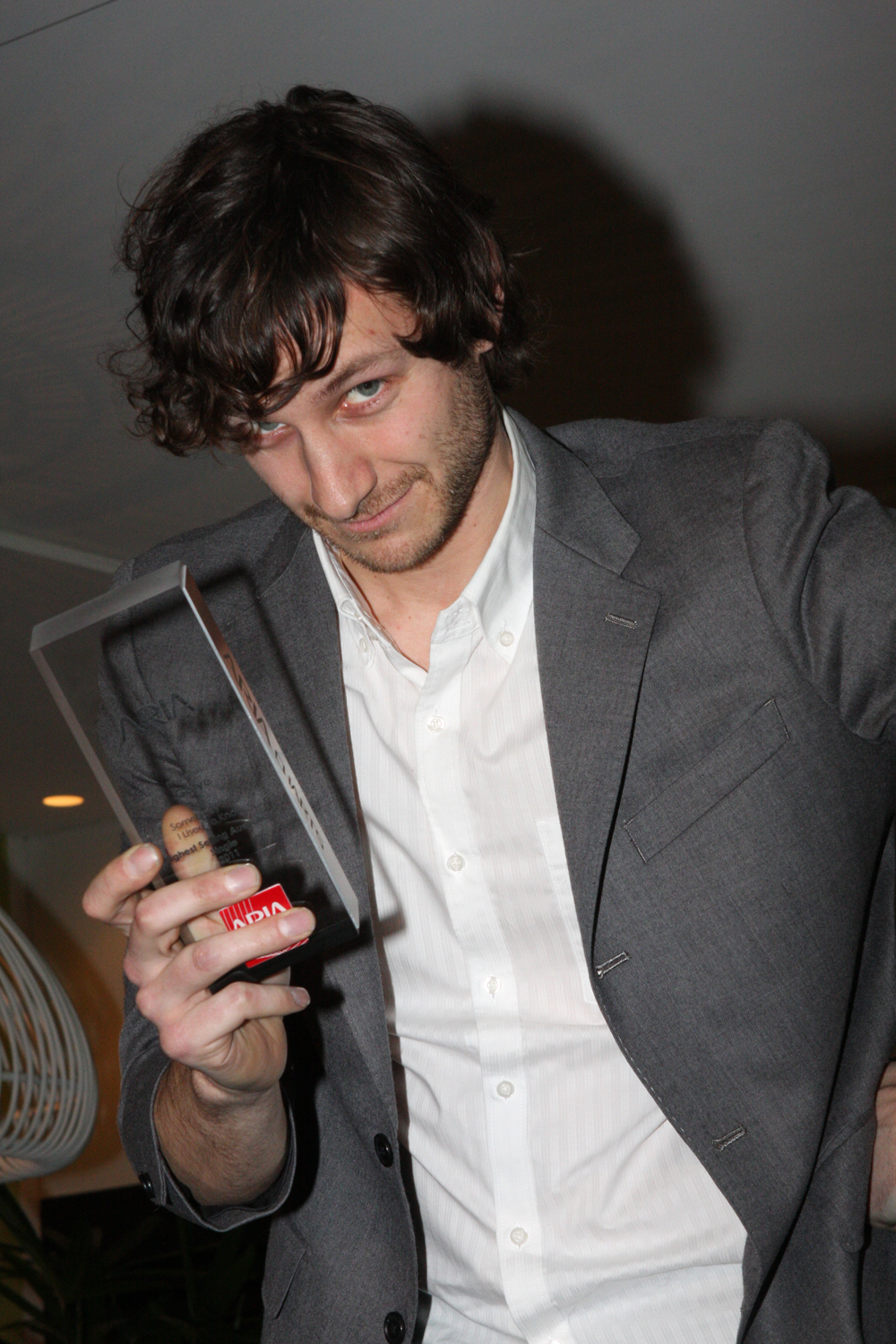
- Gotye receiving his ARIA #1 award in 2012
- Studio albums: 3
- Live albums: 1
- Singles: 12
- Music videos: 20
- Other albums: 3

Belgian-Australian singer Gotye has released three studio albums, one remix album, one live album, one collaborative album, one video album, twelve singles, and at least twenty music videos. Having developed a passion for music in his childhood years, he began his musical career as the lead singer of Australian rock band Downstares. Following the group's dissolution, Gotye turned his interest to creating sample-based electronic music; he sent out demo tapes of his music to several Australian radio stations. In 2002, he formed the indie pop band The Basics with fellow singer-songwriter Kris Schroeder. Gotye later signed to Creative Vibes as a solo artist and released his debut studio album Boardface in February 2003.

Like Drawing Blood, Gotye's second studio album, was released in May 2006. It peaked at number 13 in Australia and was certified platinum by the Australian Recording Industry Association (ARIA). Like Drawing Blood was nominated by radio station Triple J for its annual J Award and produced the singles "Learnalilgivinanlovin" and "Hearts a Mess", which charted in Australia and the Belgian region of Flanders. Mixed Blood, an album containing remixes and cover versions of Gotye's material, was released in June 2007; it peaked at number 64 in Australia.

Gotye released his third studio album Making Mirrors in August 2011; it was preceded by the releases of its first two singles, "Eyes Wide Open" and "Somebody That I Used to Know". The latter became an international hit and topped the charts in thirty-one countries, including Australia, the United Kingdom and the United States. The single also topped American chart provider Billboard's 2012 year-end Hot 100 chart. Fueled by the success of "Somebody That I Used to Know", Making Mirrors topped the charts in Australia and reached the top ten in several other countries. An additional four singles were released from the album: "I Feel Better", "Easy Way Out", "Save Me" and "State of the Art".

== Albums ==
=== Studio albums ===
List of studio albums as lead artist, with selected chart positions, sales figures and certifications
Title	Details	Peak chart positions										Sales	Certifications
Title	Details	AUS	AUT	BEL (FL)	CAN	FRA	GER	IRL	NZ	UK	US	Sales	Certifications
Boardface	Released: 15 February 2003; Label: Creative Vibes; Format: CD	93	—	—	—	—	—	—	—	—	—		
Like Drawing Blood	Released: 21 May 2006; Label: Creative Vibes; Formats: CD, LP, digital download	13	—	—	—	—	—	—	—	117	—		ARIA: Platinum
Making Mirrors	Released: 19 August 2011; Label: Eleven; Formats: CD, LP, digital download	1	6	3	5	4	3	7	8	4	6	AUS: 210,000 (Note: Sales as of April 2012); US: 662,000 (Note: Sales as of October 2012)	ARIA: 4× Platinum; BPI: Gold; BRMA: Platinum; BVMI: Platinum; IFPI AUT: Gold; MC: Gold; RIAA: 2× Platinum; RMNZ: 2× Platinum; SNEP: Platinum
"—" denotes a recording that did not chart or was not released in that territory.

==== Collaborative albums ====
Title	Details
Pulling the Stitching Out (Les Campbell featuring Gotye)	Released: 2 March 2018; Label: Xcon Records; Formats: Digital download, streamed audio

=== Remix albums ===
List of remix albums, with selected chart positions
Title	Details	Peak chart positions
Title	Details	AUS
Mixed Blood	Released: 30 June 2007; Label: Creative Vibes; Formats: CD, digital download	64

=== Live albums ===
Title	Details	Featured artists
Live at The Songroom (Season 2, Episode 9)	Released: 3 July 2020; Label: The Three Basics; Formats: Digital download, streamed audio	The Basics, Monty Cotton

=== Video albums ===
Title	Details
Video Mirrors (companion album to Making Mirrors)	Released: 2013; Label: Samples 'n' Seconds; Formats: Digital download

== Singles ==
List of singles, with selected chart positions and certifications, showing year released and album name
Title	Year	Peak chart positions										Certifications	Album
Title	Year	AUS	AUT	BEL (FL)	CAN	FRA	GER	IRL	NZ	UK	US	Certifications	Album
"Learnalilgivinanlovin"	2006	—	—	— (Note: "Learnalilgivinanlovin" did not enter the Flanders Ultratop 50, but peaked at number ten on the Ultratip chart.)	—	—	—	—	—	—	—		Like Drawing Blood
"Hearts a Mess"	2007	82	—	— (Note: "Hearts a Mess" did not enter the Flanders Ultratop 50, but peaked at number three on the Ultratip chart.)	—	—	—	—	—	—	—		Like Drawing Blood
"Coming Back"	2008	—	—	— (Note: "Coming Back" did not enter the Flanders Ultratop 50, but peaked at number eighteen on the Ultratip chart.)	—	—	—	—	—	—	—		Like Drawing Blood
"Eyes Wide Open"	2010	55	—	33	—	—	—	—	—	— (Note: "Eyes Wide Open" did not enter the UK Singles Chart, but peaked at number 78 on the UK Streaming Chart.)	96	ARIA: Platinum	Making Mirrors
"Somebody That I Used to Know" (featuring Kimbra)	2011	1	1	1	1	1	1	1	1	1	1	ARIA: 26× Platinum; BPI: 5× Platinum; BRMA: 4× Platinum; BVMI: 4× Platinum; IFPI AUT: 2× Platinum; RIAA: 17× Platinum; RMNZ: 8× Platinum	Making Mirrors
"I Feel Better"	2011	—	—	— (Note: "I Feel Better" did not enter the Flanders Ultratop 50, but peaked at number two on the Ultratip chart.)	—	—	—	—	—	—	—		Making Mirrors
"Easy Way Out"	2012	—	—	—	—	—	—	—	—	— (Note: "Easy Way Out" did not enter the UK Singles Chart, but peaked at number 83 on the UK Physical Singles Chart Top 100.)	—		Making Mirrors
"Save Me"	2012	—	—	— (Note: "Save Me" did not enter the Flanders Ultratop 50, but peaked at number seven on the Ultratip chart.)	—	—	—	—	—	—	—		Making Mirrors
"State of the Art"	2013	—	—	—	—	—	—	—	—	—	—		Making Mirrors
"Ghosts" (with Yum Cha Sessions)	2013	—	—	—	—	—	—	—	—	—	—		Non-album singles
"Quasimodo's Dream" (with Perfect Tripod)	2013	—	—	—	—	—	—	—	—	—	—		Non-album singles
"Somebody (2024)" (with Fisher and Chris Lake featuring Sante Sansone and Kimbra)	2024	— (Note: "Somebody (2024)" did not enter the Australian ARIA Singles Chart but peaked at number nine on the ARIA Australian Artists Chart.)	—	—	—	—	—	—	— (Note: "Somebody (2024)" did not enter the NZ Top 40 Singles Chart, but peaked at number 15 on the NZ Hot 40 Singles Chart.)	—	—	ARIA: Platinum; BRMA: Gold; RMNZ: Gold	Non-album singles
"—" denotes a recording that did not chart or was not released in that territory.

== Other appearances ==
List of guest appearances, showing year released and album name
Title	Year	Album
"Only the Pain Will Set You Free (Gotye's Pain Free Remix)" (Don Meers)	2001	Train Noise / Track Works
"Just Can't Get Enough (Mothloop Mix)" (Gotye; originally by Depeche Mode)	2004	Re-Fashioned Vol. 2: British Airwaves
"Surrender" (Gotye with faTT deX)	2006	Re-Fashioned 007: The James Bond Themes Go Under Cover
"Hotel Home" (Spender featuring Gotye)	2013	Modern Pest EP
"The Way You Talk" (Bibio featuring Gotye)	2016	A Mineral Love
"Heart's a Mess" (R.T.P. Da Dream featuring Gotye)	2016	M.V.P. Champion King Dream
"The Outfield" (The Night Game featuring Gotye)	2017	The Night Game
"All or Nothing" (Jackmann with Wally De Backer)	2020	Whatever Doesn't Kill You, Just Makes You Bored EP
"Anxiety (Medieval Version)" (as Walter de Backer with Luiz Bonfá, Jaylah Ji'mya Hickmon, and Bardcore)	2025	Non-album single

== Unreleased songs ==
Title	Year
"Atmosphere" (as Wally De Backer)	1995
"1-900" (among Downstares)	c. 1998
"The Better of Me"	c. 2002
"Good Times 'n' Easy Feelings"	c. 2002

== Music videos ==
List of music videos, showing year released and directors
Title	Year	Director(s)
"Out Here in the Cold"	2003	Jacob Simkin
"The Only Thing I Know"	2007	Jacob Simkin
"Night Drive"	2007	Jacob Simkin
"The Only Way"	2007	Jacob Simkin
"Thanks for Your Time"	2007	Lucy Dyson
"Hearts a Mess"	2007	Brendan Cook
"Learnalilgivinanlovin"	2007	Shannon Cross
"Coming Back"	2007	Renata Bliss
"Eyes Wide Open"	2010	Brendan Cook
"Somebody That I Used to Know" (featuring Kimbra)	2011	Natasha Pincus
"Don't Worry, We'll Be Watching You"	2011	Greg Sharp, Ivan Dixon
"State of the Art"	2011	Greg Sharp, Ivan Dixon
"Bronte"	2011	Ari Gibson
"Easy Way Out"	2012	Darcy Prendergast
"In Your Light"	2012	KOALA MAGIC
"Save Me"	2012	Peter Lowey
"Giving Me a Chance"	2012	Gina Thorstensen, Nacho Rodriguez
"Dig Your Own Hole"	2012	Saiman Chow
"Seven Hours with a Backseat Driver"	2012	Greg Sharp, Ivan Dixon
"What Do You Want?"	2012	Lucinda Schreiber
"Sometimes It Snows in April" (a cappella)	2016	—N/a
"Somebody That I Used to Know" (live) (featuring The Basics and Monty Cotton)	2020	Ryan Gaskett
"Long As I Can See the Light" (live) (with The Basics)	2020	Ryan Gaskett
"So Hard For You" (live) (with The Basics)	2020	Ryan Gaskett
"Hearts a Mess" (live) (featuring The Basics and Monty Cotton)	2020	Ryan Gaskett
"Just Hold On" (a cappella)	2020	—N/a
"Lookin' Over My Shoulder" (remastered) (with The Basics)	2020	Campbell Hynam-Smith
