= The Great Gatsby: Music from Baz Luhrmann's Film =

2013 soundtrack album by various artists

Soundtrack album by various artists
- Released: May 6, 2013
- Recorded: 2012–13
- Genres: Jazz; hip hop; baroque pop; alternative rock
- Length: 56:56
- Label: Interscope
- Producers: Baz Luhrmann; Anton Monsted

Singles from The Great Gatsby: Music from Baz Luhrmann's Film
- 1. "Young and Beautiful" Released: April 23, 2013; 2. "A Little Party Never Killed Nobody (All We Got)" Released: May 17, 2013; 3. "Bang Bang" Released: June 26, 2013

The Great Gatsby: Music from Baz Luhrmann's Film (also known as Music from Baz Luhrmann's Film The Great Gatsby) is the soundtrack album to the 2013 film The Great Gatsby, an adaptation of F. Scott Fitzgerald's 1925 novel of the same name. Interscope Records released it on May 6, 2013. The album was produced by Baz Luhrmann and Anton Monsted, with Jay-Z serving as the album's executive producer. The soundtrack comprises fourteen songs, including new material and cover versions performed by various artists. It contains a mixture of genre, including hip hop, jazz, and alternative music. Luhrmann specifically selected these styles of music to better immerse the audience into the story of The Great Gatsby.

The album received a mixed response, with the selection of songs and singers dividing critics. It peaked at number one on the U.S. Billboard 200 chart and appeared on several national record charts. The album has received three gold certifications from the Australian Recording Industry Association, the Polish Society of the Phonographic Industry, and the Recording Industry Association of America. The album spawned three singles: "Young and Beautiful", "A Little Party Never Killed Nobody (All We Got)", and "Bang Bang".

== Background ==
Jay-Z served as an executive producer for both the album and the film. The album's artwork features a small circular icon with "JZ" inside it, directly below the album's title. He worked with film director Baz Luhrmann for two years to transform the Jazz Age theme of F. Scott Fitzgerald's novel into the musical equivalents of blended hip-hop, traditional jazz and other contemporary genres. On his approach to the project, Luhrmann said: "The question for me in approaching Gatsby was how to elicit from our audience the same level of excitement and pop cultural immediacy toward the world that Fitzgerald did for his audience? And in our age, the energy of jazz is caught in the energy of hip-hop." Luhrmann also stated that Jeymes Samuel was one of the individuals he worked with on the soundtrack. He served as the film's executive music consultant. He further described his collaborations with the producers of the album during an interview with MTV saying, "[Jeymes is] a really great friend of [Jay's] and just a unique human being. He defines energy; he defines spirit and he's a pop cultural genius. And I worked with Anton Monsted ... a great little team." The duo also worked with composer Craig Armstrong, who scored Luhrmann's films Romeo + Juliet (1996) and Moulin Rouge! (2001), and executive music supervisor Anton Monsted.

== Production ==
The soundtrack contains both new music and cover versions. Fergie, Lana Del Rey, Florence and the Machine, Jay-Z, the xx, and will.i.am contributed original songs. Covers include Amy Winehouse's "Back to Black" by Beyoncé and André 3000, Roxy Music's "Love Is the Drug" by Bryan Ferry with the Bryan Ferry Orchestra, Beyoncé's "Crazy in Love" by Emeli Sandé and the Bryan Ferry Orchestra, and U2's "Love Is Blindness" by Jack White. Del Rey said of her experience contributing to the project: "It was an honor to work with Baz Luhrmann on his amazing adaptation of one of the most extraordinary books ever written. The movie is highly glamorous and exciting; Rick Nowels and I were thrilled to write the song for the film."

On April 2, 2013, Amy Winehouse's father used his Twitter profile to claim that Beyoncé had not informed him of her plans to cover "Back to Black" and that he wanted income from the song to go to his Amy Winehouse Foundation. He wrote, "I don't know this but what if Beyoncé gave £100,000 to foundation. Do you know how many kids that would help? Just putting it out there." He later added, "Let me repeat. This is the first I have heard of Beyoncé doing Amy's song." Kia Makarechi of The Huffington Post noted that Beyoncé did not use the song on a personal record so it was "slightly curious" for Winehouse to ask her for a donation. Winehouse later used his Twitter account to write: "I like Beyoncé's cover and have no probs." However, upon hearing the full-length track, he wrote on his Twitter profile, "I just heard the André part of 'Back to Black'. Terrible. He should have let Beyoncé do it all."

== Music and lyrics ==
While we acknowledge, as Fitzgerald phrased it, ‘the Jazz Age,’ and this is the period represented on screen, we — our audience — are living in ‘the Hip-Hop Age’ and want our viewers to feel the impact of modern-day music the way Fitzgerald did for the readers of his novel at the time of its publication.

— Baz Luhrmann on the music's theme

The Daily Telegraph described the film's music as a "decidedly modern mix of 21st century rap, rock and pop". Jody Rosen of Rolling Stone commented that the album's songs have "a consistent mood of noirish, doomed romance". Several songs feature influences from electronic music which was also present on the soundtrack for Luhrmann's Romeo + Juliet. Other musical elements featured on the album include electronica, hip-hop, and rock music with jazz-age sounds. Kathy McCabe of Australia's The Daily Telegraph noted the inclusion of "orchestral flourishes" in most of the songs. Instrumentally, horn-driven sounds with loping bass beats and house music synths are used in the songs.

The songs' themes include partying, murder, and heartache help to drive "the story's point home – illusionary love, the excess of the leisure classes, [and] the curse of money" as noted by Cristina Jaleru of the Associated Press. Entertainment Weekly's Adam Carlson concluded that the soundtrack's songs reflected that it is set nearly a century in the past. He noted that it contains "all honking brass and a preference for tempos that slide up the scale like liquor, getting hot just as they hit the chorus". Logan Smithson of the webzine PopMatters commented that an important function of a soundtrack is, "[...] to maintain a cohesive sound: a general theme to piece the tracks together and make it sound like a single piece of work rather than a collection of songs." He felt that the soundtrack accomplished this feat although the artists come from a mixture of genres and backgrounds. He further noted, "The Great Gatsby Soundtrack does its job of capturing the sound of the Roaring '20s. A fusion of horns brings the era to life with a modern twist. Jazzy melodies are captured by the Bryan Ferry Orchestra. Some songs certainly have a neo-soul vibe going, reminiscent of the late Amy Winehouse."

== Songs ==
The opening song, "$100 Bill" by Jay-Z contains a chopped and screwed beat and electro-rap elements, and is written from the perspective of a modern-day Gatsby. It begins with a speech by Leonardo DiCaprio, while throughout the song Jay-Z is backed by samples of a children's choir and a '20s jazz horn. In the song, he raps about being remembered, the pitfalls of wealth, as well as comparing rich people from the 1920s and the 21st century. "Back to Black", written by Mark Ronson and Amy Winehouse, originally appeared on her 2006 album of the same name. It was the last song added to the album after Jay-Z's suggestion to Luhrmann that it be included to add a darker moment to the album. It is a slower version than the original with chopped-and-screwed elements, a dark and haunting sound, using guitar, moody synth and electro bleeps to provide the instrumentation. "Bang Bang" performed by will.i.am contains a sample of the jazz composition "Charleston" (1923) and features Louis Armstrong-inspired vocals along with hi-NRG, EDM, electropop and. hip-hop elements, and 1920s-style dance music as well as the use of a ukulele. "A Little Party Never Killed Nobody (All We Got)" is a swing, hip-hop, and dubstep song which references the novel's viewing parties held by Gatsby.

"Young and Beautiful" was written by Del Rey and Rick Nowels. Musically, it is a lush ballad which contains Del Rey's sweeping vocals accompanied by dreamy strings and canned percussion. Lyrically, the song is written from the perspective of Daisy Buchanan, Gatsby's lover, and it talks about being young forever, going to parties, nostalgia, and vulnerability as shown in the lyrics "Will you still love me when I'm no longer young and beautiful?". "Love Is the Drug" originally appeared on Roxy Music's 1975 album Siren; the song was written by band members Ferry and Andy Mackay. It contains jazz elements, trumpet wails, and skittering drums as well as honky-tonk, bass sax, sleazy strings, and vocal "oohs". "Over the Love" performed by Florence and the Machine is written from the perspective of Daisy Buchanan. It contains references to the yellow dress she wears and the green light that hovers outside her home on the dock in East Egg; both were inspired by the novel. Instrumentally, it uses a light piano and Welch's "trademark heart-wrenching wail". "Where the Wind Blows" contains soul vocals performed by Coco O and contains an old-time piano sampling with a whirring drum 'n bass circular beat and jazzy keys. R. Kurt Osenlund of Slant Magazine commented that the song has the "instrumentals of a Cole Porter classic, but vocals akin to those of Jennifer Hudson". Jim Farber of New York's Daily News noted that she sings with the doll-like vocals of Betty Boop.

"Crazy in Love", credited to Beyoncé, Shawn Carter (Jay-Z), Rich Harrison, and Eugene Record, originally appeared on her 2003 album Dangerously in Love. It was chosen for inclusion on the album as it reminded the Luhrmann of a character from the novel and it was a blend of modern and traditional music complete with a jazz band and Sandé's vocals. The version included on the album is a swing and soul mash-up. The song "Together" by the xx contains skeletal electro-pop elements and a slow atmosphere, as well as a dark and insistent backing, metronomic beat, and breathy, deep vocals which climax with an orchestral swell. Thomas Corner of the Chicago Sun-Times, notes that "[it] evokes the narrative's palpable desperation in its hushed tone and nagging heart-monitor beat." "Hearts a Mess" first appeared on Gotye's second studio album, Like Drawing Blood (2006). It is a "neo-lounge ballad" "with the same clunking, treated backbone used in Gotye's song 'Somebody That I Used to Know'". Lucy Jones of NME notes it is instrumentally complete with "strings, martial beats", horns and Wouter "Wally" De Backer's vocals". According to Philip Cosores of Paste magazine, three of Gotye's vocal styles are featured in the song, "the hushed and earnest songwriter, the Sting-esque frontman with remarkable range to handle the chorus, and then the human and battered character of the song's latter moments".

"Love Is Blindness" was originally written by Bono with music by U2 and appeared on the band's 1991 album Achtung Baby. The rock-hip-hop version on this album contains drum beats, "piercing yelps...and a gut-poking bass line". "Into the Past" is a slow-tempo song performed by Nero and contains dubstep elements and strings. "Kill and Run", which contains electronica elements and is performed by Sia, was compared with Adele's songs, most notably with "Skyfall" because of its lush and languid sound, backed by strings, and because "[it] slowly builds to a crescendo that hits all the right emotional notes without becoming overwrought". "No Church in the Wild", which was originally included on Watch the Throne (2011), appears on the deluxe edition of the album. It features vocals by Kanye West and includes techno-rap elements.

== Release and promotion ==
On April 4, 2013, Interscope and Warner Brothers announced the album's track listing. The same day, a new trailer for the film featured previews of three songs from the soundtrack: "Back to Black", "Over the Love", and "Young and Beautiful". One MTV contributor wrote that the trailer spotlights the relationship between two of the film's characters, "but it's really only here to show off the movie's soundtrack". A six-minute sampler of the soundtrack, which contained snippets of the songs, excluding "Back to Black" and "100$ Bill", was released on April 16, 2013, on YouTube. The whole album was made available for streaming through NPR on May 2, 2013. It was released through Interscope Records on May 6, 2013.

Beyoncé and André 3000's cover of "Back to Black" was premiered by Mark Ronson on his East Village Radio show on April 26, 2013. Sia's "Kill and Run" also appeared online a few days later. Emeli Sandé's cover of "Crazy in Love" was premiered online on April 30, 2013, through SoundCloud. On May 2, 2013, will.i.am performed his song "Bang Bang" on the twelfth season of American Idol to promote the film, while the final four contestants covered Sandé's version of "Crazy in Love".

Pre-orders for digital distribution of the album began on April 23. Digital and physical copies of the 14-track album were available beginning May 7 at various retailers, including Starbucks in the United States and Canada; a 17-track deluxe edition was available exclusively at Target stores and available digitally through iTunes. Third Man Records released the vinyl deluxe edition of the soundtrack as well as 7" single releases of several songs. The double LP deluxe version of the album is on "metalized" vinyl where the first disc is platinum, the second is golden; they are packaged in laser-cut birch record jackets "riveted to aluminum spines". The materials were chosen to "showcase the Art Deco-meets-modern style, classic meets cutting edge, which is the essence of The Great Gatsby film". Pre-sale of the album began on May 10 through the label's website, and 100 copies were released at Third Man's Nashville shop the same day. The song premiered on SoundCloud on April 22, 2013.

On April 23, 2013, "Young and Beautiful" by Lana Del Rey was released and served as the lead single for the soundtrack. The single received positive reviews from critics. The single received a Platinum certificate from the Recording Industry Association of America for selling more than one million units in the United States. The single received another Platinum certificate from Music Canada for selling more than 80,000 units in the country. The single received a 4× Platinum certificate from the Australian Recording Industry Association for selling more than 280,000 units in Australia. The single received a 2× Platinum certificate from the Federation of the Italian Music Industry for selling more than 60,000 units in Italy. On May 6, 2013, "A Little Party Never Killed Nobody (All We Got)" by Fergie, Q-Tip and GoonRock was released and is the second single to be released from the soundtrack. The single served at number 77 on the Billboard Hot 100, and number 12 on the Hot Dance/Electronic Songs chart from Billboard. The single received its only number one spot on the Ultratip Wallonia chart in Belgium. The single received a Gold certificate from the Recording Industry Association of America for selling more than 500,000 units in the United States. The Swedish Recording Industry Association also gave the album a Platinum certificate for selling more than 40,000 units in Sweden. The final single to be released was "Bang Bang" by will.i.am, which was also sold independently on his third studio album #willpower. The single peaked at number twenty one on the Hot Dance/Electronic Songs from Billboard. It served at number one on the United Kingdom Singles Chart. It received a Platinum certificate from the British Phonographic Industry for selling more than 600,000 units in the United Kingdom.

== Commercial performance ==
Although it was predicted by Billboard that the album would debut at number two on the Billboard 200 chart with first week sales of over 100,000 copies, it sold 137,000 copies in its first week. 119,000 of these were digital downloads, the largest digital sales week for a soundtrack, and the album debuted at number one on the Digital Albums chart. It became the second best-selling soundtrack album of 2013 in the United States, with 538,000 copies sold for the year. In the weekly charts, the soundtrack was ranked number one on three rank categories from Billboard, including alternative, rock and soundtrack. The soundtrack also served number one in Russia for album sales. A year after the soundtrack was released, it was peaked at twenty seven on the Australia album charts, and twenty four on the Billboard 200 chart.

The soundtrack has received three certifications from different countries. In Australia, the Australian Recording Industry Association gave the album a Gold certificate for selling more than 35,000 copies in the country. In Poland, the Polish Society of the Phonographic Industry gave the album a Gold certificate for selling more than 10,000 copies in the country. In the United States, the Recording Industry Association of America gave the album a Gold certificate for selling more than 500,000 copies in the country.

== Critical reception ==
Professional ratings
Aggregate scores
Source	Rating
Metacritic	63/100
Review scores
Source	Rating
AllMusic	4/5 stars
American Songwriter	3.5/5
Consequence of Sound	3/5 stars
Paste	Positive
Pitchfork	4.0/10
PopMatters	6/10
Rolling Stone	3.5/5 stars
Slant Magazine	2/5 stars
USA Today	2.5/4 stars

The soundtrack received a generally favorable reception. Prior to the album's release, The Philadelphia Inquirer complimented Jay-Z for assembling a talented and diverse musical roster. R. Kurt Osenlud of Slant Magazine wrote that the album was "easily the most anticipated album of its kind in years" and described its sound as an "extraordinary melding of vintage and contemporary sounds". Osenlud also commented that the soundtrack was a "literate answer to the mash-up, another hip and highbrow upgrade in both sights and sounds" for the composer Craig Armstrong.

At Metacritic, which assigns a weighted mean rating out of 100 to reviews from mainstream critics, the album received an average score of 68, based on seven reviews which indicates "generally favorable reviews". AllMusic's David Jeffries gave the album a 4 out of 5 star rating. He praised the album, writing in his review, "Buying into Luhrmann's vision is always the issue, but here, the music is crafted enough, inspired enough, and deep enough that it's worth diving into without reservations. Luckily, you can wring all that disappointment and despair out of your fine, stylish suit after surfacing." Kelly Dearmore of American Songwriter gave the soundtrack a 3.5 out of 5 score, writing that the songs from the soundtrack create a resemblance of the movie's plot, adding "[...] it mirrors many aesthetic elements of the film, augments the general storyline and adds depth and personality to the characters and dialogue on the screen". Philip Cosores of Paste magazine noted that the album's songs were not related to hip-hop describing the music as "middling, neither offensive nor revolutionary, with memorable moments and forgettable ones". PopMatters' Logan Smithson gave the album a 6 out of 10 score, writing that the soundtrack avoids sticking to only one genre, stating that the different styles on the soundtrack were made in sacrifice.

While the album did receive positive reviews, there were also mixed ones. Elysa Gardner of USA Today gave the album a 3.5 out of 4 star rating, noting that the better songs on the soundtrack are the ones that do not mention the events in the film. Jim Farber of Daily News questioned why the album did not include blues, a sound as key to the ’20s as jazz. He added, "[Y]ou could accuse the modern artists of indulging in a bit of dress-up for these tracks. Even so, they hit the desired party tone, one that, even 90 years later, still has sass." Paula Mejia of Consequence of Sound gave the album a 3 out of 5 star rating, saying in her review that the soundtrack is like a sampler album that people from the Grammys give out to people like her who are not notable enough to attend, concluding that she is not completely satisfied with the album's content. Laura Snapes of Pitchfork gave the album a 4 out of 10 score, stating that the album's songs do not fit the theme of the movie except for "Together" and "Hearts a Mess". Thomas Corner of The Chicago Sun-Times described the album as an "anachronistic hootenanny", adding, "With nods to the roaring '20s without attempts at replicating them, most performances are restrained and pull at the various taut threads of Gatsby's unraveling." Eric Henderson of Slant Magazine gave a mixed review writing that "The Great Gatsby speaks on Duke and Ella's behalf when it says, 'It don't mean a thing.' Period".

Drew McWeeny of HitFix gave the album a negative review saying that it was "probably the weakest for any of the Luhrmann films", describing it as "a non-stop wallpaper" of guest appearances by people who are famous in the present and "none of it sticks". Katie Hasty of the same publication also gave a negative review of the album, describing it as a "vehicular manslaughter" which combines different music elements "in ways that demean all genres". She also commented that the struggle of now-ness "is pertinent to one of the soundtrack’s few achievements" and concluded "the elegance of suggestion from its better songs is disrupted by its obnoxious neighbors". Bloomberg L.P.'s Mark Beech gave the album a similarly negative review, heavily criticizing the production by Jay-Z and referring to the album as "a commercial shotgun marriage that threatens to go awry, damaging the credibility of both the movie and the brands". He did praise the track "Young and Beautiful" and said, "If it were all this good, Music From Baz Luhrmann's Film: 'The Great Gatsby' would be 4-stars. In the event, it's barely 1-star."

== Track listing ==
The Great Gatsby: Music from Baz Luhrmann's Film track listing
No.	Title	Writer(s)	Producer(s)	Length
1.	"$100 Bill" (Jay-Z)	Shawn Carter, Evan Mast	E*vax	3:20
2.	"Back to Black" (Beyoncé and André 3000)	Amy Winehouse, Mark Ronson	Hollywood Holt	3:21
3.	"Bang Bang" (will.i.am; additional vocals by Shelby Spalione)	William Adams, James P. Johnson, Cecil Mack, Sonny Bono	will.i.am	4:39
4.	"A Little Party Never Killed Nobody (All We Got)" (Fergie, Q-Tip and GoonRock)	Stacy Ferguson, David Listenbee, Kamaal Fareed, Andrea Martin, Jordan Orvash, Maureen Ann McDonald, Francesca Richard, Andre Smith, Josh Stevens, Alexander Scott	GoonRock, Orvash (co.), Richard (vocal)	4:01
5.	"Young and Beautiful" (Lana Del Rey)	Lana Del Rey, Rick Nowels	Nowels, Al Shux (add.)	3:56
6.	"Love Is the Drug" (Bryan Ferry and the Bryan Ferry Orchestra)	Ferry, Andrew MacKay	Ferry, Rhett Davies	2:41
7.	"Over the Love" (Florence + the Machine)	Florence Welch, Sbtrkt, Stuart Hammond, Kid Harpoon	Emile Haynie, Kid Harpoon, Baz Luhrmann	4:21
8.	"Where the Wind Blows" (Coco O.)	Martin, Dan Dougherty, Phil Ponce	Martin	3:50
9.	"Crazy in Love" (Emeli Sandé and the Bryan Ferry Orchestra)	Beyoncé Knowles, Shawn Carter, Eugene Record, Rich Harrison	Jon Brion	3:08
10.	"Together" (The xx)	Jamie Smith, Oliver Sim, Romy Madley Croft	Smith	5:25
11.	"Hearts a Mess" (Gotye)	Walter De Backer, Irving Burgie, William Attaway	Gotye	6:04
12.	"Love Is Blindness" (Jack White)	Paul Hewson, David Evans, Adam Clayton, Larry Mullen Jr.	White	3:18
13.	"Into the Past" (Nero)	Joseph Ray, Daniel Stephens, Alana Watson, Craig Armstrong	Stephens, Ray	5:17
14.	"Kill and Run" (Sia)	Sia Furler, Chris Braide	Braide, Oliver Kraus	3:35
Total length:				56:56

Deluxe edition track listing
No.	Title	Writer(s)	Performer(s)	Length
1.	"$100 Bill"		Jay-Z	3:20
2.	"Back to Black"		Beyoncé x André 3000	3:21
3.	"Young and Beautiful"		Lana Del Rey	3:56
4.	"Love Is Blindness"		Jack White	3:18
5.	"Crazy in Love" (Kid Koala Version)		Emeli Sandé with the Bryan Ferry Orchestra	3:08
6.	"Bang Bang"		will.i.am additional vocals by Nicole Scherzinger	4:39
7.	"I Like Large Parties" (Dialogue)		Elizabeth Debicki	0:09
8.	"A Little Party Never Killed Nobody (All We Got)"		Fergie, Q-Tip and GoonRock	4:01
9.	"Love Is the Drug"		Bryan Ferry with the Bryan Ferry Orchestra	2:41
10.	"Can't Repeat the Past?" (Dialogue)		Leonardo DiCaprio, Tobey Maguire	0:08
11.	"Hearts a Mess"		Gotye	6:04
12.	"Where the Wind Blows"		Coco O. of Quadron	3:50
13.	"Green Light"			0:07
14.	"No Church in the Wild"	Shawn Carter, Kanye West, Christopher Breaux, Charles Njapa, Michael Dean, Terius Nash, Gary Wright, Phil Manzanera, James Brown, Joseph Roach	Jay-Z, Kanye West featuring Frank Ocean, The-Dream	4:32
15.	"Over the Love"		Florence + The Machine	4:21
16.	"Together"		The xx	5:25
17.	"Into the Past"		Nero	5:17
18.	"Kill and Run"		Sia	3:35
19.	"Over the Love (Of You)"		Florence + The Machine, Sbtrkt	2:59
20.	"Young and Beautiful" (DH Orchestral Version)		Lana Del Rey	3:51
21.	"Gatsby Believed in the Green Light" (Dialogue)		Tobey Maguire, Craig Armstrong	3:52
Total length:				72:34

== Personnel ==
Credits for Music from Baz Luhrmann's Film The Great Gatsby adapted from AllMusic.

- André 3000 – primary artist
- Beyoncé – primary artist
- The Bryan Ferry Orchestra – primary artist
- Lana Del Rey – primary artist
- Fergie – primary artist
- Bryan Ferry – primary artist
- Florence and the Machine – primary artist
- GoonRock – primary artist
- Gotye – primary artist
- Jay-Z – primary artist
- Nero – primary artist
- Coco O. – primary artist
- Q-Tip – primary artist
- Emeli Sandé – primary artist
- Sia – primary artist
- Jack White – primary artist
- will.i.am – primary artist
- The xx – primary artist

== Charts ==
=== Weekly charts ===
Weekly chart performance for The Great Gatsby: Music from Baz Luhrmann's Film
Chart (2013)	Peak position
Australian Albums Chart	2
Austrian Albums Chart	10
Belgian Albums Chart (Flanders)	8
Belgian Albums Chart (Wallonia)	20
Canadian Albums Chart	3
China Album Chart	3
Croatian Albums Chart	16
Czech Albums Chart	23
Danish Albums Chart	11
Dutch Albums Chart	61
Finnish Albums Chart	48
French Albums Chart	14
German Albums Chart	13
Greek Albums Chart	5
Hungarian Albums Chart	28
Irish Compilation Albums Chart	2
Italian Compilation Albums Chart	3
New Zealand Albums Chart	3
Norwegian Albums Chart	21
Polish Albums Chart	10
Russian Albums Chart	1
South Korean Albums Chart	30
Spanish Albums Chart	22
Swiss Albums Chart	8
UK Compilation Albums Chart	3
US Billboard 200	2
US Alternative Albums	1
US Rock Albums	1
US Soundtrack Albums	1

=== Year-end charts ===
Year-end chart performance for The Great Gatsby: Music from Baz Luhrmann's Film
Chart (2013)	Position
Australian Albums Chart	27
US Billboard 200	44

== Certifications ==
Certifications for The Great Gatsby: Music from Baz Luhrmann's Film
Region	Certification	Certified units/sales
Australia (ARIA)	Platinum	70,000^{^}
Poland (ZPAV)	Gold	10,000^{*}
United Kingdom (BPI)	Gold	100,000^{*}
United States (RIAA)	Gold	610,000
^{*} Sales figures based on certification alone.^{^} Shipments figures based on certification alone.
