= Mixed blood (disambiguation) =

The term mixed-blood in the United States is most often employed for individuals of mixed European and Native American ancestry.

Mixed blood may also refer to:

- Mixed Blood (album), a 2007 remix and cover album of songs originally by Gotye
- Mixed Blood (1916 film), a 1916 film by Charles Swickard
- Mixed Blood (1984 film), a 1984 film by Paul Morrissey
- Mixed Blood Theatre Company, a professional multiracial theatre company in Minneapolis, Minnesota
