= A Little Party Never Killed Nobody (All We Got) =

Single by Fergie, Q-Tip and GoonRock

from the album The Great Gatsby: Music from Baz Luhrmann's Film
- Released: May 17, 2013
- Recorded: 2013
- Genre: Electro house; electro swing; hip hop
- Length: 4:01
- Label: Interscope
- Songwriters: David Listenbee; Stacy Ferguson; Kamaal Fareed; Andrea Martin; Jordan Orvash; Maureen McDonald; Francesca Richard; Andre Smith; Josh Stevens; Alexander Scott
- Producers: GoonRock; Orvash; Richard (vocal)

Fergie singles chronology
"Beautiful Dangerous" (2011)	"A Little Party Never Killed Nobody (All We Got)" (2013)	"L.A. Love (La La)" (2014)

Q-Tip singles chronology
"Bang Bang Bang" (2010)	"A Little Party Never Killed Nobody (All We Got)" (2013)	"Thank You" (2013)

GoonRock singles chronology
"Party Rock Anthem" (2011)	"A Little Party Never Killed Nobody (All We Got)" (2013)

Music video
- "A Little Party Never Killed Nobody (All We Got)" on YouTube

"A Little Party Never Killed Nobody (All We Got)" is a 2013 song recorded by Fergie, Q-Tip and GoonRock for the soundtrack to the 2013 film The Great Gatsby, an adaptation of F. Scott Fitzgerald's novel of the same name, released through Interscope Records on May 17, 2013.

== Background and composition ==
On April 4, 2013, Interscope and Warner Bros. announced the track listing for the Music from Baz Luhrmann's Film The Great Gatsby, which included a brand new track titled "A Little Party Never Killed Nobody (All We Got)" performed by Fergie with Q-Tip and GoonRock. Prior to the release of the album, the song premiered on Rolling Stone's official website on April 15, 2013.

"A Little Party Never Killed Nobody (All We Got)" is a swing-flavored hip hop and electro house song with lyrics about partying.

== Music video ==
The official music video was released via YouTube on August 6, 2013.

== Track listing ==
- Digital download
1. "A Little Party Never Killed Nobody (All We Got)" (Drop City Yacht Club Remix) – 4:26
- Digital download (remixes)
1. "A Little Party Never Killed Nobody (All We Got)" (Paige Festival Remix) – 6:04
2. "A Little Party Never Killed Nobody (All We Got)" (Connor Cruise + Chebacca Remix) – 3:50
3. "A Little Party Never Killed Nobody (All We Got)" (Marco Da Silva Remix) – 4:00
4. "A Little Party Never Killed Nobody (All We Got)" (Audiobot Remix) – 3:13
5. "A Little Party Never Killed Nobody (All We Got)" (Drop City Yacht Club Gangster Summer Remix) – 4:26

== Charts ==
=== Weekly charts ===
Chart (2013)	Peak position
Australia (ARIA)	43
Austria (Ö3 Austria Top 40)	17
Belgium (Ultratip Bubbling Under Flanders)	5
Belgium (Ultratop 50 Wallonia)	28
Belgium (Ultratip Bubbling Under Wallonia)	1
Canada Hot 100 (Billboard)	72
CIS Airplay (TopHit)	2
Czech Republic Airplay (ČNS IFPI)	5
France (SNEP)	27
Germany (GfK)	10
Ireland (IRMA)	89
Italy (FIMI)	78
New Zealand (Recorded Music NZ)	3
Poland Dance (ZPAV)	5
Poland (Video Chart)	5
Russia Airplay (TopHit)	1
Slovakia Airplay (ČNS IFPI)	31
Sweden (Sverigetopplistan)	14
Switzerland (Schweizer Hitparade)	49
UK Singles (Official Charts Company)	90
Ukraine Airplay (TopHit)	71
US Billboard Hot 100	77
US Hot Dance/Electronic Songs (Billboard)	12

=== Year-end charts ===
Chart (2013)	Position
Belgium (Ultratop Wallonia)	77
France (SNEP)	117
Germany (Media Control AG)	58
New Zealand (Recorded Music NZ)	34
Russia Airplay (TopHit)	18
Sweden (Sverigetopplistan)	61
Ukraine Airplay (TopHit)	196
US Hot Dance/Electronic Songs (Billboard)	30

Chart (2014)	Position
Russia Airplay (TopHit)	108

== Certifications ==
Region	Certification	Certified units/sales
Australia (ARIA)	Gold	35,000^{^}
Germany (BVMI)	Platinum	300,000^{‡}
Italy (FIMI)	Gold	25,000^{‡}
New Zealand (RMNZ)	2× Platinum	30,000^{*}
Sweden (GLF)	Platinum	40,000^{‡}
United Kingdom (BPI)	Silver	200,000^{‡}
United States (RIAA)	Platinum	1,000,000^{‡}
^{*} Sales figures based on certification alone.^{^} Shipments figures based on certification alone.^{‡} Sales+streaming figures based on certification alone.

== Release history ==
Region	Release date	Format	Label	Ref.
Italy	May 17, 2013	Contemporary hit radio	Universal	
Australia	June 14, 2013	Digital download, stream	Interscope Records	
United States	July 30, 2013	Digital download	Interscope Records	
