= I Feel Better =

I Feel Better may refer to:

- I Feel Better (film), a 2018 French comedy film
- "I Feel Better" (Gotye song), from the 2011 album Making Mirrors
- "I Feel Better" (Hot Chip song), from the 2010 album One Life Stand
- "I Feel Better", a song by John Entwistle from the 1972 album Whistle Rymes
- "I Feel Better", a song by Frightened Rabbit from the 2008 album The Midnight Organ Fight
