= Hearts a Mess =

Single by Gotye

from the album Like Drawing Blood
- Released: 2007
- Recorded: 2004–06
- Genre: Trip hop, downtempo
- Length: 3:32 (radio mix); 4:39 (music video version) 6:06 (album version)
- Label: Independent
- Songwriters: Gotye, Irving Burgie, William Attaway
- Producer: Gotye

Gotye singles chronology
"Learnalilgivinanlovin" (2006)	"Hearts a Mess" (2007)	"Eyes Wide Open" (2010)

"Hearts a Mess" is a song by the Belgian-Australian musician Gotye from his second studio album Like Drawing Blood, released as a single in 2007. The song was included on the album The Great Gatsby: Music from Baz Luhrmann's Film. The song also appears in an episode of the American television series Gossip Girl. It contains samples of "Day-O (Banana Boat Song)" by Harry Belafonte.

The Brendan Cook directed music video was nominated for Best Video at the ARIA Music Awards of 2007.

In 2018, Broods released "Eyes a Mess", a cover medley of "Hearts a Mess" and "Eyes Wide Open".

== Music video ==
A music video to accompany the release "Hearts a Mess" was first released onto YouTube on 5 December 2007 at a total length of four minutes and forty seconds.

== Track listing ==
Digital download

1. "Hearts a Mess" (radio mix) – 3:32
2. "Hearts a Mess" – 6:07
3. "Hearts a Mess" (Supermayer Mix) – 8:21
4. "Hearts a Mess" (Lull Mix) – 7:41
5. "Hearts a Mess" (Ocelot Mix) – 5:41
6. "Hearts a Mess" (Joe Hardy 3AM Mix) – 6:03

=== Hearts a Mess Remix EP ===
Digital download

1. "Hearts a Mess" – 6:05
2. "Hearts a Mess" (radio mix) – 3:32
3. "Hearts a Mess" (Supermayer Mix) – 8:21
4. "Hearts a Mess" (Lull Mix) – 7:41
5. "Hearts a Mess" (Ocelot Mix) – 5:41
6. "Hearts a Mess" (Dlake Mix) – 5:25
7. "Hearts a Mess" (Joe Hardy 3AM Mix) – 6:05
8. "Hearts a Mess" (Duosseudo Mix) – 5:21

== Chart performance ==
Chart (2007)	Peak position
Australia (ARIA)	82
Belgium (Ultratip Bubbling Under Flanders)	3

The song was voted #8 in the Triple J Hottest 100, 2006 in 2007. In 2009 the song was voted #77 in the Triple J Hottest 100 of All Time, 2009. The song also appears on the soundtrack for Baz Luhrmann's 2013 film adaptation of the classic F. Scott Fitzgerald novel The Great Gatsby. The song was also voted #12 in the Triple J Hottest 100 Past 20 Years in 2013. In 2025, the song ranked 86 on Triple J's Hottest 100 of Australian Songs.
