= Young and Beautiful (Lana Del Rey song) =

2013 single by Lana Del Rey

Single by Lana Del Rey

from the album The Great Gatsby: Music from Baz Luhrmann's Film
- Released: April 23, 2013; October 23, 2013 (Cedric Gervais remix)
- Recorded: 2012
- Studio: The Green Building (Santa Monica, CA); Hackney Downs Studio (London, England); Air Lyndhurst Studios (London, England)
- Genre: Orchestral pop; classical crossover
- Length: 4:00 (album version); 3:50 (Cedric Gervais remix); 7:05 (Cedric Gervais extended remix)
- Label: Interscope; Polydor; Water Tower
- Songwriters: Lana Del Rey; Rick Nowels
- Producers: Rick Nowels, Al Shux (original version); Dan Heath (DH orchestral version)

Lana Del Rey singles chronology
"Dark Paradise" (2013)	"Young and Beautiful" (2013)	"Once Upon a Dream" (2014)

Cedric Gervais singles chronology
"Summertime Sadness (Remix)" (2013)	"Young and Beautiful (Remix)" (2013)	"Adore You (Remix)" (2014)

Music video
- "Young and Beautiful" on YouTube
- "Young and Beautiful (Remix)" on YouTube

"Young and Beautiful" is a song by American singer and songwriter Lana Del Rey used for the soundtrack to the drama film The Great Gatsby.

Contemporary music critics lauded the single, calling it "haunting" and "somber". Lyrically, "Young and Beautiful" follows a young lover's apprehension about whether love can last. A music video, directed by Chris Sweeney and filmed by Sophie Muller, was released on May 10, 2013.

"Young and Beautiful" reached number one in the Commonwealth of Independent States as well as the top 10 in Australia, Hungary, Israel, and Italy. In May 2013, the song broke into the Billboard Hot 100; it peaked at 22 on the chart, making it Del Rey's second highest peak up to that point. Shortly after, the song also peaked at 3 on the Hot Rock Songs chart. The song is certified nine-times Platinum in Australia, six-times Platinum in the US, and Platinum or Double Platinum in seven additional countries.

Del Rey and Nowels received accolades for their songwriting from various music and film awards, including nominations for Best Song Written for Visual Media at the 56th Annual Grammy Awards, and Best Song at the 19th Critics' Choice Awards. They eventually won the Best Original Song at the 18th Satellite Awards. On January 26, 2014, "Young and Beautiful" was announced as number 7 on the annual Triple J's Hottest 100 in Australia.

== Background ==
Working with the film's director, co-writer, and co-producer Baz Luhrmann, Del Rey wrote the original song "Young and Beautiful" for the soundtrack of the 2013 film adaptation of The Great Gatsby, from the perspective of Daisy Buchanan.

In an interview with Catalunya Ràdio, Del Rey said she had three new songs for Paradise: "I Sing the Body Electric", "In the Land of Gods and Monsters" and "Will You Still Love Me When I'm No Longer Young and Beautiful." Del Rey sang the chorus of "Young and Beautiful" during the Catalunya Ràdio broadcast.

The song was released to contemporary hit radio as a single and was used as the film's kickoff single. A snippet of the track appeared in the official trailer for the film and played during the scene where the characters portrayed by Leonardo DiCaprio and Carey Mulligan express their romantic feelings for one another.

In October 2013, a remix by Cedric Gervais was commissioned for the record label Universal Germany. It was sent to Italian contemporary hit radio by Universal Music on January 10, 2014.

== Composition ==
"Young and Beautiful"
In this 30 second sample of the ballad, "Young and Beautiful", the lyrics, "Will you still love me when I'm no longer young and beautiful?" that embody the refrain can be heard.

With the lyrics "Will you still love me when I'm no longer young and beautiful?", Del Rey adds a hint of desperation which parallels the idiosyncrasies faced by the characters in F. Scott Fitzgerald's classic novel The Great Gatsby. Del Rey's dreamy vocals are draped over sedated strings and canned percussion. The soft and dreary vocals, falling in line with Del Rey's retro affectation, fits the atmosphere of the 1920s when the novel is set. The lyrics rotate around the themes of pleasing a lover, nostalgia, and the gloom of aging.

== Music video ==
The music video for "Young and Beautiful" was set to be released on April 22, 2013, but was officially released on May 10, 2013. Directed by Chris Sweeney, the video's production was helmed by Adam Smith and Jacob Swan-Hyam, with Sophie Muller shooting the footage. Flanked by a full-string orchestra, Del Rey sings Dan Heath's Orchestral version of her song in 1920s art deco fashion. She is shown singing the song in a dark room with glittery diamond-tears on her cheek which look like tattoos. Jason Lipshutz of Billboard magazine described the video as "somber" and the singer's look as "especially demure". Lipshutz concluded that "the clip ends without ever reaching any kind of conclusion -- much like the rhetorical question 'Will you still love me when I'm no longer young and beautiful?' at the heart of the song." Spin's Marc Hogan described it as "elegantly conceived, but succeed[s] only as much as the music does".

An edit of the video set to the Cedric Gervais remix was published on September 27, 2013.

== Reception and legacy ==
Critical reception of "Young and Beautiful" has been fairly positive. Hip hop magazine Rap-Up called the single "haunting", while MTV called it "somber-sounding". Jason Lipshutz of Billboard called the ballad, "typically lush", paralleling the single with Del Rey's previous hits, "Video Games" and "Born to Die". Canadian journal National Post wrote "Young and Beautiful" picks up where "Video Games" left off, stating the song was relevant to the book because of "its obsession with decay and the fleeting nature of the good life certainly resonate." The journal continued to call it an "artifact" of Del Rey's consistently dark tone, adding that by the second play-through "its bald directness becomes its appeal." MTV commented that the track "falls very much in-line with what Lana Del Rey's fans have come to expect" from Del Rey. Jeff Benjamin of Fuse said the track featured "a big, sweeping ballad with piano, violins and Lana's warbly delivery." He added that "if the single takes off, perhaps the songbird can finally scrub her image clean of that 'Girl that totally f-cked [sic] up her Saturday Night Live debut' tag." Rolling Stone's Jody Rosen recognized "Young and Beautiful" as the album's centerpiece, calling it "inert" and "a drag" despite its symmetry with the album's entire theme. Finding the track restrained in comparison to her earlier work, August Brown, writing for The Los Angeles Times, called the single "clean" and "classy". "Young and Beautiful" was given a positive review by Stereogum's Tom Breihan, although he disapproved of the vapidity of the line: "make me wanna party". Nathan Ellis, writing for Far Out Magazine, praised the track for the "silky vocals" and "dulcet tones."

The song was nominated for Best Song Written for Visual Media at the 56th Annual Grammy Awards. "Young and Beautiful" was also nominated for Best Original Song at the World Soundtrack Awards 2013. It won the Best Original Song at the 18th Satellite Awards.

== Commercial performance ==
Debuting at number 82 on the United States' Billboard Hot 100, "Young and Beautiful" instantly became Del Rey's highest-charting single up to that point. With 48,000 units in first-week sales, the song also entered the Hot Digital Songs chart at 36. The song later peaked at number 22 on the former, spending 21 weeks on the chart, and has since been certified six-times platinum by the Recording Industry Association of America denoting sales and streaming units equivalent to six million.

== Accolades ==
Year	Organization	Award	Result	Ref.
2014	Critics' Choice Movie Awards	Best Song	Nominated	
2014	Grammy Awards	Best Song Written for Visual Media	Nominated	
2014	Satellite Awards	Best Original Song	Won	

== Personnel ==
Credits adapted from the soundtrack's liner notes.

Original version

- Lana Del Rey – vocals, composition
- Rick Nowels – production, piano, keyboards, orchestration, composition
- Patrick Warren – strings, tubular bells, dulcitone, electric guitar, pump musette, piano
- Craig Armstrong – orchestral arrangement
- Perry Montague-Mason – orchestra leader
- Devrim Karaoglu – bass
- Kieron Menzies – recording, programming
- Al Shux – drum programming
- Dan Heath – orchestral drum programming
- Jon Ingoldsby – additional engineering
- Jordan Stilwell – additional engineering
- Trevor Yasuda – additional engineering
- Chris Barrett – assistant engineering
- John Prestage – assistant engineering
- Geoff Foster – orchestra recording
- Robert Orton – mixing
- David Greenaway – orchestra conductor
- Isobel Griffiths – orchestra contractor
- Charlotte Matthews – assistant orchestra contractor

"DH orchestral version"

- Lana Del Rey – vocals, composition
- Dan Heath – producer
- Rick Nowels – composition
- Kieron Menzies – vocals recording
- Songa Lee – violin
- Kathleen Sloan – violin
- Robert Orton – mixing
- Trevor Yasuda – engineering
- Chris Barrett – engineering
- John Prestage – engineering

== Charts ==
=== Weekly charts ===
==== Original version ====
Chart (2013–2014)	Peak position
Australia (ARIA)	8
Austria (Ö3 Austria Top 40)	57
Belgium (Ultratop 50 Flanders)	34
Belgium (Ultratop 50 Wallonia)	33
Canada Hot 100 (Billboard)	45
CIS Airplay (TopHit)	1
Czech Republic Singles Digital (ČNS IFPI)	44
France (SNEP)	31
Germany (GfK)	50
Greece Digital Songs (Billboard)	2
Hungary (Single Top 40)	9
Iceland (RÚV)	30
Ireland (IRMA)	16
Israel International Airplay (Media Forest)	7
Italy (FIMI)	8
Lebanon (The Official Lebanese Top 20)	16
Netherlands (Single Top 100)	79
New Zealand (Recorded Music NZ)	23
Poland Airplay (ZPAV)	12
Russia Airplay (TopHit)	1
Scottish Singles Sales (Official Charts)	21
Slovakia Airplay (ČNS IFPI)	53
Spain (Promusicae)	24
Sweden (Sverigetopplistan)	39
Switzerland (Schweizer Hitparade)	31
UK Singles (Official Charts)	23
Ukraine Airplay (TopHit)	10
US Billboard Hot 100	22
US Hot Rock & Alternative Songs (Billboard)	3
US Dance Club Songs (Billboard)	41
US Dance Airplay (Billboard)	5

Chart (2024)	Peak position
Global Excl. US (Billboard)	180

Chart (2025–2026)	Peak position
Global 200 (Billboard)	160
Greece International (IFPI)	65

==== Cedric Gervais remix ====
Chart (2014)	Peak position
New Zealand (Recorded Music NZ)	38

=== Year-end charts ===
Chart (2013)	Position
Australia (ARIA)	29
France (SNEP)	142
Russia Airplay (TopHit)	61
Ukraine Airplay (TopHit)	103
UK Singles (Official Charts Company)	196
US Alternative Digital Song Sales (Billboard)	14
US Dance/Mix Show Airplay (Billboard)	45
US Hot Rock Songs (Billboard)	21

Chart (2014)	Position
Italy (FIMI)	63
Russia Airplay (TopHit)	26
Ukraine Airplay (TopHit)	113
US Alternative Digital Song Sales (Billboard)	19
US Rock Digital Song Sales (Billboard)	41

Chart (2015)	Position
US Rock Digital Song Sales (Billboard)	50

== Certifications ==
Region	Certification	Certified units/sales
Australia (ARIA)	10× Platinum	700,000^{‡}
Austria (IFPI Austria)	Platinum	30,000^{*}
Brazil (Pro-Música Brasil)	2× Platinum	120,000^{‡}
Canada (Music Canada)	Platinum	80,000^{*}
Denmark (IFPI Danmark)	Platinum	90,000^{‡}
Germany (BVMI)	Platinum	300,000^{‡}
Italy (FIMI)	3× Platinum	300,000^{‡}
New Zealand (RMNZ)	4× Platinum	120,000^{‡}
Spain (Promusicae)	2× Platinum	120,000^{‡}
Sweden (GLF)	2× Platinum	80,000^{‡}
United Kingdom (BPI)	2× Platinum	1,200,000^{‡}
United States (RIAA)	6× Platinum	6,000,000^{‡}
Streaming
Denmark (IFPI Danmark)	Gold	900,000^{†}
Greece (IFPI Greece)	3× Platinum	6,000,000^{†}
^{*} Sales figures based on certification alone.^{‡} Sales+streaming figures based on certification alone.^{†} Streaming-only figures based on certification alone.

== Release history ==
Region	Date	Format	Label
Germany	April 22, 2013	Digital download	Polydor; Interscope
United States	April 23, 2013	Digital download	Water Tower; Interscope
Italy	April 26, 2013	Contemporary hit radio	Universal
United States	May 21, 2013	Contemporary hit radio	Interscope

== See also ==
- List of highest-certified singles in Australia
