= Mixed Blood (album) =

Remix album by Gotye
- Released: July 2007
- Recorded: 2007
- Length: 63:13
- Label: Independent; Creative Vibes

Gotye chronology
Like Drawing Blood (2006)	Mixed Blood (2007)	Making Mirrors (2011)

Mixed Blood is a remix/cover album of songs originally by Belgian-Australian singer-songwriter Gotye, released in July 2007. All the songs are from his album Like Drawing Blood, except for "The Only Thing I Know" and "Out of My Mind", which come from Gotye's debut album Boardface (although a version of "The Only Thing I Know" was later included in the international release of Like Drawing Blood in 2008).

Karnivool's cover of "The Only Way" came 63rd in the Triple J Hottest 100, 2007.

== Track listing ==
1. "Hearts a Mess" (3am Mix) by Joe Hardy – 6:03
2. "The Only Way" by Karnivool – 4:54
3. "Puzzle with a Piece Missing" (Remix) by ENS – 4:18
4. "Heart's a Mess" (Electro-Baltimore Club Mix) by DLake – 5:23
5. "Get Acquainted" by Faux Pas (a remix of the track "A Distinctive Sound") – 3:51
6. "Learnalilgivinanlovin" (That'll Learn 'Em Remix) by Bass Kleph – 4:17
7. "Thanks for Your Time" (Remix) by Bitrok – 4:12
8. "The Only Thing I Know" (Remix) by Infusion – 4:56
9. "Hearts a Mess" (Remix) by Duosseudo – 5:21
10. "Seven Hours with a Backseat Driver" (Way Back When Mix) by Rocky Lolo – 4:44
11. "Out of My Mind" (Oceans of Dubs) by King Charlie – 4:42
12. "Puzzle with a Piece Missing" by Velure – 4:05
13. "Coming Back" by Inga Liljeström and Michael Lira – 3:20
14. "Worn Out" by Fourth Floor Collapse – 3:06

== Charts ==
Chart performance for Mixed Blood
Chart (2007)	Peak position
Australian Albums (ARIA)	64
