= Over the Love =

Promotional single by Florence and the Machine

from the album The Great Gatsby: Music from Baz Luhrmann's Film
- Released: 17 April 2013
- Recorded: 2012
- Genre: Baroque pop
- Length: 4:21
- Label: Interscope
- Songwriter(s): Stuart Hammond; Kid Harpoon; SBTRKT; Florence Welch
- Producer(s): Emile Haynie; Kid Harpoon; Baz Luhrmann

"Over the Love" is a song recorded by English indie rock band Florence and the Machine for the soundtrack to Baz Luhrmann's 2013 film adaptation of F. Scott Fitzgerald's 1925 novel, The Great Gatsby. It appears as the seventh track on the soundtrack. The song was released as the first promotional single from the album on 17 April 2013, available to stream on SoundCloud in the weeks leading up to the soundtrack's release.

== Composition ==
"Over the Love" is a ballad that builds towards the end and talks about a girl crying over the love for her boyfriend and the distance that separates them.

The lyrics of the song reference symbols from F. Scott Fitzgerald's novel, like the yellow dress Daisy Buchanan wears and the green light that appears outside her home in East Egg's dock. Moreover, the line "'Cause you're a hard soul to save with an ocean in the way, but I'll get around it" symbolizes the space between East Egg and Long Island Sound in West Egg where Jay Gatsby throws parties hoping Daisy will attend. Additionally, an alternative interpretation would be that it is a reference to the Atlantic Ocean as Gatsby's service in World War I originally separated him from Daisy.

The opening lyrics of the song establish the singer as a woman wearing yellow dress while playing the piano as she sings and cries. In the novel, Nick Carraway describes a woman in a yellow dress who is wailing next to the piano at the end of the first party he attended. Another woman tells Nick she "had a fight with a man who says he's her husband." Her tear-stained face is smudged with mascara and guests are telling her to sing the notes on her face.

The lyrics "Now there’s green light in my eyes" and "I can see the green light, I can see it in your eyes", bring a connection to the metaphors of the green light of the lighthouse constantly described in the book.

== Critical reception ==
Perez Hilton acclaimed the song saying, "Florence + [the] Machine has delivered a powerfully emotional song for the film, ["Over the Love"]. With AH-Mazing vocals and lyrics referencing Daisy's yellow dress and other Gatsby moments, this song has us barely able to wait for the film."

Laura Snapes at Pitchfork was less enthralled with the song, noting "The supposedly artsy singer who really demonstrates a dizzying lack of vision is Florence Welch, whose “Over the Love” is first a small, trembling piano ballad before she puts her dreadful, blaring yell to work shouting a reference to the book's most obvious symbol, “I can see the green light/ I can see it in your eyes.”

== Release history ==
Region	Date	Format	Label
Worldwide	17 April 2013	Streaming	Interscope
