= Making Mirrors =

2011 album by Gotye

Studio album by Gotye
- Released: 19 August 2011
- Recorded: 2010–2011
- Studios: Lucas' loungeroom (Melbourne, Australia) (Note: Bass on track 3); The Barn (Merricks, Australia) (Note: Tracks 3 and 4); Soundpark (Northcote, Australia) (Note: Drums on track 4); Moose Mastering (Richmond, Australia) (Note: Cellos and bass on track 4); Matt Walker's house (Upwey, Australia) (Note: Pedal steel guitar on track 4)
- Genres: Indie rock; art pop; indie pop; art rock
- Length: 42:21
- Label: Eleven
- Producer: Gotye

Gotye chronology
Mixed Blood (2007)	Making Mirrors (2011)	Pulling the Stitching Out (2018)

Singles from Making Mirrors
- 1. "Eyes Wide Open" Released: 5 November 2010; 2. "Somebody That I Used to Know" Released: 5 July 2011; 3. "Bronte" Released: 8 August 2011; 4. "I Feel Better" Released: 24 October 2011; 5. "Easy Way Out" Released: 27 February 2012; 6. "Save Me" Released: 13 August 2012

Making Mirrors is the third studio album by Australian singer-songwriter Gotye, released in Australia on 19 August 2011. It included the single "Somebody That I Used to Know", which reached and topped charts worldwide as well as winning several awards. In December 2011, it was announced that Making Mirrors was voted Triple J listeners' number-one album of 2011, making Gotye the first artist to win the Triple J album poll twice. The album won the 2013 Grammy Award for Best Alternative Music Album.

== History and production ==
"Eyes Wide Open" saw Gotye explore new musical territory, with the main bass line from the song recorded on a fence: "I was out there with my old band called The Basics—and Winton is home to this phenomenal thing called the Winton Musical Fence, which is a large fence made out of metal strings stretched between posts [...] I sampled some bits there in 08 and they made it into [the song]."

—Gotye.

In mid-October 2010, Gotye released a single titled "Eyes Wide Open", the first track from the album. The single received generally positive reviews and reached #25 in the Triple J Hottest 100 of 2010.

In late March 2011, Gotye revealed the album's title, which was inspired by an artwork De Backer chanced upon which was edited to create the album cover art. He said, "The mirror reflects on artwork and it is all very related to self-reflection and introspection on the album." Gotye also revealed that the album would see a release in June or July 2011, with a single to precede the release, along with the fact that the album would be similar to its predecessor in terms of diversity. The album was largely recorded at a converted studio at Gotye's parents' farm in the Mornington Peninsula. The release of the album was delayed for over five months due to the composition and recording of a single track.

On 19 May 2011, it was announced that this album would be released on 19 August 2011, with the album to be launched the following day at the Sydney Opera House as part of the Graphic Festival, with animators and a ten-piece orchestra as part of Gotye's performance.

Gotye was also to issue a follow-up single to "Eyes Wide Open" titled "Somebody That I Used to Know", on 11 July 2011. Upon the announcement of the track listing, Gotye also revealed that there would be a DVD accompanying the record which would include music videos and documentaries. However, controversy erupted on 5 July 2011, when the video for the new single, "Somebody That I Used to Know", was leaked online via the Take 40 Australia website. Later that day, the song was aired for the first time on Triple J with the official stamp of approval from Gotye. Gotye released the single six days early, on 5 July 2011, through iTunes Australia, and his website for international followers. The song reached #1 in the ARIA Singles Chart, the ARIA Digital Singles Chart and #1 in the ARIA Australian Artists Chart.

The song went on to be an international success, charting in the top 20 in over 10 countries with 6 of them being at number one; the song also charted in the US and Canada. In Poland, just one day after its release, the album was certified platinum. As of 4 November 2011, the single had received five times platinum sales and the #1 position on the Australian iTunes Store, making it one of the highest-selling singles of 2011. The single has officially been certified nine times platinum, selling over 630,000 copies, making it the most successful Australian song on the ARIA charts of all time.

The album was certified two times platinum by the ARIA Albums Chart, making it the most successful Australian album of 2011. Since then, the album has been certified three times platinum, selling in excess of 210,000 copies in Australia. "Bronte" was released as the third single on 8 August 2011. "I Feel Better" was released as the fourth single from the album in Australia on 24 October 2011. The song, however, failed to reach the top 100. "Easy Way Out" was released in the UK as a promotional single on 3 November 2011. It was eventually released as the fifth single from Making Mirrors in Australia on 27 February 2012.

In 2013, the companion video album Video Mirrors was released, including 12 music videos and one featurette, with a runtime of 59 minutes.

Gotye claimed in 2014 that "there will be no new Gotye music," marking this as his final album under the Gotye name.

In 2019, American rapper Doechii released a song titled "Anxiety" that prominently samples the song "Somebody That I Used to Know". "Anxiety" peaked at number nine on the Billboard Hot 100.

== Concept and themes ==
Shortly before its release, Gotye spoke to the Australian Broadcasting Corporation about the significance of the artwork, the title, and how it symbolises the creative and introspective process of recording the album; "It's more about reflection [...] little ways for me to explore my record collection, explore the world of sound that I'm fascinated by, and also sometimes get a different perspective on memories and emotions I've been mulling over".

Gotye revealed that the second single from the album, "Somebody That I Used to Know", was not lyrically the result of a single break-up. "It wasn't about one specific relationship," explained De Backer in an interview, "but it was definitely drawn from various experiences I've had in relationships breaking up."

Despite the album's huge success, Gotye revealed in an interview with Rolling Stone Australia that he initially battled with indecision and depression while making the album, which in turn became the subject matter of songs like "Smoke and Mirrors" (with a central theme of impostor syndrome) and "Save Me". He stated: "There were points that I thought I wouldn't be able to finish a record I was really into or that I'd give up at some stage."

According to an interview in The Age, the track "State of the Art" is about a secondhand 1970s organ Gotye's parents purchased. The accompanying music video is an animation showing a family purchasing and playing the instrument, which captivates and transforms the family into metal people resembling organ pipes.

== Critical reception ==
Professional ratings
Aggregate scores
Source	Rating
AnyDecentMusic?	6.6/10
Metacritic	69/100
Review scores
Source	Rating
AllMusic	3.5/5 stars
The Daily Telegraph	3/5 stars
Entertainment Weekly	B+
The Guardian	3/5 stars
The Independent	3/5 stars
NME	5/10
Pitchfork	7.7/10
Q	4/5 stars
Rolling Stone	3.5/5 stars
Uncut	4/5 stars

Making Mirrors received generally positive reviews from music critics. At Metacritic, which assigns a normalised rating out of 100 to reviews from mainstream critics, the album received an average score of 69, based on 19 reviews, which indicates "generally favorable reviews".

Caitlin Welsh of The Music Network gave the album a favourable review, saying that it was "just as rich, cheeky and steeped in pop history and musicality as its predecessor and as carefully-constructed and addictive as its breakout track ('Somebody That I Used to Know'), it will cement Wally de Backer as the oddball, everyman genius of Australian pop." The Herald Sun gave it four out of five stars, adding that "Bronte and Giving Me a Chance are the latest in a long line of beautiful, visual songs begging to soundtrack the pivotal scene in a movie that's yet to be made." Radar Radio also gave Making Mirrors four out of five stars.

== Awards ==
At the J Awards of 2011, the album won the Australian Album of the Year.

The album won the 2013 Grammy for Best Alternative Music Album, with Gotye credited as producer and François Tétaz as engineer/mixer.

François Tétaz won the ARIA Award for Engineer of the Year for "Making Mirrors" at the ARIA Music Awards of 2012

== Track listing ==
All tracks are written by Wally De Backer.

No.	Title	Length
1.	"Making Mirrors"	1:01
2.	"Easy Way Out"	1:57
3.	"Somebody That I Used to Know" (featuring Kimbra)	4:04
4.	"Eyes Wide Open"	3:11
5.	"Smoke and Mirrors"	5:13
6.	"I Feel Better"	3:18
7.	"In Your Light"	4:39
8.	"State of the Art"	5:22
9.	"Don't Worry, We'll Be Watching You"	3:18
10.	"Giving Me a Chance"	3:07
11.	"Save Me"	3:53
12.	"Bronte"	3:18
Total length:		42:21

Digital-only tracks
No.	Title	Length
13.	"Dig Your Own Hole"	4:23
14.	"Showdown Below My Sombrero"	2:30
Total length:		49:14

Japanese release – CD 2
No.	Title	Length
1.	"Showdown Below My Sombrero"	2:30
2.	"Dig Your Own Hole"	4:23
3.	"Two Mirrors"	2:42
4.	"Atimot ot Edo"	1:27
5.	"Somebody That I Used To Know" (Bibio Remix)	4:54
6.	"Somebody That I Used To Know" (Gang Colours Remix)	3:19
7.	"Somebody That I Used To Know" (M-Phazes Remix)	4:58
8.	"Somebody That I Used To Know" (4FRNT Remix)	5:18
9.	"Eyes Wide Open" (PVT Remix)	4:10
10.	"Eyes Wide Open" (Alien Delon Remix)	5:51
Total length:		39:32

Limited edition bonus DVD
No.	Title	Length
1.	"The Making of Eyes Wide Open" (documentary)	8:01
2.	"Making Making Mirrors" (documentary)	10:03
3.	"Eyes Wide Open" (music video)	3:18
4.	"Somebody That I Used to Know" (featuring Kimbra) (music video)	4:03
5.	"State of the Art" (music video)	5:18
6.	"Bronte" (music video)	3:14
Total length:		33:57

== Personnel ==
- Wally De Backer – lead and backing vocals, songwriter, samples, instruments
- François Tétaz – dubs and spaces on "Making Mirrors"
- Lucas Taranto – bass guitar on "Easy Way Out", "Somebody That I Used to Know", "I Feel Better", "Save Me", poker bass on "Eyes Wide Open", fretless bass on "Bronte"
- Kimbra – lead and backing vocals on "Somebody That I Used to Know"
- Gareth Skinner – whale cellos on "Eyes Wide Open"
- Michael Hubbard – pedal steel guitar on "Eyes Wide Open"
- Luke Hodgson – bass guitar on "I Feel Better"
- Scott Tinkler – trumpet on "In Your Light"
- Adam Simmons – saxophone on "In Your Light"
- Frank De Backer – album artwork

== Charts ==
=== Weekly charts ===
Weekly chart performance for Making Mirrors
Chart (2011–2012)	Peak position
Australian Albums (ARIA)	1
Austrian Albums (Ö3 Austria)	6
Belgian Albums (Ultratop Flanders)	3
Belgian Albums (Ultratop Wallonia)	6
Canadian Albums (Billboard)	5
Croatian Albums (HDU)	46
Czech Albums (ČNS IFPI)	24
Danish Albums (Hitlisten)	7
Dutch Albums (Album Top 100)	5
French Albums (SNEP)	4
German Albums (Offizielle Top 100)	3
Greek Albums (IFPI)	1
Irish Albums (IRMA)	7
Italian Albums (FIMI)	5
Japanese Albums (Oricon)	65
Mexican Albums (Top 100 Mexico)	50
New Zealand Albums (RMNZ)	8
Norwegian Albums (VG-lista)	11
Polish Albums (ZPAV)	1
Portuguese Albums (AFP)	10
Scottish Albums (Official Charts)	5
South African Albums (RISA)	5
Spanish Albums (Promusicae)	13
Swedish Albums (Sverigetopplistan)	28
Swiss Albums (Schweizer Hitparade)	10
UK Albums (Official Charts)	4
US Billboard 200	6
US Top Alternative Albums (Billboard)	1
US Top Rock Albums (Billboard)	2

=== Year-end charts ===
2011 year-end chart performance for Making Mirrors
Chart (2011)	Position
Australian Albums (ARIA)	4
Belgian Albums (Ultratop Flanders)	10
Dutch Albums (Album Top 100)	43

2012 year-end chart performance for Making Mirrors
Chart (2012)	Position
Australian Albums (ARIA)	39
Austrian Albums (Ö3 Austria)	54
Belgian Albums (Ultratop Flanders)	15
Belgian Albums (Ultratop Wallonia)	19
Canadian Albums (Billboard)	25
Danish Albums (Hitlisten)	31
Dutch Albums (Album Top 100)	65
French Albums (SNEP)	18
German Albums (Offizielle Top 100)	48
Italian Albums (FIMI)	40
Polish Albums (ZPAV)	9
Swiss Albums (Schweizer Hitparade)	38
UK Albums (OCC)	41
US Billboard 200	27
US Top Alternative Albums (Billboard)	6
US Top Rock Albums (Billboard)	6

=== Decade-end charts ===
Decade-end chart performance for Making Mirrors
Chart (2010–2019)	Position
Australian Albums (ARIA)	27
Australian Artist Albums (ARIA)	3
US Billboard 200	177

== Certifications ==
Certifications for Making Mirrors
Region	Certification	Certified units/sales
Australia (ARIA)	4× Platinum	280,000^{‡}
Austria (IFPI Austria)	Gold	10,000^{*}
Belgium (BRMA)	Platinum	30,000^{*}
Canada (Music Canada)	Gold	40,000^{^}
Denmark (IFPI Danmark)	Gold	10,000^{^}
France (SNEP)	Platinum	100,000^{*}
Germany (BVMI)	Platinum	200,000^{‡}
Italy (FIMI)	Gold	30,000^{*}
Netherlands (NVPI)	Gold	25,000^{^}
New Zealand (RMNZ)	2× Platinum	30,000^{‡}
Poland (ZPAV)	2× Platinum	40,000^{*}
United Kingdom (BPI)	Gold	100,000^{^}
United States (RIAA)	2× Platinum	2,000,000^{‡}
^{*} Sales figures based on certification alone.^{^} Shipments figures based on certification alone.^{‡} Sales+streaming figures based on certification alone.

== See also ==
- List of number-one albums of 2011 (Australia)
- List of number-one albums of 2012 (Poland)
