= Learnalilgivinanlovin =

Single by Gotye

from the album Like Drawing Blood
- Released: 2006 (Australia); 2008 (Belgium)
- Recorded: 2003–2005
- Genre: Blue-eyed soul; R&B
- Length: 2:49 (album version)
- Label: Independent, Neon Gold
- Songwriter(s): Gotye
- Producer(s): Gotye

Gotye singles chronology
"Learnalilgivinanlovin" (2006)	"Hearts a Mess" (2007)

"Learnalilgivinanlovin" is a song by the Belgian-Australian singer-songwriter Gotye from his second album Like Drawing Blood released in Australia as a single in 2006. A new version of the song (with the chorus sung in a higher pitch) was released as a single in Belgium in 2008. Another version was released by Neon Gold Records.

== Background ==
The song draws very heavy influence from Motown records of the late '50s and early '60s such as Marvin Gaye and Smokey Robinson and The Miracles. Gotye uses a drum sample from The Ronettes' record, "Be My Baby" (which famously employs Phil Spector's Wall of Sound technique).

== Music video ==
A music video to accompany the Australian version of "Learnalilgivinanlovin" was first released onto YouTube on 6 December 2007.

== Track listing ==
Digital download

1. "Learnalilgivinanlovin" (Passion Pit Mix) – 4:35

Australian CD single

1. "Learnalilgivinanlovin" – 2:50
2. "Seven Hours with a Backseat Driver" – 4:44

== Chart performance ==
Chart (2008)	Peak position
Belgium (Ultratip Bubbling Under Flanders)	10

== In popular culture ==
The song was used in episode 3 of season 1 of the Australian TV series, Packed to the Rafters.

The song also appeared in the film Whip It, as well as on the soundtrack.
