= Velure =

- Velure, the band

Background information
- Origin: Athens, Georgia, United States
- Genres: Rock, alternative rock, Southern rock
- Years active: 1999–present
- Labels: Elixir Records
- Members: Rich Turbo; Ben Holst; Jeff Schaefer; Franher Joseph; Darren Stanley/Sean McCullough/
- Past members: Tim Kassa; Dusty; Joe Mauldin
- Website: www.velurerock.com

Velure is an alternative rock and Southern rock band based in Athens, Georgia, though five of the six members (Rich, Jeff, Ben, Franher, and Darren) now reside in Atlanta, Georgia. Their music is noteworthy for their live shows, four-part harmonies, lyrical content, and diverse sound.

== History ==
Velure was co-founded by Rich Turbo and longtime friend and musical partner Ben Holst, originally of Six Shades Blue in Athens, Georgia, in 1999.

The group began its early career as a band called The Avenues. After transferring to UGA at the beginning of his junior year, Holst met keyboardist Sean McCullough, who had been trained in piano at a young age. The two formed The Avenues, a "jam band,". The Avenues headlined popular venues such as the Georgia Theatre and the 40 Watt Club. Holst began moonlighting with Athens band Six Shades Blue. While maintaining his relationship with McCullough, it was during this time that he became friends with Darren Stanley, drummer of Squat, and bassist Franher Joseph, both of the classic blues band Delta Moon.

The Avenues, now consisting of Holst, McCullough, Stanley and Joseph, was introduced to Rich Turbo, son of pianist Rick C. Turbo of the 70's group Calliko Four, at a local poetry reading. Concerned with the previous direction of the sound and the limitations for a more performance-based show, Turbo approached Holst with the idea of sharpening the sound of the band, lending more towards a rock and pop genre, making it something more progressive and plausible so as to garner a larger and broader audience; Holst agreed.

As Turbo started writing new material, the rest of the group worked to create a new sound and direction for the band. Jeff Schaefer, who was invited to play cello on the recording of the power ballad "Our Story," assisted with this reinvention. The group completed the songs necessary to create a demo album, and asked Schaefer to join them full-time, as rock cellist and rhythm guitarist.

Velure finished their four-song LP recording at Elixir Recordings and got started on a full-length debut album. They toured at various venues in Athens, as well as at Georgia Theatre, the 40 Watt Club, and AMF. They opened for notable recording artist such as Josh Joplin and Jennifer Nettles, and then departed on their own headlining concert tour. Rich Turbo was praised by one music reviewer as having the ability to add a raw edge to the band that had never before been seen.

After completing the touring in 2000, Holst met up with a friend who was co-producer of the Damn Show and asked him to produce Velure's video which they would submit for a chance to appear on VH-1's "Bands on the Run". They were not chosen for the show, having been told they lacked the female component VH-1 wanted, in order to promote diversity.

The band continued appearing in Atlanta concert venues, performing shows at the Darkhorse Tavern and the Cotton Club (now known as The Tabernacle)], among others. Holst worked on learning ProTools and other music engineering skills which he had learned while working at Southern Tracks studios in Atlanta. These skills would lead to music engineering jobs for bands such as Love Tractor, Blueground Undergrass, Drive By Truckers, and R.E.M.

== Band members ==
Velure in Attieville in Athens, GA

=== Latest members ===
- Rich Turbo – lead vocals (1998–present)
- Jeff Schaefer – guitar, cello, violin (1999–present)
- Franher Joseph – bass, upright bass, trumpet, vocals (1998–2001, 2008–present)
- Darren "D" Stanley – drums, percussion (1998–2001, present)
- Ben Holst – guitar, vocals, (1999–2001)
- Sean McCullough – keyboards, keys, Wurlitzer electric piano, vocals (1998–2001)

=== Former members ===
- Dusty Dunn – percussion(1998–1999)
- Joe Mauldin – harmonica (1998–2001)
- Tim Kassa - drums, percussion (1997–1998)

== Discography ==
- "Our Story" (single, 1999)
- Summertime (2000)
- You Were There (1999)
- Blow My Mind (live at Georgia Theatre album, 1998)
- I Choose You (live at Georgia Theatre album, 1998)
- You Never Know (live at Georgia Theatre album, 1998)
- Thankyou (live at Georgia Theatre album, 1998)
- Down the Line (2005)
- So Tell Me (2008)
- In My Own Skin (2009)
- She Said (2009)
- Fields of Green (2009)

=== Videography ===
- "Live At Georgia Theatre" (1999)
- "Live At the Cotton Club" (2000)
- "Blow My Mind" video submission for VH-1's 'Bands On The Run' (1999)
- "VH-1 Bands on the Run Airing of Velure Interview" (2000)
