= Save Me (Gotye song) =

2012 single by Gotye

Single by Gotye

from the album Making Mirrors
- Released: 13 August 2012
- Recorded: January–May 2011; Merricks, Australia (The Barn)
- Genre: Indie pop
- Length: 3:53
- Label: Eleven
- Songwriter(s): Wally de Backer
- Producer(s): Wally de Backer

Gotye singles chronology
"Easy Way Out" (2012)	"Save Me" (2012)	"State of the Art" (2013)

"Save Me" is a song written and recorded by Belgian-Australian singer-songwriter Gotye. The song was released in Australia by Eleven Music on 13 August 2012 as the fifth single from his third studio album, Making Mirrors (2011), a year after the release of his signature song "Somebody That I Used to Know".

== Background ==
Like most of the tracks from Gotye's album, he wrote and recorded the song in a barn on his parents' block of land in the Mornington Peninsula near his hometown, Melbourne in Victoria. The song is lyrically based on Gotye's depression, and the aid that his girlfriend, Tash Parker, brings, which some other tracks also use as subject matter.

== Music video ==
A music video to accompany the release of "Save Me" was first released onto YouTube on 8 August 2012 at a total length of three minutes and fifty-four seconds. The video was directed and animated by Peter Lowey.

== Track listing ==
Digital download
No.	Title	Length
1.	"Save Me"	3:53

== Chart performance ==
Chart (2012)	Peak position
Belgium (Ultratip Bubbling Under Flanders)	12

== Release history ==
Region	Date	Format	Label
Australia	13 August 2012	Digital download	Eleven Music
