= Eyes Wide Open (Gotye song) =

Single by Gotye

from the album Making Mirrors
- B-side: "Atimot ot Edo", "Smoke and Mirrors"
- Released: 5 November 2010
- Recorded: 2010
- Genre: Worldbeat, alternative rock
- Length: 3:07
- Label: Eleven: A Music Company
- Songwriter: Wally De Backer
- Producer: Wally De Backer

Gotye singles chronology
"Hearts a Mess" (2007)	"Eyes Wide Open" (2010)	"Somebody That I Used to Know" (2011)

"Eyes Wide Open" is a song by the Belgian-Australian musician Gotye from his third studio album Making Mirrors. It was released as a digital download on 5 November 2010 in Australia and 4 June 2012 in the United States and United Kingdom. The song was written and produced by Gotye. It peaked at No. 55 on the Australian Singles Chart and was voted in at No. 25 in the 2010 Triple J Hottest 100. It becomes the first Gotye single to chart in the U.S. reaching #96 on the Billboard Hot 100

The song features the Winton Musical Fence, a large fence with metal strings. Gotye sampled the Musical Fence in 2008 during a stay in Winton, Queensland.

In 2018, Broods released "Eyes a Mess", a cover medley of "Eyes Wide Open" and "Hearts a Mess".

== Music video ==
A music video to accompany the release of "Eyes Wide Open" was first released onto YouTube on 25 October 2010 at a total length of three minutes and seventeen seconds. The music video was created by Sydney production company pictureDRIFT and directed by Brendan Cook. It features stop-motion animation created by Darcy Prenderghast of creatures riding on spider-legged boats over several barren terrains, searching for water. Perhaps due to the lack of water, their faces crumble. Underneath, we see Gotye's face as he sings the song but the face gets hidden away due to the use of water. The singer's face is also shown when the creatures project it in holograms through their eyes.

== Track listing ==
Digital download

1. "Eyes Wide Open" – 3:07

10" vinyl

1. "Atimot ot Edo"
2. "Eyes Wide Open"
3. "Smoke and Mirrors"
4. "Eyes Wide Open" (PVT Remix)

== Personnel ==
- Wally De Backer – lead & backing vocals, drums, Winton Musical Fence, piano, sampled sounds
- Gareth Skinner – cellos
- Lucas Taranto – bass guitar
- Michael Hubbard – pedal steel guitar

== Chart performance ==
Chart (2010–12)	Peak position
Australia (ARIA)	55
Belgium (Ultratop 50 Flanders)	33
UK Official Streaming Chart Top 100	78
US Billboard Hot 100	96
US Adult Alternative Songs (Billboard)	28
US Alternative Songs (Billboard)	22
US Rock Songs (Billboard)	35

== Certifications ==
Certifications for "Eyes Wide Open"
Region	Certification	Certified units/sales
Australia (ARIA)	Platinum	70,000^{‡}
^{‡} Sales+streaming figures based on certification alone.

== Radio and release history ==
Region	Date	Label	Format
Australia	5 November 2010	Eleven: A Music Company	Digital download
Germany	4 May 2012	Universal Music	CD single
United Kingdom	4 June 2012	Island Records	Digital download (re-release)
