= Like Drawing Blood =

2006 album by Gotye

Studio album by Gotye
- Released: 21 May 2006
- Recorded: 2003–2005
- Genres: Art pop, indie rock, downtempo, electronica
- Length: 47:50
- Labels: Independent; Creative Vibes

Gotye chronology
Boardface (2003)	Like Drawing Blood (2006)	Mixed Blood (2007)

Singles from Like Drawing Blood
- 1. "Learnalilgivinanlovin" Released: 2006 (Australia); 2008 (Belgium); 2. "Hearts a Mess" Released: 2007; 3. "Coming Back" Released: 2008 (Belgium)

Like Drawing Blood is the second studio album by Belgian-Australian singer-songwriter Gotye, released in Australia on 21 May 2006. Three tracks from the album, "Hearts a Mess", "Coming Back", and "Learnalilgivinanlovin" were released as singles.

== Description ==
All the sounds on the album were collected and assembled or performed by Wally De Backer in bedrooms around Melbourne between 2003 and 2005, and the record was mixed and mastered by François Tétaz. It was featured heavily by Triple J in May 2006. At the J Award of 2006, the album was nominated for Australian Album of the Year.

Two songs from Like Drawing Blood rated in the Triple J Hottest 100, 2006: "Hearts a Mess" at number 8, and "Learnalilgivinanlovin" at number 94. Like Drawing Blood also received the number one spot on the 2006 Triple J Album Poll for best album of the year, as voted by Triple J listeners.

The album was also released in Belgium, on 30 May 2008, with three alterations: it contains a new version of "Learnalilgivinanlovin" with higher-pitched vocals in the chorus; the track "Coming Back" removes a sample in the intro and bridge, and the song "A Distinctive Sound" is replaced by a new version of "The Only Thing I Know" (the original appeared on Gotye's debut album Boardface). Also, three singles were released in Belgium: "Learnalilgivinanlovin", "Hearts a Mess", and "Coming Back".

Like Drawing Blood was voted into the number 11 spot on the 2011 Triple J Hottest 100 Australian Albums of All Time, as voted by the Triple J listeners.

In 2012 it was awarded a double silver certification from the Independent Music Companies Association, which indicated sales of at least 40,000 copies throughout Europe.

The title of the album Like Drawing Blood refers to the difficulty Gotye endured to create it. When asked about the title in a 2008 interview with FaceCulture, Gotye replied: "yeah, it's a little bit Gothic, obviously, than is appropriate for the music that's on the album, it was just— it was a hard album to write for me because almost— heaps of times, at least every month, in the maybe two years that I spent writing the record, I was ready to just kind of go, 'what am I doing, this is no good', or 'it's too hard', or 'I'm never going to, you know, make— finish an album', so it was quite a challenging thing to continue to go, this is worth keeping to doing— you know, keeping going with this; um, so in a way it was kinda like it took so much out of me for two years, kind of off and on, trying to finish the record; it felt a little bit like, yeah, it was kind of like taking the very kind of life energy from me, like drawing blood, um, to put into making this record, um, and it also has a title that went hand-in-hand with the album cover, which has, kind of, what looks like, kind of splatters of blood on a canvas, um, just a painting I did when I was young". In a 2012 interview with FaceCulture, Gotye stated that it "was obviously named after the suggestion that it was a difficult experience, that it was like, you know, taking a part of myself, a lifeblood", explaining that he "didn't really get a lot of time to work on Like Drawing Blood" due to spending time at various jobs trying to make ends meet.

== Track listing ==
Australian release (2006)

No.	Title	Writer(s)	Length
1.	"Like Drawing Blood"	Gotye	0:22
2.	"The Only Way"	Gotye; Bruno Libert; Raymond Vincent	4:49
3.	"Hearts a Mess"	Gotye; Irving Budgie; William Attaway	6:06
4.	"Coming Back"	Gotye	6:54
5.	"Thanks for Your Time"	Gotye	4:18
6.	"Learnalilgivinanlovin"	Gotye	2:50
7.	"Puzzle with a Piece Missing"	Gotye	5:41
8.	"A Distinctive Sound"	Gotye	6:17
9.	"Seven Hours with a Backseat Driver"	Gotye	4:44
10.	"Night Drive"	Gotye	5:12
11.	"Worn Out Blues"	Gotye; Carol Connors; David Shire	0:38

International release (2008)

No.	Title	Length
1.	"Like Drawing Blood"	0:21
2.	"The Only Way"	4:44
3.	"Hearts a Mess"	6:05
4.	"Coming Back" (2008 version)	6:08
5.	"Thanks for Your Time"	4:20
6.	"Learnalilgivinanlovin" (2008 version)	2:49
7.	"Puzzle with a Piece Missing"	5:40
8.	"Seven Hours with a Backseat Driver"	4:43
9.	"The Only Thing I Know" (2008 version)	7:03
10.	"Night Drive"	5:11
11.	"Worn Out Blues"	0:38

Japanese edition bonus track

No.	Title	Length
12.	"A Distinctive Sound"

== Reception ==
Professional ratings
Review scores
Source	Rating
The Age	(favorable)
Allmusic	3.5/5 stars
Pitchfork Media	(6.8/10)
PopMatters	(7/10)

The album was well-received by critics. Andrew Drever of The Age said of the album that "De Backer bravely tackles a mind-boggling array of musical styles with conviction and flair...That he never once missteps, pulling off every musical style he attempts with aplomb and skill, highlights the arrival of an important new talent." Pitchfork described the album as "full of dark pop, produced with an open clarity that separates the numerous sounds and consequently comes off as huge and sweeping...Like Drawing Blood is memorable and captivating." PopMatters gave the album a favourable review, stating that "Like Drawing Blood plays as a remarkably consistent, high quality electronic mix album, with thoughtful song/song transitions and a sustained, easily established mood." Allmusic editor Jon O'Brien called the album "an impressively eclectic cut-and-paste affair" and stated, "A little more control in the editing suite might have helped, then, but Like Drawing Blood is still an engaging and diverse affair".

== Appearances in media ==
- "Hearts a Mess" was featured in the 6th episode of the Seven Network's TV Show Packed to the Rafters.
- "Hearts a Mess" was featured in the 23rd episode entitled "The Wrath of Con" of the second season of the CW TV show Gossip Girl.
- "Learnalilgivinanlovin'" appears in the end credits of the 2010 film Going the Distance.
- "Hearts a Mess" appeared in the soundtrack 2013 film The Great Gatsby.

== Credits ==
- Wally De Backer – lead and backing vocals, writing, production, performance, artwork
- Jacob Uljans – vocal recording on "Thanks for Your Time"
- Lucas Taranto – bass guitar on "Coming Back"
- Francois Tetaz – mixing, mastering, additional production
- Tim Shiel – album layout

== Chart performance ==
Chart	Year	Peak position
Australian Albums Chart	2006/11	13
Belgian Albums Chart (Flanders)	2008	45

== Certifications ==
Region	Certification	Certified units/sales
Australia (ARIA)	Platinum	70,000^{^}
^{^} Shipments figures based on certification alone.
