= I Feel Better (Gotye song) =

Single by Gotye

from the album Making Mirrors
- Released: 25 October 2011
- Recorded: 2010
- Genre: Blue-eyed soul, R&B
- Length: 3:18
- Label: Eleven: A Music Company
- Songwriter(s): Wally De Backer
- Producer(s): Wally De Backer

Gotye singles chronology
"Somebody That I Used to Know" (2011)	"I Feel Better" (2011)	"Easy Way Out" (2012)

"I Feel Better" is a song by the Belgian-Australian musician Gotye from his third studio album Making Mirrors. It was released as a digital download on 25 October 2011 in Australia. The song was written/produced by Gotye. The song has charted in Flanders. The trumpet melody which is used in the intro and the bridge was sampled from "Brazil" by Edmundo Ros.

== Track listing ==
Digital download
No.	Title	Length
1.	"I Feel Better"	3:18

== Personnel ==
- Wally De Backer – lead & backing vocals, drums, percussion, piano, dulcimer, horn samples
- Lucas Taranto – bass guitar
- Luke Hodgson – bass guitar

== Chart performance ==
Chart (2012)	Peak position
Belgium (Ultratip Bubbling Under Flanders)	2

== Release history ==
Region	Date	Label	Format
Australia	25 October 2011	Eleven: A Music Company	Digital download

== In popular culture ==
The chorus of "I Feel Better" featured in an episode of The Simpsons titled "Whiskey Business".
