= Boardface =

Studio album by Gotye
- Released: 15 February 2003
- Recorded: 2001–2002 Melbourne, Victoria
- Genre: Indie rock, electronica, downtempo, experimental
- Length: 57:36
- Label: Creative Vibes
- Producer: Wally De Backer

Gotye chronology
Boardface EP (2002)	Boardface (2003)	Like Drawing Blood (2006)

Singles from Boardface
- 1. "Out Here in the Cold" Released: 2003

Boardface is the debut studio album by Belgian-Australian singer Gotye. It was originally released in 2003, and then re-released as a companion to his follow-up breakthrough album, Like Drawing Blood.

== Development ==
In 2001, Gotye recorded his first tracks primarily using samples. He put together a four-track CD which included the song "Out Here in the Cold". He made approximately 50 copies of this first collection, handwriting the track list and colouring in the cover sleeve in pencil. He drew on his cultural history for inspiration when naming his new project; Wouter, Gotye's birth name, translates into French as Gaultier (or Gautier or Gauthier), a pet name used by his mother (who gave French classes) when he was a child. He chose his own spelling of this variation and named the project 'Gotye'. He sent the CDs out to every radio station and recording industry contact he could find in the phonebook, then followed each up with phone calls to ensure they were delivered. Feedback on the first release was mainly positive with Melbourne street press and Australian youth radio station Triple J taking notice, giving him confidence to continue with further sample-based recordings.

Around this time, Gotye met fellow singer-songwriter Kris Schroeder at a party in Mt Eliza, and the two began performing together under the name The Basics. They formed an enduring songwriting and performing partnership and became regulars on the live music scene, giving De Backer an outlet for his passion for live performance. The Basics have continued to tour and record alongside Gotye, releasing four albums between 2004 and 2010.

Wouter went on to produce two more four-track Gotye collections which were met with positive reviews, with several tracks getting onto the rotation at Triple J. The CDs were made in the same style as the first, with De Backer hand crafting each one and tenaciously chasing up every opportunity to get an audience for his work. Interest in the Gotye project was growing, and De Backer was eventually offered a distribution deal for an album, which would essentially be a collection of the tracks from his three earlier releases. This album was released as Boardface in 2003.

== Track listing ==
All tracks are written by Wally De Backer.

No.	Title	Length
1.	"Out Here in the Cold"	6:24
2.	"True to You"	5:11
3.	"The Only Thing I Know"	7:16
4.	"Wonder Why You Want Her"	4:24
5.	"What Do You Want?"	3:36
6.	"Out of My Mind"	4:12
7.	"Here in This Place"	5:57
8.	"Waiting for You"	1:35
9.	"Loath to Refuse"	5:50
10.	"Noir Excursion"	6:08
11.	"Baby"	6:00
12.	"Untitled"	1:02
Total length:		57:36

Note: On physical copies, track 12 (a reprise of "Waiting for You") is not listed. The song "Baby" ends at 4:50 and is followed by 1:10 of silence before track 12 starts.

=== Earlier releases ===
Gotye — EP
No.	Title	Length
4.	"Riding the Pumpkin Home"	4:57
6.	"(2nd Generation Dub) Lullaby"	6:11
7.	"Eighties Bonanza (Stadium Jam)"	2:51

Boardface — EP
No.	Title	Length
2.	"Lordy Momma"	5:12
3.	"Down There Too"	6:27
4.	"Children of the Universe"	5:50
5.	"The One for Me"	5:35

== Credits ==
- Wally De Backer – lead and backing vocals, writing, production, performance
- Michaela Alexander – vocals on "Out of My Mind" and "Loath to Refuse"
- Christine Auriant – vocals on "True to You" and "Noir Excursion"
- Michael Arvanitakis – bass on "Out of My Mind"
- Mark Drysdale – bass on "Here in This Place"
- Lucas Taranto – bass on "Loath to Refuse"
- Ben Brazil – saxophone on "Here in This Place"
- Ben Spaull – guitar on "The Only Thing I Know"
- Tim Downey – guitar on "Wonder Why You Want Her" and "Loath to Refuse"
- Michael McClintock – mastering on "The Only Thing I Know", "Out of My Mind", "Here in This Place", "Waiting for You" and "Noir Excursion"
- David Briggs – mastering on "Out Here in the Cold", "True to You", "Wonder Why You Want Her", "What Do You Want?", "Loath to Refuse", "Baby" and "Untitled"
- Frank De Backer – artwork
