= The Great Gatsby (2013 film) =

2013 film by Baz Luhrmann

- Theatrical release poster
- Directed by: Baz Luhrmann
- Screenplay by: Baz Luhrmann; Craig Pearce
- Based on: The Great Gatsby by F. Scott Fitzgerald
- Produced by: Baz Luhrmann; Catherine Martin; Douglas Wick; Lucy Fisher; Catherine Knapman
- Starring: Leonardo DiCaprio; Tobey Maguire; Carey Mulligan; Amitabh Bachchan; Joel Edgerton; Elizabeth Debicki; Isla Fisher; Jason Clarke
- Cinematography: Simon Duggan
- Edited by: Matt Villa; Jason Ballantine; Jonathan Redmond
- Music by: Craig Armstrong
- Production companies: Village Roadshow Pictures; Bazmark Productions; A&E Television; Red Wagon Entertainment
- Distributed by: Warner Bros. Pictures (Worldwide); Roadshow Entertainment (Australia)
- Release dates: May 1, 2013 (New York City); May 10, 2013 (United States); May 30, 2013 (Australia)
- Running time: 142 minutes
- Countries: Australia; United States
- Language: English
- Budget: $105–190 million
- Box office: $353.6 million

The Great Gatsby is a 2013 historical romantic drama film based on the 1925 novel by F. Scott Fitzgerald. The film was co-written and directed by Baz Luhrmann and stars an ensemble cast consisting of Leonardo DiCaprio, Tobey Maguire, Carey Mulligan, Joel Edgerton, Amitabh Bachchan, Isla Fisher, Jason Clarke, and Elizabeth Debicki. Filming took place from September to December 2011 in Australia, with a $105 million net production budget. The film follows the life and times of millionaire Jay Gatsby (DiCaprio) and his neighbor Nick Carraway (Maguire), who recounts his interactions with Gatsby amid the riotous parties of the Jazz Age on Long Island in New York.

A polarizing film among critics, The Great Gatsby received both praise and criticism for its visual style, direction, performances, soundtrack, and interpretation of the source material. Audiences responded more positively, and Fitzgerald's granddaughter praised the film, stating "Scott would have been proud." As of 2023, it is Luhrmann's highest-grossing film, grossing over $353 million worldwide. At the 86th Academy Awards, the film won in both of its nominated categories: Best Production Design and Best Costume Design.

== Plot ==
In December 1929, alcoholic World War I veteran Nick Carraway, undergoing treatment at a psychiatric hospital, tells his doctor about Jay Gatsby, the most hopeful man he ever met. The doctor suggests Nick tap into his passion and write down his thoughts, and Nick begins cataloging the events to his doctor.

Seven years earlier, in the summer of 1922, after abandoning writing, Nick moved from the Midwest to New York, where he rents a small groundskeeper's cottage in the North Shore village of West Egg, next to the mansion of Gatsby, a mysterious business magnate who often hosts extravagant parties. Nick has dinner with his cousin Daisy Buchanan and her domineering husband, Tom, at their mansion in East Egg. Daisy plays matchmaker between Nick and another guest, Jordan Baker, a famous golfer. When Nick returns home, he sees Gatsby standing by the harbor, reaching toward a green light coming from the Buchanans' dock.

Tom brings Nick to the Valley of Ashes, an industrial dumping site between West Egg and the city and picks up his mistress Myrtle Wilson at a garage owned by her husband George. One day, Nick receives an invitation to one of Gatsby's parties. There, Nick encounters Jordan and they both meet Gatsby. Gatsby takes Nick to Manhattan for lunch, telling Nick on the way that he is an Oxford graduate and war hero from a wealthy Midwestern family. They go to a speakeasy, where Gatsby introduces Nick to his business partner Meyer Wolfsheim.

Jordan tells Nick how Gatsby, a Captain of the U.S. Army, started a relationship with Daisy in 1917 before the United States entered World War I, and is still in love with her; he throws parties hoping that Daisy might attend. Gatsby asks Nick to invite Daisy to tea. After an awkward reunion, Gatsby and Daisy begin an affair. Gatsby is dismayed when Daisy wants to run away with him, preferring that she get a proper divorce. He asks Nick and Jordan to accompany him to the Buchanan home, where he and Daisy plan to tell Tom that Daisy is leaving him. During the luncheon, Tom becomes suspicious of Gatsby and Daisy, but Daisy stops Gatsby from revealing anything to Tom and suggests they all go to the Plaza Hotel. Tom drives Nick and Jordan in Gatsby's car while Gatsby drives Daisy in Tom's car. Tom stops for gas at George's garage, where George tells him that he and Myrtle are moving.

At the Plaza, Tom accuses Gatsby of having never attended Oxford and having made his fortune through bootlegging with mobsters, leading to Gatsby losing his temper and almost punching Tom. Eventually, both Gatsby and Daisy leave. After fighting with George over her infidelity, Myrtle runs into the street and is fatally struck by Gatsby's car after mistaking it for Tom's. Upon learning about Myrtle's death, Tom tells George that the car belongs to Gatsby and that he suspects Gatsby was Myrtle's lover, while Nick deduces Daisy was driving when the accident happened. Nick, overhearing Daisy willing to stay with Tom, urges Gatsby to forget about Daisy and leave West Egg before being tracked down, but Gatsby refuses and believes that Daisy needs time to realize her love for him.

Inside his mansion, Gatsby tells Nick the truth: he was born penniless, his real name is James Gatz, and he had asked Daisy to wait for him until he had made something of himself after the war; instead, she married Tom seven months after the war ended. The next day, Nick goes back to work, and Gatsby awaits a call from Daisy while swimming in his pool. The phone rings, and Gatsby's butler answers it. Believing the caller to be Daisy, Gatsby is shot and killed by a vengeful George, who then commits suicide. Nick, who was the one calling, hears the gunshots and is the only person other than reporters to attend Gatsby's funeral as the Buchanans leave New York. The media falsely and negatively paints Gatsby as Myrtle's lover and killer, enraging Nick. Disgusted with both the city and its inhabitants, Nick leaves after taking a final walk-through Gatsby's deserted mansion and reflecting on Gatsby's ability to hope.

Nick finishes typing his memoir and titles it The Great Gatsby.

== Cast ==
- Leonardo DiCaprio as James Gatz / Jay Gatsby, a mysterious millionaire who hosts wild parties at his house with the hope that his former lover Daisy will return
  - Tasman Palazzi as young James Gatz
  - Callan McAuliffe as teen James Gatz
- Tobey Maguire as Nick Carraway, an aspiring writer, Gatsby's friend, and the film's narrator
- Carey Mulligan as Daisy Buchanan, Gatsby's former lover, Tom's wife, and Nick's cousin
- Joel Edgerton as Tom Buchanan, an old money socialite who hates Gatsby because of his new money status and relationship with Daisy
- Jason Clarke as George Wilson, Myrtle's husband and owner of a gas station in Valley of Ashes
- Isla Fisher as Myrtle Wilson, Tom's mistress and an ambitious social climber
- Elizabeth Debicki as Jordan Baker, a golf star and Daisy's best friend
- Amitabh Bachchan as Meyer Wolfsheim, a gambler who met Gatsby in 1919
- Jack Thompson as Walter Perkins, a doctor at the psychiatric hospital where Nick is a patient
- Adelaide Clemens as Catherine, Myrtle's sister
- Richard Carter as Herzog, Gatsby's butler
- Steve Bisley as Dan Cody, an alcoholic millionaire yacht owner that Gatsby met in his teenage years
- Felix Williamson as Henri
- Barry Otto as Benny McClenehan
- Heather Mitchell as Daisy's Mother
- Brian Rooney as Clerk – Probity Trust

== Production ==
=== Development ===
Prior to the 2013 adaptation, there were four earlier film adaptations of F. Scott Fitzgerald's 1925 novel of the same name, including a now-lost 1926 version, a 1949 version, a 1974 version, and a 2000 made for TV version. In December 2008, Variety reported that Baz Luhrmann would direct this latest adaptation. Luhrmann stated that he planned it to be more up-to-date due to its theme of criticizing the often irresponsible lifestyles of wealthy people.

While Luhrmann was at the Consumer Electronics Show in January 2011, he told The Hollywood Reporter that he had been workshopping The Great Gatsby in 3D, though he had not yet decided whether to shoot in the format. In late January 2011, Luhrmann showed doubt about staying on board with the project but decided to stay. In 2010, it was reported that the film was being set up by Sony Pictures Entertainment. However, by 2011, Warner Bros. Pictures was close to acquiring a deal to finance and take worldwide distribution of The Great Gatsby.

=== Casting ===
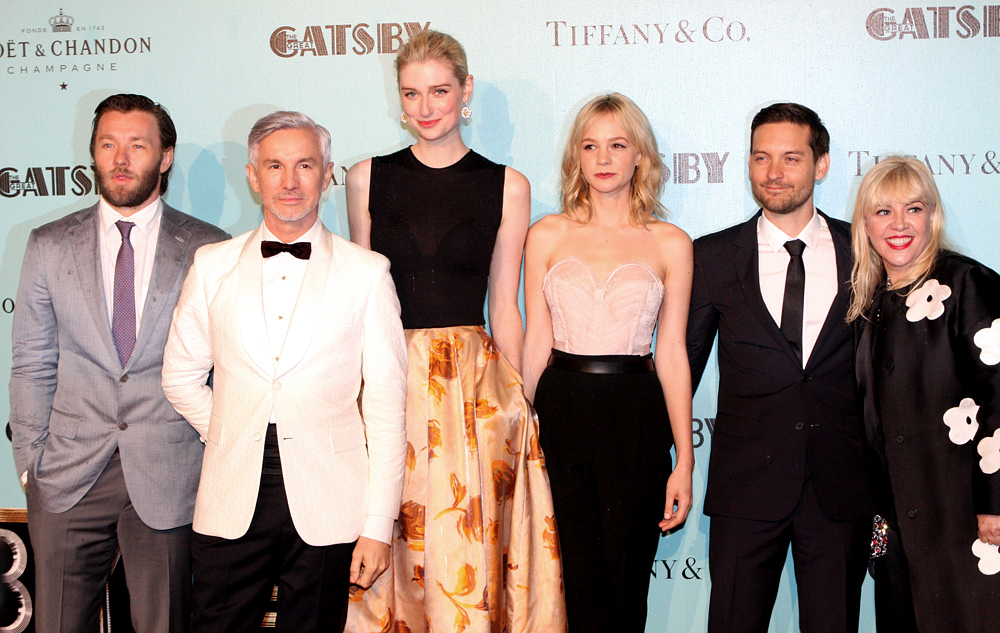
From left to right: Joel Edgerton, director Baz Luhrmann, Elizabeth Debicki, Carey Mulligan, Tobey Maguire, and producer and designer Catherine Martin at the premiere of The Great Gatsby in Sydney, May 22, 2013

Luhrmann said the results from the movie's workshop process of auditioning actors for roles in The Great Gatsby had been "very encouraging" to him. Leonardo DiCaprio was cast first, in the title role of Jay Gatsby. It is the second time Luhrmann and DiCaprio worked together; DiCaprio costarred in Luhrmann's Romeo + Juliet (1996). Tobey Maguire was cast to play Nick Carraway, marking the third collaboration between Maguire and DiCaprio following This Boy's Life and Don's Plum.

Initial reports linked Amanda Seyfried to the lead role of Daisy Buchanan, in October 2010. The next month Deadline Hollywood reported that Luhrmann had been auditioning numerous actresses, including Seyfried, Keira Knightley, Jessica Alba, Rebecca Hall, Blake Lively, Abbie Cornish, Michelle Williams and Scarlett Johansson, as well as considering Natalie Portman, for Daisy. Soon afterward, with her commitment to Cameron Crowe's We Bought a Zoo (2011), Johansson pulled out.

On November 15, Luhrmann announced that Carey Mulligan had been cast to play Daisy after reading for the part on November 2 in New York. Mulligan won the role shortly after Luhrmann showed her audition footage to Sony Pictures Entertainment executives Amy Pascal and Doug Belgrad, who were impressed by the actress' command of the character. Mulligan burst into tears after learning of her casting via a phone call from Luhrmann, who informed her of his decision while she was on the red carpet at an event in New York. Luhrmann said: "I was privileged to explore the character with some of the world's most talented actresses, each one bringing their own particular interpretation, all of which were legitimate and exciting. However, specific to this particular production of The Great Gatsby, I was thrilled to pick up the phone an hour ago to the young Oscar-nominated British actress Carey Mulligan and say to her: 'Hello, Daisy Buchanan.'"

In April 2011, Ben Affleck was in talks about playing the role of Tom Buchanan but had to pass due to a scheduling conflict with Argo (2012). Bradley Cooper had previously lobbied for the part, and Luke Evans was a major contender. In May, Joel Edgerton was confirmed in the part of Tom. Isla Fisher was cast to play Myrtle Wilson.

Australian newcomer Elizabeth Debicki won the part of Jordan Baker. While casting for the supporting role of Jordan, Luhrmann said the character must be "as thoroughly examined as Daisy, for this production, for this time", adding, "It's like Olivier's Hamlet was the right Hamlet for his time. Who would Hamlet be today? Same with a Jordan or a Daisy".

In June 2011, Jason Clarke was cast as George B. Wilson. Indian actor Amitabh Bachchan appears as Meyer Wolfshiem in his first Hollywood role. Bachchan worked for free, as a favor to Luhrmann.

=== Screenplay ===
The screenplay by Baz Luhrmann and Craig Pearce made five notable changes to the novel's plot: Nick Carraway writes from a sanitarium, having checked himself in some time after the summer with Gatsby; he flirts with Jordan Baker but, unlike what happens in the novel, he is "too smitten with Gatsby to notice her"; Gatsby himself makes a grand entrance, whereas in the novel some time passes as they talk before Carraway realizes who he is; some of the racism or antisemitism has been toned down or removed; finally, Gatsby dies thinking his pursuit of Daisy was successful.

=== Filming ===
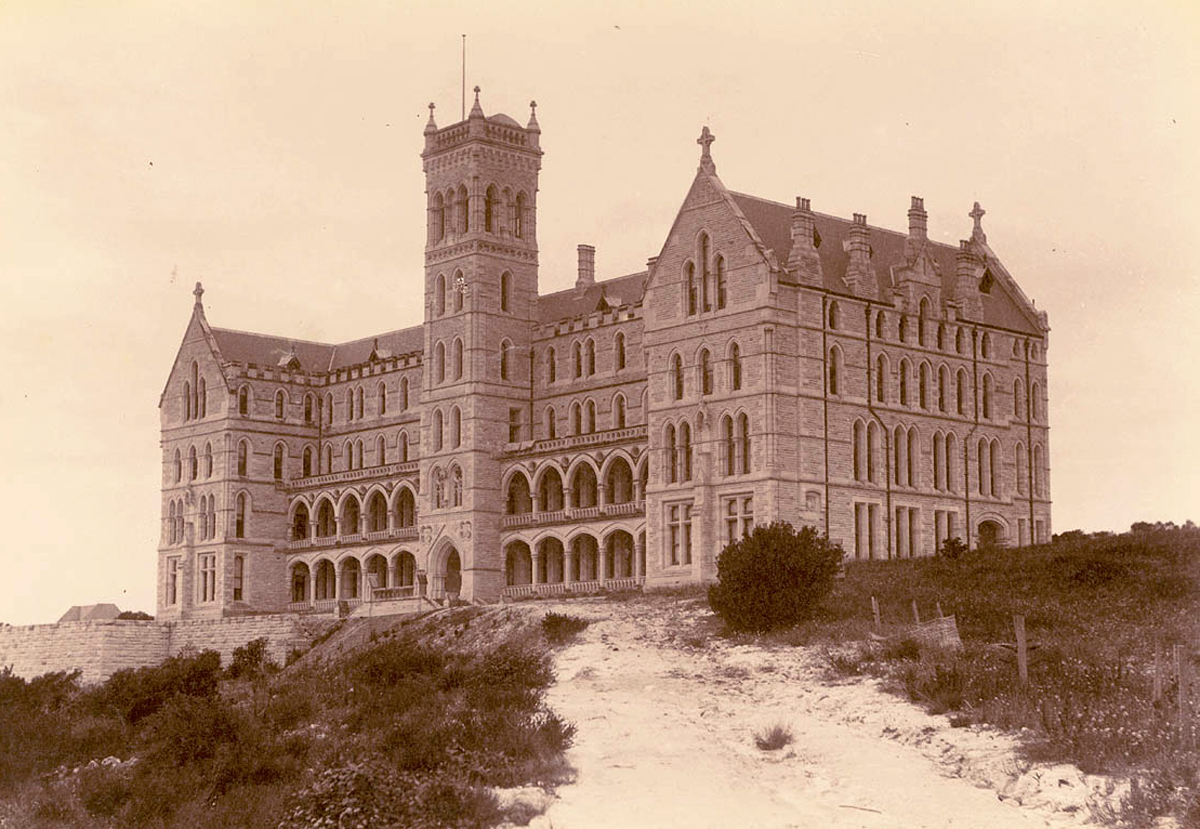
St Patrick's Seminary in Manly, New South Wales doubled as Gatsby's home.

Principal photography was shot in Sydney. Filming began on September 5, 2011, at Fox Studios Australia and finished on December 22, 2011, with additional shots filmed in January 2012. The film was shot with Red Epic digital cameras and Zeiss Ultra Prime lenses. The "Valley of Ashes", the desolate land located between West Egg and New York, was shot in Balmain, New South Wales.

Manly Business School in Manly, New South Wales—known as Saint Patrick's Seminary—doubled as Gatsby's mansion. Palm trees had to be digitally removed in post-production to convey a faithfulness to the Long Island setting. Nick's house was located in Centennial Park. Daisy's house was Gowan Brae, a historic mansion at The King's School, Parramatta.

==== Sets ====
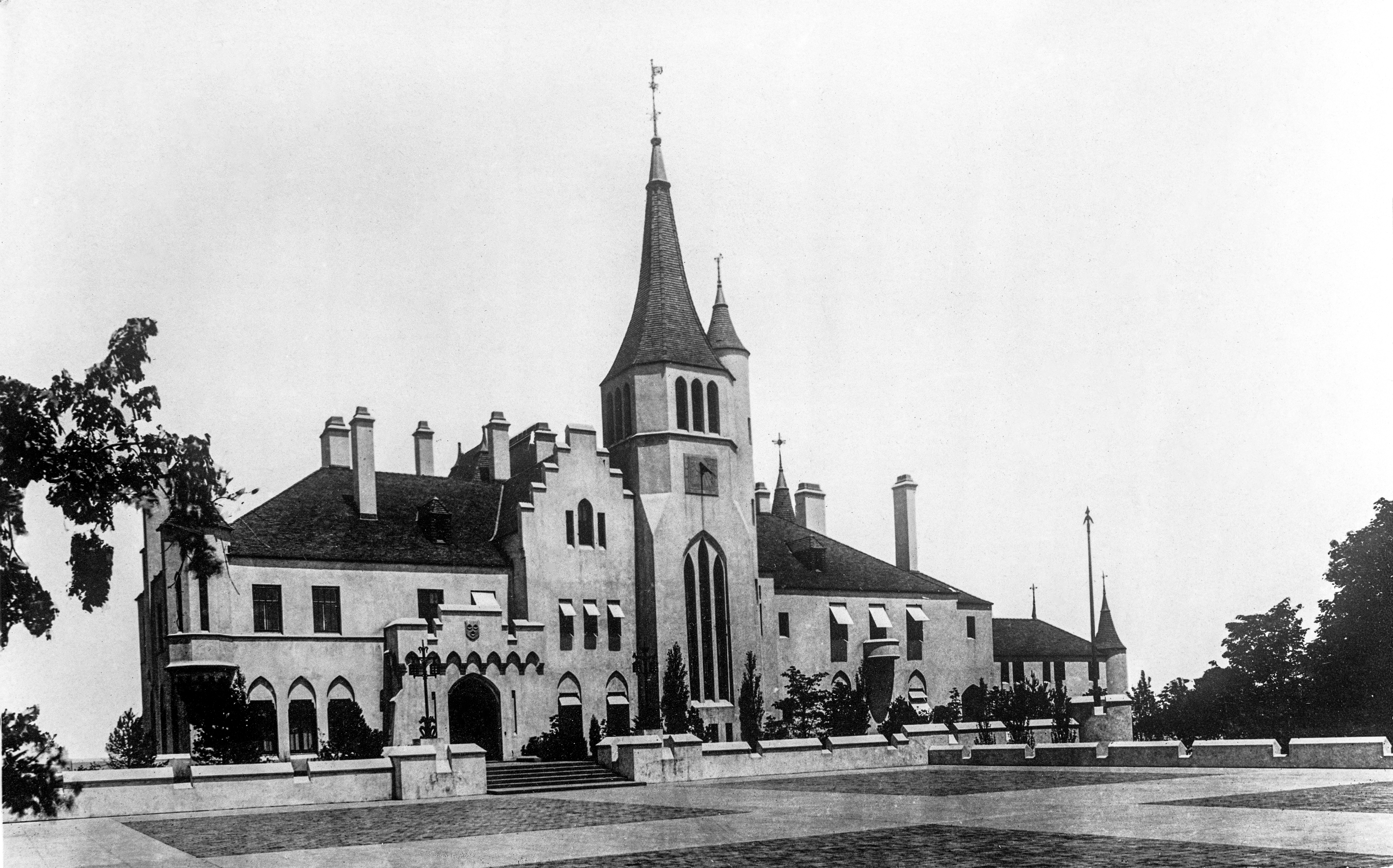
The now demolished Beacon Towers partly inspired the design of Gatsby's mansion.

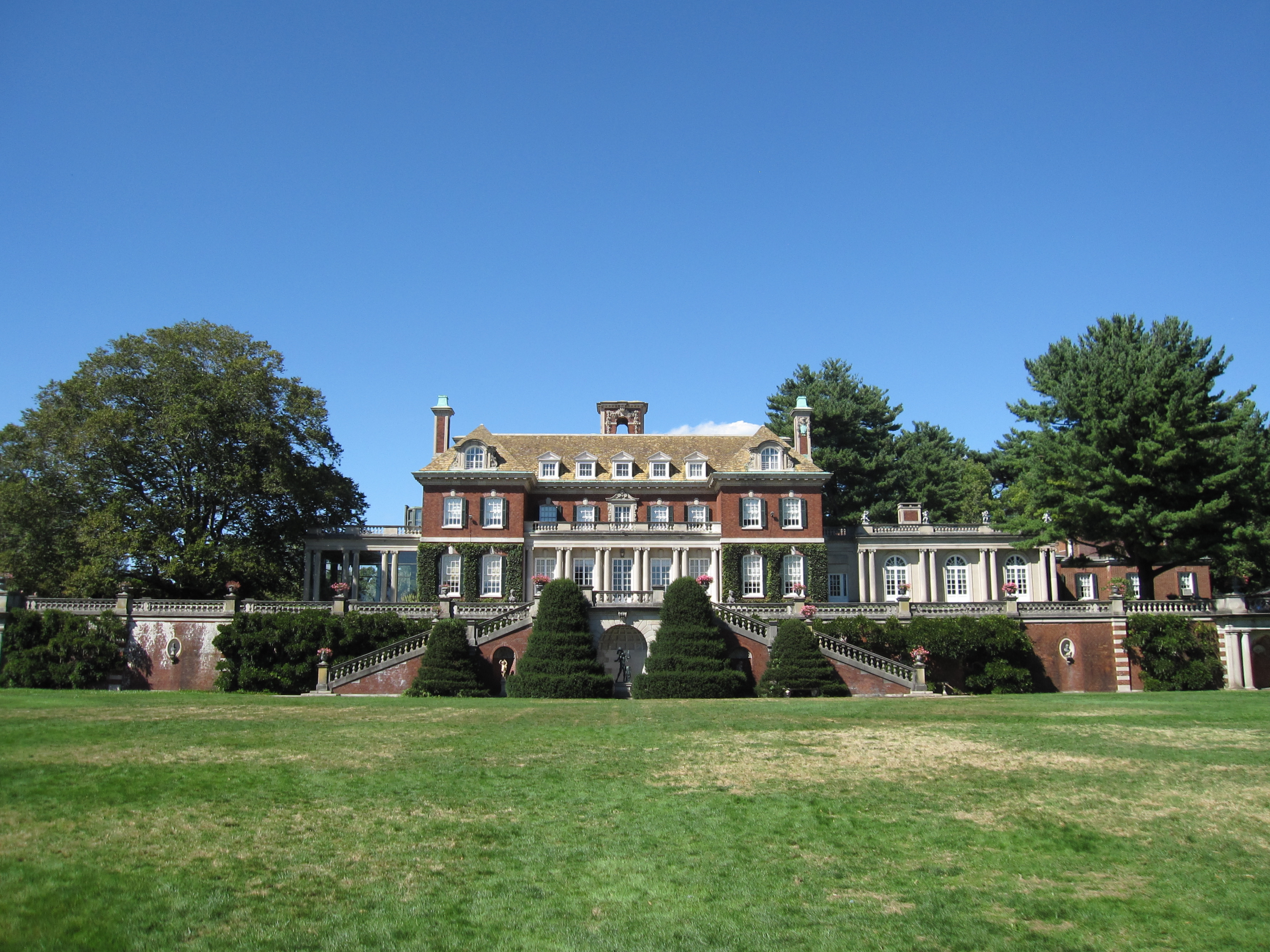
Old Westbury Gardens in New York inspired the Buchanan estate.

In creating the background scenery for the world depicted in the film, designer Catherine Martin stated that the team styled the interior sets of Jay Gatsby's mansion with gilded opulence in a style that blended establishment taste with Art Deco. The long-destroyed Beacon Towers, thought by scholars to have partially inspired Fitzgerald's Jay Gatsby estate, was used as a main inspiration for Gatsby's home in the film.

The location used to film the exterior of Jay Gatsby's mansion was the college building of the International College of Management, Sydney. Some inspiration was also drawn from other Gold Coast, Long Island, mansions, including Oheka Castle and La Selva Mansion. Features evoking the Long Island mansions were added in post-production.

The inspiration for the film version of the Buchanan estate came from Old Westbury Gardens in Old Westbury, New York. The mansion exterior was built on a soundstage, with digital enhancements added. The interior sets for the Buchanan mansion were inspired by the style of Hollywood Regency.

The home of Nick Carraway was conceived as an intimate cottage, in contrast with the grandeur of the neighboring Gatsby mansion. Objects chosen adhered to a central theme of what the designers saw as classic Long Island. The architecture conjures American Arts and Crafts, with Gustav Stickley-type furnishings inside and an Adirondack-style swing out.

The opening scene was filmed from Rivendell Child, Adolescent and Family Unit in Concord, Sydney, only a few kilometers from Sydney 2000 Olympic Stadium.

==== Costumes ====
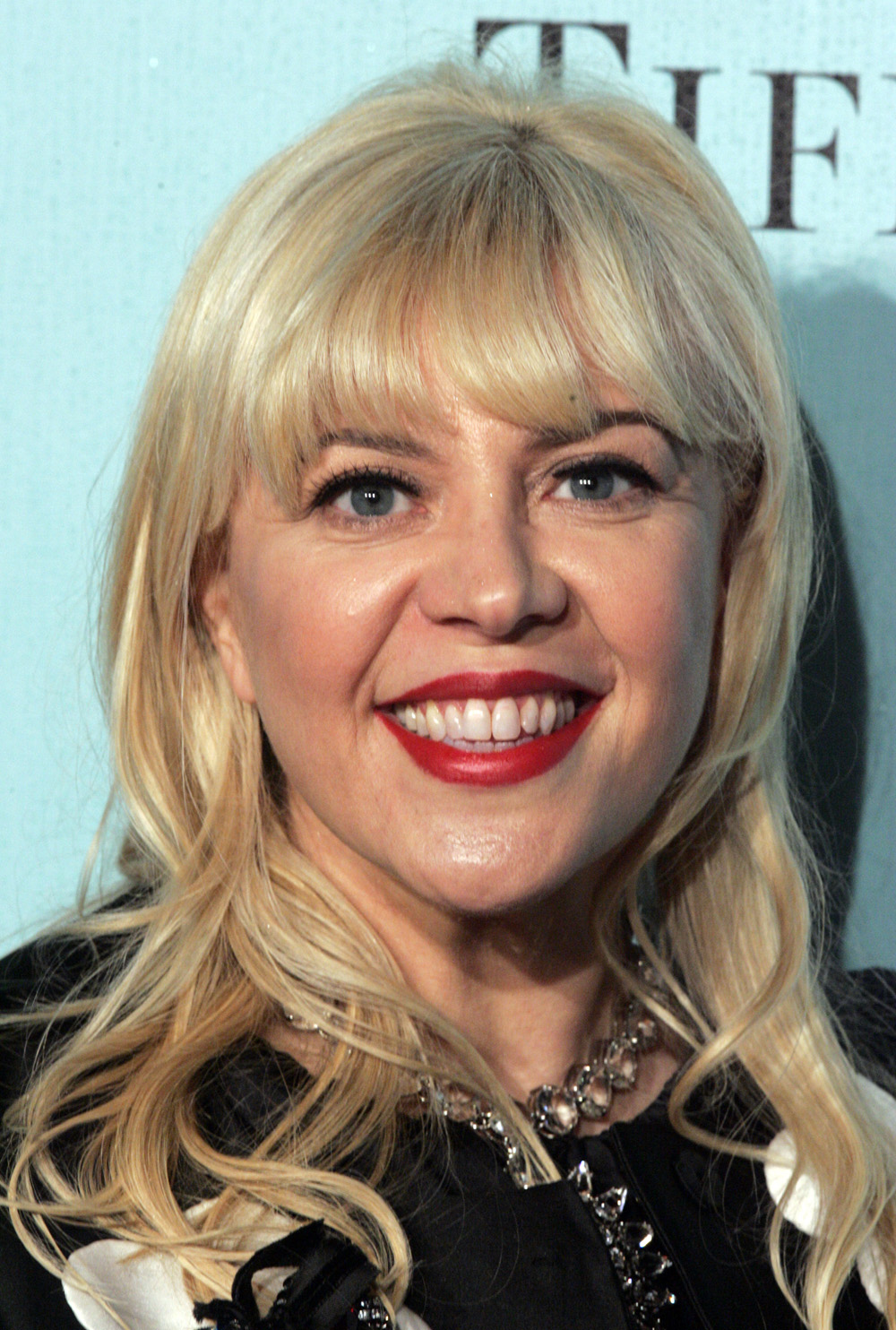
Catherine Martin designed the film's modernized costumes.

Costume designer Catherine Martin approached many apparel designers to craft the film's costumes. In conjunction with Miuccia Prada, Martin achieved the iconic 1920s look by altering pieces from the Prada and Miu Miu fashion archives. Many of the fashions from archives were concepts from runways and fashion magazines that were never worn by women in real life. Martin and Prada worked closely together to create pieces with "the European flair that was emerging amongst the aristocratic East Coast crowds in the Twenties". Martin worked with Brooks Brothers for the costumes worn by the male cast members and extras. Tiffany & Co. provided the jewelry for the film.

Costume historians, however, noted that the costumes were inauthentic as Martin and Prada modernized the 1920s-era fashions to resemble 2010s fashions. Most prominently, the women were clothed to emphasize their breasts, such as Daisy's push-up bra, in contrast to the flat-chested fashions of the era. Martin admitted that she took the styles of the 1920s and made them sexier for a modern audience. "If you look at the fashion illustrations, as opposed to what actually ended up being made, you will see that the '20s were all about sex," Martin stated in a Collector's Weekly interview. "It was the first time that women basically wore no undergarments and not even a [garter] belt."

Alice Jurow of the Art Deco Society observed that the film's highly stylized costume designs reflected contemporary audiences' inaccurate expectations and misconceptions of 1922 fashions. "When people say 'the Gatsby era,' there's definitely a mid-'20s concept that comes to mind, with the shorter skirts and the real archetypal flapper look," explained Jurow. "But 1922, it was the Jazz Age in terms of music, but the fashions hadn't quite caught up yet. The skirts were still mid-calf, even approaching ankle length. Clothes were a little more graceful and ornate and flowy. People would be startled and disturbed if anybody actually did real 1922 fashion in the production of Great Gatsby. It’s just not how we picture those characters."

== Release and marketing ==
Originally scheduled for a December 25, 2012 release, on August 6, 2012, it was reported that the film was being moved to a summer 2013 release date. In September 2012, this date was confirmed to be May 10, 2013. The film opened the 66th Cannes Film Festival on May 15, 2013, shortly following its wide release in RealD 3D and 2D formats.

The first trailer for The Great Gatsby was released on May 22, 2012, almost a year before the film's release. Songs featured in various trailers include: "No Church in the Wild" by Jay-Z and Kanye West; a cover of U2's "Love Is Blindness" performed by Jack White; a cover of The Turtles' "Happy Together" by the band Filter; a cover of Amy Winehouse's "Back to Black" performed by André 3000 and Beyoncé; "Young and Beautiful" performed by Lana Del Rey; and two songs, "Bedroom Hymns" and "Over the Love", performed by Florence and the Machine.

On April 15, 2013, Brooks Brothers premiered "The Gatsby Collection", a line of men's clothing, shoes and accessories "inspired by the costumes designed by Catherine Martin for Baz Luhrmann's The Great Gatsby". According to Fashion Weekly, "The looks weren't simply based on 1920s style: the new duds were designed based on the brand's actual archives [...] Brooks Brothers was one of the initial arbiters of Gatsby-era look. The actual costumes, designed by Catherine Martin, will be on display in select Brooks Brothers boutiques."

On April 17, 2013, Tiffany & Co. unveiled windows at its Fifth Avenue flagship store "inspired by" Luhrmann's film and created in collaboration with Luhrmann and costumer Catherine Martin. The jewelry store also premiered "The Great Gatsby Collection" line of jewelry designed in anticipation of the film. The collection comprises 7 pieces: a brooch, a headpiece (both reportedly based on archival Tiffany designs), a necklace and four different rings, including one in platinum with a 5.25-carat diamond, priced at US$875,000.

== Soundtrack ==
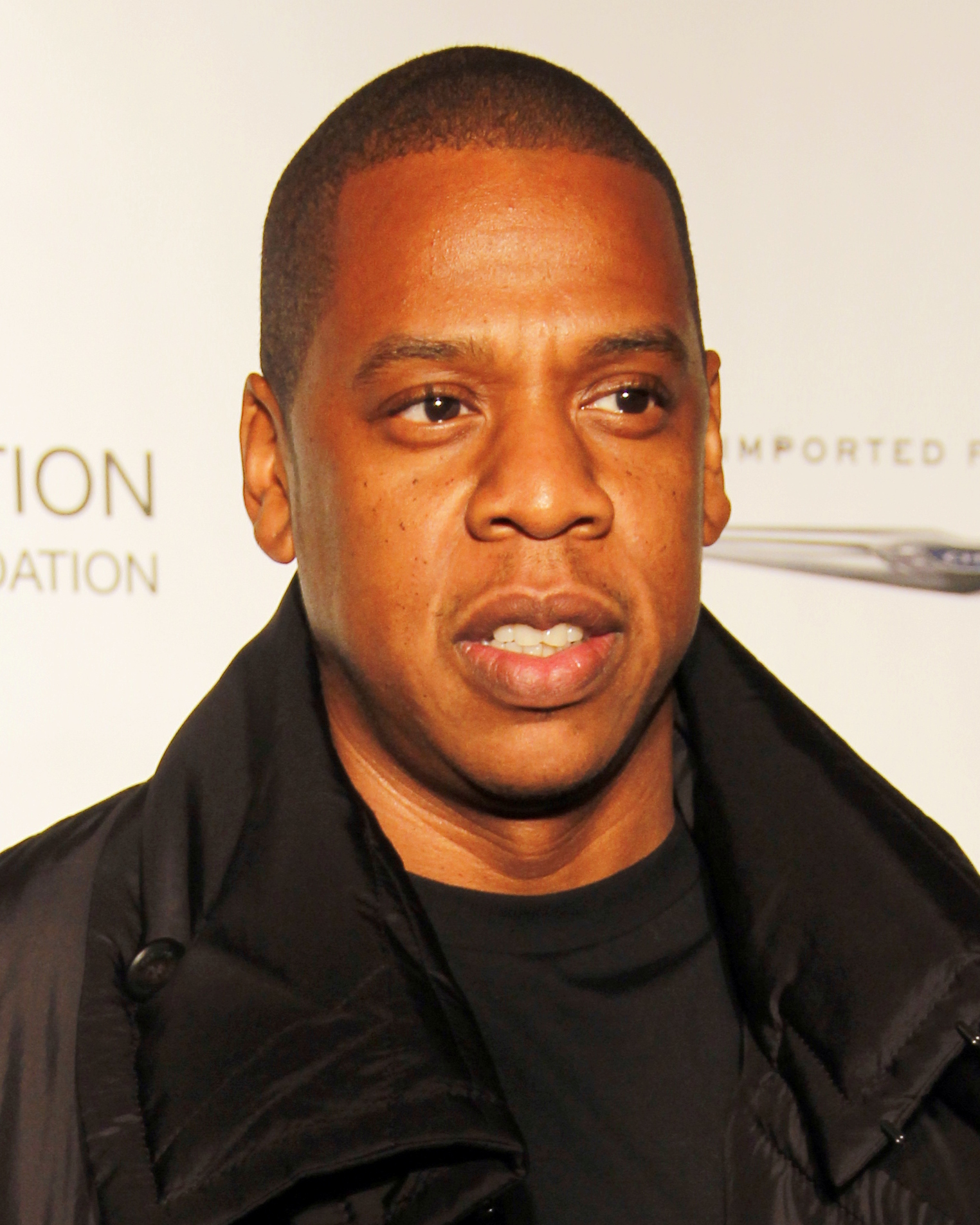
Jay-Z executive-produced the film's soundtrack.

Released on May 7, the film's soundtrack is also available in a deluxe edition; a Target exclusive release also features three extra tracks. The film's songs were executive-produced by Jay-Z and The Bullitts.

Penned by Lana Del Rey and the film's director, Baz Luhrmann, the song "Young and Beautiful" was released to contemporary hit radio as a single, and was used as the film's buzz single. A snippet of the track appeared in the official trailer for the film and played during the scene where the characters portrayed by Leonardo DiCaprio and Carey Mulligan express their romantic feelings for one another. Hip hop magazine Rap-Up called the single "haunting", while MTV called it "somber-sounding". The track performed by Florence and the Machine, "Over the Love", references the "green light" symbol from the novel in its lyrics. Chris Payne of Billboard praised Beyoncé and André 3000's cover of "Back to Black", made unique with a downtempo EDM wobble. The xx recorded "Together" for the film, with Jamie Smith telling MTV that the band's contribution to the soundtrack sounds like "despair", and revealing that it uses a 60-piece orchestra.

Speaking of his goals for the movie's musical backdrop, Baz Luhrmann expressed his desire to blend the music of the Jazz Age, associated with the 1922 setting of the story, with a modern spin. Much like his modern twists applied in Moulin Rouge! and Romeo + Juliet, Baz uses the movie's music not as a background, but instead prominently in the foreground, which takes on a character of its own.

== Reception ==
=== Box office ===
The Great Gatsby Grossed $144.8 million in North America, and $208.8 million in other countries, for a worldwide total of $353.6 million. Calculating in all expenses, Deadline Hollywood estimated that the film made a profit of $58.6 million.

In North America, The Great Gatsby earned US$19.4 million on its opening Friday, including US$3.25 million from Thursday night and midnight shows. It went on to finish in second place, behind Iron Man 3, during its opening weekend, with US$51.1 million. This was the sixth-largest opening weekend for a film that did not debut in first place, the second-largest opening weekend for a film starring Leonardo DiCaprio behind Inception, and Luhrmann's highest-grossing movie.

=== Critical response ===
On review aggregation website Rotten Tomatoes, the film has an approval rating of 49% based on 305 reviews, with an average rating of 6/10. The website's critical consensus reads, "While certainly ambitious—and every bit as visually dazzling as one might expect—Baz Luhrmann's The Great Gatsby emphasizes visual splendor at the expense of its source material's vibrant heart." Metacritic gives the film a score of 55 out of 100, based on reviews from 45 critics, indicating "mixed or average reviews". Audiences polled by the market research firm CinemaScore gave an average grade of "B" on an A+ to F scale.

Joe Morgenstern of The Wall Street Journal criticized the film as "a tale told idiotically, full of noise and furor, signifying next to nothing." Morgenstern felt the elaborate production designs were a misfire. He likened the film's flaws to the decadent era which Fitzgerald criticized in his writing and stated that what is "intractably wrong with the film is that there's no reality to heighten; it's a spectacle in search of a soul". The Chicago Reader review felt "Luhrmann is exactly the wrong person to adapt such a delicately rendered story, and his 3D feature plays like a ghastly Roaring 20s blowout at a sorority house". In The Atlantic, Christopher Orr observed that "the problem is that when the movie is entertaining it's not Gatsby, and when it's Gatsby it's not entertaining."

The positive reviews included A. O. Scott of The New York Times, who felt the adaptation was "a lot of fun" and "less a conventional movie adaptation than a splashy, trashy opera, a wayward, lavishly theatrical celebration of the emotional and material extravagance that Fitzgerald surveyed with fascinated ambivalence". Scott advised "the best way to enjoy the film is to put aside whatever literary agenda you are tempted to bring with you". Peter Rainer of Christian Science Monitor gave it a "C-", stating that "Fitzgerald's sensibility is delicately nuanced, but there's steel in his melancholy. With Luhrmann, everything, not just the parties but the intimate scenes, turns into Mardi Gras". Ty Burr of The Boston Globe reserved special praise for DiCaprio's performance, saying "magnificent is the only word to describe this performance—the best movie Gatsby by far, superhuman in his charm and connections, the host of revels beyond imagining, and at his heart an insecure fraud whose hopes are pinned to a woman".

The Scene Magazine gave the movie a "B−" rating, and praised the actors' performances, in particular saying that "the stand-out actor is Joel Edgerton as Tom Buchanan doing an excellent job of showing the character's gruffness, despite the one-dimensionality given to him". A granddaughter of Fitzgerald, Eleanor Lanahan, praised the style and music of the film.

Tobey Maguire's role as Nick received mixed reviews from critics, with Philip French of The Guardian calling him "miscast or misdirected". Ann Hornaday of The Washington Post wrote that "Tobey Maguire is his usual recessive presence, barely registering as either a dynamic part of the events he describes or their watchful witness", and Elizabeth Weitzman of The New York Daily News opined that, despite "the wry-observational skills needed for Nick's Midwestern decency", the character is "directed toward a wide-eyed, one-note performance". Rick Groen of The Globe and Mail was more positive of Maguire's character, saying "our narrator, [is] prone to his occasionally purple rhetoric. But that imposed conceit, the image of a talented depressive writing from inside the bauble of his imagination, seems to validate his inflated prose and, better yet, lets us re-appreciate its inherent poetry".

== Accolades ==
Awards
Award	Date of ceremony	Category	Recipients	Result
Academy Awards	March 2, 2014	Best Costume Design	Catherine Martin	Won
Academy Awards	March 2, 2014	Best Production Design	Catherine Martin (Art Direction); Beverley Dunn (Set Decoration)	Won
AACTA Awards	January 30, 2014	Best Film	Baz Luhrmann, Catherine Martin, Douglas Wick, Lucy Fisher, and Catherine Knapman	Won
AACTA Awards	January 30, 2014	Best Direction	Baz Luhrmann	Won
AACTA Awards	January 30, 2014	Best Adapted Screenplay	Baz Luhrmann and Craig Pearce	Won
AACTA Awards	January 30, 2014	Best Actor in a Leading Role	Leonardo DiCaprio	Won
AACTA Awards	January 30, 2014	Best Actress in a Leading Role	Carey Mulligan	Nominated
AACTA Awards	January 30, 2014	Best Actor in a Supporting Role	Joel Edgerton	Won
AACTA Awards	January 30, 2014	Best Actress in a Supporting Role	Elizabeth Debicki	Won
AACTA Awards	January 30, 2014	Best Actress in a Supporting Role	Isla Fisher	Nominated
AACTA Awards	January 30, 2014	Best Cinematography	Simon Duggan	Won
AACTA Awards	January 30, 2014	Best Editing	Matt Villa, Jason Ballantine, and Jonathan Redmond	Won
AACTA Awards	January 30, 2014	Best Original Music Score	Craig Armstrong	Won
AACTA Awards	January 30, 2014	Best Sound	Wayne Pashley, Jenny Ward, Fabian Sanjurjo, Steve Maslow, Phil Heywood, and Guntis Sics	Won
AACTA Awards	January 30, 2014	Best Production Design	Catherine Martin, Karen Murphy, Ian Gracie, and Beverley Dunn	Won
AACTA Awards	January 30, 2014	Best Costume Design	Catherine Martin, Silvana Azzi Heras, and Kerry Thompson	Won
AACTA Awards	January 10, 2014	Best International Supporting Actor	Joel Edgerton	Nominated
AACTA Awards	January 10, 2014	Best International Direction	Baz Luhrmann	Nominated
Art Directors Guild	February 8, 2014	Excellence in Production Design for a Period Film	Catherine Martin	Won
British Academy Film Awards	February 16, 2014	Best Costume Design	Catherine Martin	Won
British Academy Film Awards	February 16, 2014	Best Makeup and Hair	Maurizio Silvi and Kerry Warn	Nominated
British Academy Film Awards	February 16, 2014	Best Production Design	Catherine Martin and Beverley Dunn	Won
Costume Designers Guild	February 22, 2014	Excellence in Period Film	Catherine Martin	Nominated
Critics' Choice Movie Awards	January 16, 2014	Best Costume Design	Catherine Martin	Won
Critics' Choice Movie Awards	January 16, 2014	Best Production Design	Catherine Martin and Beverley Dunn	Won
Critics' Choice Movie Awards	January 16, 2014	Best Song	"Young and Beautiful" by Lana Del Rey	Nominated
Gay and Lesbian Entertainment Critics Association	January 21, 2014	Campy Flick of the Year	The Great Gatsby	Nominated
Gay and Lesbian Entertainment Critics Association	January 21, 2014	Visually Striking Film of the Year	The Great Gatsby	Nominated
Empire Awards	March 30, 2014	Best Female Newcomer	Elizabeth Debicki	Nominated
Golden Eagle Award	January 29, 2014	Best Foreign Language Film	The Great Gatsby	Nominated
Grammy Awards	January 26, 2014	Best Compilation Soundtrack for Visual Media	Baz Luhrmann	Nominated
Grammy Awards	January 26, 2014	Best Song Written for Visual Media	"Young and Beautiful"; Music by Lana Del Rey and Rick Nowels, Lyrics by Lana Del Rey	Nominated
Grammy Awards	January 26, 2014	Best Score Soundtrack for Visual Media	Craig Armstrong	Nominated
International 3D Society's Creative Arts Awards	January 28, 2014	Outstanding Live Action 3D Feature Film	The Great Gatsby	Nominated
Motion Picture Sound Editors Golden Reel Awards	February 16, 2014	Best Sound Editing: Music Score in a Feature Film	Jason Ruder and Tim Ryan	Won
Satellite Awards	February 23, 2014	Best Art Direction and Production Design	Catherine Martin (Art Direction); Beverley Dunn (Set Decoration)	Won
Satellite Awards	February 23, 2014	Best Costume Design	Catherine Martin	Nominated
Satellite Awards	February 23, 2014	Best Original Song	"Young and Beautiful"; Music by Lana Del Rey and Rick Nowels, Lyrics by Lana Del Rey	Won
St. Louis Gateway Film Critics Association	December 14, 2013	Best Art Direction	The Great Gatsby	Won
St. Louis Gateway Film Critics Association	December 14, 2013	Best Cinematography	Simon Duggan	Nominated
St. Louis Gateway Film Critics Association	December 14, 2013	Best Soundtrack	The Great Gatsby	Nominated
Visual Effects Society Awards	February 12, 2014	Outstanding Supporting Visual Effects in a Feature Motion Picture	Chris Godfrey, Prue Fletcher, and Joyce Cox	Nominated
Washington D.C. Area Film Critics Association	December 9, 2013	Best Director	Baz Luhrmann	Nominated
Washington D.C. Area Film Critics Association	December 9, 2013	Best Art Direction	Catherine Martin and Beverley Dunn	Won
Washington D.C. Area Film Critics Association	December 9, 2013	Best Cinematography	Simon Duggan	Nominated
Young Artist Awards	May 4, 2014	Best Supporting Young Actor in a Feature Film	Callan McAuliffe	Won

=== Meme ===
A still image from the film showing Leonardo DiCaprio as Gatsby lifting his glass in a toast gesture became a popular image macro internet meme.

== See also ==
Other theatrical film adaptations of The Great Gatsby include:

- The Great Gatsby (1926 film), starring Warner Baxter and Lois Wilson
- The Great Gatsby (1949 film), starring Alan Ladd and Betty Field
- The Great Gatsby (1974 film), starring Robert Redford and Mia Farrow
