= Strictly Come Dancing series 23 =

Strictly Come Dancing
- Series 23
- Presented by: Tess Daly; Claudia Winkleman
- Judges: Shirley Ballas; Anton Du Beke; Motsi Mabuse; Craig Revel Horwood
- Celebrity winner: Karen Carney
- Professional winner: Carlos Gu
- No. of episodes: 25

Release
- Original network: BBC One
- Original release: 20 September – 20 December 2025

Series chronology
- ← Previous; Series 22 Next → Series 24

Strictly Come Dancing returned for its twenty-third series with a launch show on 20 September 2025 on BBC One, with live shows beginning from 27 September. Tess Daly and Claudia Winkleman returned as hosts, whilst Janette Manrara and Fleur East returned to host Strictly Come Dancing: It Takes Two. Craig Revel Horwood, Motsi Mabuse, Shirley Ballas and Anton Du Beke returned to the judging panel. It was the last series to be presented by Daly and Winkleman, who announced their departures on 23 October 2025.

The series concluded on 20 December 2025, when footballer Karen Carney and her partner Carlos Gu were announced as the winners, with Amber Davies and Nikita Kuzmin, and George Clarke and Alexis Warr finishing as the runners-up.

== Format ==
Hosts and Judges for Strictly Come Dancing series 23

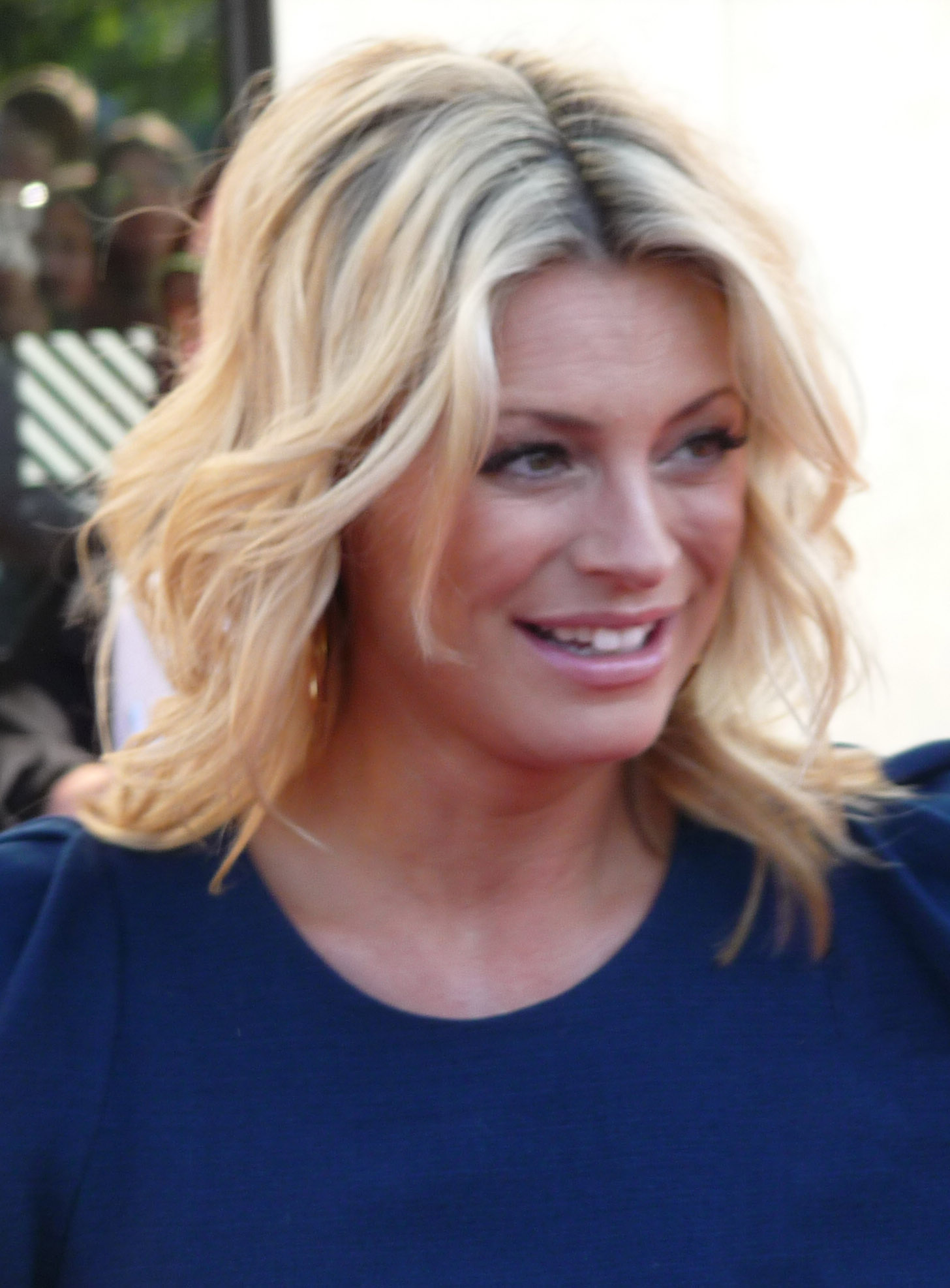
Tess Daly

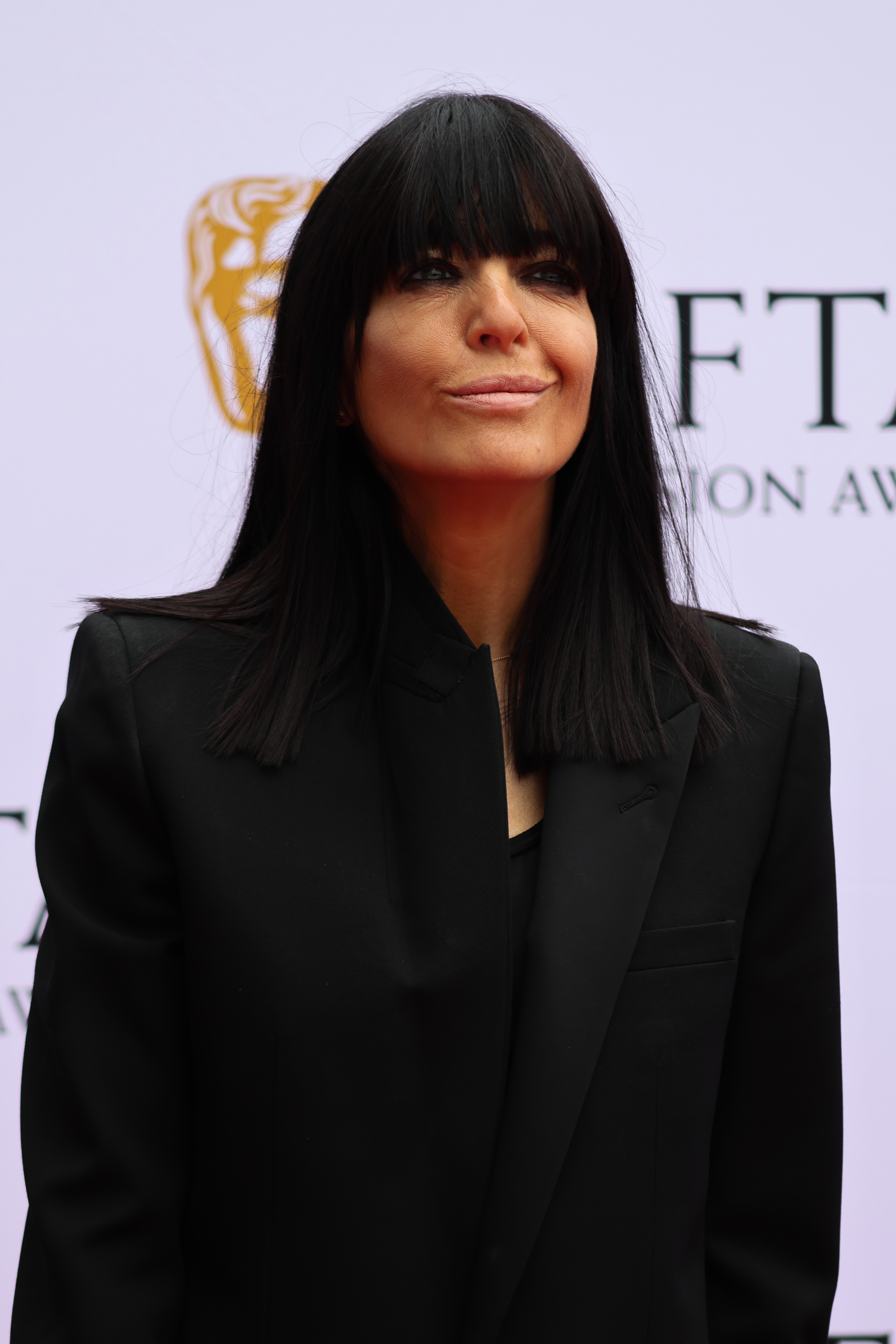
Claudia Winkleman

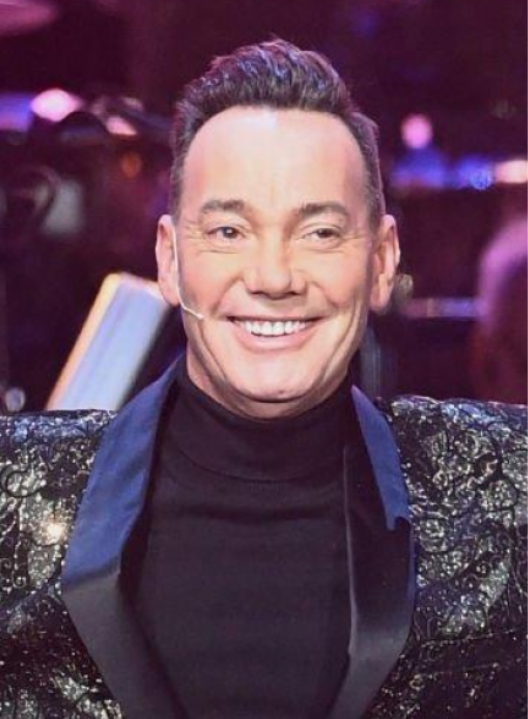
Craig Revel Horwood

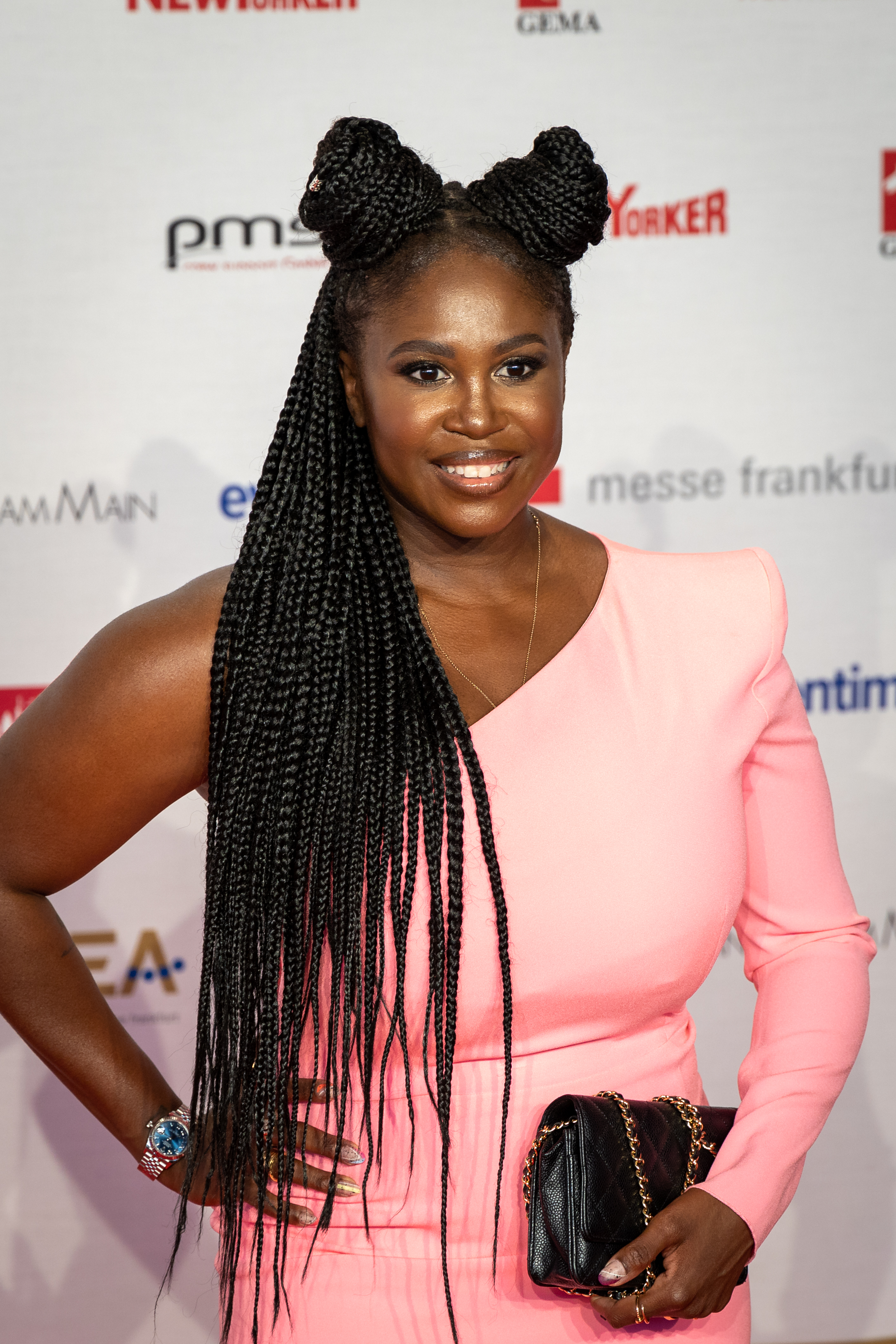
Motsi Mabuse

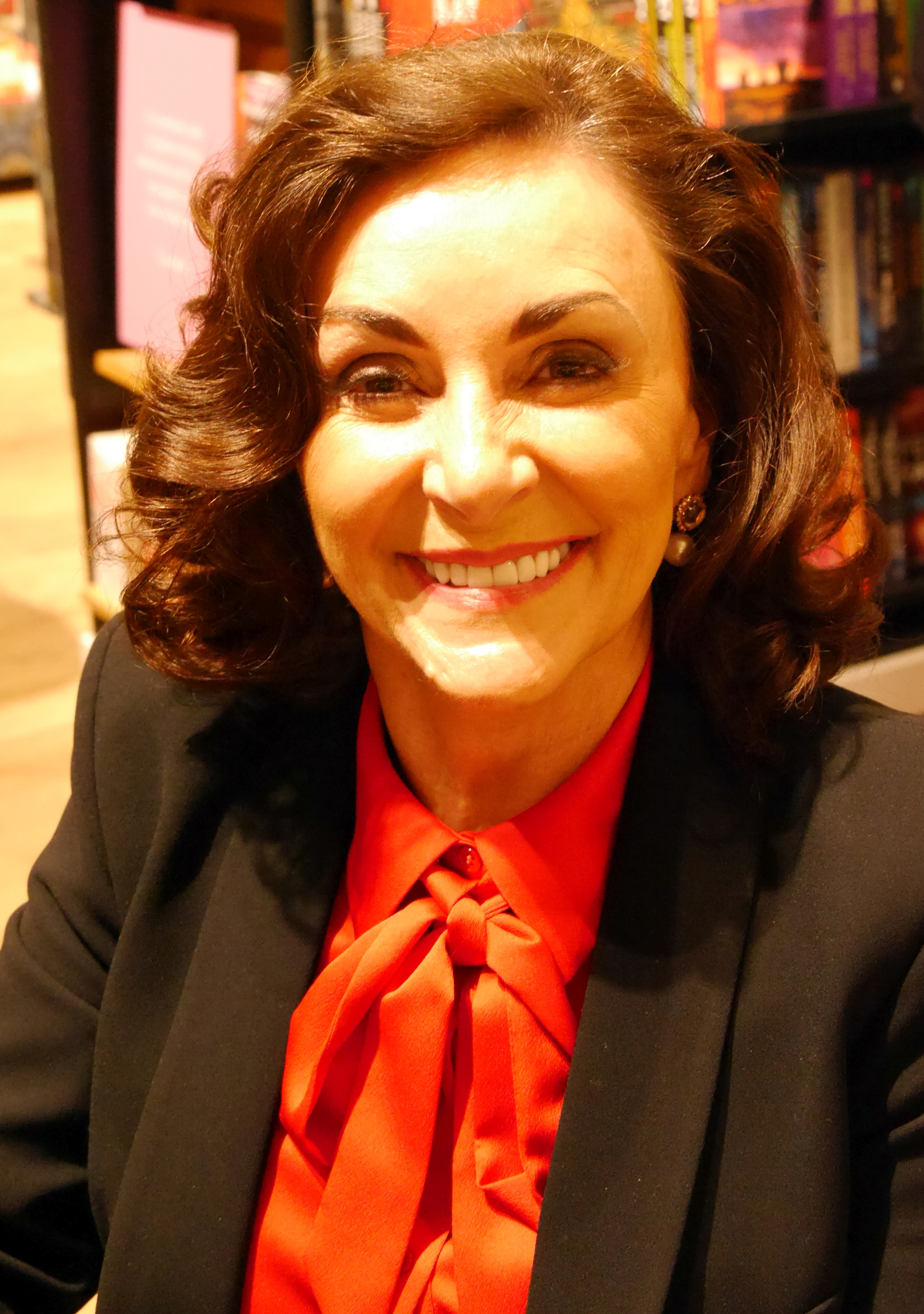
Shirley Ballas

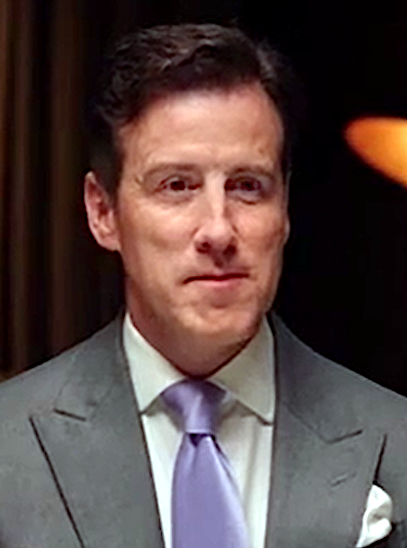
Anton Du Beke

The couples dance each week in a live show. The judges score each performance out of ten. After all the couples have danced they are then ranked according to the judges' scores and given points according to their rank, with the highest ranked couple receiving a number of points equal to the number of couples dancing that week e.g. 7 points where there are 7 couples dancing. When there are no tied scores the lowest scored couple will receive one point. However, in the event of a tie where two or more couples obtain the same judges score, the couple below those in the tie will be awarded one point below the points awarded to each of the tied couples. So, for example, if two couples obtain the same rank and obtain 7 points each, the couple immediately below them will be awarded 6 points. When couples are ranked equally by the judges the scoring of all other couples underneath will follow in the same descending order. Should there be any tied scores the lowest scored couple will therefore receive more than one point from the judges scores. The public are also invited to vote for their favourite couples, and the couples are ranked again according to the number of votes they receive, again receiving points; The couple with the most votes receiving the most points. Again in the unlikely event of a tie in the public vote the points are awarded in the same way as the points from the judges score.

The points for judges' score and public vote are then added together, and the two couples with the fewest points are placed in the bottom two. If two couples have equal points, the points from the public vote are given precedence. As with the previous series, the bottom two couples have to perform a dance-off on the results show. Based on that performance alone, each judge then votes on which couple should stay and which couple should leave. For the first time in the show's history, the casting vote was not made solely by the head judge in the dance-off and was instead rotated, with a different judge making the decision each week.

== Professional dancers ==
In April 2025, the BBC announced that all the professional dancers from the previous series; Dianne Buswell, Nadiya Bychkova, Amy Dowden, Karen Hauer, Katya Jones, Neil Jones, Nikita Kuzmin, Gorka Márquez, Luba Mushtuk, Jowita Przystał, Johannes Radebe, Aljaž Škorjanec, Kai Widdrington, Nancy Xu, Carlos Gu, Lauren Oakley, Michelle Tsiakkas and Vito Coppola; would be returning to this series. On 27 July, the BBC announced that two new professional dancers, Alexis Warr and Julian Caillon, would join the series. Warr won the seventeenth season of So You Think You Can Dance and was a troupe member on the American version of Dancing with the Stars. Caillon appeared as a professional dancer on three series of the Australian version of Dancing with the Stars.

During the launch show, Julian Caillon and Alexis Warr received a celebrity partner for the first time, while Neil Jones, Gorka Márquez, Luba Mushtuk, Michelle Tsiakkas and Nancy Xu did not receive a partner. The rest of the pros were paired to a celebrity.

== Couples ==
On 11 August 2025, Harry Aikines-Aryeetey was announced as the first contestant to be competing in the series on Newsround. Dani Dyer, Alex Kingston and Jimmy Floyd Hasselbaink were subsequently confirmed later that evening on The One Show. The celebrities continued to be revealed until 15 August 2025, when the full line-up was announced. Game of Thrones actor and DJ Kristian Nairn was initially announced as the final celebrity to be competing in the series, however on 21 August 2025, he withdrew from the competition due to health reasons. Former Emmerdale actor Lewis Cope was subsequently announced as his replacement on The One Show later that evening. On 23 September 2025, Love Island winner and actress Dani Dyer, who was initially announced as a contestant and was paired up with Nikita Kuzmin during the launch show, was announced to be withdrawing from the series after fracturing her ankle during training, Love Island winner and West End actress Amber Davies was announced as her replacement on 26 September, and began training with Kuzmin ahead of the first live show the following evening.

Celebrity	Notability	Professional partner	Status
Thomas Skinner	The Apprentice contestant & businessman	Amy Dowden	Eliminated 1st on 5 October 2025
Ross King	Television presenter	Jowita Przystał	Eliminated 2nd on 12 October 2025
Chris Robshaw	England rugby player	Nadiya Bychkova	Eliminated 3rd on 19 October 2025
Stefan Dennis	Neighbours actor & singer	Dianne Buswell	Withdrew on 20 October 2025
Jimmy Floyd Hasselbaink	Netherlands footballer & manager	Lauren Oakley	Eliminated 4th on 26 October 2025
Ellie Goldstein	Model & Malory Towers actress	Vito Coppola	Eliminated 5th on 2 November 2025
Harry Aikines-Aryeetey	Olympic sprinter & Gladiators star	Karen Hauer	Eliminated 6th on 9 November 2025
Vicky Pattison	Television personality	Kai Widdrington	Eliminated 7th on 16 November 2025
La Voix	Drag queen & RuPaul's Drag Race UK finalist	Aljaž Škorjanec	Withdrew on 22 November 2025
Alex Kingston	Stage & screen actress	Johannes Radebe	Eliminated 8th on 30 November 2025
Lewis Cope	Emmerdale actor	Katya Jones	Eliminated 9th on 7 December 2025
Balvinder Sopal	EastEnders actress	Julian Caillon	Eliminated 10th on 14 December 2025
George Clarke	Social media personality & podcaster	Alexis Warr	Runners-up on 20 December 2025
Amber Davies	Love Island winner & West End actress	Nikita Kuzmin	Runners-up on 20 December 2025
Karen Carney	England footballer & pundit	Carlos Gu	Winners on 20 December 2025

== Scoring chart ==
The highest score each week is indicated in bold green with a dagger (†), while the lowest score each week is indicated in italicized red with a double-dagger (‡).

Color key:

Winners
Co-runners-up
Bottom two
Excused from competition for the week
Withdrew
Eliminated

Strictly Come Dancing series 23 - Weekly scores
Couple	Pl.	Week														
Couple	Pl.	1	2	1+2	3	4	5	6	7	8	9	10	9+10	11	12	13
Karen & Carlos	1st	**31**†	20	51	25	27	28	38	35	31	39	40+1=41	80	34‡	39+39=**78**†	40+37+40=117‡
Amber & Nikita	2nd	27	29	**56**†	35	33	33	35	38	**38**†	36	40+4=**44**†	80	**40**†	37+40=77	39+39+40=**118**†
George & Alexis	2nd	24	30	54	31	30	27‡	29	34	29	39	34+2=36	75	35	35+37=72	39+39+39=117‡
Balvinder & Julian	4th	17	30	47	26	28	28	28	34	27‡	33‡	28+5=33	66	35	35+35=70‡	
Lewis & Katya	5th	28	27	55	**37**†	34	**34**†	**40**†	35	37	**40**†	36+6=42	**82**†	35		
Alex & Johannes	6th	21	**31**†	52	30	**36**†	32	35	30	35	35	23+3=26‡	61‡			
La Voix & Aljaž	7th	24	19	43	28	14‡	28	35	29‡	33						
Vicky & Kai	8th	23	24	47	25	29	33	31	**39**†	27‡						
Harry & Karen	9th	19	26	45	32	26	30	26‡	30							
Ellie & Vito	10th	17	23	40	27	31	28	27								
Jimmy & Lauren	11th	27	25	52	28	29	30									
Stefan & Dianne	12th	22	17	39		26										
Chris & Nadiya	13th	14	16	30	22	24										
Ross & Jowita	14th	10‡	15	25‡	19‡											
Thomas & Amy	15th	16	13‡	29												

=== Average chart ===
This table only counts for dances scored on a 40-points scale. The extra points for the Instant Dance are not included.

Couple	Rank by average	Total points	Number of dances	Total average
Amber & Nikita	1st	579	16	36.2
Lewis & Katya	2nd	383	11	34.8
Karen & Carlos	3rd	543	16	33.9
George & Alexis	4th	531	16	33.2
Alex & Johannes	5th	308	10	30.8
Balvinder & Julian	6th	384	13	29.5
Vicky & Kai	7th	231	8	28.9
Jimmy & Lauren	8th	139	5	27.8
Harry & Karen	9th	189	7	27.0
La Voix & Aljaž	10th	210	8	26.3
Ellie & Vito	11th	153	6	25.5
Stefan & Dianne	12th	65	3	21.7
Chris & Nadiya	13th	76	4	19.0
Ross & Jowita	14th	44	3	14.7
Thomas & Amy	15th	29	2	14.5

== Weekly scores ==
Unless indicated otherwise, individual judges scores in the charts below (given in parentheses) are listed in this order from left to right: Craig Revel Horwood, Motsi Mabuse, Shirley Ballas, Anton Du Beke.

=== Launch show ===
- Musical guest: Jessie J — "Living My Best Life"

=== Week 1 ===
Each couple performed one unlearned dance. There was no elimination this week; all scores carried over to the following week.

Couples are listed in the order they performed.

Couple	Scores	Dance	Music
Chris & Nadiya	14 (3, 4, 3, 4)	Samba	"Unbelievable" — EMF
Alex & Johannes	21 (4, 6, 5, 6)	Viennese waltz	"Cry Me a River" — Michael Bublé
Harry & Karen	19 (4, 5, 5, 5)	Cha-cha-cha	"Push It" — Salt-N-Pepa
Stefan & Dianne	22 (4, 6, 6, 6)	Foxtrot	"Neighbours Theme" — Barry Crocker
Ellie & Vito	17 (4, 4, 4, 5)	Cha-cha-cha	"Yes, And?" — Ariana Grande / "Vogue" — Madonna
Lewis & Katya	28 (7, 7, 7, 7)	Jive	"Get Ready" — The Temptations
Ross & Jowita	10 (2, 3, 2, 3)	Cha-cha-cha	"California Gurls" — Katy Perry
George & Alexis	24 (6, 6, 6, 6)	American Smooth	"Stargazing" — Myles Smith
Vicky & Kai	23 (5, 6, 6, 6)	Cha-cha-cha	"Best of My Love" — Ella Eyre
Jimmy & Lauren	27 (6, 7, 7, 7)	Quickstep	"Chelsea Dagger" — The Fratellis
Balvinder & Julian	17 (4, 4, 4, 5)	Samba	"(Shake, Shake, Shake) Shake Your Booty" — KC and the Sunshine Band
La Voix & Aljaž	24 (6, 6, 6, 6)	American Smooth	"Pink Pony Club" — Chappell Roan
Thomas & Amy	16 (2, 4, 5, 5)	Paso doble	"Battle Without Honor or Humanity" — Hotei
Amber & Nikita	27 (7, 7, 7, 6)	Waltz	"When We Were Young" — Adele
Karen & Carlos	31 (7, 8, 8, 8)	Jive	"One Way or Another" — Blondie

=== Week 2 ===
- Musical guest: Zara Larsson — "Midnight Sun"

Each couple performed one unlearned dance. Motsi Mabuse had the casting vote this week.

Couples are listed in the order they performed.

Couple	Scores	Dance	Music	Result
La Voix & Aljaž	19 (4, 5, 5, 5)	Jive	"Objection (Tango)" — Shakira	Safe
Karen & Carlos	20 (4, 5, 5, 6)	Tango	"Training Season" — Dua Lipa	Safe
Jimmy & Lauren	25 (6, 6, 6, 7)	Cha-cha-cha	"I Heard It Through the Grapevine" — Santa Esmeralda	Safe
Lewis & Katya	27 (7, 7, 6, 7)	Viennese waltz	"Lose Control" — Teddy Swims	Safe
Alex & Johannes	31 (7, 8, 8, 8)	Samba	"La Bamba" — Connie Francis	Safe
Ellie & Vito	23 (5, 6, 6, 6)	Waltz	"Your Song" — Ellie Goulding	Safe
Thomas & Amy	13 (2, 3, 4, 4)	Salsa	"Bonkers" — Dizzee Rascal & Armand van Helden	Eliminated
Harry & Karen	26 (6, 7, 6, 7)	Quickstep	"Everybody Needs Somebody to Love" — The Blues Brothers	Safe
Ross & Jowita	15 (2, 4, 4, 5)	Waltz	"Sunshine on Leith" — The Proclaimers	Safe
Amber & Nikita	29 (8, 7, 7, 7)	Samba	"Bam Bam" — Camila Cabello feat. Ed Sheeran	Safe
Vicky & Kai	24 (6, 6, 6, 6)	Foxtrot	"Rein Me In" — Sam Fender & Olivia Dean	Safe
Chris & Nadiya	16 (3, 4, 4, 5)	Viennese waltz	"Die with a Smile" — Lady Gaga & Bruno Mars	Bottom two
Stefan & Dianne	17 (4, 4, 4, 5)	Cha-cha-cha	"Give It Up" — KC and the Sunshine Band	Safe
George & Alexis	30 (7, 7, 8, 8)	Paso doble	"Game of Survival" — Ruelle	Safe
Balvinder & Julian	30 (7, 8, 8, 7)	Charleston	"Been Like This" — Meghan Trainor & T-Pain	Safe

Judges' votes to save

- Ballas: Chris & Nadiya
- Du Beke: Chris & Nadiya
- Horwood: Chris & Nadiya
- Mabuse: Did not vote, but would have voted to save Chris & Nadiya

=== Week 3: Movie Week ===
- Musical guest: Lang Lang — "Reflection" (from Mulan)

Each couple performed one unlearned dance to famous film songs. Shirley Ballas had the casting vote this week.

Stage and screen star Cynthia Erivo mentored the couples and provided comments alongside the judges, but did not score the routines.

Stefan and Dianne, who were due to dance a Waltz to "It Is You (I Have Loved)" from the movie Shrek, announced that they would be unable to perform on the live show due to Stefan's illness. Under the rules of the show, they were granted a bye to the following week.

Couples are listed in the order they performed.

Couple	Scores	Dance	Music	Film	Result
Amber & Nikita	35 (8, 9, 9, 9)	American Smooth	"Sixteen Going on Seventeen"	The Sound of Music	Safe
Chris & Nadiya	22 (4, 6, 6, 6)	Paso doble	"Sweet Child o' Mine"	Thor: Love and Thunder	Safe
George & Alexis	31 (6, 8, 9, 8)	Couple's choice	"Soda Pop"	KPop Demon Hunters	Safe
La Voix & Aljaž	28 (7, 7, 7, 7)	Waltz	"Feed the Birds (Tuppence a Bag)"	Mary Poppins	Safe
Ross & Jowita	19 (4, 5, 5, 5)	Paso doble	"Thunderbirds Theme"	Thunderbirds	Eliminated
Balvinder & Julian	26 (7, 7, 6, 6)	Foxtrot	"The Way You Look Tonight"	Swing Time	Bottom two
Karen & Carlos	25 (4, 7, 7, 7)	Cha-cha-cha	"She's a Lady"	Miss Congeniality	Safe
Jimmy & Lauren	28 (7, 7, 6, 8)	Rumba	"No Time to Die"	No Time to Die	Safe
Vicky & Kai	25 (5, 7, 6, 7)	Charleston	"A Little Party Never Killed Nobody"	The Great Gatsby	Safe
Ellie & Vito	27 (6, 7, 7, 7)	Samba	"Dance the Night"	Barbie	Safe
Alex & Johannes	30 (7, 8, 7, 8)	Quickstep	"Suddenly I See"	The Devil Wears Prada	Safe
Harry & Karen	32 (8, 8, 8, 8)	Salsa	"I Always Wanted a Brother"	Mufasa: The Lion King	Safe
Lewis & Katya	37 (9, 10, 9, 9)	Paso doble	"The Plaza of Execution"	The Mask of Zorro	Safe

Judges' votes to save

- Du Beke: Balvinder & Julian
- Horwood: Balvinder & Julian
- Mabuse: Balvinder & Julian
- Ballas: Did not vote, but would have voted to save Balvinder & Julian

=== Week 4 ===
- Musical guest: Leigh-Anne Pinnock — "Been a Minute"

Each couple performed one unlearned dance. Craig Revel Horwood had the casting vote this week.

Couples are listed in the order they performed.

Couple	Scores	Dance	Music	Result
Karen & Carlos	27 (6, 7, 7, 7)	Quickstep	"Marvellous Party" — Beverley Knight	Safe
Harry & Karen	26 (6, 7, 6, 7)	Rumba	"It Must Have Been Love" — Roxette	Safe
Vicky & Kai	29 (7, 7, 7, 8)	Samba	"La Isla Bonita" — Madonna	Safe
Stefan & Dianne	26 (5, 7, 7, 7)	Charleston	"Dance Monkey" — Tones and I	Safe
Lewis & Katya	34 (8, 9, 9, 8)	Foxtrot	"L-O-V-E" — Nat King Cole	Safe
Jimmy & Lauren	29 (6, 8, 7, 8)	Couple's choice	"Rock It" — Merchant / "Follow the Leader" — The Soca Boys	Safe
George & Alexis	30 (7, 8, 7, 8)	Tango	"Viva la Vida" — Coldplay	Safe
La Voix & Aljaž	14 (3, 4, 2, 5)	Cha-cha-cha	"Hit Me with Your Best Shot" — Pat Benatar	Safe
Balvinder & Julian	28 (7, 7, 7, 7)	Paso doble	"Diablo Rojo" — Rodrigo y Gabriela	Bottom two
Alex & Johannes	36 (8, 9, 10, 9)	Rumba	"Fast Car" — Tracy Chapman	Safe
Chris & Nadiya	24 (4, 6, 7, 7)	Salsa	"María" — Ricky Martin	Eliminated
Amber & Nikita	33 (8, 9, 8, 8)	Argentine tango	"Angel of My Dreams" — JADE	Safe
Ellie & Vito	31 (7, 8, 8, 8)	Couple's choice	"Golden" — Huntr/x	Safe

Judges' votes to save

- Mabuse: Balvinder & Julian
- Ballas: Chris & Nadiya
- Du Beke: Chris & Nadiya
- Horwood: Balvinder & Julian

=== Week 5: Icons Week ===
- Musical guest: Rachel Zegler — "Don't Cry for Me Argentina"

Each couple performed one unlearned dance to a song by a popular musical icon, with the celebrity appearing in the guise of their icon. Anton Du Beke had the casting vote this week.

Stefan Dennis and Dianne Buswell were forced to withdraw from the competition on 20 October as Dennis had torn his calf muscle during their performance the previous Saturday. Dennis was due to dance as Jon Bon Jovi to Bon Jovi's "Livin' on a Prayer".

Couples are listed in the order they performed.

Couple	Scores	Dance	Music	Icon	Result
Lewis & Katya	34 (9, 9, 8, 8)	Quickstep	"Ring of Fire"	Johnny Cash	Safe
Karen & Carlos	28 (7, 7, 7, 7)	Rumba	"Think Twice"	Celine Dion	Safe
Ellie & Vito	28 (6, 8, 7, 7)	Salsa	"Wannabe", "Who Do You Think You Are" & "Spice Up Your Life" — Spice Girls	Emma Bunton	Safe
Alex & Johannes	32 (7, 8, 8, 9)	Foxtrot	"Here You Come Again"	Dolly Parton	Safe
George & Alexis	27 (6, 7, 6, 8)	Jive	"As It Was"	Harry Styles	Safe
Vicky & Kai	33 (8, 8, 8, 9)	Couple's choice	"Fight for This Love"	Cheryl	Safe
Balvinder & Julian	28 (7, 7, 7, 7)	Quickstep	"Texas Hold 'Em"	Beyoncé	Safe
Harry & Karen	30 (6, 9, 7, 8)	Argentine tango	"Caught Up"	Usher	Safe
Amber & Nikita	33 (8, 8, 8, 9)	Cha-cha-cha	"Break Free"	Ariana Grande	Bottom two
Jimmy & Lauren	30 (7, 8, 7, 8)	American Smooth	"Purple Rain"	Prince	Eliminated
La Voix & Aljaž	28 (6, 7, 7, 8)	Salsa	"Strong Enough"	Cher	Safe

Judges' votes to save

- Horwood: Amber & Nikita
- Mabuse: Amber & Nikita
- Ballas: Amber & Nikita
- Du Beke: Did not vote, but would have voted to save Amber & Nikita

=== Week 6: Halloween Week ===
- Musical guest: Cat Burns — "How To Be Human"

Each couple performed one unlearned dance to Halloween themes. Shirley Ballas had the casting vote this week.

Couples are listed in the order they performed.

Couple	Scores	Dance	Music	Result
Vicky & Kai	31 (7, 8, 8, 8)	American Smooth	"Total Eclipse of the Heart" — Bonnie Tyler	Safe
Ellie & Vito	27 (6, 7, 7, 7)	Tango	"Abracadabra" — Lady Gaga	Eliminated
George & Alexis	29 (6, 7, 8, 8)	Cha-cha-cha	"Apple" — Charli XCX	Safe
La Voix & Aljaž	35 (8, 9, 9, 9)	Paso doble	"The 5th" — Ludwig van Beethoven	Safe
Lewis & Katya	40 (10, 10, 10, 10)	Couple's choice	"Creep" — Radiohead	Safe
Balvinder & Julian	28 (7, 7, 7, 7)	Rumba	"Stay" — Shakespears Sister	Bottom two
Harry & Karen	26 (6, 7, 6, 7)	American Smooth	"Mystical Magical" — Benson Boone	Safe
Karen & Carlos	38 (9, 10, 9, 10)	Argentine tango	"Red Right Hand" — Nick Cave and the Bad Seeds	Safe
Alex & Johannes	35 (8, 9, 9, 9)	Salsa	"Horny" — Mousse T. vs. Hot 'n' Juicy	Safe
Amber & Nikita	35 (9, 9, 8, 9)	Viennese waltz	"I See Red" — Everybody Loves an Outlaw	Safe

Judges' votes to save

- Du Beke: Balvinder & Julian
- Horwood: Balvinder & Julian
- Mabuse: Balvinder & Julian
- Ballas: Did not vote, but would have voted to save Balvinder & Julian

=== Week 7 ===
- Musical guest: James Morrison — "Fight Another Day"

Each couple performed one unlearned dance. Motsi Mabuse had the casting vote this week.

Couples are listed in the order they performed.

Couple	Scores	Dance	Music	Result
Lewis & Katya	35 (8, 9, 9, 9)	Cha-cha-cha	"I Like It Like That" — Pete Rodriguez	Safe
Karen & Carlos	35 (8, 10, 8, 9)	Charleston	"Upside Down" — Diana Ross / "Think" — Aretha Franklin	Safe
Alex & Johannes	30 (7, 8, 7, 8)	Paso doble	"Amparito Roca" — Jaime Teixidor	Safe
La Voix & Aljaž	29 (6, 8, 7, 8)	Foxtrot	"Make Your Own Kind of Music" — Cass Elliot	Bottom two
Balvinder & Julian	34 (7, 9, 9, 9)	Couple's choice	"Sapphire" — Ed Sheeran feat. Arijit Singh	Safe
George & Alexis	34 (8, 8, 9, 9)	Viennese waltz	"Somebody to Love" — Queen	Safe
Amber & Nikita	38 (9, 10, 9, 10)	Salsa	"You Make Me Feel (Mighty Real)" — Sylvester	Safe
Vicky & Kai	39 (9, 10, 10, 10)	Tango	"The Fate of Ophelia" — Taylor Swift	Safe
Harry & Karen	30 (7, 8, 7, 8)	Samba	"Samba" — Gloria Estefan	Eliminated

Judges' votes to save

- Ballas: La Voix & Aljaž
- Du Beke: La Voix & Aljaž
- Horwood: La Voix & Aljaž
- Mabuse: Did not vote, but would have voted to save La Voix & Aljaž

=== Week 8 ===
- Musical guest: Olly Murs — "Run This Town"

Each couple performed one unlearned dance. Craig Revel Horwood had the casting vote this week.

Couples are listed in the order they performed.

Couple	Scores	Dance	Music	Result
Balvinder & Julian	27 (6, 7, 7, 7)	American Smooth	"My Guy" — Mary Wells	Bottom two
Amber & Nikita	38 (9, 10, 9, 10)	Paso doble	"Dream On" — Aerosmith	Safe
Alex & Johannes	35 (8, 9, 9, 9)	Waltz	"Weekend in New England" — Barry Manilow	Safe
Vicky & Kai	27 (6, 7, 7, 7)	Jive	"Sound of the Underground" — Girls Aloud	Eliminated
Karen & Carlos	31 (7, 8, 8, 8)	American Smooth	"You Don't Own Me" — Saygrace	Safe
George & Alexis	29 (6, 7, 8, 8)	Rumba	"Somewhere Only We Know" — Lily Allen	Safe
Lewis & Katya	37 (9, 10, 9, 9)	Tango	"12 to 12" — Sombr	Safe
La Voix & Aljaž	33 (7, 8, 9, 9)	Couple's choice	"Don't Rain on My Parade" — Barbra Streisand	Safe

Judges' votes to save

- Mabuse: Balvinder & Julian
- Ballas: Balvinder & Julian
- Du Beke: Balvinder & Julian
- Horwood: Did not vote, but would have voted to save Balvinder & Julian

=== Week 9: Blackpool Week ===
- Musical guests: Steps — "Summer of Love", "Last Thing on My Mind", "Better the Devil You Know" and "Tragedy"; Lewis Capaldi — "Something in the Heavens"
- Special guests: Ashley Roberts, Danny Mac, Jay McGuiness and Layton Williams

Each couple performed one unlearned dance. This week's episode was staged in the Tower Ballroom at the Blackpool Tower in Blackpool, Lancashire.

La Voix, who was due to dance a Samba to "Love Is in the Air" by John Paul Young, was granted a bye to the following week due to an injury sustained in rehearsals. However, during the live show on 22 November, it was revealed that La Voix was unable to continue in the competition due to her injury. As a result, there was no elimination this week and all scores and public votes were carried over to the following week.

Couples are listed in the order they performed.

Couple	Scores	Dance	Music
Lewis & Katya	40 (10, 10, 10, 10)	Charleston	"I Bet You Look Good on the Dancefloor" — Arctic Monkeys
Balvinder & Julian	33 (8, 8, 8, 9)	Argentine tango	"The Logical Song" — Supertramp
Amber & Nikita	36 (9, 9, 9, 9)	Quickstep	"Reach" — S Club 7
Karen & Carlos	39 (9, 10, 10, 10)	Paso doble	"O Fortuna" — Carmina Burana
Alex & Johannes	35 (8, 9, 9, 9)	Couple's choice	"History Repeating + Look At Me" — Propellerheads feat. Shirley Bassey + Geri Halliwell
George & Alexis	39 (9, 10, 10, 10)	Salsa	"Party Rock Anthem" — LMFAO / "Rock This Party (Everybody Dance Now)" — Bob Sinclar / "Mr. Saxobeat" — Alexandra Stan

=== Week 10 ===
- Musical guest: Myles Smith — "Stay (If You Wanna Dance)"

Each couple performed one unlearned and one instant dance. Shirley Ballas had the casting vote this week.

Couples are listed in the order they performed.

Couple	Scores	Dance	Music	Result
Alex & Johannes	23 (4, 6, 6, 7)	Cha-cha-cha	"Ring My Bell" — Anita Ward	Eliminated
Alex & Johannes	3	Rumba	"Show Me Heaven" — Maria McKee	Eliminated
George & Alexis	34 (8, 8, 9, 9)	Quickstep	"I Get a Kick Out of You" — Frank Sinatra	Safe
George & Alexis	2	Tango	"When Doves Cry" — Prince	Safe
Lewis & Katya	36 (9, 9, 9, 9)	Rumba	"Falling" — Harry Styles	Safe
Lewis & Katya	6	Jive	"Wake Me Up Before You Go-Go" — Wham!	Safe
Balvinder & Julian	28 (7, 7, 7, 7)	Jive	"Right Back Where We Started From" — Maxine Nightingale	Bottom two
Balvinder & Julian	5	Paso doble	"Don't Let Me Be Misunderstood" — The Animals	Bottom two
Karen & Carlos	40 (10, 10, 10, 10)	Couple's choice	"Born This Way" — Lady Gaga	Safe
Karen & Carlos	1	Cha-cha-cha	"Beggin'" — The Four Seasons	Safe
Amber & Nikita	40 (10, 10, 10, 10)	Jive	"Proud Mary" — Tina Turner	Safe
Amber & Nikita	4	Samba	"Whenever, Wherever" — Shakira	Safe

Judges' votes to save

- Du Beke: Alex & Johannes
- Horwood: Balvinder & Julian
- Mabuse: Balvinder & Julian
- Ballas: Balvinder & Julian

=== Week 11: Musicals Week (Quarter-final) ===
- Musical guests: Tom Fletcher — "The Explorer and the Bear" (from Paddington: The Musical); The cast of Titanique

Each couple performed one unlearned dance to famous musicals songs. Motsi Mabuse had the casting vote this week.

Couples are listed in the order they performed.

Couple	Scores	Dance	Music	Musical	Result
George & Alexis	35 (8, 9, 9, 9)	Argentine tango	"The Point of No Return"	The Phantom of the Opera	Safe
Karen & Carlos	34 (8, 8, 9, 9)	Samba	"The Rhythm of Life"	Sweet Charity	Safe
Balvinder & Julian	35 (8, 9, 9, 9)	Viennese waltz	"Never Enough"	The Greatest Showman	Safe
Amber & Nikita	40 (10, 10, 10, 10)	Charleston	"Sit Down, You're Rockin' the Boat"	Guys and Dolls	Bottom two
Lewis & Katya	35 (8, 9, 9, 9)	Salsa	"The Dance at the Gym"	West Side Story	Eliminated

Judges' votes to save

- Ballas: Amber & Nikita
- Du Beke: Amber & Nikita
- Horwood: Amber & Nikita
- Mabuse: Did not vote, but would have voted to save Amber & Nikita

=== Week 12: Semi-final ===
- Musical guests: Kylie Minogue — "XMAS"; James — "Sit Down"

Each couple performed two unlearned dances. Craig Revel Horwood had the casting vote this week.

Couples are listed in the order they performed.

Couple	Scores	Dance	Music	Result
Balvinder & Julian	35 (8, 9, 9, 9)	Salsa	"Rhythm Is Gonna Get You" & "Get on Your Feet" — Gloria Estefan	Eliminated
Balvinder & Julian	35 (8, 9, 9, 9)	Waltz	"At This Moment" — Michael Bublé	Eliminated
Amber & Nikita	37 (9, 10, 9, 9)	Tango	"Higher" — Michael Bublé	Bottom two
Amber & Nikita	40 (10, 10, 10, 10)	Couple's choice	"Fly Me to the Moon" — Raye	Bottom two
Karen & Carlos	39 (9, 10, 10, 10)	Waltz	"One Moment in Time" — Whitney Houston	Safe
Karen & Carlos	39 (9, 10, 10, 10)	Salsa	"Turn the Beat Around" — Vicki Sue Robinson	Safe
George & Alexis	35 (8, 9, 9, 9)	Samba	"Volare" — Gipsy Kings	Safe
George & Alexis	37 (8, 9, 10, 10)	Charleston	"We No Speak Americano" — Yolanda Be Cool & DCUP	Safe

Judges' votes to save

- Mabuse: Amber & Nikita
- Ballas: Amber & Nikita
- Du Beke: Amber & Nikita
- Horwood: Did not vote, but would have voted to save Amber & Nikita

=== Week 13: Final ===
- Musical guests: Five — "Everybody Get Up", "Got the Feelin'", "If Ya Gettin' Down" & "Keep On Movin'"

Each couple performed three routines: one chosen by the judges, their showdance routine, and their favourite dance of the series.

Couples are listed in the order they performed.

Couple	Scores	Dance	Music	Result
Amber & Nikita	39 (9, 10, 10, 10)	Paso doble	"Dream On" — Aerosmith	Runners-up
Amber & Nikita	39 (9, 10, 10, 10)	Showdance	"Rain on Me" — Lady Gaga & Ariana Grande	Runners-up
Amber & Nikita	40 (10, 10, 10, 10)	Jive	"Proud Mary" — Tina Turner	Runners-up
George & Alexis	39 (9, 10, 10, 10)	Viennese waltz	"Somebody to Love" — Queen	Runners-up
George & Alexis	39 (9, 10, 10, 10)	Showdance	"Human" — The Killers	Runners-up
George & Alexis	39 (9, 10, 10, 10)	Paso doble	"Game of Survival" — Ruelle	Runners-up
Karen & Carlos	40 (10, 10, 10, 10)	Argentine tango	"Red Right Hand" — Nick Cave and the Bad Seeds	Winners
Karen & Carlos	37 (8, 10, 9, 10)	Showdance	"Inner Smile" — Texas	Winners
Karen & Carlos	40 (10, 10, 10, 10)	Jive	"One Way or Another" — Blondie	Winners

== Dance chart ==
- Week 1–9: One unlearned dance
- Week 10: One unlearned dance and one instant dance (previously learned style)
- Week 11: One unlearned dance
- Week 12: Two unlearned dances
- Week 13 (Final): Judges' choice, showdance & favourite dance of the series

Strictly Come Dancing series 23 - Dance chart
Couple	Week																
Couple	1	2	3	4	5	6	7	8	9	10 (Note: The second listed dance is the couple's instant dance, revealed immediately prior to their performance.)		11	12		13		
Karen & Carlos	Jive	Tango	Cha-cha-cha	Quickstep	Rumba	Argentine tango	Charleston	American Smooth	Paso doble	Couple's choice	Cha-cha-cha	Samba	Waltz	Salsa	Argentine tango	Showdance	Jive
Amber & Nikita	Waltz	Samba	American Smooth	Argentine tango	Cha-cha-cha	Viennese waltz	Salsa	Paso doble	Quickstep	Jive	Samba	Charleston	Tango	Couple's choice	Paso doble	Showdance	Jive
George & Alexis	American Smooth	Paso doble	Couple's choice	Tango	Jive	Cha-cha-cha	Viennese waltz	Rumba	Salsa	Quickstep	Tango	Argentine tango	Samba	Charleston	Viennese waltz	Showdance	Paso doble
Balvinder & Julian	Samba	Charleston	Foxtrot	Paso doble	Quickstep	Rumba	Couple's choice	American Smooth	Argentine tango	Jive	Paso doble	Viennese waltz	Salsa	Waltz			
Lewis & Katya	Jive	Viennese waltz	Paso doble	Foxtrot	Quickstep	Couple's choice	Cha-cha-cha	Tango	Charleston	Rumba	Jive	Salsa					
Alex & Johannes	Viennese waltz	Samba	Quickstep	Rumba	Foxtrot	Salsa	Paso doble	Waltz	Couple's choice	Cha-cha-cha	Rumba						
La Voix & Aljaž	American Smooth	Jive	Waltz	Cha-cha-cha	Salsa	Paso doble	Foxtrot	Couple's choice	~~Samba~~ (Note: This couple withdrew from the competition without performing their planned dance.)								
Vicky & Kai	Cha-cha-cha	Foxtrot	Charleston	Samba	Couple's choice	American Smooth	Tango	Jive									
Harry & Karen	Cha-cha-cha	Quickstep	Salsa	Rumba	Argentine tango	American Smooth	Samba										
Ellie & Vito	Cha-cha-cha	Waltz	Samba	Couple's choice	Salsa	Tango											
Jimmy & Lauren	Quickstep	Cha-cha-cha	Rumba	Couple's choice	American Smooth												
Stefan & Dianne	Foxtrot	Cha-cha-cha	~~Waltz~~ (Note: This couple was excused from competition due to illness or injury, and was granted a bye to the following week.)	Charleston													
Chris & Nadiya	Samba	Viennese waltz	Paso doble	Salsa													
Ross & Jowita	Cha-cha-cha	Waltz	Paso doble														
Thomas & Amy	Paso doble	Salsa															

== Ratings ==
Weekly ratings for each show on BBC One. All ratings are provided by BARB.

Episode	Date	Official rating (millions)	Weekly rank for BBC One	Weekly rank for all UK TV
Launch show	20 September	6.55	1	2
Week 1	27 September	7.69	1	1
Week 2	4 October	7.47	1	1
Week 2 results	5 October	6.99	2	2
Week 3	11 October	7.61	3	3
Week 3 results	12 October	6.68	4	5
Week 4	18 October	7.38	3	3
Week 4 results	19 October	6.85	4	4
Week 5	25 October	7.53	3	3
Week 5 results	26 October	6.98	4	4
Week 6	1 November	7.88	3	3
Week 6 results	2 November	7.48	4	4
Week 7	8 November	7.42	2	2
Week 7 results	9 November	7.05	3	3
Week 8	15 November	7.68	1	2
Week 8 results	16 November	7.09	2	3
Week 9	22 November	8.00	1	7
Week 9 results	23 November	7.03	2	9
Week 10	29 November	7.52	1	6
Week 10 results	30 November	7.23	2	8
Week 11	6 December	7.23	2	7
Week 11 results	7 December	7.44	1	5
Week 12	13 December	7.53	1	1
Week 12 results	14 December	7.23	2	2
Week 13	20 December	8.49	1	1
Series average (excl. launch show)	2025	7.40	—N/a	—N/a
