= So You Think You Can Dance (American TV series) season 18 =

Eighteenth (2024) season of the American reality show dance competition

So You Think You Can Dance
- Season 18
- Hosted by: Cat Deeley
- Judges: Allison Holker; JoJo Siwa; Maksim Chmerkovskiy
- Winner: Anthony Curley
- Runner-up: Dakayla Wilson

Release
- Original network: Fox
- Original release: March 4 – May 20, 2024

Season chronology
- ← Previous; Season 17

So You Think You Can Dance is an American dance competition reality show, which returned for its eighteenth and final season on March 4, 2024.

The eighteenth season of So You Think You Can Dance was announced on December 5, 2023, with a judging panel composed of series creator Nigel Lythgoe (which would have been his seventeenth season as judge), season 2 contestant and season 7–11 and 14 All-Star Allison Holker, and former Dancing with the Stars pro dancer Maksim Chmerkovskiy. Comfort Fedoke guest judged during the auditions. Cat Deeley returned to her role as host for a seventeenth consecutive season.

In January 2024, Lythgoe departed from the show following a sex abuse lawsuit from former judge Paula Abdul. He was replaced by season 17 judge JoJo Siwa.

The season premiere ended with a tribute to season 4 runner-up, former judge, and Holker's husband Stephen "tWitch" Boss who was found dead by suicide in December 2022.

On May 20, 2024, Anthony Curley was crowned the winner.

Only Madison Rouge Alvarado became the forty-third contestant in the show's run never to face elimination from being among the bottom three or bottom four contestants overall, and became the thirty-forth contestant to be in the grand finale to never to face elimination from being among the bottom three or bottom four overall.

On July 20, 2025, the show marked 20 years since its series premiere.

== Auditions ==
The auditions for season 18 of So You Think You Can Dance took place in Pullman Yards in Atlanta, Georgia where all the contestants had to audition in front of judges Maksim Chmerkovskiy, Allison Holker, and special guest judge Comfort Fedoke. From the thousands that applied through video submissions, the Top 100 contestants were invited to Atlanta to audition in front of the judges. Unlike previous seasons, this season took more of a documentary style and taught the audience a little bit more about the contestants' background. Notable contestants included Easton Magliarditi who auditioned for So You Think You Can Dance: The Next Generation, Jin Lee, who had dedicated her dance to Holker's deceased husband Stephen "tWitch" Boss, Kenidee Allen who had trained with Maks, Kaylee Bays, a contestant that had been diagnosed with Ehlers–Danlos syndrome that left her in a wheelchair, and Mariyah Hawkins who had previously auditioned for So You Think You Can Dance: The Next Generation.

== Choreography Round ==
Like season 17, the Callbacks/Academy Round was renamed the Choreography Round and took place over one day, as opposed to one week like past seasons. The Choreography Round consisted of two rounds led by choreographer, Galen Hooks. The first round had the contestants dancing in different groups, and the second round focused on partner work. 35 contestants made it to the choreography round and were eliminated after each round until 10 remained to advance to the challenge shows.

=== Top 10 contestants ===
==== Female contestants ====
| Contestant | Age | Home Town | Dance Style | Elimination date | Placement |
|---|---|---|---|---|---|
| Dakayla Wilson | 18 | Tampa, Florida | Jazz | May 20, 2024 | Runner-Up |
| Madison Rouge Alvarado | 21 | Chicago, Illinois | Jazz Funk | May 20, 2024 | 3rd Place |
| Mariyah Hawkins | 21 | Dallas, Texas | Contemporary | May 6, 2024 | Top 5 |
| Avery Gay | 19 | Scottsdale, Arizona | Ballet | April 15, 2024 | Top 10 |
| Olivia Alboher | 22 | Totowa, New Jersey | Contemporary | April 15, 2024 | Top 10 |

==== Male contestants ====
| Contestant | Age | Home Town | Dance Style | Elimination date | Placement |
|---|---|---|---|---|---|
| Anthony Curley | 19 | Phoenix, Arizona | Contemporary | N/A | Winner |
| Easton Magliarditi | 19 | Las Vegas, Nevada | Contemporary | May 13, 2024 | Top 4 |
| Jaylin Sanders | 20 | Los Angeles, California | Hip-Hop | April 29, 2024 | Top 6 |
| Braylon Browner | 18 | Killeen, Texas | Contemporary | April 22, 2024 | Top 8 |
| Roman Nevinchanyi | 26 | Kiev, Ukraine | Ballroom | April 22, 2024 | Top 8 |

== Elimination chart ==
Contestants are listed in chronological order of elimination.

Legend
| Female | Male | Bottom 3/4 contestants | Eliminated |

| Result show date: | 4/15 | 4/22 | 4/29 | 5/6 | 5/13 | 5/20 |
| Contestant | Results | | | | | |
| Anthony Curley | | Btm 4 | | Btm 3 | | Winner |
| Dakayla Wilson | | Btm 4 | Btm 3 | | | Runner-Up |
| Madison Rouge Alvarado | | | | | | 3rd Place |
| Easton Magliarditi | Btm 4 | | | Btm 3 | Elim | |
| Mariyah Hawkins | | | Btm 3 | Elim | | |
| Jaylin Sanders | | | Elim | | | |
| Roman Nevinchanyi | | Elim | | | | |
| Braylon Browner | Btm 4 | Elim | | | | |
| Olivia Alboher | Elim | | | | | |
| Avery Gay | Elim | | | | | |

== Challenge shows ==
For the first time this series, the judges are solely responsible for which contestants are safe and which are going home, with no audience voting. Previously, the contestants which received the most audience votes each week would be safe from been sent home.

=== Top 10 Perform – Challenge #1: Music Videos (April 15, 2024) ===
In this challenge, the top 10 contestants were divided into two groups of five contestants; each group performed a music video together. The contestants were judged by how they performed both during the filming of the music video as well as the finished product. The judges determined the bottom 4 contestants; the bottom 4 each performed a solo and the judges sent home two contestants in each gender.

- Group Routine: Top 10 with the Judges: "Don't Start Now" – Dua Lipa (Hip Hop; Choreographer: Luther Brown)

==== Groups ====
| Contestants | Style | Music | Choreographer(s) | Results |
|---|---|---|---|---|
| Avery Gay | Contemporary | "All Around Me" – Justin Bieber | Phillip Chbeeb & (season 5) Makenzie Chbeeb-Dustman | Eliminated |
| Dakayla Wilson | Contemporary | "All Around Me" – Justin Bieber | Phillip Chbeeb & (season 5) Makenzie Chbeeb-Dustman | Safe |
| Braylon Browner | Contemporary | "All Around Me" – Justin Bieber | Phillip Chbeeb & (season 5) Makenzie Chbeeb-Dustman | Bottom 4 |
| Roman Nevinchanyi | Contemporary | "All Around Me" – Justin Bieber | Phillip Chbeeb & (season 5) Makenzie Chbeeb-Dustman | Safe |
| Jaylin Sanders | Contemporary | "All Around Me" – Justin Bieber | Phillip Chbeeb & (season 5) Makenzie Chbeeb-Dustman | Safe |
| Olivia Alboher | Hip Hop | "Juice" – Lizzo | Luther Brown | Eliminated |
| Mariyah Hawkins | Hip Hop | "Juice" – Lizzo | Luther Brown | Safe |
| Madison Rouge Alvarado | Hip Hop | "Juice" – Lizzo | Luther Brown | Safe |
| Easton Magliarditi | Hip Hop | "Juice" – Lizzo | Luther Brown | Bottom 4 |
| Anthony Curley | Hip Hop | "Juice" – Lizzo | Luther Brown | Safe |

==== Solos ====
| Contestant | Style | Music |
|---|---|---|
| Easton Magliarditi | Contemporary | "The Blower's Daughter" – Damien Rice |
| Avery Gay | Ballet | "Can't Catch Me Now" – Olivia Rodrigo |
| Olivia Alboher | Contemporary | "Snowing" – Sonya Kitchell |
| Braylon Browner | Contemporary | "Life is Not the Same" – James Blake |

=== Top 8 Perform – Challenge #2: Broadway (April 22, 2024) ===
In this challenge, the top 8 were divided into two groups of four contestants; each group performed a Broadway piece together. The contestants were judged by how they performed both during the filming of the Broadway piece as well as the finished product. The judges determined the bottom 4 contestants; the bottom 4 contestants each performed a solo and the judges sent home two contestants.

- Group Routine: Top 8: "If My Friends Could See Me Now" – Sammy Davis Jr. (Broadway; Choreographer: Al Blackstone)

==== Groups ====
| Contestants | Style | Music | Choreographer(s) | Results |
|---|---|---|---|---|
| Anthony Curley | Broadway | "In the Mood" – BBC Big Band "I Got Rhythm" – Bobby Darin | Al Blackstone | Bottom 4 |
| Dakayla Wilson | Broadway | "In the Mood" – BBC Big Band "I Got Rhythm" – Bobby Darin | Al Blackstone | Bottom 4 |
| Jaylin Sanders | Broadway | "In the Mood" – BBC Big Band "I Got Rhythm" – Bobby Darin | Al Blackstone | Safe |
| Madison Rouge Alvarado | Broadway | "In the Mood" – BBC Big Band "I Got Rhythm" – Bobby Darin | Al Blackstone | Safe |
| Braylon Browner | Broadway | "Willkommen" – Cabaret "Money" – Cabaret | Sarah O'Gleby | Eliminated |
| Easton Magliarditi | Broadway | "Willkommen" – Cabaret "Money" – Cabaret | Sarah O'Gleby | Safe |
| Mariyah Hawkins | Broadway | "Willkommen" – Cabaret "Money" – Cabaret | Sarah O'Gleby | Safe |
| Roman Nevinchanyi | Broadway | "Willkommen" – Cabaret "Money" – Cabaret | Sarah O'Gleby | Eliminated |

==== Solos ====
| Contestant | Style | Music |
|---|---|---|
| Braylon Browner | Contemporary | "Stabat Mater" – Woodkid |
| Roman Nevinchanyi | Ballroom | "Beggin'" – Måneskin |
| Dakayla Wilson | Jazz | "Demons" – Doja Cat |
| Anthony Curley | Contemporary | "Punchbag Love" – Adam French |

=== Top 6 Perform – Challenge #3: Movies (April 29, 2024) ===
In this challenge, the top 6 contestants were divided into two groups of three contestants; each group performed a movie sequence together. The contestants were judged by how they performed both during the filming of the movie sequence as well as the finished product. The judges determined the bottom 3 contestants; the bottom 3 contestants each performed a solo and the judges sent home one contestant.

- Group Routine: Top 6: "Low" – Flo Rida (Hip Hop; Choreographer: N/A)

==== Groups ====
| Contestants | Style | Music | Choreographer(s) | Results |
|---|---|---|---|---|
| Easton Magliarditi | Broadway | "When the Sun Goes Down" – In the Heights | Chris Scott | Safe |
| Madison Rouge Alvarado | Broadway | "When the Sun Goes Down" – In the Heights | Chris Scott | Safe |
| Jaylin Sanders | Broadway | "When the Sun Goes Down" – In the Heights | Chris Scott | Eliminated |
| Anthony Curley | Jazz | "Footloose" – Footloose | Jamal Sims | Safe |
| Dakayla Wilson | Jazz | "Footloose" – Footloose | Jamal Sims | Bottom 3 |
| Mariyah Hawkins | Jazz | "Footloose" – Footloose | Jamal Sims | Bottom 3 |

==== Solos ====
| Contestant | Style | Music |
|---|---|---|
| Mariyah Hawkins | Contemporary | "Stuttering" – Jazmine Sullivan |
| Jaylin Sanders | Hip-Hop | "Proud... Uuu" – TellaX |
| Dakayla Wilson | Jazz | "My Mind" – Yebba |

=== Top 5 Perform – Challenge #4: On Tour (May 6, 2024) ===
- Group Routine: Top 6: "Boombayah" – Blackpink (Hip Hop; Choreographer: Kyle Hanagami)

==== Groups ====
| Contestants | Style | Music | Choreographer(s) | Results |
|---|---|---|---|---|
| Madison Rouge Alvarado | Hip Hop/Contemporary Fusion | "Church" & "Dreaming" – T-Pain | Fullout Cortland & Kyle Hanagami | Safe |
| Anthony Curley | Hip Hop/Contemporary Fusion | "Church" & "Dreaming" – T-Pain | Fullout Cortland & Kyle Hanagami | Bottom 3 |
| Mariyah Hawkins | Hip Hop/Contemporary Fusion | "Church" & "Dreaming" – T-Pain | Fullout Cortland & Kyle Hanagami | Eliminated |
| Easton Magliarditi | Hip Hop/Contemporary Fusion | "Church" & "Dreaming" – T-Pain | Fullout Cortland & Kyle Hanagami | Bottom 3 |
| Dakayla Wilson | Hip Hop/Contemporary Fusion | "Church" & "Dreaming" – T-Pain | Fullout Cortland & Kyle Hanagami | Safe |

==== Solos ====
| Contestant | Style | Music |
|---|---|---|
| Easton Magliarditi | Contemporary | "Lately" – Stevie Wonder |
| Mariyah Hawkins | Contemporary | "Lost One" – Jazmine Sullivan |
| Anthony Curley | Contemporary | "Disconnect" – 6lack |

=== Top 4 Perform – Challenge #5: Brand Challenge (May 13, 2024) ===
- Group Routine: Top 4: "She's All I Wanna Be" – Tate McRae (Contemporary; Choreographer: Tessandra Chavez)

==== Groups ====
| Contestants | Style | Music | Choreographer(s) | Results |
|---|---|---|---|---|
| Madison Rouge Alvarado | Hip Hop/Contemporary Fusion | "I'm Good (Blue)" – David Guetta & Bebe Rexha | Hi-Hat | Safe |
| Anthony Curley | Hip Hop/Contemporary Fusion | "I'm Good (Blue)" – David Guetta & Bebe Rexha | Hi-Hat | Safe |
| Easton Magliarditi | Hip Hop/Contemporary Fusion | "I'm Good (Blue)" – David Guetta & Bebe Rexha | Hi-Hat | Eliminated |
| Dakayla Wilson | Hip Hop/Contemporary Fusion | "I'm Good (Blue)" – David Guetta & Bebe Rexha | Hi-Hat | Safe |

==== Top 4 contestants' solos ====
| Contestant | Style | Music |
|---|---|---|
| Anthony Curley | Contemporary | "Still Alive" – Aaryan Shah |
| Dakayla Wilson | Jazz | "My Immortal" – Evanescence |
| Easton Magliarditi | Contemporary | "Perfectly Wrong" – Shawn Mendes |
| Madison Rouge Alvarado | Jazz Funk | "Can't Be Tamed" – Miley Cyrus |

=== The Season 18 Finale (May 20, 2024) ===
Each of the top 3 contestants performed twice: a duet with a fellow Top 10 contestant of their choice, and a solo.

- Groups:
  - Top 10 & Judges: "Fly as Me" – Silk Sonic (Hip Hop; Choreographer: Luther Brown)
  - Olivia, Avery, Roman, Jaylin & All-Stars (Bailey Munoz (season 16 winner), Alex Wong (season 7 contestant), Alexis Warr (season 17 winner) & Jasmine Harper (season 10 contestant)): Performer: Natasha Bedingfield – "Unwritten"

==== Duets ====
| Contestant | Style | Music | Choreographer(s) | Results |
|---|---|---|---|---|
| Madison Rouge Alvarado | Jazz Funk (w/ Braylon Browner) | "Not About You" – Haiku Hands | Kayla Radomski (season 5) & Tucker Barkley | Eliminated |
| Anthony Curley | Hip Hop (w/ Mariyah Hawkins) | "Bang" – Jacob Banks & Tobe Nwigwe | Diana Matos & Ivan Koumaev (season 2) | Winner |
| Dakayla Wilson | Contemporary (w/ Easton Magliarditi) | "Change" – Lana Del Rey | Talia Favia | Runner-Up |

==== Final Two's solos ====
| Contestant | Style | Music |
|---|---|---|
| Anthony Curley | Contemporary | "Better Alone" – Aaryan Shah |
| Dakayla Wilson | Jazz | "A Palé" – Rosalía |

== Ratings ==
Viewership and ratings per episode of So You Think You Can Dance (American TV series) season 18
| No. | Title | Air date | Rating/share (18–49) | Viewers (millions) |
|---|---|---|---|---|
| 1 | "Auditions: Day One" | March 4, 2024 | 0.2/2 | 1.04 |
| 2 | "Auditions: Day Two" | March 11, 2024 | 0.1/1 | 0.87 |
| 3 | "Auditions: Day Three" | March 18, 2024 | 0.2/2 | 0.89 |
| 4 | "The Final Audition: Top Ten Revealed" | March 25, 2024 | 0.2/2 | 0.85 |
| 5 | "Challenge #1: Music Videos" | April 15, 2024 | 0.2/2 | 0.81 |
| 6 | "Challenge #2: Broadway" | April 22, 2024 | 0.2/1 | 0.84 |
| 7 | "Challenge #3: Movies" | April 29, 2024 | 0.1/1 | 0.76 |
| 8 | "Challenge #4: On Tour" | May 6, 2024 | 0.1/1 | 0.78 |
| 9 | "Challenge #5: Brand Challenge" | May 13, 2024 | 0.1/1 | 0.85 |
| 10 | "The Finale" | May 20, 2024 | 0.1/1 | 0.80 |
