= Julian Caillon =

Australian dancer and choreographer (born 1995)

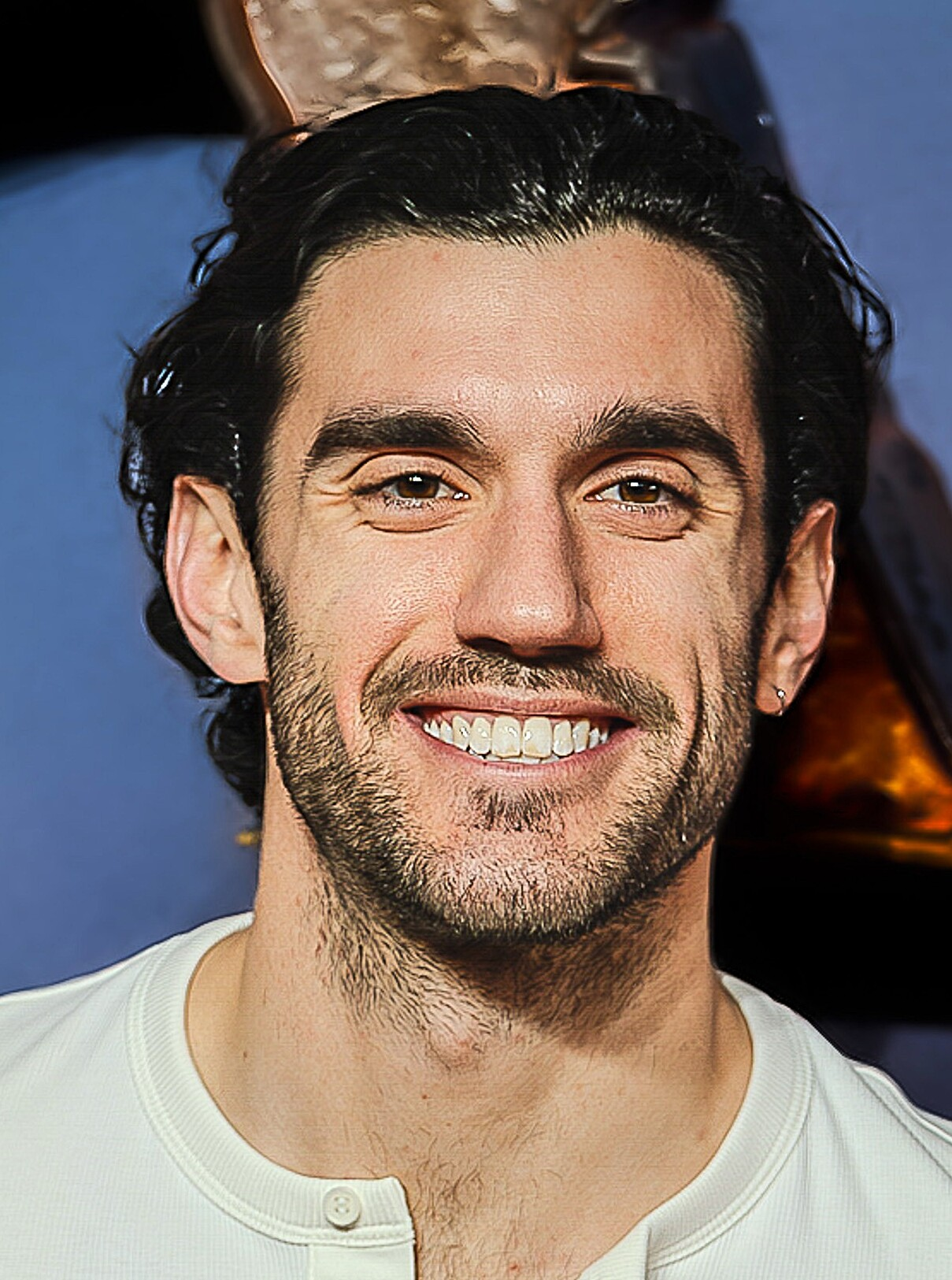
- Caillon in 2025
- Born: 4 September 1995 (age 31); Sydney, Australia
- Occupations: Dancer; choreographer
- Known for: Dancing with the Stars; Strictly Come Dancing

Julian Caillon (born 4 September 1995) is an Australian dancer and choreographer, known for appearing as a professional dancer on the Australian version of Dancing with the Stars and the British version of the show Strictly Come Dancing.

== Early and personal life ==
Caillon was born on 4 September 1995 in Sydney, Australia and is of French and Italian descent. He began training in Ballroom and Latin at the age of 10, and studied dance at Newtown High School of the Performing Arts. Caillon has also worked as a personal trainer. He has been engaged to his partner Sofia since December 2024.

== Career ==
Caillon has been Vice National Champion as well as achieving results representing Australia across Asia and Europe. He was also a contestant on the fourth season of So You Think You Can Dance Australia in 2014 and has toured with the live dance show Burn the Floor.

=== Dancing with the Stars ===
In January 2020, Caillon joined the Australian version of Dancing with the Stars as a professional, seventeenth season. He was paired with Gogglebox Australia star Angie Kent, and the pair were the second couple to be eliminated. He returned for the eighteenth season in 2021 where he was paired with model and returning contestant Erin McNaught, who had previously competed in the twelfth season. They were the second couple to be eliminated. In 2022, Caillon was paired with Kent again for the nineteenth season, where they were again the second couple to be eliminated.

Series	Partner	Place	Average Score
17	Angie Kent	9th	15.7
18	Erin McNaught	13th	26.0
19	Angie Kent	13th	25.0

==== Season 17 ====
Celebrity partner: Angie Kent

Week No.	Dance/Song	Judges' scores (Note: Individual judges' scores are listed in the following order: Craig Revel Horwood, Sharna Burgess, Tristan MacManus.)			Total	Result
1	Foxtrot / "Grace Kelly"	5 (Note: Mandy Moore stood in as a judge this week.)	5	4	14	No elimination
2	Tango / "Castles"	6	7	6	19	Safe
3	Waltz / "Unforgettable"	3	5	6	14	Eliminated

==== Season 18 ====
Celebrity partner: Erin McNaught

Week No.	Dance/Song	Judges' scores (Note: Individual judges' scores are listed in the following order: Todd McKenney, Helen Richey, Paul Mercurio, Mark Wilson.)				Total	Result
2	Viennese waltz / "You Don't Own Me"	6	7	8	5	26	Eliminated

==== Season 19 ====
Celebrity partner: Angie Kent

Week No.	Dance/Song	Judges' scores (Note: Individual judges' scores are listed in the following order: Todd McKenney, Helen Richey, Paul Mercurio, Mark Wilson.)				Total	Result
2	Cha-cha-cha / "Electricity"	6	5	7	7	25	Eliminated

=== Strictly Come Dancing ===
In July 2025, Caillon was announced to be joining the twenty-third series of the British version of Strictly Come Dancing as a professional dancer, alongside Alexis Warr. Following the announcement, Caillon said he had "watched Strictly Come Dancing for years, especially cheering on all the amazing dancers I know and work with who've been part of it". For his first series, he was paired with EastEnders actress Balvinder Sopal. They broke the record for competing in the most dance-offs in the show's history, having won five and being eliminated after their sixth, in the semi-final against Amber Davies and Nikita Kuzmin, ultimately finishing in fourth place.

Series	Partner	Place	Average Score
23	Balvinder Sopal	4th	29.5
24	Dame Sarah Storey	13th	20.0

Highest and lowest scoring per dance
Dance	Partner	Highest	Partner	Lowest
American Smooth	Balvinder Sopal	27		
Argentine Tango	Balvinder Sopal	33		
Cha-cha-cha				
Charleston	Balvinder Sopal	30	Sarah Storey	24
Couples Choice	Balvinder Sopal	34		
Foxtrot	Balvinder Sopal	26		
Instant Dance	Balvinder Sopal	5		
Jive	Balvinder Sopal	28		
Paso Doble	Balvinder Sopal	28	Sarah Storey	20
Quickstep	Balvinder Sopal	28	Sarah Storey	15
Rumba	Balvinder Sopal	28		
Salsa	Balvinder Sopal	35		
Samba	Balvinder Sopal	17		
Showdance				
Tango	Sarah Storey	21		
Viennese Waltz	Balvinder Sopal	35		
Waltz	Balvinder Sopal	35		

==== Series 23 ====
Celebrity partner: Balvinder Sopal

Week No.	Dance/Song	Judges' score (Note: Individual judges' scores are listed in the following order: Craig Revel Horwood, Motsi Mabuse, Shirley Ballas, Anton Du Beke.)				Total	Result
1	Samba / "(Shake, Shake, Shake) Shake Your Booty"	4	4	4	5	17	No Elimination
2	Charleston / "Been Like This"	7	8	8	7	30	Safe
3	Foxtrot / "The Way You Look Tonight"	7	7	6	6	26	Bottom two
4	Paso Doble / “Rodrigo y Gabriela”	7	7	7	7	28	Bottom two
5	Quickstep / “Texas Hold 'Em”	7	7	7	7	28	Safe
6	Rumba / “Stay”	7	7	7	7	28	Bottom two
7	Couple's choice / “Sapphire”	7	9	9	9	34	Safe
8	American Smooth / "My Guy"	6	7	7	7	27	Bottom two
9	Argentine tango / "The Logical Song"	8	8	8	9	33	No Elimination
10	Jive / "Right Back Where We Started From"	7	7	7	7	33 (Note: The couple also received five extra points for their Paso Doble to "Don't Let Me Be Misunderstood" in the Instant Dance.)	Bottom two
11	Viennese Waltz / "Never Enough"	8	9	9	9	35	Safe
12	Salsa / "Rhythm Is Gonna Get You" & "Get on Your Feet"	8	9	9	9	35	Eliminated
12	Waltz / "At This Moment"	8	9	9	9	35	Eliminated

- Red number indicates when Balvinder and Julian were at the bottom of the leaderboard.

==== Series 24 ====
Celebrity partner: Sarah Storey

Week No.	Dance/Song	Judges Scores (Note: Individual judges' scores are listed in the following order: Craig Revel Horwood, Motsi Mabuse, Shirley Ballas, Anton Du Beke.)				Total	Result
1	Quickstep/"C'est Magnifique	3	4	4	4	15	No Eliminations
2	Charleston/"Supercalifragilisticexpialidocious	6	6	6	6	24	Safe
3	Paso doble/California Dreamin'	4	5	5	6	20	Safe
4	Tango/That Don't Impress Me Much	5	6	6	6	21	Eliminated

- Red number indicates when Sarah and Julian were at the bottom of the leaderboard.

=== Strictly Come Dancing Christmas Special ===
Caillon will dance with Ashley Roberts for the 2026 Strictly Come Dancing Christmas Special.
