= Lewis Cope =

English actor and dancer (born 1995)

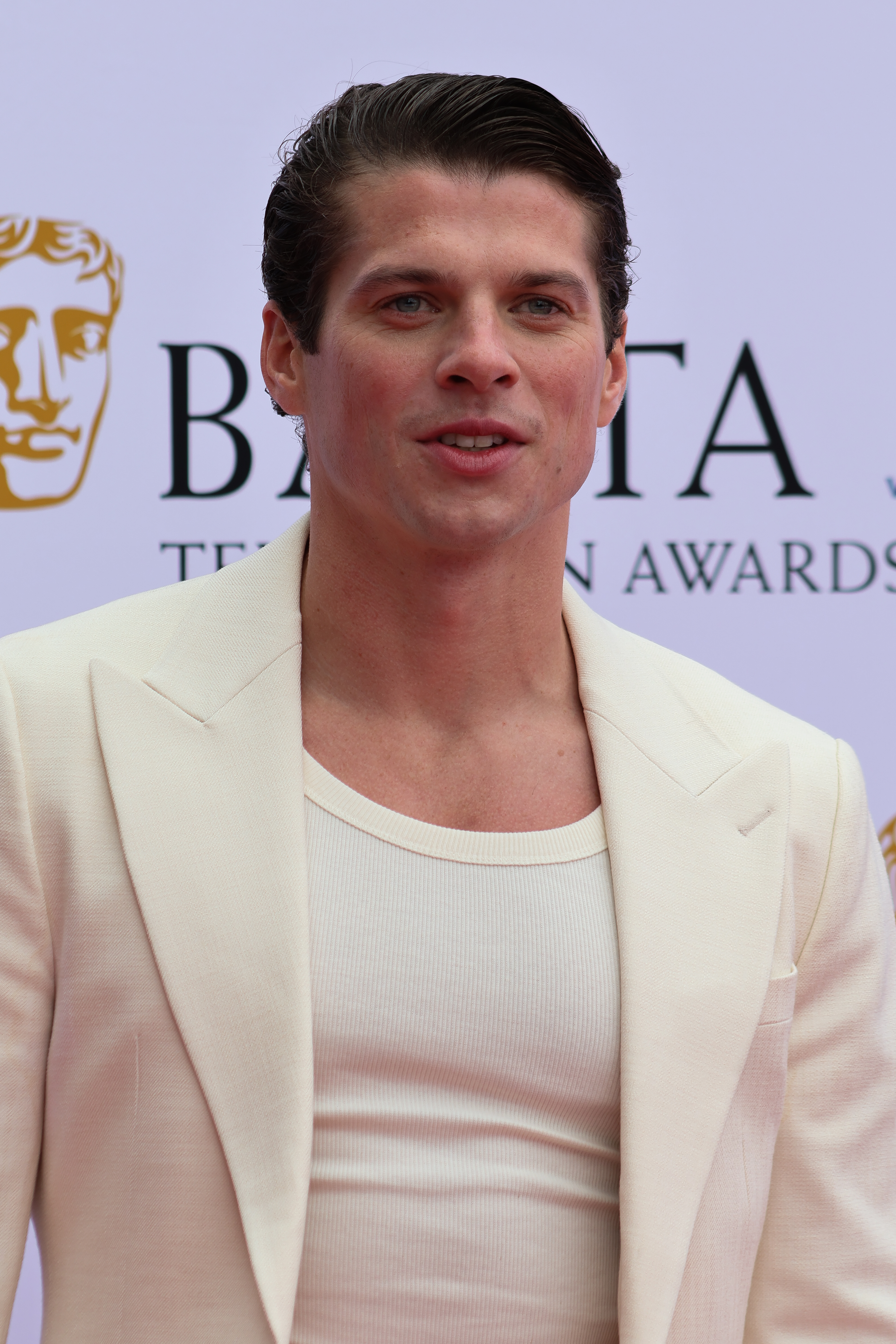
- Cope in 2026
- Born: 19 March 1995 (age 31); Hartlepool, County Durham, England
- Occupations: Actor; dancer
- Years active: 2008–present
- Television: Got to Dance; Emmerdale; Strictly Come Dancing

Lewis Cope (born 19 March 1995) is an English actor and dancer. After beginning his career as a child actor appearing in a West End production of Billy Elliot the Musical, he competed in the Sky One dance series Got to Dance, finishing as a runner-up on the fourth series in 2013. Cope then went on to act in series including Hetty Feather, Doctors and Vera. In 2022, he was cast as Nicky Miligan in the ITV soap opera Emmerdale. After leaving the series in 2024, he appeared as a contestant on the twenty-third series of Strictly Come Dancing the year after.

== Life and career ==
Cope was born on 19 March 1995 in Hartlepool, County Durham, and has 13 siblings. He attended both English Martyrs School and Sixth Form College and Royal Welsh College of Music & Drama.

In 2008, aged 13, Cope was cast in the role of Michael in a West End theatre production of Billy Elliot the Musical. In 2010, he appeared in the BBC sketch show The Impressions Show with Culshaw and Stephenson. He subsequently joined the hip-hop dance troupe Ruff Diamond, who finished as runner-up on the Sky One dance competition Got to Dance in 2013. Cope went on to appear in the short films A Six and Two Threes and Waterbabies, as well as television series including Hetty Feather (2019), Doctors (2019) and Vera (2021). His stage credits include Richard III (2017), Punk Rock (2017), Macbeth (2017), The Night Watch (2018), Spilt (2018), Candide (2018), F$%k Magical Michael (2019), Witness for the Prosecution (2019) and The Legend of Sleepy Hollow (2022).

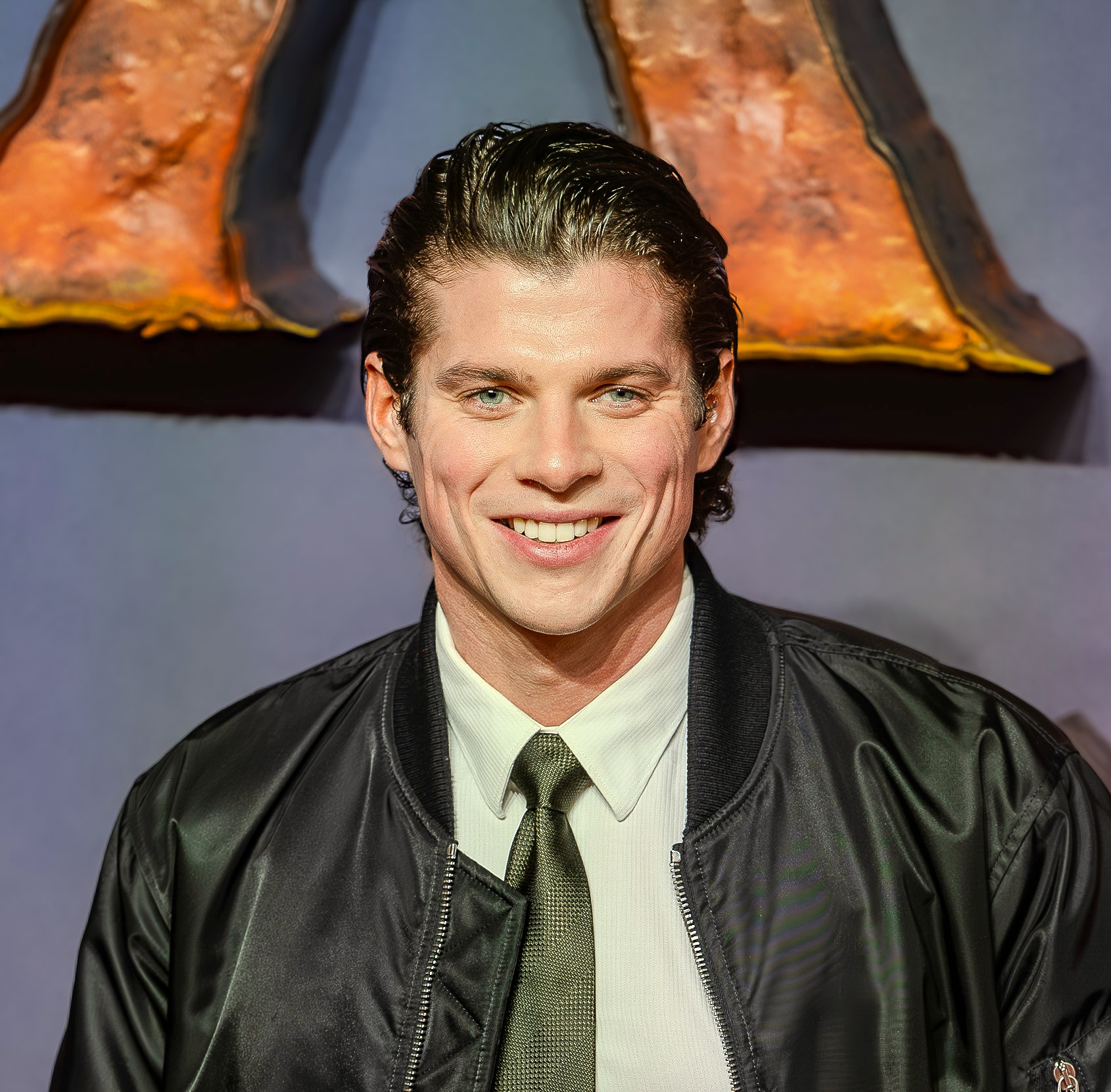
Cope at the premiere of Avatar: Fire and Ash in December 2025

In 2022, Cope joined the cast of the ITV soap opera Emmerdale as Nicky Miligan. He was initially introduced as a male nanny who attends an interview for a job caring for Gabby Thomas (Rosie Bentham) and Dawn Fletcher's (Olivia Bromley) children at Home Farm, before being established as the son of Caleb Miligan (William Ash), and the grandson of Frank Tate (Norman Bowler) and Faith Dingle (Sally Dexter). He departed the soap in July 2024, with the character leaving alongside boyfriend Suni Sharma (Brahmdeo Shannon Ramana).

In 2023, Cope appeared in an episode of the mystery crime series Mrs Sidhu Investigates. In August 2025, Cope was announced as a contestant on the twenty-third series of Strictly Come Dancing, as a replacement for Kristian Nairn, who withdrew from the competition due to health issues. He was partnered with Katya Jones. They scored the series' first perfect score of 40, with a couple's choice dance in the Halloween special, with judge Anton du Beke describing the dance "as good as any we've ever seen on any series". Cope and Jones became the ninth couple to be eliminated in week 11 after losing the dance-off to Amber Davies and Nikita Kuzmin.

== Filmography ==
Year	Title	Role	Notes	Ref.
2010	The Impressions Show with Culshaw and Stephenson	Various	1 episode	
2013	Got to Dance	Himself	Runner-up; series 4	
2015	A Six and Two Threes	Bully	Short film	
2018	Waterbabies	Owen	Short film	
2019	Hetty Feather	Wilfred	Episode: "The Return"	
2019	Doctors	Tom Griffiths	Episode: "Trapped"	
2021	Vera	Marcus Hynde	Episode: "Witness"	
2022–2024	Emmerdale	Nicky Miligan	Regular role	
2023	Mrs Sidhu Investigates	Lenny Lowe	Episode: "On the Ropes"	
2025	Strictly Come Dancing	Himself	Contestant – 5th place; series 23	
2026	Forever Home	Kaden	Lead role	

== Stage ==
Year	Title	Role	Ref.
2008–2009	Billy Elliot the Musical	Michael	
2017	Richard III	Henry VII / Richmond	
2017	Punk Rock	Nicholas	
2017	Macbeth	Banquo	
2018	The Night Watch	Duncan	
2018	Spilt	Chase	
2018	Candide	Ben	
2019	F$%k Magical Michael	D	
2019	Witness for the Prosecution	Leonard Vole	
2022	The Legend of Sleepy Hollow	Brom "Bones" Van Brunt	
