= George Clarke (internet personality) =

English social media personality (born 1999)

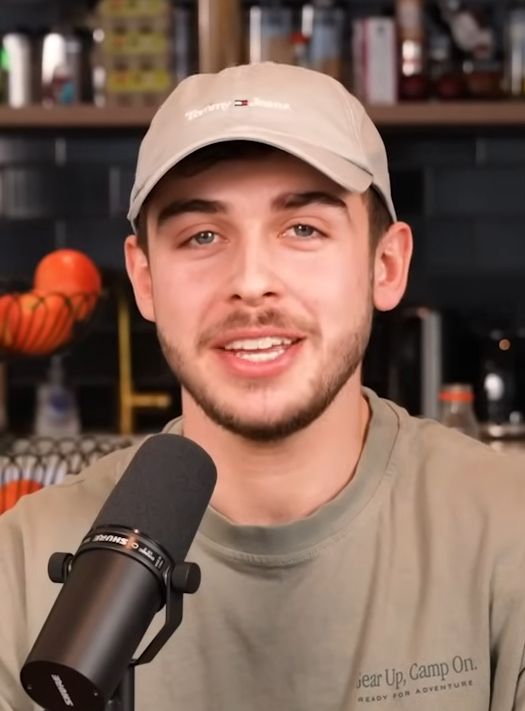
- Clarke in 2024
- Born: George Arthur Clarke; 3 December 1999 (age 26); Bristol, England
- Occupations: Social personality; YouTuber; podcaster
- Years active: 2019–present
- Partner: Yasmin Ameelia Bennett

TikTok information
- Page: georgeclarkeey
- Followers: 2.5 million

YouTube information
- Channel: George Clarkey
- Genres: Entertainment; gaming; vlog; reaction
- Subscribers: 734 thousand
- Views: 61.6 million

George Arthur Clarke (born 3 December 1999) is an English social media personality, YouTuber and podcast host. After launching his TikTok and YouTube accounts, which consist mainly of entertainment, gaming, vlog and reaction videos, he began co-hosting The Useless Hotline podcast in 2022 which ended in 2026. In 2025, he was a runner up on the twenty-third series of Strictly Come Dancing. He also participated in season 8 of Celebrity Gogglebox alongside his ex podcast co-host Max Balegde in June 2026.

== Life and career ==
George Arthur Clarke was born on 3 December 1999 in Bristol, England. His father, Sean Clarke, is managing director of Aardman Animations. He played a key role for Downend Rangers football club in his youth under the leadership of Gavin Reader. He has an older sister named Emily. In his early years he received private education from Collegiate School, Bristol. He studied Sports and Exercise Science at University of Exeter. Clarke launched his TikTok account in December 2019, and began posting on YouTube thereafter. Clarke began collaborating with fellow YouTuber Alex Elmslie, known online as ImAllexx, in 2020, which massively boosted his YouTube audience. Following allegations of abuse made against Elmslie by his former partner in 2024, Clarke publicly distanced himself from Elmslie and ended their association.

He has since amassed over 3 million followers across both platforms, as well as Instagram and Twitch. His content consists mainly of entertainment, gaming, vlog and reaction videos. He also appeared in several videos alongside the Sidemen. In November 2022, Clarke began co-hosting The Useless Hotline podcast alongside Max Balegde, the premise of which sees listeners sending in their questions and dilemmas, with Clarke and Balegde giving their advice. The Useless Hotline hosted its final episode on 3 May 2026. Clarke is also an ambassador of the not-for-profit organisation Encephalitis International, with his mother suffering from the condition.

In March 2025, Clarke appeared on the second series of the Sidemen's Netflix reality competition series Inside, where he finished in fifth place. In August 2025, Clarke was announced as a contestant on the twenty-third series of Strictly Come Dancing. He was partnered with the American professional dancer and choreographer Alexis Warr, who was also making her debut on the show. The couple finished as joint runners-up on the show alongside Amber Davies and Nikita Kuzmin.

In January 2026, Clarke co-founded the collaborative YouTube channel Friends From Work with Arthur Hill, ArthurTV and ItalianBach. In July 2026, Clarke was awarded an Honorary Doctorate of Arts in recognition of his outstanding contribution to contemporary entertainment, digital media, and the creative arts from Bath Spa University.

== Personal life ==
In 2025, Clarke stated on a livestream that he was in a relationship with model Yasmin Bennett.

== Filmography ==
=== Television ===
Year	Title	Role	Production	Notes	Ref.
2025	Inside	Contestant	Netflix	Series 2, 5th place	
2025	Baller League: Legends vs Creators	Himself	Sky UK, DAZN, YouTube		
2025	Strictly Come Dancing	Contestant	BBC One	Series 23, runner-up	
2025	Michael McIntyre's The Wheel	Celebrity Expert	BBC One	Series 6, 1 episode	
2026	Celebrity Gogglebox	Himself	Channel 4	Series 8, 2 episodes	
2026	Gladiators: Celebrity Special	Contestant	BBC One	Series 3	

== Podcasts ==
- The Useless Hotline (2022–2026)
