= Forever Home =

British television series

- Genre: Crime drama
- Based on: Forever Home by Graham Norton
- Screenplay by: Clara Salaman
- Directed by: Claire Winyard; Paul Gay
- Starring: Amy Nuttall; Douglas Henshall; Denise Welch; Lewis Cope; Kevin Whately
- Countries of origin: United Kingdom; Spain
- Original language: English
- No. of series: 1
- No. of episodes: 6

Production
- Executive producers: Graham Norton; Clara Salaman; Kirstie Macdonald; Erika Kennair; JC Acosta
- Producer: Will Nicholson
- Production companies: FilmNation Entertainment; Mediapro

Original release
- Network: Channel 5
- Release: 14 September 2026 – present

Forever Home is a British/Spanish murder mystery television series adapted from the novel of the same name by Graham Norton. The cast includes Amy Nuttall, Douglas Henshall, Denise Welch and Kevin Whately. It began broadcasting on Channel 5 on 14 September 2026.

== Premise ==
A woman discovers a corpse buried in the cellar of the family home, and wonders if her husband is a killer and that is why he never wanted to sell the house.

== Cast ==
- Amy Nuttall as Carol Crottie
- Denise Welch as Moira Crottie
- Douglas Henshall as Robert Barrie
- Lewis Cope as Kaden Barrie
- Jenny Walser as Sally Barrie
- Shane Zaza as Dan Evans
- Kevin Whately as Silent Dave
- James Baxter as Patrick Tanner
- Ricky Shah as DCI Isaac Taylor
- Dani Arlington as Davina
- Evelyn Carpenter as Emily
- Elizabeth Edmonds as Mrs Granger
- Anna Leong Brophy as Anna Tanner
- Evelyn Carpenter as Emily Tanner
- Jessie Donovan as Lisa
- Tommi Vicky as Hilary Beech
- Deka Walmsley as Steve
- Eleanor Montgomery as Lizzy

== Production ==
A television series adapted from the novel Forever Home by Graham Norton by production companies FilmNation Entertainment and Spain's Mediapro to broadcast in the United Kingdom on Channel 5 was announced in January 2026. Norton is an executive producer on the series which is adapted by Clara Salaman, who is also an executive producer alongside Kirstie Macdonald, Erika Kennair and JC Acosta. Paul Gay and Claire Winyard direct episodes with Will Nicholson as series producer.

The cast of the series is led by Douglas Henshall, Amy Nuttall and Lewis Cope as well as Denise Welch, Aimée Kelly, Shane Zaza, James Baxter and Kevin Whately. The role of Robert had personal resonance for Henshall as the character has dementia and he has witnessed the effects of it within his own family.

The setting for the series was moved from Ireland to England from the book. Filming took place in Northumberland in 2026. First-look images from filming were released to the media in August 2026.

== Broadcast ==
Forever Home began broadcasting on Channel 5 on 14 September 2026.
