= Merchant (reggae artist) =

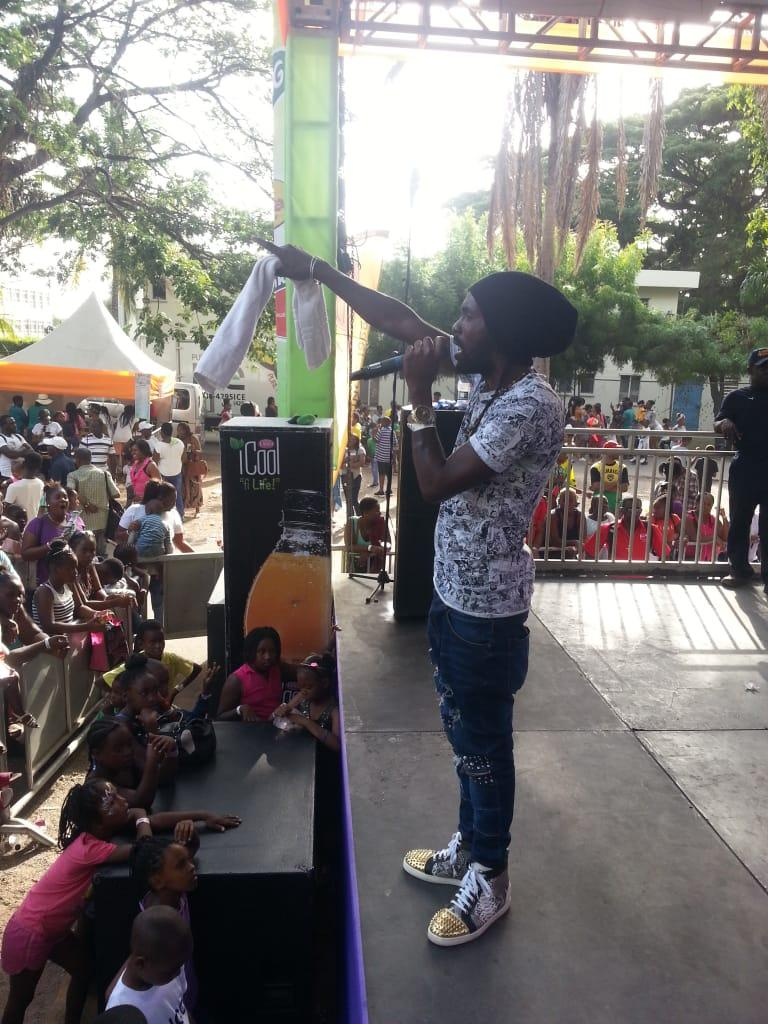

Background information
- Also known as: Musicaly Merchant
- Born: Ricardo Renford Nicholson; 18 March 1981 (age 44); Jamaica
- Origin: Portmore, Jamaica
- Genres: Dancehall; Reggae, Reggae Fusion, Ragga
- Occupations: Musician, songwriter, producer, deejay
- Years active: 2004–present
- Labels: NVUS Records, KVL Records, JAFRICA Records.
- Website: merchanttunes.com

Ricardo Renford Nicholson (born 18 March 1981), better known by his stage names Merchant, and Musicaly Merchant, is a Jamaican reggae and dancehall deejay, writer, and producer.

== Biography ==
=== Early life and career ===
Nicholson was born to parents Charmaine Bowen and Renford Nicholson in Manchester, Jamaica. Nicholson grew up in Manchester, where he attended the Kayda Primary School and later on moved to Kingston in the garrison of Water House, and continued his education at Drew's Avenue All Age School. This is where he started singing at school concerts. At the age of 15, he moved to the coastal city of Portmore in southern Jamaica and where he furthered his schooling at the Waterford Comprehensive High School. While attending school, he and his friends would hold their own concerts during the lunch break beating rhythms on the desk and carrying out deejay battles with each other.

Nicholson comes from a musical family. He is the nephew of well-known singer Derrick Parker, who is famous throughout Jamaica for hits such as "Dem Nuh loyal No More", " Bus Mi Appeal", "How Long", and "Jah Never Fail Wi yet".

=== 2000s ===
While growing up in Portmore, Merchant encountered the musical influences and mentorship from artists such as Busy Signal, Bounty Killer, Konshens, Mad-Cobra, Mavado, Frisco-kid, Singer J and Indica. In 2004, he was encouraged by Indica to enter the B-mobile star search talent competition in Portmore at Ken's Wild flower Lounge and was placed first runner up to roots reggae phenom Gyptian, known worldwide for such hits as "Hold yuh", "Nah Let Go", "Serious Times", "Mama", "Beautiful lady", and "She's My Lady". In that same year, Merchant performed at his first major event – "The West Kingston Jamboree", where world class dancehall and reggae talents such as Beenie Man, Vybz Kartel, and Mavado are regulars. His debut at this event was a major success; It resulted in him becoming a recording artist.

Early on, Merchant currently boasted hit singles such as "Rise Up Mi People", "Badness Nuh Pay" and "Dance the Time Away", which were released in 2011. However, In December 2012, Merchant, released "Move Out Mi tings" which received rave reviews. The inspiration for this song was the then existing conflict between Merchant and his baby's mother. The accompanying music video for the song "Move Out Mi Things" exploded with overwhelming popularity and received heavy rotations on CVM HD, Swag TV, Links TV, TVJ and Hype TV, leading to multiple press features. Since then, he has collaborated with his uncle, Derrick Parker, on "Why Did You Have to Go Away," and with Beenie Man's brother, Kirk Davis, on "Love a Bubble Up", and "Freedom Fighter".

His singles, "Bun A Fire", "Freedom Fighter", and "I Wish" were released on the NVUS Records(NVUS Label) in May 2015.

Nicholson has shown desire to sign with Cash Money Records and Young Money. He has also indicated interest in working with artists such as Iggy Azalea, Miley Cyrus, Lil' Wayne, Nicki Minaj, Rick Ross, DJ Khaled, Tony Bennett and Dolly Parton.

== Controversy ==
=== Family feud ===
On 3 October 2000, the rap duo, Outkast, released the song "Miss Jackson." The song revolves around Andre Benjamin's tumultuous relationship with Erykah Badu and her mother. Merchant's "Move Out Mi Tings" parallels the Outkast song in that he airs the dirty laundry of his personal relationship with his baby's mother. The relationship with that lady went sour when Merchant was doing some overseas business in the Bahamas and his live-in girlfriend was having a relationship with a neighbor. According to Merchant, she sold his personal belongings (moving out with items such as furniture and appliances) and left Jamaica for Barbados. Instead of resorting to violence, Merchant decided to use his lyrical penmanship, and in two days, his masterpiece was completed. When asked about his inspiration for writing the song, Merchant described it as a knee-jerk reaction. He explained: "Because mi very hurt still. She no tell mi seh she move dem. She just do it. When mi come wid mi suitcase, only me and di suitcase inna di house. So instead of we having a physical war, mi just write di song. So if di song buss, mi can move in back some tings. Probably a my luck." The song was highly controversial and made enemies as well as new fans for the embattled Merchant. When Publicist Karla Ashley (from Island Fuse Entertainment) interviewed Merchant’s baby mother, she was not in agreement with Merchant’s recount of events in the song and did not like the fact that their personal relation was aired in public. She explained: "I don't really like the song. I don't think it was truthful. I don't think he should have put it in the public. It needed more information so people would know exactly what took place. It was our private life so it should not have gone public".Nevertheless, motivated by the success of his former reality premised song, Merchant released another single entitled "Joe Grind" (a real life recount of one of his friend’s woman’s infidelity that employs a humorous undertone)

== Discography ==
- "Rock Wid A Lady" (2010)
- "Dance the Time Away" (2011)
- "Badness Nuh Pay" (2011)
- "Rise Up Mi People" (2011)
- "Broke Out" (2011)
- "Wicked So" (2012)
- "Nah Trust Friends" (2012)
- "Jah Is by My Side" (2012)
- "Hard Way" (2012)
- "I Don't Want To Live This Way" (2012)
- "Safe Sex" (2013)
- "Jingle Bell" (2013)
- "Joe Grind" (2013)
- "Summer Time" featuring Spugy B (2013)
- "Bubble Up" featuring Kirk Davis (2013)
- "Dem Nuh Wah Wi Rise" featuring Spugy B (2013)
- "Better Must Come One Day" (2013)
- "Never Walk Away" (2013)
- "Gud Gud Gud" (2013)
- "Pum Pum Gud" (2013)
- "Mr. Bad Mine" (2013)
- "Party & Love Me Self" (2013)
- "Come on Lets Dance Me" (2013)
- "When Jah Rain" (2013)
- "Everything" (2015)
- "Everything Yuh Get" featuring Gud Gyal (2015)
- "Property Fi Lock" (2015)
- "Woman A Mi Life" (2015)
- "Bun A Fire" (2015)
- "Freedom Fighter" (2015)
- "I Wish" (2015)
