= Alexis Warr =

American dancer and choreographer (born 2000)

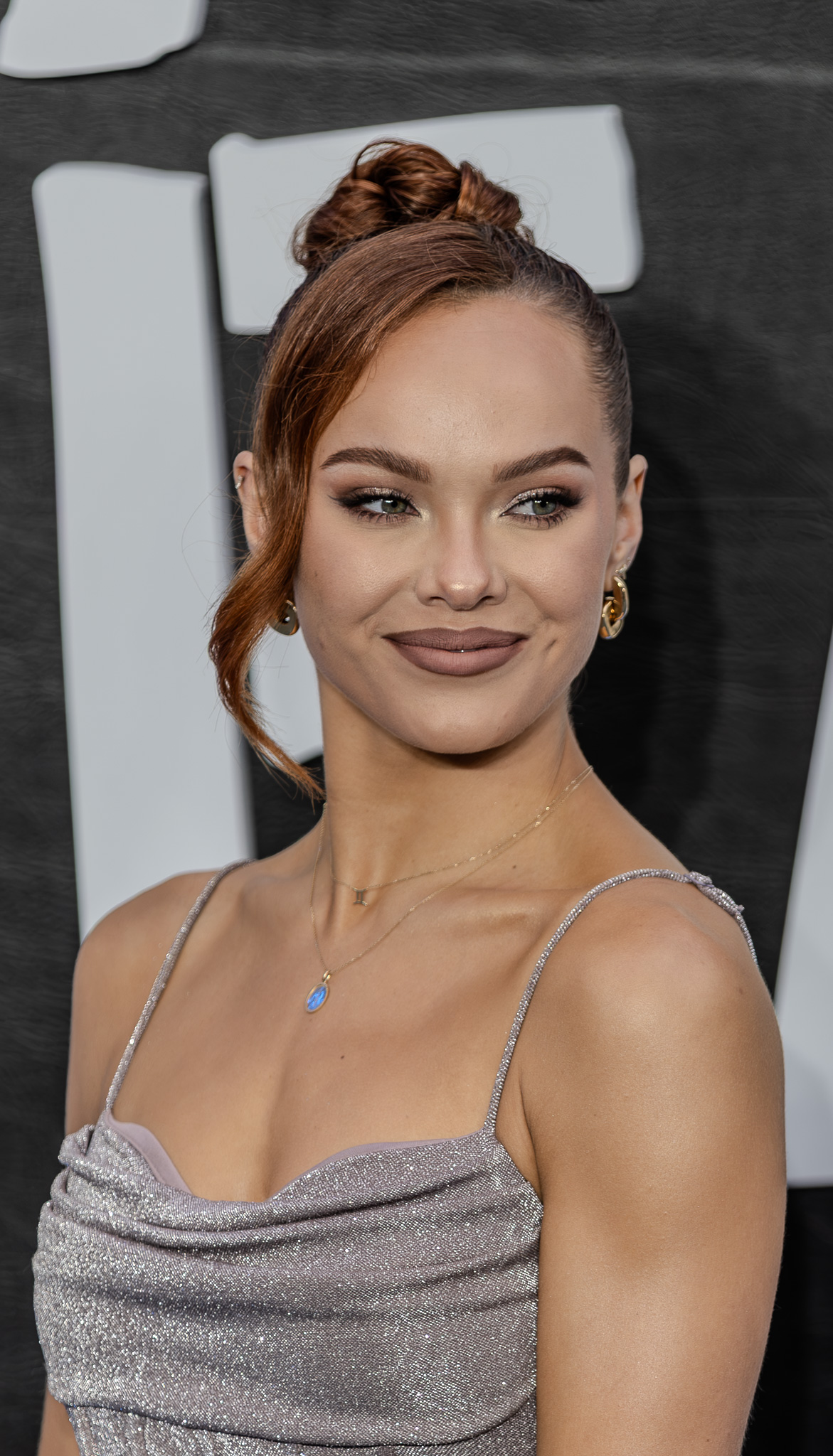
- Warr in 2025
- Born: June 5, 2000 (age 26); Highland, Utah, U.S.
- Other name: Alexis Warr Burton
- Occupations: Dancer; choreographer
- Known for: So You Think You Can Dance; Strictly Come Dancing
- Spouse: Jake Burton (m. 2018; div. 2026)

Alexis Warr (born June 5, 2000) is an American professional dancer and choreographer. She is the first Latin and ballroom dancer to win the competition series So You Think You Can Dance, emerging victorious on its seventeenth season. After appearing as part of the dance troupe on Dancing with the Stars, she became a professional on the British version of the series, Strictly Come Dancing.

== Early and personal life ==
Alexis Warr was born on June 5, 2000, in Highland, Utah. She developed an early interest in dance through watching her sister perform in local musical theater productions. Warr started training at the Center Stage Performing Arts Studio in Orem when she was six years old. She learned ballet and jazz the following year, and added ballroom to her training by the age of thirteen. She is also trained in contemporary, hip hop, tap, and gymnastics.

Warr is a member of the Church of Jesus Christ of Latter-day Saints. She dedicated her So You Think You Can Dance victory to her mother, who was battling brain cancer at the time. Warr married Jake Burton, her high school sweetheart, on November 15, 2018, at the Provo City Center Temple. The couple announced their separation on June 23, 2026, after almost eight years of marriage, and divorced shortly after.

== Career ==
After leaving high school, Warr embarked on her first tour performance with Derek Hough, and subsequently worked as a dancer on America's Got Talent. In 2022, Warr became a contestant on the seventeenth season of So You Think You Can Dance, ultimately going on to be crowned "America's Favorite Dancer". She is the first ballroom-trained dancer to claim the title. Following this, she became a member of the dance troupe on Dancing with the Stars. In 2024, she appeared in the music video for JoJo Siwa's song "Karma".

=== Strictly Come Dancing ===
In July 2025, it was announced that Warr would be joining the twenty-third series of Strictly Come Dancing in the United Kingdom as a professional dancer, alongside Julian Caillon. Following the announcement, Warr said she had "admired Strictly Come Dancing for years, so joining this incredible family is such an honor." For her inaugural series, she was partnered with social media personality George Clarke. They reached the finale and finished as the joint runners-up, alongside Amber Davies and Nikita Kuzmin, on December 20, 2025.

For the twenty-fourth series, Warr was partnered with former professional footballer Shaun Wright-Phillips. They were eliminated during the fifth week of competition on October 25, 2026, finishing in twelfth place.

Series	Partner	Place	Average Score
23	George Clarke	2nd	33.2
24	Shaun Wright-Phillips	12th	20.0

Color key:

Winners
Runners-up
Withdrew

Highest and lowest scoring per dance

Dance	Partner	Highest	Partner	Lowest
American Smooth	George Clarke	24	-	-
Argentine tango	George Clarke	35	-	-
Cha-cha-cha	George Clarke	29	Shaun Wright-Phillips	15
Charleston	George Clarke	37	-	-
Couple's Choice	George Clarke	31	Shaun Wright-Phillips	28
Instant Dance	George Clarke	2	-	-
Foxtrot	-	-	-	-
Jive	George Clarke	27	Shaun Wright-Phillips	17
Paso doble	George Clarke	39	George Clarke	30
Quickstep	George Clarke	34	Shaun Wright-Philips	15
Rumba	George Clarke	29	-	-
Salsa	George Clarke	39	Shaun Wright-Phillips	25
Samba	George Clarke	35	-	-
Showdance	George Clarke	39	-	-
Tango	George Clarke	30	-	-
Viennese waltz	George Clarke	39	George Clarke	34
Waltz	-	-	-	-

- Green number indicates when Alexis and her partner were at the top of the leaderboard.
- Red number indicates when Alexis and her partner were at the bottom of the leaderboard.

==== Series 23 ====
Celebrity partner: George Clarke

Week	Dance	Music	Judges' scores (Note: Individual judges' scores are listed in the following order: Craig Revel Horwood, Motsi Mabuse, Shirley Ballas, Anton Du Beke.)				Total score	Result
1	American Smooth	"Stargazing" — Myles Smith	6	6	6	6	24	No Elimination
2	Paso doble	"Game of Survival" — Ruelle	7	7	8	8	30	Safe
3	Couple's choice	"Soda Pop" from KPop Demon Hunters	6	8	9	8	31	Safe
4	Tango	"Viva la Vida" — Coldplay	7	8	7	8	30	Safe
5	Jive	"As It Was" — Harry Styles	6	7	6	8	27	Safe
6	Cha-cha-cha	"Apple" — Charli XCX	6	7	8	8	29	Safe
7	Viennese waltz	"Somebody to Love" — Queen	8	8	9	9	34	Safe
8	Rumba	"Somewhere Only We Know" — Lily Allen	6	7	8	8	29	Safe
9	Salsa	"Party Rock Anthem" — LMFAO / "Rock This Party" — Bob Sinclar / "Mr. Saxobeat" — Alexandra Stan	9	10	10	10	39	No Elimination
10	Quickstep	"I Get a Kick Out of You" — Frank Sinatra	8	8	9	9	34 (Note: The couple also received two extra points for their Tango to "When Doves Cry" by Prince" in the Instant Dance.)	Safe
11 (Quarterfinals)	Argentine tango	"The Point of No Return" from The Phantom of the Opera	8	9	9	9	35	Safe
12 (Semifinals)	Samba; Charleston	"Volare" — Gipsy Kings "We No Speak Americano" — Yolanda Be Cool	8; 8	9; 9	9; 10	9; 10	35; 37	Safe
13 (Finals)	Viennese waltz Showdance; Paso doble	"Somebody to Love" — Queen "Human" — The Killers "Game of Survival" — Ruelle	9; 9; 9	10; 10; 10	10; 10; 10	10; 10; 10	39; 39; 39	Runner-up

==== Series 24 ====
Celebrity partner: Shaun Wright-Phillips

Week	Dance	Music	Judges' scores (Note: Individual judges' scores are listed in the following order: Craig Revel Horwood, Motsi Mabuse, Shirley Ballas, Anton Du Beke.)				Total score	Result
1	Cha-cha-cha	"Lil Boo Thang" — Paul Russell	2	4	4	5	15	No Elimination
2	Salsa	"You Should Be Dancing" — Bee Gees	4	7	7	7	25	Safe
3	Quickstep	"I'm a Believer" — The Monkees	3	4	3	5	15	Bottom two
4	Couple's choice	"I Got You (I Feel Good)" / "Get Up Offa That Thing" — James Brown	7	7	7	7	28	Safe
5	Jive	"Faith" — Stevie Wonder feat. Ariana Grande	3	5	3	6	17	Eliminated
