= So You Think You Can Dance (American TV series) season 17 =

Seventeenth (2022) season of the American reality show dance competition

So You Think You Can Dance
- Season 17
- Hosted by: Cat Deeley
- Judges: Stephen "tWitch" Boss; JoJo Siwa; Matthew Morrison; Leah Remini
- Winner: Alexis Warr
- Runner-up: Keaton Kermode

Release
- Original network: Fox
- Original release: May 18 – August 10, 2022

Season chronology
- ← Previous; Season 16 Next → Season 18

So You Think You Can Dance is an American dance competition reality show, which returned for its seventeenth season on May 18, 2022.

A 17th season of So You Think You Can Dance had originally been set to air in the summer of 2020, with a judging panel composed of series creator Nigel Lythgoe (his seventeenth consecutive season as judge), Mary Murphy and Laurieann Gibson. However, in June 2020 the show was postponed indefinitely due to the COVID-19 pandemic. The season was finally produced in the summer of 2022, now with an entirely different set of judges: freestyle hip-hop dancer Stephen "tWitch" Boss, who had been a Season 4 runner-up and Season 15 judge; entertainer and YouTube celebrity JoJo Siwa; and actor Matthew Morrison. Cat Deeley returned to her role as host for a sixteenth consecutive season.

In May 2022, Morrison was fired from the show, after having sent direct messages on social media to a female contestant that were deemed by producers to be inappropriate. He was replaced by actress Leah Remini, starting with the season's fifth episode.

On August 10, 2022, Alexis Warr was crowned "America's Favorite Dancer", making her the first ballroom dance contestant to win the show. (While Season 2 winner Benji Schwimmer was also a partner dancer, his specialty, West Coast Swing, is generally not considered a ballroom dance). Warr and fellow grand finalist Keaton Kermode who were paired as a couple from the first performance episode, only Kermode became the forty-second contestant in the show's run never to face elimination from being among the bottom six or bottom four contestants, and became the thirty-third contestant to be in the grand finale to never to face elimination from being among the bottom six or bottom four.

This was the final season to feature Stephen "tWitch" Boss, prior to his death in December 2022.

== Auditions ==
Initial auditions, for dancers ages 18 to 30, were due to begin in March 2020 but were postponed amid in the beginning of the COVID-19 pandemic. Auditions would likely be continued for this season during the delay. Those who were originally submitted in 2020 and could be getting an extended age limit to 32. Production was rescheduled for March 2022 including the start of auditions.

== Choreography Round ==
This season, the Callbacks/Academy Round was renamed the Choreography Round and took place over the course of one day, as opposed to one week like past seasons. The Choreography Round consisted of three rounds led by creative producer/choreographer, Mandy Moore. The first round had the contestants dancing in their own style, the second round focused on partner work and the third round was a group routine. 42 contestants made it to the choreography round and contestants were eliminated after each round until 12 remained to advance to the studio shows.

== Contestants ==
=== Top 12 contestants ===
==== Female contestants ====
Contestant	Age	Home town	Dance style	Elimination date	Placement
Alexis Warr	21	Orem, Utah	Latin Ballroom	N/A	Winner
Essence Wilmington	20	Davenport, Iowa	Hip Hop	August 3, 2022	Top 3
Ralyn Johnson	18	Walker, Louisiana	Contemporary	July 27, 2022	Top 6
Anna Miller	18	San Ramon, California	Contemporary	July 13, 2022	Top 8
Jordan Betscher	24	Cincinnati, Ohio	Jazz	June 29, 2022	Top 10
Virginia Crouse	21	Hammond, Louisiana	Contemporary	June 22, 2022	Top 12

==== Male contestants ====
Contestant	Age	Home town	Dance style	Elimination date	Placement
Keaton Kermode	20	Fairland, Indiana	Contemporary	August 10, 2022	Runner-Up
Beau Harmon	23	Kennesaw, Georgia	Musical Theater	July 27, 2022	Top 6
Carter Williams	20	Sandy, Utah	Latin Ballroom	July 27, 2022	Top 6
Waverly Fredericks	20	Washington Heights, New York	Contemporary	July 13, 2022	Top 8
Thiago Pacheco	18	Boston, Massachusetts	Contemporary	June 29, 2022	Top 10
James "Lord Finn" Thomas	26	Chicago, Illinois	Hip Hop	June 22, 2022	Top 12

== Elimination chart ==
Contestants are listed in chronological order of elimination.

Legend
Female	Male	Bottom 3/4 contestants	Eliminated

Result show date:	6/15	6/22	6/29	7/13	7/20	7/27	8/3	8/10
Contestant	Results							
Alexis Warr			Btm 4		Btm 3			Winner
Keaton Kermode								Runner-Up
Essence Wilmington	Btm 4						Elim	
Beau Harmon				Btm 4	Btm 3	Elim		
Carter Williams	Btm 4		Btm 4			Elim		
Ralyn Johnson				Btm 4	Btm 3	Elim		
Anna Miller				Elim				
Waverly Fredericks		Btm 4		Elim				
Jordan Betscher		Btm 4	Elim					
Thiago Pacheco	Btm 4		Elim					
James "Lord Finn" Thomas		Elim						
Virginia Crouse	Btm 4	Elim						

== Studio shows ==
Once again, the Bottom 2 vote-getters of each gender will face elimination & the judges vote, with one female & one male leaving each round. However, for the first time this series only the studio audience can vote for which contestant should remain in the competition.

=== Top 12 Perform Part 1 – The Male Dancers Dozen (June 15, 2022) ===
- Group Routine: Top 12: "Bussin" – Nicki Minaj & Lil Baby (Hip Hop; Choreographer: Luther Brown)

In this round, each pair danced a routine in the Main Style of the Male Pair. This is the 300th episode of the show. No elimination took place this week.

Couple	Style	Music	Choreographer(s)	Results
Virginia Crouse	Hip Hop	"Drop It Like It's Hot" — Snoop Dogg ft. Pharrell Williams	Luther Brown	Bottom 4
James "Lord Finn" Thomas	Hip Hop	"Drop It Like It's Hot" — Snoop Dogg ft. Pharrell Williams	Luther Brown	Safe
Jordan Betscher	Contemporary	"Bob in the Rain and the Lizard of Hope" — Tom Rosenthal	Mandy Korpinen & Elizabeth Petrin	Safe
Waverly Fredericks	Contemporary	"Bob in the Rain and the Lizard of Hope" — Tom Rosenthal	Mandy Korpinen & Elizabeth Petrin	Safe
Anna Miller	Broadway	"Dancing in the Dark" — Frank Sinatra	Al Blackstone	Safe
Beau Harmon	Broadway	"Dancing in the Dark" — Frank Sinatra	Al Blackstone	Safe
Essence Wilmington	Contemporary	"No More 'I Love You's'" — Annie Lennox	Tessandra Chavez	Bottom 4
Thiago Pacheco	Contemporary	"No More 'I Love You's'" — Annie Lennox	Tessandra Chavez	Bottom 4
Ralyn Johnson	Jive	"I'm Still Standing" — Elton John	Alan Bersten	Safe
Carter Williams	Jive	"I'm Still Standing" — Elton John	Alan Bersten	Bottom 4
Alexis Warr	Contemporary	"Rome" — Dermot Kennedy	Talia Favia	Safe
Keaton Kermode	Contemporary	"Rome" — Dermot Kennedy	Talia Favia	Safe

=== Top 12 Perform Part 2 – Girl's Night Out (June 22, 2022) ===
- Group Routine: Top 12: "Aura" – Lady Gaga (Pop-Jazz; Choreographer: Brian Friedman)

Each pair will now dance the main style of the Female Pair. Two contestant (each gender: one female & one male) will go home at the end of the show

Couple	Style	Music	Choreographer(s)	Results
Ralyn Johnson	Contemporary	"Mindless Town" — Roman Lewis	Teddy Forance	Safe
Carter Williams	Contemporary	"Mindless Town" — Roman Lewis	Teddy Forance	Safe
Alexis Warr	Cha Cha	"I Like It Like That (Uproot Andy Remix)" — Pete Rodriguez	Pasha Pashkov & Daniella Karagach	Safe
Keaton Kermode	Cha Cha	"I Like It Like That (Uproot Andy Remix)" — Pete Rodriguez	Pasha Pashkov & Daniella Karagach	Safe
Virginia Crouse	Contemporary	"Eight" — Sleeping At Last	Jaci Royal	Eliminated
James "Lord Finn" Thomas	Contemporary	"Eight" — Sleeping At Last	Jaci Royal	Eliminated
Jordan Betscher	Jazz	"Can't Buy Me Love" — Michael Bublé	Dominique Kelley	Bottom 4
Waverly Fredericks	Jazz	"Can't Buy Me Love" — Michael Bublé	Dominique Kelley	Bottom 4
Anna Miller	Contemporary	"exile" — Taylor Swift ft. Bon Iver	Talia Favia	Safe
Beau Harmon	Contemporary	"exile" — Taylor Swift ft. Bon Iver	Talia Favia	Safe
Essence Wilmington	Hip Hop	"The One" — Mary J. Blige ft. Drake	Mel Charlot	Safe
Thiago Pacheco	Hip Hop	"The One" — Mary J. Blige ft. Drake	Mel Charlot	Safe

=== Top 10 Perform – Around the World (June 29, 2022) ===
This week, the Top 10 contestants were assigned new pairs & danced styles originating from different countries around the world

Couple	Style	Country of origin	Music	Choreographer(s)	Results
Anna Miller	Salsa	Havana, Cuba	"Don't Go Yet" — Camila Cabello	Jonathan & Oksana Platero	Safe
Carter Williams	Salsa	Havana, Cuba	"Don't Go Yet" — Camila Cabello	Jonathan & Oksana Platero	Bottom 4
Essence Wilmington	Bollywood	Mumbai, India	"Chikni Chameli" — Agneepath (Original Motion Picture Soundtrack)	Achinta S. McDaniel	Safe
Waverly Fredericks	Bollywood	Mumbai, India	"Chikni Chameli" — Agneepath (Original Motion Picture Soundtrack)	Achinta S. McDaniel	Safe
Jordan Betscher	Viennese Waltz	Vienna, Austria	"Fall On Me" — Andrea Bocelli & Matteo Bocelli	Sasha Farber & Emma Slater	Eliminated
Beau Harmon	Viennese Waltz	Vienna, Austria	"Fall On Me" — Andrea Bocelli & Matteo Bocelli	Sasha Farber & Emma Slater	Safe
Ralyn Johnson	African Jazz	Nairobi, Kenya	"Into The Light" — District 78 & Sean Cheesman	Sean Cheesman	Safe
Keaton Kermode	African Jazz	Nairobi, Kenya	"Into The Light" — District 78 & Sean Cheesman	Sean Cheesman	Safe
Alexis Warr	Broadway	New York City, United States	"City Lights" — Liza Minnelli	Al Blackstone	Bottom 4
Thiago Pacheco	Broadway	New York City, United States	"City Lights" — Liza Minnelli	Al Blackstone	Eliminated

=== Top 8 Perform – Turn Back Time (July 13, 2022) ===
The top eight contestants were once again given new pairs & performed a routine inspired by a previous decade, as well as a solo in their own style

==== Duet ====
Couple	Style	Decade	Music	Choreographer(s)	Results
Ralyn Johnson	Jazz	1950's	"I Want You To Be My Baby" — Georgia Gibbs	Jonathan Redavid	Bottom 4
Beau Harmon	Jazz	1950's	"I Want You To Be My Baby" — Georgia Gibbs	Jonathan Redavid	Bottom 4
Essence Wilmington	Disco	1970's	"Boogie Wonderland" — Earth, Wind, & Fire	Doriana Sanchez	Safe
Keaton Kermode	Disco	1970's	"Boogie Wonderland" — Earth, Wind, & Fire	Doriana Sanchez	Safe
Waverly Fredericks	Pop-Jazz	1980's	"Straight Up" — Paula Abdul	Sean Cheesman	Eliminated
Anna Miller	Pop-Jazz	1980's	"Straight Up" — Paula Abdul	Sean Cheesman	Eliminated
Alexis Warr	Contemporary	1990's	"I Have Nothing" — Whitney Houston	Robert Roldan (season 7)	Safe
Carter Williams	Contemporary	1990's	"I Have Nothing" — Whitney Houston	Robert Roldan (season 7)	Safe

==== Top 8 contestant's solos ====
Contestant	Style	Music
Waverly Fredericks	Contemporary	"Throne" — ASADI
Anna Miller	Contemporary	"Me and Bobbie McGee" — Janis Joplin
Carter Williams	Latin Ballroom	"Bailar" — Deorro ft. Elvis Crespo
Alexis Warr	Latin Ballroom	"Sax" — Fleur East
Beau Harmon	Musical Theater	"Big Spender" — Shirley Bassey
Ralyn Johnson	Contemporary	"Nicest Thing" — Kate Nash
Keaton Kermode	Contemporary	"I've Been Loving You Too Long" — Otis Redding
Essence Wilmington	Hip Hop	"Look At Me Now" — Chris Brown ft. Busta Rhymes & Lil Wayne

=== Top 6 Perform Part 1 – Starry Starry Night (July 20, 2022) ===
- Group Routine: Top 6 & All-Stars: "The Chain" – Fleetwood Mac (Contemporary; Choreographers: Mandy Korpinen & Elizabeth Petrin)

Since the judges could not reach a decision, no contestant was eliminated this week.

Couples	Style	Music	Choreographer(s)	Results
Carter Williams; Bailey Munoz	Hip Hop	"Alive" — Lil Jon, Offset & 2 Chainz	Gabe de Guzman	Safe
Alexis Warr; Amy Yakima	Jazz	"Escalate" — Tsar B	Ellenore Scott (season 6)	Bottom 3
Keaton Kermode; Ezra Sosa	Jive	"King Creole (Viva Mix)" — Elvis Presley	Sasha Farber & Emma Slater	Safe
Essence Wilmington; Koine Iwasaki	Contemporary	"Slow Me Down" — Emmy Rossum	Jaci Royal	Safe
Beau Harmon; Lex Ishimoto	Contemporary	"Say I'm Sober" — Billy Lockett	Talia Favia	Bottom 3
Ralyn Johnson; Comfort Fedoke	Hip Hop	"Blick Blick" — Coi Leray & Nicki Minaj	Luther Brown	Bottom 3

=== Top 6 Perform Part 2 – Quarter-Finals - Head 2 Head (July 27, 2022) ===
- Trios:
  - Top 3 Female Contestants: "Woman" – Doja Cat (Hip-hop; Choreographer: Mel Charlot)
  - Top 3 Male Contestants: "Mr. Pinstripe Suit" – Big Bad Voodoo Daddy (Broadway; Choreographer: Dominique Kelley)
  - Carter, Ralyn, & Beau: "Please Turn Green" – Teddy Swims (Contemporary; Choreographer: Chase Haley Bowden)
  - Alexis, Essence, & Keaton: "Why Don't You Do Right?" – Julie London (Jazz; Choreographer: Jonathan Redavid)

==== Head to Head Solos ====
New to the series, each contestant was paired against each other in a head to head dance off. The loser of each pair is eliminated. There were no judge's saves this week.

===== Round 1 =====
Contestants	Style	Music	Results
Carter Williams	Jive	"Proud Mary" — Tina Turner	Eliminated
Alexis Warr	Cha Cha/Paso Doble	"Do It To It" — Acraze ft. Cherish	Safe

===== Round 2 =====
Contestants	Style	Music	Results
Essence Wilmington	Hip Hop	"Dior" — Pop Smoke	Safe
Ralyn Johnson	Contemporary	"We Don't Eat" — James Vincent McMorrow	Eliminated

===== Round 3 =====
Contestants	Style	Music	Results
Beau Harmon	Musical Theater	"That's Life" — Frank Sinatra	Eliminated
Keaton Kermode	Contemporary	"At This Moment" — Billy Vera and the Beaters	Safe

=== Top 3 Perform – Semi-Finals – The Final Cut (August 3, 2022) ===
Each contestants performed a duet with their fellow contestants as well as a duet in their own style with an All Star.

Contestants	Style	Music	Choreographer(s)	Results
Alexis Warr	Bollywood (w/ Keaton Kermode)	"Jai Jai Siva Sankaraa" — Benny Dayal & Nakash Aziz	Nakul Dev Mahajan	Safe
Alexis Warr	Contemporary (w/ Essence Wilmington)	"Hero" — Mariah Carey	Chase Haley Bowden	Safe
Alexis Warr	Argentine Tango (w/ Kiki Nyemchek)	"Obertura" — Forever Tango	Leonardo Barrionuevo & Miriam Larici	Safe
Essence Wilmington	Contemporary (w/ Alexis Warr)	"Hero" — Mariah Carey	Chase Haley Bowden	Eliminated
Essence Wilmington	Hip Hop (w/ Robert Green)	"Wipe Me Down" — Lil Boosie ft. Foxx & Webbie	Mel Charlot	Eliminated
Essence Wilmington	Jazz (w/ Keaton Kermode)	"Vibe Check" — District 78 & Leah Levi	Ellenore Scott (season 6)	Eliminated
Keaton Kermode	Bollywood (w/ Alexis Warr)	"Jai Jai Siva Sankaraa" — Benny Dayal & Nakash Aziz	Nakul Dev Mahajan	Safe
Keaton Kermode	Contemporary (w/ Audrey Case)	"A Song For You" — Donny Hathaway	Robert Roldan (season 7)	Safe
Keaton Kermode	Jazz (w/ Essence Wilmington)	"Vibe Check" — District 78 & Leah Levi	Ellenore Scott (season 6)	Safe

=== The Season 17 Finale (August 10, 2022) ===
Each of the grand-finalists performed four times: a duet with a fellow Top 12 contestant of their choice, a duet outside of their style with an All Star, a solo and in a duet with each other.

- Group Routine: Top 12 & Judges: "Instruction (feat. Demi Lovato & Stefflon Don)" — Jax Jones (Pop-Jazz; Choreographer: Brian Friedman)

Contestant	Style	Music	Choreographer(s)	Results
Alexis Warr	Samba (w/ Carter Williams)	Samba — Gloria Estefan	Sasha Farber & Emma Slater	Winner
Alexis Warr	Contemporary (w/ Jason Glover)	"The End." — November Ultra	Robert Roldan (season 7)	Winner
Alexis Warr	Jazz (w/ Keaton Kermode)	"Snake" — Rony Rex feat. Nani Castle	Brian Friedman	Winner
Keaton Kermode	Contemporary (w/ Anna Miller)	"Stayaway (Recorded at Electric Lady Studios NYC)" — MUNA	Talia Favia	Runner-Up
Keaton Kermode	Hip Hop (w/ Lex Ishimoto)	"Going Bad" — Meek Mill feat. Drake	Nika Kljun	Runner-Up
Keaton Kermode	Jazz (w/ Alexis Warr)	"Snake" — Rony Rex feat. Nani Castle	Brian Friedman	Runner-Up

=== Solos ===
Contestant	Style	Music	Results
Alexis Warr	Samba	"Machika" — J Balvin, Jeon & Anitta	Winner
Keaton Kermode	Contemporary	"Love On The Brain" — Noah Guthrie	Runner-Up

== Ratings ==
=== U.S. Nielsen ratings ===
Show	Episode	First air date	Rating (18–49)	Share (18–49)	Viewers (millions)	Rank (timeslot)	Rank (night)
1	Dance is Back! Auditions Show 1	May 18, 2022	0.3	3	2.07	3	8
2	Auditions Show 2	May 25, 2022	0.3	2	1.26	3 (tied)	8 (tied)
3	Auditions Show 3	June 1, 2022	0.3	3	1.60	4	9 (tied)
4	The Big Cut – Choreography Round	June 8, 2022	0.3	2	1.40	3	12 (tied)
5	The Dancers Dozen	June 15, 2022	0.3	3	1.74	2	9 (tied)
6	Girls Night Out	June 22, 2022	0.3	3	1.54	4	12
7	Around the World	June 29, 2022	0.3	3	1.51	4	12
8	Turn Back Time	July 13, 2022	0.3	3	1.55	3	6
9	Starry Starry Night	July 20, 2022	0.3	3	1.40	4 (tied)	9 (tied)
10	Head 2 Head	July 27, 2022	0.3	3	1.54	3	7
11	The Final Cut	August 3, 2022	0.2	2	1.49	4	13
12	The Season 17 Finale	August 10, 2022	0.3	3	1.46	3	10
