= Amber Davies =

Welsh actress (born 1996)

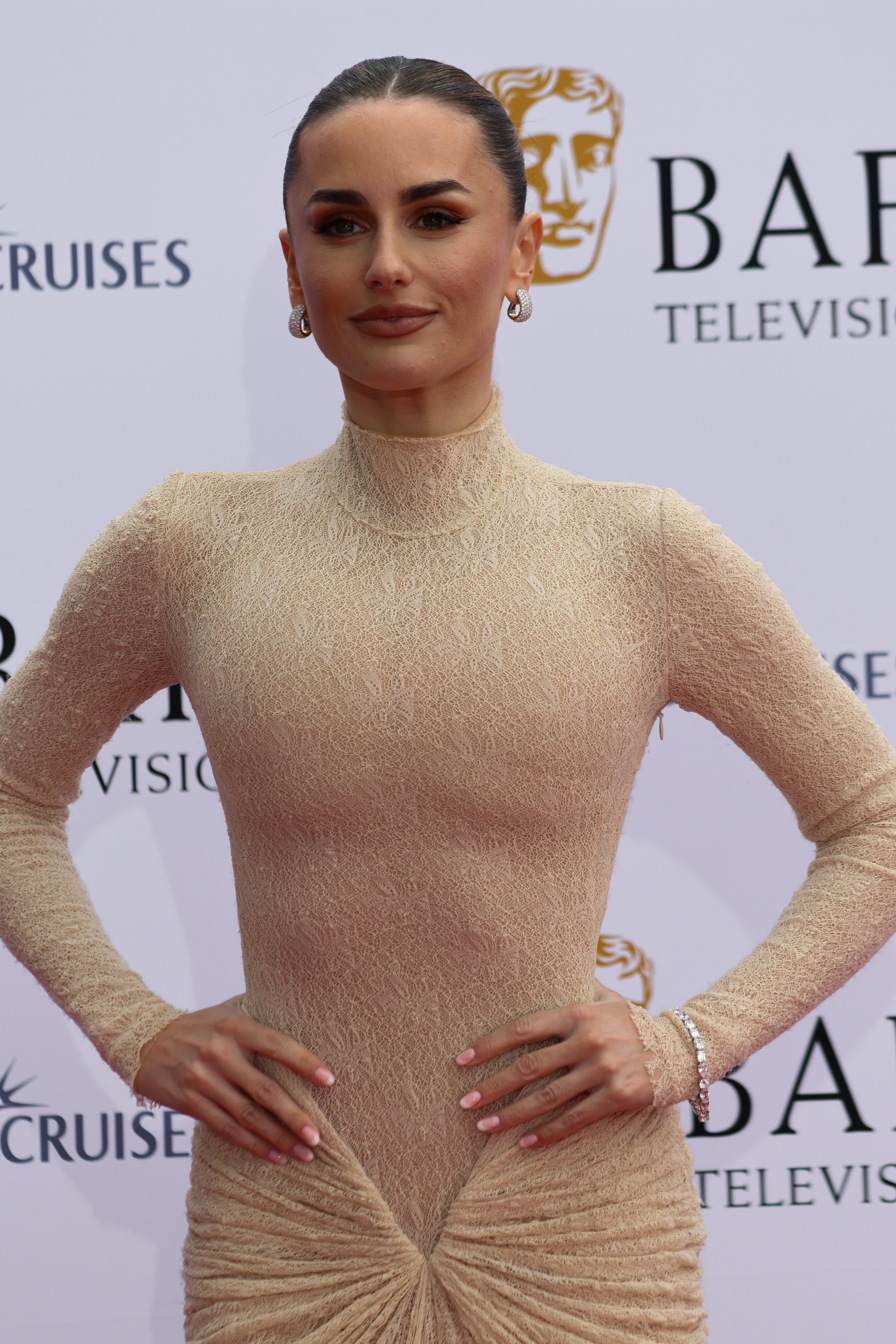
- Davies at the 2026 British Academy Television Awards
- Born: Amber Elizabeth Davies; 4 October 1996 (age 30); Denbigh, Wales, United Kingdom
- Education: Urdang Academy
- Occupations: Actress; television personality; podcaster
- Years active: 2017–present

Amber Elizabeth Davies (born 4 October 1996) is a British actress and reality television personality from Denbigh, Wales. Davies won the third series of the ITV2 reality television programme Love Island in 2017 and has since gone on to pursue a career in musical theatre and acting.

Davies has appeared in theatre productions, with her roles including appearances in 9 to 5: The Musical, Bring It On: The Musical, Back to the Future: The Musical, Pretty Woman, The Great Gatsby and Legally Blonde. She also appeared in the CBBC television series Almost Never and competed in the sixteenth series of Dancing on Ice in 2024. She was a runner up on the twenty-third series of Strictly Come Dancing in 2025.

== Early life ==
Davies was born on 4 October 1996 in Denbigh. Her father is a plumber and her mother is a mental health nurse; she grew up in a working-class background. In her hometown, she was taught by singer and music coach Leah Owen. She attended Ysgol Glan Clwyd for secondary education, and at the age of 16 gained a scholarship to train in musical theatre at the Urdang Academy in London. She worked in the London nightclub Cirque Le Soir, as well as singing backing vocals for The X Factor before she began her television career professionally.

== Career ==
In 2017, Davies won the third series of Love Island alongside Kem Cetinay. Soon after, she released a lingerie range with Boux Avenue. In the same year, she launched a clothing range with Motel Rocks whilst acting as an ambassador for the brand. Davies then appeared as herself in several television series, including And They're Off!, All Together Now, The One Show, as well as documentaries such as Amber & Dolly: 9 to 5 and When Reality TV Goes Horribly Wrong. The former documented her stage debut in 9 to 5: The Musical as she began to pursue acting professionally.

After her role as Judy Bernly in 9 to 5: The Musical throughout 2019, Davies was cast in Bring It On: The Musical in 2021. That same year, she was cast in the CBBC television series Almost Never, portraying the recurring role of Jess in the final series. Davies then starred in Back to the Future: The Musical in 2022, followed by her role in Pretty Woman throughout 2023. In 2024, Davies appeared as a contestant on the sixteenth series of Dancing on Ice. She was paired with Simon Proulx-Sénécal and was eighth to be eliminated. Later that year, she began hosting Call to Stage, a podcast about theatre.

In February 2025, it was announced that Davies would be playing Jordan Baker in the West End and European premiere of The Great Gatsby, alongside Jamie Muscato, Frances Mayli McCann, Corbin Bleu and more at the London Coliseum from April 2025. And winning the What’s on Stage Award for her supporting role as Jordan Baker. Following the role, she was cast as Elle Woods in the 2026 UK tour of Legally Blonde. A day after her casting was announced, she was confirmed to be competing in the twenty-third series of Strictly Come Dancing, as a replacement for Dani Dyer, who withdrew due to a fractured ankle. She was partnered with Nikita Kuzmin, and the couple finished as joint runners-up on the show alongside George Clarke and Alexis Warr.

== Filmography ==
Year	Title	Role	Notes	Ref.
2017	Love Island	Herself	Contestant; winner	
2017	GMB Today	Herself	Entertainment editor	
2017	When Reality TV Goes Horribly Wrong	Herself	Contributor	
2018	And They're Off!	Herself	Main cast	
2018	Celebrity Ghost Hunt	Herself	Main cast	
2018	CelebAbility	Herself	Contestant	
2018	Pointless Celebrities	Herself	Contestant	
2018	All Together Now	Herself	Contestant	
2019	The One Show	Herself	Guest appearance	
2019	Amber & Dolly: 9 to 5	Herself	Lead role	
2019	This Morning	Herself	Guest appearance	
2019	Hey Tracey!	Herself	Panelist	
2019	I'm a Celebrity: Extra Camp	Herself	Guest appearance	
2019	Lorraine	Herself	Guest appearance	
2021	Almost Never	Jess	Recurring role	
2024	Dancing on Ice	Herself	Contestant	
2024–present	Call to Stage	Host	Podcast series	
2025	Strictly Come Dancing	Herself	Contestant; runner up	

== Stage ==
Year	Title	Role	Venue	Ref.
2019	9 to 5: The Musical	Judy Bernly	Savoy Theatre & UK tour	
2021–2022	Bring It On: The Musical	Campbell Davis	Southbank Centre & UK tour	
2022–2023	Back to the Future: The Musical	Lorraine Baines McFly	Adelphi Theatre	
2023–2024	Pretty Woman: The Musical	Vivian Ward	UK tour	
2025	The Great Gatsby	Jordan Baker	London Coliseum	
2026–2027	Legally Blonde	Elle Woods	UK tour & London Coliseum	
