= Mausam =

Mausam may refer to:

== People ==
- Mausam Khatri, Indian freestyle wrestler
- Mausam Noor, Indian politician

== Geography ==
- Mausam River, in Nashik District, Maharashtra, India

== Arts and entertainment ==
- Mausam (1975 film), 1975 Indian romantic drama film by Gulzar, starring Sanjeev Kumar and Sharmila Tagore
- Mausam (2011 film), 2011 Indian romantic drama film by Pankaj Kapur, starring Shahid Kapoor and Sonam Kapoor
  - Mausam (soundtrack), its soundtrack by Pritam Chakraborty
- Mausam (TV series), Pakistani drama
- Mausam (JoSH album)
- Mausam (Sonu Nigam album), a 1999 album by Indian singer Sonu Nigam

== Others ==
- Project Mausam, Indian cultural and economic project to connect countries on the Indian Ocean

== See also ==
- Moushumi (disambiguation)
- Monsoon (disambiguation)
- Mausami Gurung, Indian singer
- Mousampur, a village in Rajasthan, India
