= We Died, They Remixed =

Remix album by Architecture in Helsinki
- Released: 28 October 2006
- Recorded: 2006
- Genre: Indie pop
- Length: 58:16
- Label: Tailem Bend, Bar/None
- Producer: Various

Architecture in Helsinki chronology
In Case We Die (2005)	We Died, They Remixed (2006)	Places Like This (2007)

Professional ratings
Review scores
Source	Rating
Pitchfork	4.4/10

We Died, They Remixed is a 2006 remix album of Australian band Architecture in Helsinki's 2005 release, In Case We Die. Each track from In Case We Die was remixed, with "Do the Whirlwind" featured twice. "Like a Call", from their 2003 debut, Fingers Crossed, is also included.

== Track listing ==
1. "Do the Whirlwind" – 4:38 (Safety Scissors)
2. "It'5!" (Poutine Dream Mix) – 4:49 (33 Hz & Ming)
3. "Wishbone" – 3:39 (Franc Tetaz)
4. "Neverevereverdid" (Cave Rave Remix) – 4:14 (YACHT)
5. "Frenchy I'm Faking" (DAT Politics Remix) – 2:35
6. "Tiny Paintings" (Tiny Paintings Remix) – 4:03 (Squeak E. Clean & Koool G Murder)
7. "The Cemetery" (Cemetery Sass Emerary) – 2:56 (New Buffalo)
8. "In Case We Die" – 3:52 (DJ Mehdi)
9. "Do the Whirlwind" – 4:38 (Hot Chip)
10. "Need to Shout" – 3:20 (Mocky)
11. "Maybe You Can Owe Me" – 3:38 (Qua)
12. "What's in Store?" (Up All Night Remix) – 4:00 (Mountains in the Sky)
13. "Rendezvous: Potrero Hill" (Isan Three Point Four Five Five Mix) – 6:28 (Isan)
14. "Like a Call" (Buy Me Now I'm Cheap Remix) – 5:20 (Jeremy Dower)
