= Like It or Not =

Like It or Not may refer to:

- "Like It or Not" (song), a song by Genesis from the album Abacab
- "Like It or Not", a song by Madonna from the album Confessions on a Dance Floor
- "Like It or Not", a song by Status Quo from the album Thirsty Work
- Like It or Not (album), a compilation album by American alternative rock band Caroline's Spine
- Like It or Not (EP), an EP by Architecture in Helsinki
- "...like it or not", a 2008 notable speech by Mayor Gavin Newsom which unintentionally contributed to the passage of California Proposition 8
