= Like It or Not (EP) =

EP by Architecture in Helsinki
- Released: July 8, 2008
- Recorded: March 2008
- Genre: Indie rock, indie pop
- Length: 17:14
- Label: Polyvinyl Records

Architecture in Helsinki chronology
Places Like This (2007)	Like It or Not (2008)	Moment Bends (2011)

Professional ratings
Review scores
Source	Rating
AllMusic	2.5/5 stars
Robert Christgau	(choice cut)
Consequence of Sound	C–
PopMatters	5/10 stars
Punknews.org	3/5 stars

Like It or Not is an EP by indie pop group Architecture in Helsinki, released on July 8, 2008. It features two remixes of the titular song, which originally appeared on the 2007 album Places Like This.

== Track listing ==
1. Like It or Not (Version 2)
2. Beef in Box
3. One Heavy February 2008
4. Hold Music
5. Like It or Not (El Guincho Remix)
