= Captured (Caroline's Spine album) =

Studio album by Caroline's Spine
- Released: January 15, 2007
- Recorded: September–December 2006
- Genre: Alternative rock
- Label: 7th Kid Entertainment
- Producer: Caroline's Spine, Dave Percefull, Ed Knoll

Caroline's Spine chronology
The Collection (2006)	Captured (2007)	Work It Out (2008)

Captured is the seventh studio album by American alternative rock band Caroline's Spine. It was the first album to feature entirely new material since 1999's Attention Please.

== Track listing ==
1. "Pieces" - 2:51
2. "Instrument of Change" - 3:56
3. "Show Me" - 4:05
4. "Answer" - 5:40
5. "Unreal" - 6:08
6. "Cannot Be Captured" - 3:09
7. "Bang" - 3:27
8. "Wasted" - 3:58
9. "Anxious" - 3:53
10. "Lost" - 2:55
11. "Believer of Me" - 3:54
12. "Last Goodbye" - 5:29
13. "?" - 3:42

== Band Lineup ==
- Jimmy Newquist - vocals, guitar
- Mark Haugh - guitar, backing vocals
- Scott Jones - bass, backing vocals
- Jason Gilardi - drums
