= Moushumi (disambiguation) =

Moushumi (born 1972) is a Bangladeshi film actress.

Moushumi may also refer to:

- Moushumi Bhowmik (born 1964), Indian singer
- Moushumi Chatterjee (born 1960), Indian actress
- Moushumi Hamid (born 1988), Bangladeshi film and TV actress
- Moushumi Kandali, Indian writer and historian
- Moushumi Nag, Bangladeshi TV actress
- Moushumi Saha, Indian television actress

== See also ==
- Mausam (disambiguation)
- Mausami, alternative spelling of the Indian feminine given name
- Mousami, a citrus lime
- Mousumi Banerjee, Indian-American statistician and singer
- Mausumi Dikpati, Indian astronomer
- Mousumi Murmu, Indian footballer
- Moushaumi Robinson (born 1981), American track and field athlete
