= Work It Out (album) =

Studio album by Caroline's Spine
- Released: September 16, 2008
- Recorded: 2008 in Austin, Texas and Scottsdale, Arizona
- Genre: Alternative rock
- Label: 7th Kid Entertainment
- Producer: Jimmy Newquist; Nick DiDia; Dave Percifull

Caroline's Spine chronology
Captured (2007)	Work It Out (album) (2008)

Work It Out is the eighth studio album by American alternative rock band Caroline's Spine. The album's second track, "The Light Inside," served as the album's lead single in late 2008.

In 2008, Newquist recorded Work It Out in Austin, Texas and Scottsdale, Arizona. Newquist serves as the only original band member featured on the album and worked with Nick DiDia to create the "melodic train wreck." The lead single, "The Light Inside," found national radio play in late 2008 and would rank as the second most downloaded song in Caroline's Spine's history, placing it just under their biggest hit, "Sullivan."

A US tour in promotion of Work It Out began on August 31, 2008, and continued into 2009 with concerts in North America and Europe.

== Track listing ==
1. "Work It Out" - 3:21
2. "The Light Inside" - 3:27
3. "Take My Heart" - 3:32
4. "What I Like" - 3:14
5. "Alone With You" - 3:52
6. "Bombs Away" - 3:28
7. "Seed to Sow" - 3:36
8. "When You Go" - 3:57

== Band Lineup ==
- Jimmy Newquist - vocals, guitar, keys
- Matt McHan - guitar
- Jeff Rambo - bass guitar
- Dave Kendziora - drums
