= In Case We Die =

Studio album by Architecture in Helsinki
- Released: 5 April 2005
- Recorded: 21 June 2004 – 26 January 2005
- Studio: Super Melody World
- Genre: Indie pop
- Length: 40:04
- Label: Tailem Bend/Inertia, Bar/None, Moshi Moshi
- Producer: The Carbohydrates (James Cecil, Cameron Bird)

Architecture in Helsinki chronology
Fingers Crossed (2003)	In Case We Die (2005)	We Died, They Remixed (2006)

Singles from In Case We Die
- 1. "Do the Whirlwind" Released: 2005; 2. "Maybe You Can Owe Me" Released: 2005; 3. "It'5!" Released: 2005

In Case We Die is the second studio album by Australian indie pop band Architecture in Helsinki which was released on 5 April 2005. It was produced by band members James Cecil and Cameron Bird under their other moniker, The Carbohydrates. In Case We Die appeared on the ARIA Albums Chart Top 100.

At the J Award of 2005, the album was nominated for Australian Album of the Year.

At the ARIA Music Awards of 2005, the album received three nominations Best Independent Release, Best Cover Art and Best Adult Contemporary Album.

== Background ==
In 2005, Australian band, Architecture in Helsinki, issued their second album In Case We Die on their own Tailem Bend label (distributed by Inertia Records). The ensemble consisted of eight members: Cameron Bird on lead vocals, guitars, and percussion; James Cecil on drums, backing vocals, guitars, keyboards; Gus Franklin on trombone, horns, guitar, backing vocals and drums; Isobel Knowles on trumpet, horns, vocals; Jamie Mildren on instrumentation, guitar, bass guitar, keyboards, flute, glockenspiel, and melodica; Sam Perry on slide guitar, vocals, bass guitar, drums, keyboards; Tara Shackell on instrumentation, tuba, trombone, keyboards; and Kellie Sutherland on clarinet, melodica, horns, vocals, keyboards.

It featured guest appearances by local musicians and was produced by The Carbohydrates (Cecil and Bird's production duo) in Cecil's Super Melody World studio, which was set up in a large garage space in Melbourne's inner northern suburbs. It was mixed by Tony Espie (The Avalanches, New Buffalo, Robert Palmer), at 001 Studios in Melbourne. Cyclic Defrost's Vaughan Healey described a typical gig as "a bewildering ride through dynamic tempo changes, finger clicks and swapped instruments. You never really know who is going to sing or what will happen next, and somehow the eight-piece juggles this anarchic structure with a music class worth of instruments and staging rearrangements."

== Reception ==
Professional ratings
Aggregate scores
Source	Rating
Metacritic	72/100
Review scores
Source	Rating
AllMusic	4.5/5 stars
Entertainment Weekly	B+
The Independent	4/5 stars
Mojo	3/5 stars
NME	8/10
Pitchfork	8.8/10
PopMatters	9/10
Rolling Stone	3/5 stars
Spin	D
Uncut	3/5 stars

In Case We Die appeared on the ARIA Albums Chart Top 100. At the ARIA Music Awards of 2005, the album received three nominations: 'Best Independent Release', 'Best Cover Art' (by Bird) and 'Best Adult Contemporary Release'. The song "It'5!" (pronounced "it's five") received airplay on the national radio network Triple J and was listed No. 56 in their Hottest 100 for 2005.

The album received generally favourable reviews according to Metacritic website's rating of 72 out of 100 based on reviews by 26 professional critics. AllMusic's Heather Phares found the music was "much more assured" than their debut album, Fingers Crossed (2003), with "lots of parts and changes to them" but it "never feels ponderous" containing "vibrant, irresistible, Technicolor music". Tiny Mix Tapes writer S. Kobak was unsure "whether Architecture in Helsinki is for real or an ironic parody of the post-Arcade Fire indie rock scene" as "[the album] sounds like a cross between Off the Wall-era Michael Jackson without the soul, the Banana Splits, the Grease soundtrack and shitty disco records". Laurence Station at ShakingThrough.net noted the group "progresses dramatically in ambition and proficiency" and likened their style to a "Jackson Pollock drip painting, chaotic and bustling" with "swirling, colorful melodic kaleidoscope works. Rhythmic continuity is so over".

== Track listing ==
1. "Neverevereverdid" – 4:49
2. "It'5!" – 2:07
3. "Tiny Paintings" – 3:03
4. "Wishbone" – 2:26
5. "Maybe You Can Owe Me" – 4:03
6. "Do the Whirlwind" – 4:39
7. "In Case We Die (Parts 1–4)" – 3:33
8. "The Cemetery" – 2:02
9. "Frenchy, I'm Faking" – 2:52
10. "Need to Shout" – 4:10
11. "Rendezvous: Potrero Hill" – 1:52
12. "What's in Store?" – 4:29
13. "Bats and Rats and Murderers" – 1:25 (UK edition bonus track)

== Release history ==
The track "Maybe You Can Owe Me" was used in the 2007 film I Know Who Killed Me, starring Lindsay Lohan.

"Do the Whirlwind" has an animated music video in a bizarre video game format.

== Personnel ==
Architecture in Helsinki members

- Cameron Bird – lead vocals, guitars, percussion
- James Cecil – drums, backing vocals, guitars, keyboards
- Gus Franklin – trombone, horns, guitar, vocals, drums
- Isobel Knowles – trumpet, horns, vocals
- Jamie Mildren – instrumentation, guitar, bass guitar, keyboards, flute, glockenspiel, melodica
- Sam Perry – slide guitar, vocals, bass guitar, drums, keyboards
- Tara Shackell – instrumentation, tuba, trombone, keyboards
- Kellie Sutherland – clarinet, melodica, horns, vocals, keyboards
