= Caroline's Spine (album) =

Studio album by Caroline's Spine
- Released: 1993
- Genre: Alternative rock
- Label: ANZA Records
- Producer: Dan Calderone

Caroline's Spine chronology
Caroline's Spine (1993)	... So Good Afternoon (1994)

Caroline's Spine is the self-titled debut album of the American hard rock band Caroline's Spine. It was released in 1993 before the band was entirely formed. The lead singer/primary song writer Jimmy Newquist wrote all the songs and played most of the instruments for the recording. Many of the tracks on this album were later re-recorded with the full band for future Caroline's Spine albums.

== Track listing ==
1. "Why Don't We Get Along"
2. "Psycho (Surf)"
3. "Ouch"
4. "Artichoke (VII)"
5. "As I Am"
6. "Say it to You"
7. "I Will Be Alright"
8. "I Like Everything"
9. "Train Called Sleep"
10. "Monsoon"
11. "Last Goodbye"
12. "Will You Hold My Hand"
13. "Psycho (Radio)"

== Personnel ==
- Produced by Dan Calderone & Caroline's Spine
- All words and music by James P. Newquist
- Music published by Archaic Music (BMI)
- Engineered by Dan Calderone & Joe Statt
- Recorded and mixed at Anza Digital Studios, San Diego, CA
- Mastered by David Merullo, RJR Digital
- Layout & design by Rick Goldman, CDS Graphics
- Cover art by HPN II
