= Caroline's Spine =

American rock band

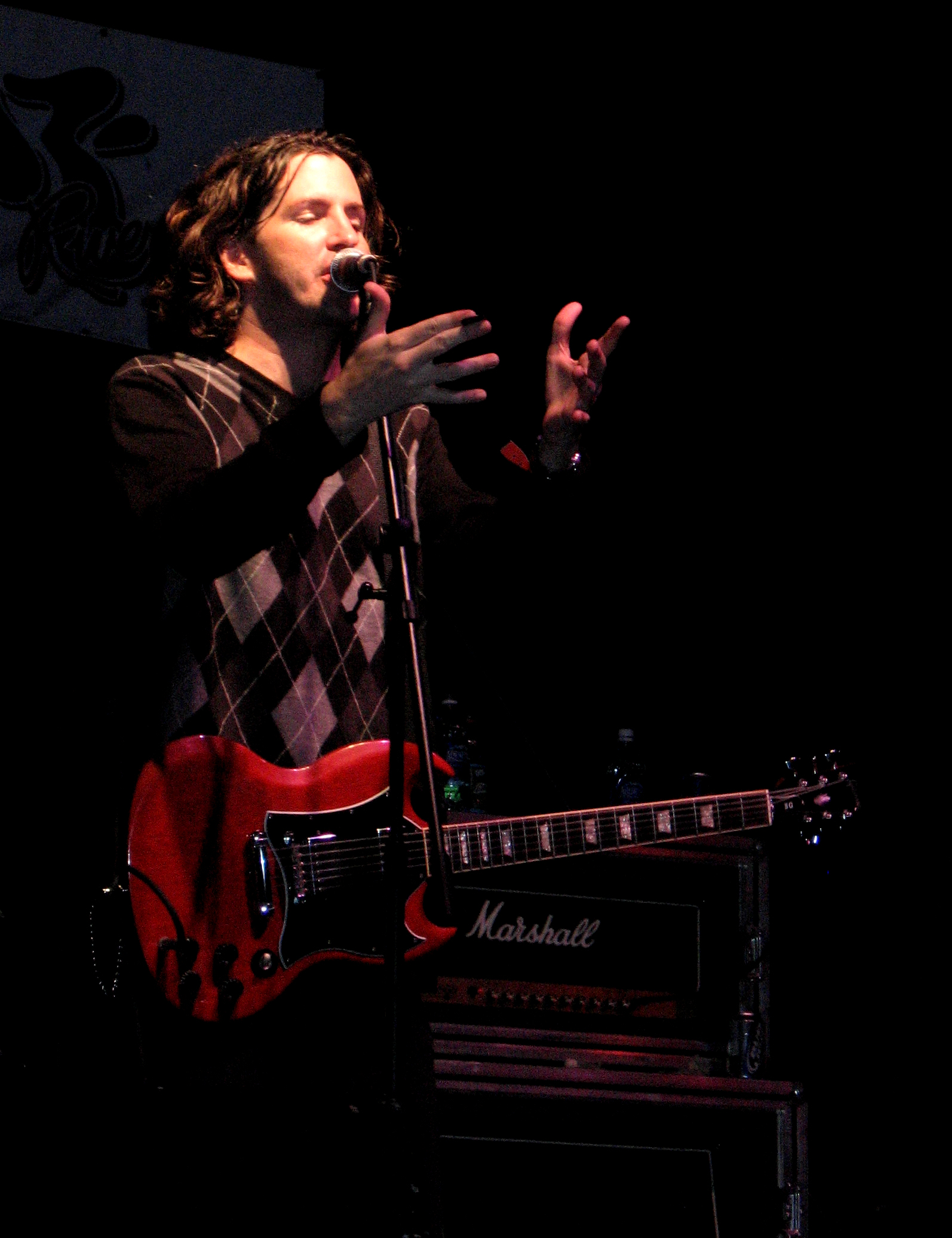
- Jimmy Newquist

Background information
- Origin: Phoenix, Arizona, U.S.
- Genres: Post-grunge, alternative rock, grunge (early)
- Years active: 1993–Present
- Labels: Anza Records, Hollywood Records
- Past members: Scott Jones; Mark Haugh; Luis Moral; Jason Gilardi

Caroline's Spine is an alternative rock band based in Phoenix, Arizona. The group's touring schedule in the mid-1990s landed them a record deal with Hollywood Records. They have released several studio albums and shared billings with such bands as Aerosmith, Kiss, and Queensrÿche. Songs by the group include "Sullivan," "Wallflower", "Attention Please", "Nothing To Prove" and "The Light Inside".

== History ==
=== ANZA Records ===
Caroline's Spine was created by lead singer/primary songwriter Jimmy Newquist. Under the direction of producer Dan Calderone and ANZA Records, Newquist performed virtually all of the instruments recorded for the Caroline's Spine self-titled debut album in 1993.

Jimmy along with his college friend, Mark Haugh, won the 'Best Unsigned Band' in the 1994 Yamaha sponsored 'Soundcheck' contest. To make ends meet, they sold all their furniture and went on the road with Jason Gilardi (from Los Angeles) on drums and Luis Moral on bass. They went on to release three more albums with ANZA Records before signing with Hollywood Records. Since 2007 Jimmy has continued the band including a new CD released in 2008.

=== Hollywood Records ===
Backed by Hollywood Records the band released two national albums (Monsoon and Attention Please) and made appearances on two motion picture soundtracks (An American Werewolf In Paris and Varsity Blues). They also toured around the world, opening for such acts Kiss and Aerosmith. Even without national promotion or television exposure, Caroline's Spine continued to make a name for themselves around the country. Word of mouth and extensive, nightly performances helped keep the band on the road for most of 1998 to 2000.

=== After Hollywood ===
Eventually Caroline's Spine decided to part ways with Hollywood Records in 2000. The band quickly released Like it or Not later that year. The disc was a compilation of old songs from the ANZA Records releases as well as four new songs. This was helpful to the fans that could not afford the scarce, early albums which had become highly valuable through secondary markets such as eBay. 2002 was a very busy year for the band. First, Live (Industrial Sampler) was released which included live performances from their Attention Please world tour. Later that year, The Grovers 10th Anniversary Edition was released to commemorate a decade passing since Jimmy and Mark were in the college band together. The album featured early versions of four songs ("Psycho," "She's Coming Home," "Why Don't We Get Along," and "I Will Be Alright") that would eventually appear on Caroline's Spine records. Finally, the band's eighth album, Overlooked, was also released in late 2002. It packaged remixes of the four new tracks from Like it or Not with two songs previously unreleased in America and six new songs.

The next five years saw a handful of live concerts before the group went on an unofficial hiatus. The band members took time to concentrate on family as well as other music projects. Jimmy Newquist released his first solo record, Ashley Ave, in 2003. Later that year, Jason Gilardi and Scott Jones released a self-titled album from their side project, New Science. The following year, Newquist recorded acoustic versions of eight Caroline's Spine fan favorites and released them as a new disc entitled On Tour. The third solo release from Newquist entitled Bump was released in 2005.

Taking advantage of online sales opportunities, the band released The Collection in 2006. This consisted of many live soundboard recordings from over the years as well as various demo recordings. A sort of greatest hits album was also released as The Collection Retail CD. More live concerts and demos are set to be released in the near future according to Newquist.

2007 saw the return of all four members with the release of their ninth album, Captured. The album featured new songs with reworked versions of old song ideas from over the years. A short tour followed to promote the release. Almost all the shows were considered sold out as the fans returned after the five-year hiatus. The official departure of band members Jason Gilardi, Scott Jones, and Mark Haugh was announced on the band's MySpace on June 29, 2007, due to "situations beyond our control." A tenth studio album, Work it Out was released in 2008. This includes the single "The Light Inside" which would go on to rank as the second most downloaded Caroline's Spine song, just under "Sullivan."

== Current status ==
On February 15, 2009, Jimmy Newquist flew back to the United States to perform live concerts again. The musicians reunited and performed a gig in Madison, Wisconsin. They have played live shows sparingly in the ensuing years, with gigs in Wisconsin in 2020 and 2023. Periodically, Jimmy Newquist performs private events and video concerts via video chat.

== Members ==
Current

- Jimmy Newquist – vocals, guitar, drums, primary songwriter
- Matt McHan – guitar
- Luke Sears – guitar
- Wes Weeber – percussion
- Matt Mabe – percussion
- Nate Teager – bass
- McKenna Madget – bass

Former members

- Mark Haugh – Guitar (1993–2007)
- Jason Gilardi – Drums (1994–2007)
- Scott Jones – Bass, Backing Vocals (1995–2007)
- Luis Moral – Bass (1994–1995)
- Jeff Rambo – Bass (2006–2009)

== Discography ==
=== Studio albums ===
- The Grovers (1992)
- Caroline's Spine (1993)
- ... So Good Afternoon (1994)
- Ignore the Ants (1995)
- Huge (1996)
- Monsoon (1997)
- Attention Please (1999)
- Overlooked (2002)
- Captured (2007)
- Work It Out (2008)
- Stranger Angel (2020)

=== Compilation albums ===
- Like It or Not (2000)

=== Greatest hits albums ===
- The Collection (2006)

=== Live albums ===
- Live (Industry Sampler) (2000)

=== Singles ===
- "Do U Remember When" (2011)
- "Eskimo Butterfly" (2013)
- "What Child is This" (2013)

=== Other projects ===
Jimmy Newquist

- Ashley Ave (2003)
- On Tour (2004)
- Bump (2005)
