= Now + 4eva =

Studio album by Architecture in Helsinki
- Released: 28 March 2014
- Genre: Indie pop
- Length: 36:36
- Label: Casual Workout
- Producers: Architecture in Helsinki, François Tétaz

Architecture in Helsinki chronology
Moment Bends (2011)	Now + 4eva (2014)

Singles from Now + 4eva
- 1. "In the Future" Released: 30 June 2013; 2. "Dream a Little Crazy" Released: 19 November 2013; 3. "I Might Survive" Released: 21 February 2014

Now + 4eva is the fifth and final studio album by Australian indie pop band Architecture in Helsinki, released in Australia on 28 March 2014.

== Production ==
Now + 4eva was co-produced by François Tétaz in collaboration with the band.

== Release ==
Two singles, "In the Future" and "Dream a Little Crazy", were released ahead of the album in 2013. Third single "I Might Survive", which Stereogum called "a smooth, percussive, horn-laden disco track", was released on 21 February 2014. A music video for "Dream a Little Crazy" was released on 28 January and depicts what Noisey described as a "biological bakery".

The album was released in Australia on 28 March 2014 through the band's own imprint Casual Workout via Inertia. Frontman Cameron Bird stated in March 2014 that the album had been finished for "almost a year".

The group embarked on a tour of the east coast of Australia in support of the album. Online pre-orders of the album from retailer JB Hi-Fi included a signed, printed "zine" detailing the band's inspirations.

Now + 4eva also includes a cover of the song "When You Walk in the Room", originally written and sung by Jackie DeShannon, but more famously covered by English band The Searchers.

== Reception ==
The album received generally mixed, if slightly negative reviews.

Professional ratings
Aggregate scores
Source	Rating
Metacritic	42/100
Review scores
Source	Rating
AllMusic	2/5 stars
Consequence of Sound	C−
Paste	4.0/10
Pitchfork	5.2/10
PopMatters	4/10
Under the Radar	3/10

== Track listing ==
All tracks are written by Architecture in Helsinki, except "When You Walk in the Room", written by Jackie DeShannon.

No.	Title	Length
1.	"In the Future"	3:00
2.	"When You Walk in the Room"	2:55
3.	"I Might Survive"	4:06
4.	"Dream a Little Crazy"	3:04
5.	"Boom (4eva)"	3:21
6.	"U Tell Me"	3:09
7.	"Echo"	3:07
8.	"Born to Convince You"	3:50
9.	"2 Time"	3:44
10.	"April"	3:29
11.	"Before Tomorrow"	2:51

== Personnel ==
- Brendyn Adams – mixing assistant
- Architecture in Helsinki – production
- Zoe Barry – cello
- Daniel Beasy – trumpet
- Cameron Bird – art direction, composition
- Margaret Bird – tributee
- Tristan Ceddia – design, typography
- Biddy Connor – viola
- Jackie DeShannon – composition
- Gus Franklin – composition, engineering
- Tim Harvey – background vocals
- Joe LaPorta – mastering
- Steve Majstorovic – baritone saxophone
- Haima Marriott – additional production, bass, composition, engineering
- Jamie Mildren – composition
- Evelyn Morris – background vocals
- Jordan Murray – trombone
- Santtu Mustonen – cover art
- Steph O'Hara – violin
- Sam Perry – composition
- Bec Rigby – background vocals
- Kellie Sutherland – composition
- Damian Taylor – mixing
- Francois Tetaz – composition, engineering, mixing, production
- Michelle Tran – photography

Credits adapted from AllMusic.

== Charts ==
Chart (2014)	Peak position
Australian Albums (ARIA)	25
