= Monsoon (disambiguation) =

A monsoon is a seasonal prevailing wind which lasts for several months.

Monsoon may also refer to:

== Business ==
- Monsoon (speakers), a brand of loudspeakers
- Monsoon Accessorize, a British clothing retailer
- Monsoon Books, a publishing firm

== Fictional characters ==
- Monsoon (comics), a mutant in the Marvel Comics universe
- Edina Monsoon, from the British television series Absolutely Fabulous
- Saffron Monsoon, from the British television series Absolutely Fabulous
- Monsoon, an antagonist from Metal Gear Rising: Revengeance

== Film ==
- Monsoon (1943 film), a reissue title for Isle of Forgotten Sins
- Monsoon (1952 film), an American film
- Monsoon (2014 film), a Canadian documentary about the monsoon season in India
- Monsoon (2015 film), an Indian film
- Monsoon (2019 film), a British film

== Music ==
- Monsoon (band), a 1980s UK world/pop trio
- Monsoon (Little River Band album), 1988
- Monsoon (Caroline's Spine album)
- Monsoon (Preston School of Industry album)
- "Monsoon", a song by ...And You Will Know Us by the Trail of Dead from their 2002 album Source Tags & Codes
- "Monsoon", a song by Enon from their 2003 album Hocus Pocus
- "Monsoon", a song by Jack Johnson from his 2008 album Sleep Through the Static
- "Monsoon", a song by Robbie Williams from his 2002 album Escapology
- "Monsoon", the English-language version of the German hit song "Durch den Monsun" by Tokio Hotel from their 2007 album Scream

== People ==
- Gorilla Monsoon (1937–1999), American professional wrestler
- Jinkx Monsoon, drag queen and winner of RuPaul's Drag Race season 5

== Other uses ==
- Monsoon (novel), by Wilbur Smith
- Apollo Monsoon, a Hungarian ultralight trike aircraft
- Monsoon Group, a German U-boat force during World War II
- Monsoon (photographs), a series of photographs taken by Brian Brake in India in 1960
- Mil Mi-35 (Monsoon), a Russian attack helicopter
- Monsoon, a combat robot in BattleBots season 8 and season 9
