= ...So Good Afternoon =

... So Good Afternoon

Studio album by Caroline's Spine
- Released: 1994
- Genre: Alternative rock
- Label: ANZA Records
- Producer: Dan Calderone

Caroline's Spine chronology
Caroline's Spine (1993)	... So Good Afternoon (1994)	Ignore the Ants (1995)

... So Good Afternoon is the second studio album by American alternative rock band Caroline's Spine. The relatively short album features many tracks which would be later re-recorded for other albums. It was intended primarily as a compilation to sell at their live shows.

== Track listing ==
No.	Title	Length
1.	"King For a Day"	3:17
2.	"Wallflower"	5:03
3.	"Jumpship"	3:13
4.	"Unglued"	2:57
5.	"Palm O' Mine"	4:17
6.	"Good Afternoon"	9:44
7.	"Surprise" (hidden track)

== Personnel ==
- Jimmy Newquist – vocals, bass, guitar
- Jason Gilardi – drums, percussion
- Mark Haugh – guitar
- Luis Moral – bass (Listed, but did not record. He joined briefly after the recording.)

Production

- Produced by Dan Calderone and Caroline's Spine
- All music and lyrics by James P. Newqust
- Music published by Archaic Music (BMI)
- Recorded & mixed at Anza Digital, San Diego, CA in July 1994.
- Engineered by Dan Calderone & Joe Statt
- Layout & design by Joe Statt
- Photography by Jim Newquist, Elizabeth Capps, Jeff Taylor, Mark Haugh & Lori Statt
