= Overlooked (album) =

Compilation album by Caroline's Spine
- Released: 2002
- Genre: Alternative rock
- Label: Independent
- Producer: Jimmy Newquist

Caroline's Spine chronology
Like It or Not (2000)	Overlooked (2002)	The Grovers (2003)

Overlooked is an album by American alternative rock band Caroline's Spine. It includes new songs along with some songs that were rerecorded and slightly updated in style, tone, and quality.

== Track listing ==
1. "End Up" – 3:32
2. "July" – 2:38
3. "Overlooked" – 3:43
4. "Drift Away" – 3:16
5. "Soldier Song" – 3:14
6. "Angels" – 4:14
7. "Know Me at All" – 3:33
8. "Never Left" – 3:12
9. "Please Let Me Go" – 3:20
10. "Like it or Not" – 2:49
11. "Dirty Work" – 3:34
12. "Quarter Century New" – 2:51

== Band Lineup ==
- Jimmy Newquist - vocals, guitar, bass
- Mark Haugh - guitar, backing vocals
- Jason Gilardi - drums and percussion
- Scott Jones - bass, backing vocals
