= Mausam (soundtrack) =

Soundtrack album by Pritam Chakraborty
- Released: 15 August 2011
- Recorded: 2010–2011
- Genre: Feature film soundtrack
- Length: 1:02:38
- Language: Hindi
- Label: T-Series
- Producer: Pritam Chakraborty

Pritam Chakraborty chronology
Always Kabhi Kabhi (2011)	Mausam (2011)	Tell Me O Kkhuda (2011)

Mausam is the soundtrack album to the 2011 film of the same name directed by Pankaj Kapur, starring Shahid Kapoor and Sonam Kapoor. The soundtrack to the film featured thirteen songs composed by Pritam Chakraborty with lyrics written by Irshad Kamil. It was released under the T-Series label on 15 August 2011 to positive critical reviews.

== Development ==
Pritam composed the music for Mausam; he previously scored a Shahid Kapoor film for the third time, after Jab We Met (2007) and Kismat Konnection (2008). He also signed another film which starred Shahid, titled Heer Aur Ranjha which began production in late-2010, but the film was shelved due to budget constraints. Pritam started working on the film's music in May 2010, where he started recording a raga-based love melody with vocals intended to be recorded by classical musician Rashid Khan. Initially, Pritam conceived the tune as a small music piece, but after Pankaj heard the tune, he wanted it to be developed as a full-fledged song, which eventually became "Poore Se Zara Sa Kam Hai".

When the tune was developed, Pritam recorded the song in late July 2011 at midnight amidst a live concert tour in Kolkata. After the performance, he went to his studio in Kalighat where he had brought Rashid Khan for the vocals. Pritam collaborated with Rashid for the first time and "he turned out to be a chilled out man". Rashid had rendered a portion to Pankaj at his studio in Mumbai, but the recording happened in Kolkata on 20 July 2011. The song had the word 'mausam' being surfaced, which also serving as the title track. Although most of the tracks will be part of the background score, barring one item number, the song was picturized on Kapoor.

Initially, he had locked all the tunes for the film at the last quarter of 2010, but in that November, after his concert tour in Nigeria, Pritam was tasked to produce three songs immediately as the film's concurrent schedule in Punjab was preponed by a week. But he assured the team that he would compose the songs, after the team prioritizes the talkie portions and dialogues. Pritam was then briefed to compose love ballads in a Punjabi style which he considered it to be "tricky". In that period, he recorded one song "Sajh Dhaj Ke" with Mika Singh in early morning at Pritam's studio with Pankaj also being involved in the recording session. Pankaj also recorded supporting vocals for the song.

== Release ==
The soundtrack was released directly through stores on 15 August 2011 under the T-Series label. A success party for the film's music was held in Mumbai on 9 September, with the cast and crew in attendance.

Besides thirteen songs for the film, Pritam had composed two additional songs which were not released to the public: One being "Zara Si Mehndi", a romantic number sung by Sonu Nigam and Shreya Ghoshal, and the other being "Abhi Na Jao Chhod", an adaptation of the eponymous song from the film Hum Dono (1961). The song "Ajeeb Daastaan Hai Ye" from the film Dil Apna Aur Preet Parai (1960), was featured in a particular sequence.

== Reception ==
Joginder Tuteja from Bollywood Hungama gave it 4 out of 5 stars and said: "Mausam is a fantastic album and has all the ingredients that make for a popular soundtrack. There isn't really a low point in the album which may have a situational track or two but largely ensures that there is enough 'masala' in it to find acceptance amongst masses as well as classes." Rajiv Vijayakar of The Indian Express wrote "With this film, for the umpteenth time, Pritam once again defines the clear demarcation between those who compose songs and those who make extended jingles. In the absence of the levels of the stunning film soundtracks of last year, this is certainly, as of now, the most accomplished music score of the year." Karthik Srinivasan of Milliblog wrote "Mausam’s music engages sporadically."

Saibal Chatterjee of NDTV described the numbers "hummable". Critic based at The New Indian Express felt that "Pritam's music is apt" but the best tunes in the film being "Ajeeb Daastaan Hai Ye" and "Abhi Na Jao Chhod".

== Track listing ==
No.	Title	Singer(s)	Length
1.	"Aag Lage Uss Aag Ko"	Karsan Sargathia	3:13
2.	"Ik Tu Hi Tu Hi"	Hans Raj Hans, Ustad Sultan Khan	7:13
3.	"Mallo Malli" (Version 1)	Tochi Raina	3:42
4.	"Mallo Malli" (Version 2)	Lehmber Hussainpuri, Hard Kaur	3:43
5.	"Poore Se Zara Sa Kam Hai"	Rashid Khan	3:48
6.	"Rabba Main Toh Mar Gaya Oye" (Version 1)	Shahid Mallya	4:13
7.	"Rabba Main Toh Mar Gaya Oye" (Version 2)	Rahat Fateh Ali Khan	4:43
8.	"Sajh Dhaj Ke"	Mika Singh, Pankaj Kapur	4:54
9.	"Ik Tu Hi Tu Hi" (Mehfil Mix)	Wadali Brothers	5:53
10.	"Ik Tu Hi Tu Hi" (Reprise)	Shahid Mallya, Ustad Sultan Khan	6:21
11.	"Mallo Malli" (Remix)	Tochi Raina	4:49
12.	"Sajh Dhaj Ke" (Club Mix Tiger Style)	Mika Singh, Pankaj Kapoor	4:56
13.	"Sajh Dhaj Ke" (Desi Mix Tiger Style)	Mika Singh, Pankaj Kapoor	4:55
Total length:			1:02:38

== Accolades ==
Award	Category	Recipient(s)	Result	Ref.
Mirchi Music Awards	Male Vocalist of The Year	Hans Raj Hans – ("Ik Tu Hi Tu Hi")	Nominated	
Mirchi Music Awards	Upcoming Male Vocalist of The Year	Shahid Mallya – ("Rabba Main Toh Mar Gaya Oye")	Nominated	
Mirchi Music Awards	Song representing Sufi tradition	"Rabba Main Toh Mar Gaya Oye"	Nominated	
