= Moment Bends =

Studio album by Architecture in Helsinki
- Released: 8 April 2011
- Recorded: June 2008 – September 2010; Buckingham Palace (Melbourne, Australia)
- Genre: Indie pop
- Length: 40:21
- Label: Modular
- Producers: Architecture in Helsinki, François Tétaz, Haima Marriott

Architecture in Helsinki chronology
| Places Like This (2007) | Moment Bends (2011) | Now + 4eva (2014) |

Singles from Moment Bends
- 1. "That Beep" Released: 2008; 2. "Contact High" Released: January 2011; 3. "Escapee" Released: August 2011; 4. "W.O.W" Released: January 2012

Moment Bends is the fourth studio album by Australian indie pop band Architecture in Helsinki, released in Australia on 8 April 2011. The first single released from the album was "Contact High". It reached number 1 in the Australian Dance Albums Chart, and was voted number eight in triple j's 2011 Album Poll.

== Production ==
The project was given the working title Vision Revision, before the album was renamed Moment Bends.

The album was co-produced by François Tétaz and Haima Marriott. It was recorded in a rented studio in Melbourne, nicknamed "Buckingham Palace" after a photo mural of Fleetwood Mac's Lindsey Buckingham the band hung on the wall.

== Release ==
Moment Bends was released in Australia on 8 April 2011 and in the United States on 3 May 2011.

The first single released from the album was "Contact High", although "That Beep", which is included on the album, was released as an EP in 2008.

The third single, "Escapee", is on the soundtrack for the videogame FIFA 12.

== Reception ==
=== Critics ===
Professional ratings
Aggregate scores
| Source | Rating |
|---|---|
| Metacritic | 61/100 |
Review scores
| Source | Rating |
| AllMusic | 3.5/5 stars |
| Pitchfork Media | 6.5/10 |
| Slant Magazine | 2.5/5 stars |

Moment Bends received mixed to positive reviews from critics. At Metacritic, which assigns a weighted mean rating out of 100 to reviews from mainstream critics, the album received an average score of 61, based on 14 reviews, indicating "generally favorable reviews". Heather Phares of AllMusic labelled the album a "return to form" and more focused than its predecessor. Eric Grandy of Pitchfork Media gave the album a score of 6.5, noting its indebtedness to "lite-FM 80s", while praising "Contact High" as a "terrific pop song", though he felt the rest of the record was uneven.

Slant Magazine's Kevin Liedel expressed confusion with the album, asserting it was a "good bet that after only one track of Moment Bends, most longtime fans will have their brows furrowed." He added that "it's difficult to gauge whether or not the album is intentionally bad." Uncut magazine dismissed it as "the kind of glossily produced 'perfect pop' you can spin a dozen times without ever remembering a single tune."

=== Accolades ===
At the J Awards of 2011, the album was nominated for Australian Album of the Year.

In December 2011, it was announced that Moment Bends was voted number eight in triple j's 2011 Album Poll.

The album was reposted on Double J as a "Classic Album" in November 2021.

== Personnel ==
- Architecture in Helsinki – production
- Max Doyle – band portrait
- Haima Marriott – engineer, mastering, mixing, production
- Metz + Racine – cover image
- Greg Moore – mastering
- People Collective – cover design
- François Tétaz – co-production

== Track listing ==
All tracks are written by Architecture in Helsinki and Cameron Bird, except where noted.

| No. | Title | Length |
|---|---|---|
| 1. | "Desert Island" | 4:15 |
| 2. | "Escapee" | 2:59 |
| 3. | "Contact High" | 3:40 |
| 4. | "W.O.W" | 2:51 |
| 5. | "Yr Go To" | 4:21 |
| 6. | "Sleep Talkin'" | 2:58 |
| 7. | "I Know Deep Down" | 3:57 |
| 8. | "That Beep" | 3:45 |
| 9. | "Denial Style" | 3:24 |
| 10. | "Everything's Blue" | 3:55 |
| 11. | "B4 3D" (Architecture in Helsinki, Bird, Gus Franklin) | 4:16 |

iTunes Store bonus video
| No. | Title | Length |
|---|---|---|
| 12. | "Contact High" | 3:37 |

== Charts ==
=== Weekly charts ===
| Chart (2011) | Peak position |
|---|---|
| Australian Albums Chart | 12 |
| Australian Dance Albums Chart | 1 |

=== Year-end charts ===
| Chart (2011) | Position |
|---|---|
| Australian Dance Albums Chart | 28 |
