= Places Like This =

Studio album by Architecture in Helsinki
- Released: 28 July 2007
- Recorded: October 2006 – January 2007
- Genre: Indie pop
- Length: 31:30
- Label: Polyvinyl
- Producer: Architecture in Helsinki

Architecture in Helsinki chronology
We Died, They Remixed (2006)	Places Like This (2007)	Moment Bends (2011)

Places Like This is the third studio album by Architecture in Helsinki, which was released in Australia on 27 July 2007 at the launch of their Australian tour. It was also released in Japan on 18 July, Europe on 8 August, and in the United States on 21 August. It debuted at No. 31 on the ARIA Albums Chart, and dropped to No. 49 in its second week.

At the J Awards of 2007, the album was nominated for Australian Album of the Year.

== Background ==
Australian group, Architecture in Helsinki issued their third studio album, Places Like This on 28 July 2007 on Polyvinyl Record Co. In September of the previous year, Laura Pearson of Pitchfork Media reported that the group were working on tracks with Cameron Bird (lead singer) in Brooklyn, United States while the other members were in Melbourne. It was recorded at Dave Sitek's (from TV on the Radio) studio in Williamsburg, Brooklyn and in Sydney's Big Jesus Burger Studios between October 2006 and January 2007. It was engineered and mixed by Chris Coady, who has previously worked with TV on the Radio, Yeah Yeah Yeahs and Grizzly Bear. The first single from the album, "Heart It Races", was released ahead of the album in May and peaked into the top 50 on the ARIA Singles Chart. Places Like This reached the top 30 on the related albums chart. In the US, the album reached the top 10 on two of Billboard magazine's component charts: Top Electronic Albums and Heatseekers Albums in September.

== Reception ==
Professional ratings
Aggregate scores
Source	Rating
Metacritic	66/100
Review scores
Source	Rating
AllMusic	2.5/5 stars
Drowned in Sound	6/10
Entertainment Weekly	B−
The Guardian	4/5 stars
Pitchfork	6.4/10
Now	2/5
PopMatters	6/10
Rolling Stone	3/5 stars
The Skinny	3/5 stars
Slant Magazine	4/5 stars

According to review aggregator Metacritic, Places Like This has a score of 66 out of 100, indicating "generally favorable reviews".

== Track listing ==
1. "Red Turned White" – 2:46
2. "Heart It Races" – 3:14
3. "Hold Music" – 3:54
4. "Feather in a Baseball Cap" – 2:27
5. "Underwater" – 3:28
6. "Like It or Not" – 3:01
7. "Debbie" – 2:53
8. "Lazy (Lazy)" – 2:55
9. "Nothing's Wrong" – 3:22
10. "Same Old Innocence" – 3:30
