= Like It or Not (album) =

Compilation album by Caroline's Spine
- Released: 2000
- Genre: Alternative rock
- Label: Independent
- Producer: Ed Knoll and Caroline's Spine

Caroline's Spine chronology
Attention Please (1999)	Like It or Not (2000)	Overlooked (2002)

Professional ratings
Review scores
Source	Rating
Allmusic	link
Ink 19	(not rated)

Like It or Not is a compilation album by American alternative rock band Caroline's Spine. Having parting ways with Hollywood Records, the band returned to their independent origins with this album. Some of the tracks are live recordings and one, "Moby Stick," is a drum solo by Jason Gilardi. Most tracks are available on previous albums, and this recording was largely intended to provide fans who may not have had a chance to acquire older albums to purchase a compilation album.

== Track listing ==
All songs written by Jimmy Newquist.

1. "Like it or Not" – 2:48
2. "Drift Away" – 3:16
3. "Overlooked" – 3:45
4. "Know Me at All" – 3:36
5. "Palm O' Mine" – 4:15
6. "Much Better" – 2:53
7. "Million Years" – 4:54
8. "Ouch" – 3:54
9. "Trippin' Laces" – 4:22
10. "Moby Stick" – 1:33
11. "Jumpship" – 3:50
12. "As I am" – 5:07
13. "Hold My Hand" – 4:38
14. "My World" – 3:10
15. "Forget" – 3:37
16. "Think About Me" – 3:48
17. "She's Coming Home" – 4:06
18. "On the Ground" – 2:23
19. "61" – 5:05
20. "Surprise" – 1:59

== Band Lineup ==
- Jimmy Newquist - vocals, guitar, bass
- Mark Haugh - guitar, backing vocals
- Jason Gilardi - drums and percussion
- Scott Jones - bass, backing vocals
