= François Tétaz =

Australian film composer and music producer (b. 1971)

- Tétaz in 2009

Background information
- Born: 1971 (age 54–55); Melbourne, Victoria, Australia
- Genres: pop, experimental, classical, world music, industrial, electronic, rock
- Instruments: Percussion, Violin
- Years active: 1992–present
- Labels: Sony/ATV, Rubber

François "Franç" Tétaz (born 1971) is an Australian film composer, music producer, and mixer. Early in his career, he was a member of the band Shinjuku Thief.

As a producer he has worked with Gotye, Kimbra, Architecture in Helsinki, Lior, and Bertie Blackman. He won an ARIA for his work on Gotye's Making Mirrors album in 2011, and also won the Grammy Award for Record of the Year for "Somebody That I Used to Know" (Gotye, featuring Kimbra) in 2013.

== Early life and education ==
François Tétaz was born in Australia in 1971, a second-generation Australian of French Swiss descent.

He attended Geelong Grammar School, graduating in 1988. After finishing school, he did not study music formally at university, but chose his own teachers, including Graeme Leak, who was artist in residence at the Sydney Conservatorium of Music at the time. He initially focused on violin and percussion.

== Career ==
In 1992, François Tétaz, along with Charles Tétaz and Darrin Verhagen, formed Shinjuku Thief, a Melbourne-based industrial and experimental music group. They released four albums by 1995, and Verhagen continued to use the moniker for his further projects.

Tétaz released a solo album in 1997. In his early twenties, Tétaz scored student short films, and tried his hand at writing songs. After writing and producing music for some years, he moved on to mastering in his mid-twenties. In 1998 he set up his own studio in an old chocolate factory in the inner-Melbourne suburb of Richmond, which became Moose Mastering, where he was able to "do all the different things I wanted to do with my own music, and also mix and master other people's projects".

In 2003 he composed and was sound designer on a dance work by Chunky Move with Lucy Guerin, Michael Kantor, and Gideon Obarzanek called Tense Dave, which won the 2005 Bessie Award for Outstanding Choreography/Creation. He has also composed other works for Chunky Move and Guerin. In 2004, he composed the score for the film Thunderstruck.

Tétaz has written and/or produced music for several installations by Australian multi-media artist Patricia Piccinini, including her work titled We Are Family, exhibited at the 2003 Venice Biennale. He also wrote soundscapes for her 2009 installation Perhaps the World is Fine Tonight and her diorama The peace between lightning and thunder, which was installed at QAGOMA in Brisbane in 2018.

He composed the score for the 2005 horror film Wolf Creek, which won the Australasian Performing Right Association (APRA) / Australian Guild of Screen Composers (AGSC) 2006 Feature Film Score of the Year Award. He did some mixing on American rapper Kool Keith's 2006 album The Return of Dr. Octagon.

In his music making, Tétaz has been influenced by the work of two neuroscientists, Daniel Levitin (This Is Your Brain On Music, 2006) and David Huron (Sweet Anticipation: Music And The Psychology Of Expectation, 2006). He has worked extensively with his friend audio mastering engineer Lachlan Carrick, who works as a producer with electronica outfit Velure. In 2007 Tétaz and Carrick remastered The Triffids' 2007 album Calenture.

Tétaz has collaborated extensively with Lior. He produced and co-wrote Lior's 2008 studio album Corner of an Endless Road, arranging Lior's songs for various instruments and voices. He collaborated on the Lior song "Safety of Distance", which was performed at the ANZAC Centenary dawn service at Gallipoli.

He scored Nash Edgerton's debut feature The Square (2008), which also incorporates songs by Ben Lee. He scored Luke Doolan's short film Miracle Fish (2009), and in 2012 scored the music for Underground: The Julian Assange Story, which was nominated for Best Music for a Mini-Series or Telemovie in the APRA Music Awards of 2013.

Wally De Backer (Gotye) and Tétaz worked together on the Gotye albums Like Drawing Blood (2006) and Making Mirrors (2011). It was Tétaz who suggested Kimbra for the song Somebody That I Used to Know, which was produced by De Backer and engineered and mixed by De Backer and Tétaz. Tétaz won the Grammy Award for Record of the Year at the 55th annual Grammy Awards for the song, and it was voted number one in the triple j Hottest 100 for 2011. Also in 2011, he produced Moment Bends for Architecture in Helsinki, which was released in April 2011. The album was reposted on Double J as a "Classic Album" in November 2021. Tétaz wrote, produced, or mixed a total of seven songs in the triple j Hottest 100 for 2011 (announced 26 January 2012), including the number one that year, "Somebody That I Used to Know".

In 2009 he collaborated with Bertie Blackman on her third album, Secrets and Lies, and in 2012 co-wrote and produced Bertie Blackman's her fourth studio album, Pope Innocent X.

In August 2012, he moved to Los Angeles and started working in a studio there, which included work with Australian artists who came over to work with him. In 2013, he worked with Spiderbait on a new album, which was recorded in Australia. In 2013-14 he co-produced Architecture in Helsinki's final studio album, Now + 4eva. Also in 2013 and 2014, Tetaz collaborated with American musician Lo-Fang on his album Blue Film. Later in 2014, he co-produced the track in which Lo-Fang provides the vocals, for a "mini film" advertisement for Chanel No. 5 by Baz Luhrmann. Lo-Fang sings a cover rendition of "You're the One that I Want", the classic from the 1978 film Grease.

Tétaz wrote the score for the 2024 film The Surfer, starring Nicolas Cage, which was ARIA-nominated. The US music and entertainment magazine Paste compared it to a score by the famous Italian composer Ennio Morricone, calling it a "terrific score [that] carries strains of Morricone in its mythic propulsion".

Working with Lachlan Carrick, Tetaz produced some of the tracks for the soundtrack of Baz Luhrmann's 2022 Elvis, for which he was nominated for a Grammy as music producer. Among others, he worked on "Power of My Love", a duet with Jack White and Elvis Presley. Carrick and Tétaz are credited as mastering engineers on "Vegas" by Doja Cat, which samples the song "Hound Dog".

Tétaz created the score for the 2026 Netflix TV series of My Brilliant Career. On the same day as the release of the series, 13 August 2026, two soundtracks were released; one of these was the 31-track soundtrack credited to Tétaz, with many of the tracks featuring Molly Lewis. Tétaz created the score, which was recorded at SynthTemple in Melbourne, featuring Lewis whistling and Kate Miller-Heidke on vocals, along with musicians Luke Carbon and Melina van Leeuwen playing a large number of instruments between them.

Also in 2026, he co-produced, with Luke Howard, the EP Way of the World by the Australian singer Tina Arena, also recorded at SynthTemple. The record includes covers of songs by artists such as New Order, Max Q, Depeche Mode, Duran Duran, and Frank Ocean, using orchestral arrangements, prepared piano, analogue synthesisers, and digital layers.

== Other activities ==
Tétaz has been a member of APRA AMCOS since 1992, and as of 2025 is an ambassador for the organisation.

On 30 September 2025, he appeared by videolink before the Australian Parliament's Environment and Communications References Committee on National Cultural Policy, along with Adam Briggs, Paul Dempsey, Holly Rankin (aka Jack River), and Daniel McNamee. The Committee comprised Senators Varun Ghosh, Sarah Henderson, and David Pocock. The musicians urged the government to respect the intellectual property of musicians and other creatives and protect it against theft by AI by strengthening the Copyright Act 1968. Tetaz had previously had a meeting with (Arts Minister) Tony Burke about the topic of the theft of intellectual property.

== Recognition and awards ==
The soundtrack for Thunderstruck, which Tétaz composed with David Thrussell, was nominated for the AFI Award for Best Original Music Score in the 2004 Australian Film Institute Awards.

Tétaz was nominated for the AFI Award for Best Original Music Score in the 2005 AFI Awards for the Wolf Creek soundtrack, and, along with Ben Lee, was nominated in the same category for The Square in the 2008 AFI Awards.

In the APRA Music Awards of 2009, Lior and Tétaz were nominated for the Blues & Roots Work of the Year award, for "Heal Me".

In the 55th Annual Grammy Awards in 2013, "Somebody That I Used to Know" won Record Of The Year, with credits to Wally De Backer (Gotye) as producer; De Backer & Tétaz as engineers/mixers, and William Bowden, mastering engineer. The song also won the Grammy Award for Best Pop Duo/Group Performance as performed by Gotye and Kimbra. Making Mirrors took home the Grammy Award for Best Alternative Music Album, with Gotye credited as producer and Tetaz as engineer/mixer.

The soundtrack of Underground: The Julian Assange Story was nominated for Best Music for a Mini-Series or Telemovie in the APRA Music Awards of 2013.

Tétaz was a guest presenter at the 2019 APRA Music Awards, along with Tina Arena, Briggs, Tim Rogers, Megan Washington, G Flip, and others.

Tetaz' score for the 2019 film Judy and Punch won the AACTA Award for Best Original Music Score as well as Best Soundtrack Album in the APRA Music Awards of 2020.

=== ARIA Music Awards ===
The ARIA Music Awards is an annual awards ceremony that recognises excellence, innovation, and achievement across all genres of Australian music.

Year	Nominee / work	Award	Result	Ref.
2006	Wolf Creek (soundtrack)	Best Original Soundtrack, Cast or Show Album	Nominated	
2011	François Tétaz for "Somebody That I Used to Know", by Gotye featuring Kimbra	Engineer of the Year	Won	
2012	François Tétaz for "Making Mirrors", by Gotye	Engineer of the Year	Won	
2025	The Surfer (Original Motion Picture Soundtrack)	Best Original Soundtrack or Musical Theatre Cast Album	Nominated	
2026	My Brilliant Career	Best Original Soundtrack, Cast or Show Album	Won	

== Personal life ==
Tétaz has three daughters.

In August 2012, he moved to Los Angeles and started working in a studio there. As of 2025 he lives in Melbourne.

== Discography ==
=== Albums ===
List of albums, with selected details
Title	Details
The Motionless World of Time Between	Released: 1997; Format: CD; Label: Dorobo (DOROBO 014)
Beautiful Cyborg (with Philip Brophy & Darrin Verhagen)	Released: 2002; Format: CD; Label: Sound Punch Records (HURT-04)
Under the Radar (Original Motion Picture Score) (with David Thrussell)	Released: 2004; Format: CD; Label: Mana Music (CD20020)
Thunderstruck (Original Motion Picture Soundtrack)	Released: 2004; Format: promo CD (four tracks also on various artists commercial CD); Label: Shock (20019)
Wolf Creek (Original Motion Picture Soundtrack)	Released: 2005; Format: CD and MP3; Label: Rubber Records (RUB214)
Rogue (Original Motion Picture Soundtrack)	Released: 2007; Format: CD and MP3; Label: Rubber Records (RUB238)
Judy and Punch (Original Motion Picture Soundtrack)	Released: 2020; Format: LP and MP3; Label: Rubber Records (RUB3--)
The Surfer (Original Motion Picture Soundtrack)	Released: May 2025; Label: Rubber Records
