= Architecture in Helsinki =

Australian indie pop band

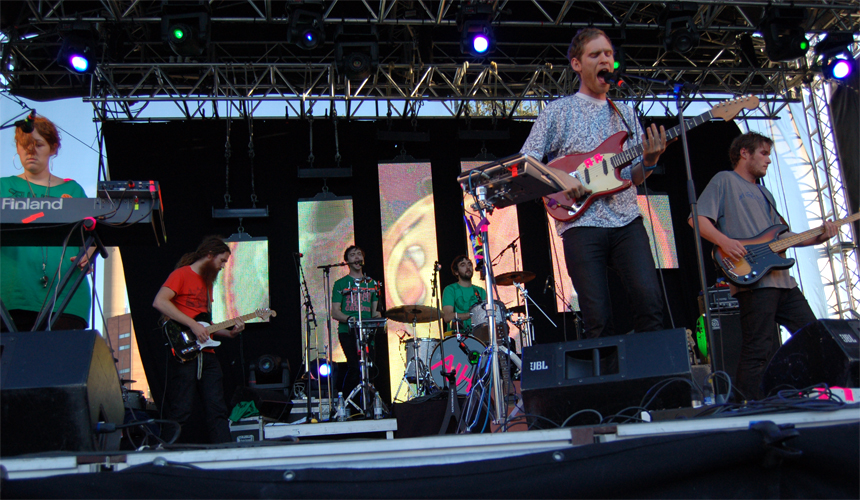
- Architecture in Helsinki performing in Helsinki, August 2007; L–R: Kellie Sutherland, Jamie Mildren, Gus Franklin, James Cecil, Cameron Bird and Sam Perry.

Background information
- Origin: Fitzroy, Victoria, Australia
- Genre: Indie pop
- Years active: 2000–2018
- Labels: Trifekta, Bar/None, Tailem Bend, Moshi Moshi, Polyvinyl, Scotland Yard, Co-Operative, Modular, Downtown
- Past members: Cameron Bird; Gus Franklin; Sam Perry; Kellie Sutherland; Jamie Mildren; Ben Donnan; James Cecil; Isobel Knowles; Tara Shackell

Architecture in Helsinki were an Australian indie pop band which consisted of Cameron Bird, Gus Franklin, Jamie Mildren, Sam Perry, and Kellie Sutherland. Before its hiatus, the band released five studio albums: Fingers Crossed (2003), In Case We Die (2005), Places Like This (2007), Moment Bends (2011), and Now + 4eva (2014). The band has been inactive since 2018.

== History ==
=== 2000–2003: Formation and Fingers Crossed ===
Architecture in Helsinki developed from a short-lived high school music experiment in the New South Wales city of Albury, by childhood friends Cameron Bird (lead singer), Jamie Mildren and Sam Perry. By 1999, the trio had moved to the Melbourne suburb of Fitzroy, where they used the name Architecture in Helsinki for Bird's first collection of self-penned songs. Bird got the new band's name after cutting up a newspaper and re-arranging words. They played a small number of gigs before going into recess.

In 2000, while studying photography at art school, Bird met James Cecil, and the two developed a musical connection. Within months, Cecil joined the band on drums. Around that time, Bird took up guitar. He also met Kellie Sutherland at a party and invited her to play clarinet for the band.

The five-member group began to work on their debut album, Fingers Crossed, at Super Melody World, the recording studio Cecil had built in a church hall in a south-eastern Melbourne suburb. Recording was halted when Bird left for an extended holiday in the US, leaving the album unfinished. Upon his return from Portland, Oregon, Bird was inspired to write short, catchy pop songs, which marked a new direction for the band.

At art school, Bird met members of The Rhinestone Horns, a brass ensemble, and recruited Isobel Knowles, Tara Shackell and Gus Franklin – all three originally from Victoria's Western District – to complete Architecture in Helsinki's eight-member line-up. In 2002, the group signed with independent record label, Trifekta, which released their debut single, "Like a Call", in December.

Nearly two years after starting work, Fingers Crossed was issued on 9 February 2003. Most of the group's members played a number of instruments and their music made use of a wide range, from analog synthesizers, samplers, the glockenspiel and handclaps to concert band instruments such as the trumpet, tuba, trombone, saxophone, clarinet and recorder, as well as the more standard guitars, bass guitar and drums.

=== 2003–2005: In Case We Die ===
In 2003, Architecture in Helsinki toured Australia supporting The Go-Betweens, then undertook their own east coast tour, followed by a support tour for international acts, Yo La Tengo, múm and Arab Strap. The group issued the Kindling EP in October, which included collaborations with the electronica artist Qua, the electronic duoB(if)tek, and braindance artist Bogdan Raczynski. As a bonus on the disc, Knowles provided an animated video for "Like a Call". In December, they appeared at the Meredith Music Festival. From February 2004, the group toured Japan, Europe and US. In April, Fingers Crossed was released in North America by Bar/None Records.

In 2005, the group released their second album, In Case We Die, on their own "Tailem Bend" label. It featured guest appearances by local musicians and was produced by The Carbohydrates, James Cecil and Cameron Bird's production duo, in Cecil's Super Melody World studio, then set up in a large garage space in Melbourne's inner northern suburbs. It was mixed by Tony Espie (The Avalanches, New Buffalo, Robert Palmer), at 001 Studios in Melbourne. Cyclic Defrost's Vaughan Healey described a typical gig as "a bewildering ride through dynamic tempo changes, finger clicks and swapped instruments. You never really know who is going to sing or what will happen next, and somehow the eight-piece juggles this anarchic structure with a music class worth of instruments and staging rearrangements."

For the ARIA Music Awards of 2005, the album received three nominations: "Best Independent Release", "Best Cover Art" (by Bird) and "Best Adult Contemporary Release". The song "It'5!" (pronounced "it's five") received wide airplay on the national radio network Triple J and reached No. 56 in the annual Triple J Hottest 100 for 2005.

=== 2006-2008: Line-up changes, We Died, They Remixed and Places Like This ===
In mid-2006, Architecture in Helsinki announced via their MySpace page that Knowles and Shackell were no longer members and cited "creative conflicts" with Bird as the reason for their departure. Knowles continued with her work in animation and music. In September 2007, Franklin, Knowles, Shackell and Sutherland provided the brass section on the Kevin Ayers album The Unfairground. Shackell returned to tertiary studies and is a ceramicist.

On 28 October 2006, as a six-member group, Architecture in Helsinki released We Died, They Remixed, a remix album consisting of all tracks from In Case We Die, and the song "Like a Call" from Fingers Crossed. Artists who provided remixes included Hot Chip, New Buffalo, Safety Scissors, DAT politics, Mocky and Isan.

Architecture in Helsinki released their next album, Places Like This on 28 July 2007 on Polyvinyl Record Co. In September 2006, Pitchfork reported that they were working on tracks with Bird in Brooklyn and other members in Melbourne. The album was recorded between October 2006 and January 2007, at Dave Sitek's (from TV on the Radio) studio in Williamsburg, Brooklyn, and in Sydney's Big Jesus Burger Studios. It was engineered and mixed by Chris Coady, who has previously worked with TV on the Radio, Yeah Yeah Yeahs and Grizzly Bear. The first single from the album, "Heart It Races", was released ahead of the album in May and peaked in the top 50 on the ARIA Singles Chart. Places Like This reached the top 30 on the related albums chart. In the US, the album reached the top 10 on two of Billboard magazine's component charts: Top Electronic Albums and Heatseekers Albums in September.

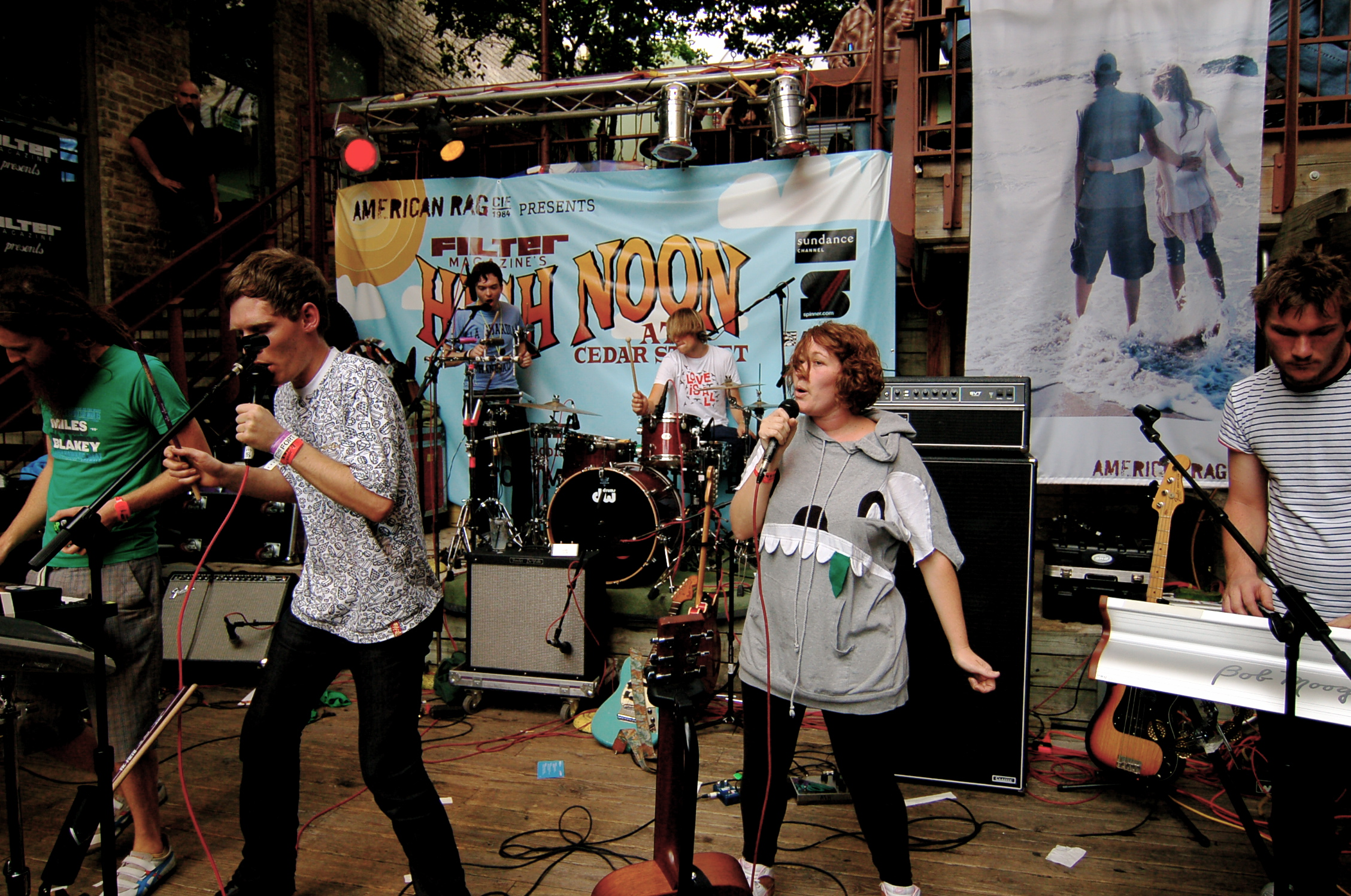
Architecture in Helsinki performing at SXSW in Austin, Texas, in March 2007.

Even though the group's name includes Finland's capital Helsinki, they first played there at the Flow Festival in August 2007: "When we were in Norway at the end of last year there were a few Finnish interviewers who came to interview us mainly about the name. I think they were quite perplexed. To us, the name means having to answer many questions and inquiries about the name, which I guess, is entirely understandable," Sam Perry said.

The band also issued other singles, "Debbie", "Hold Music", and "Like It Or Not". At the ARIA Music Awards of 2007, "Heart It Races" was nominated as "Single of the Year". "Heart It Races" and "Hold Music" were listed in the 2007 Triple J Hottest 100 at No. 19 and No. 36, respectively.

During the ensemble's New Year's Eve performance on 1 January 2008, they came on at midnight and announced that it was James Cecil's last show with Architecture in Helsinki. After leaving the band, Cecil provided backing vocals, engineering and mixing for Kes Band's 2008 album Kes Band, and drums for Qua's 2011 release Q&A.

=== 2008–2012: Moment Bends ===
In mid-2008, the band hired long time mentor and collaborator François Tétaz to help them produce their fourth album. Work began immediately in a new studio space, named Buckingham Palace, that the band had set up in the Melbourne suburb of East Brunswick.

In November 2008, the five-piece band released "That Beep", the first taste of a new sound that they developed with Tétaz over a two-year period. Tétaz was working simultaneously on Gotye's Making Mirrors album, toggling between the two records. In October 2010, the band announced via Twitter that the record was finished after more than two years in self-imposed studio exile.

In January 2011, the first single from the album, "Contact High", was released, which became the most popular song Architecture in Helsinki had released in Australia. It was nominated for "Pop Release of the Year" at the ARIA Music Awards of 2011 and polled at number 12 on the Triple J Hottest 100 for 2011, Australia's largest musical democracy. Moment Bends was released in April 2011 in Australia, and in the US in May 2011. It featured a more detailed, produced and focused pop sound than on their previous records. Moment Bends debuted at number 12 on the ARIA Albums Chart in Australia, the highest chart position for the band. Two further singles from Moment Bends, "Escapee" and "W.O.W", were released. "Escapee" was featured in the football video game, FIFA 12, which was published by EA Sports.

=== 2012–2014: Now + 4eva ===
In early 2012, the band began work on their follow-up to Moment Bends, deciding to stick with the polished pop sound that had worked on the previous album. They recorded in a makeshift studio above a café in Melbourne, which had previously been a hideaway for junkies. As a result, during recording the band tried to combat the negative energy previously associated with the space. To promote the album, they set up a temporary concept store in Melbourne Central Shopping Centre, which was open from 28 March 2014 until 6 April 2014. Bird described the store as "an opportunity to forge a vibrant new connection with our audience and in turn, explore new ideas of what music retail could be". The album was sold on vinyl, CD, cassette, and USB, in addition to other products such as jewelry, drink bottles, rock candy figurines of the band members, a fashion line, and prints of the album's cover art. The products were commissioned from local designers and friends of the band. The singles from the album were "I Might Survive," "In the Future", and "Dream a Little Crazy." It was released on 28 March 2014 in Australia and New Zealand, and on 1 April 2014 in North America.

=== 2014–2018: Final years ===
After the tour cycle for Now + 4eva, the band took an informal sabbatical. Bird stated that, from 2004 to 2014, they had been in a constant album cycle and "there comes a time that you need to step away in order to have that life experience that you can turn into new work". During that time, the band had sporadic performances, including in an episode of the Australian children's educational show Play School, in which they covered the song "Big Bass Drum" with toy instruments. Bird and Cecil also helped produce the second album for The Goon Sax in 2018. In May 2018, the band announced a headline set at Kennedy Art Ball at the Art Gallery of Western Australia in Perth. Bird said that in the current incarnation of the band, there were six members instead of the usual nine. They also announced that they were setting up a space to record new music. Bird said that the band was "not really on a schedule – we're just making, and when we make something that we're proud of, we'll put it out into the world." The band has, however, been completely inactive since this announcement.

== Band members ==
Final lineup

- Cameron Bird – lead and backing vocals, guitar, keyboards (2000–2018)
- Sam Perry – bass guitar, keyboards (2000–2018)
- Kellie Sutherland – lead and backing vocals, keyboards, clarinet (2000–2018)
- Gus Franklin – keyboard, guitar, vocals, trombone, drums (2002–2018)

Former members

- James Cecil – drums, guitars, keyboards (2000–2008)
- Jamie Mildren – guitar, bass guitar, keyboards, flute (2000–2015)
- Tara Shackell – tuba, trombone, keyboards, backing vocals (2002–2006)
- Isobel Knowles – trumpet, keyboards, backing vocals (2002–2006)
- Ben Donnan – drums, keyboards (2008–2014)

== Tours ==
The band toured heavily throughout Australia, the United States, and Europe, playing festivals such as Coachella, Sasquatch, Sound Relief, Big Day Out, SxSW, Primavera, Groovin the Moo, Pukkelpop, and Haldern.

Architecture in Helsinki toured and/or played with: David Byrne, Dr Dog, Death Cab for Cutie, Yacht, The Go-Betweens, Clap Your Hands Say Yeah, Santigold, Glass Candy, The Presets, Black Moth Super Rainbow, Au Revoir Simone, Field Music, Lo-Fi-Fnk, Yo La Tengo, The Polyphonic Spree, and Múm.

== Discography ==
=== Studio albums ===
List of studio albums, with selected details and chart positions
Title	Album details	Peak chart positions		
Title	Album details	AUS	FRA	US Heat
Fingers Crossed	Released: 9 February 2003; Label: Trifekta; Formats: LP, CD, download	—	—	—
In Case We Die	Released: 5 April 2005; Label: Tailem Bend; Formats: LP, CD, download	67	159	—
Places Like This	Released: 28 July 2007; Label: Tailem Bend; Formats: LP, CD, download	30	187	7
Moment Bends	Released: 8 April 2011; Label: Modular; Formats: LP, CD, download	12	—	—
Now + 4eva	Released: 28 March 2014; Label: Casual Workout; Formats: LP, CD, cassette, download	25	—	—
"—" denotes releases that did not chart or were not released in that territory.

=== Compilation albums ===
List of compilation albums, with selected details
Title	Details
We Died, They Remixed	Released: 11 December 2006; Label: Tailem Bend (B000JLPO6A); Formats: CD, download (remix album)

=== Extended plays ===
List of EPs, with selected details
Title	Details
Keepsake	Released: March 2004; Label: Trifekta (HORSE038-2); Format: CD; Note: Remix EP to celebrate first US tour

=== Singles ===
Year	Title	Peak chart positions					Album
Year	Title	AUS	Triple J 100	UK	US Sales	US Dance	Album
2003	"Like a Call"	—	—	—	—	—	Fingers Crossed
2003	"Fumble"	—	—	—	—	—	Fingers Crossed
2004	"Kindling"	179	—	—	—	—	Fingers Crossed
2004	"Do the Whirlwind"	—	—	168	—	—	In Case We Die
2005	"Maybe You Can Owe Me"	—	—	—	—	—	In Case We Die
2005	"It'5!"	—	56	—	—	—	In Case We Die
2006	"Wishbone"	—	—	—	—	—	In Case We Die
2007	"Heart It Races"	47	19	—	18	3	Places Like This
2007	"Hold Music"	—	36	—	—	—	Places Like This
2008	"Like It or Not"	—	—	—	—	—	Moment Bends
2008	"That Beep"	75	28	—	—	—	Moment Bends
2011	"Contact High"	70	12	—	—	—	Moment Bends
2011	"Escapee"	118	55	—	—	—	Moment Bends
2013	"Living in the Future"	199	—	—	—	—	Now + 4eva
2013	"Dream a Little Crazy"	—	—	—	—	—	Now + 4eva
2014	"I Might Survive"	—	—	—	—	—	Now + 4eva
"—" denotes a recording that did not chart or was not released in that territory.

=== Remixes ===
Year	Artist	Track	Version	Album name
2003	B(if)tek	"Hi Fi Kids"	Architecture in Helsinki Remix	Frequencies Will Move Together
2006	Shout Out Louds	"Very Loud"	Architecture in Helsinki Remix	Combines EP
2007	Bonde do Rolê	"Office Boy"	Architecture in Helsinki Remix	Office Boy EP
2007	The Bumblebeez	"Dr Love"	Architecture in Helsinki's Dr Hookah Mix	Dr Love EP
2007	Yacht	"See a Penny (Pick It Up)"	Architecture in Helsinki Remix	I Believe in You. Your Magic Is Real
2007	33 Hz	"Paris, Texas"	Architecture in Helsinki's Supermelody Remix	Paris, Texas (Remixes)
2008	Midnight Juggernauts	"Into the Galaxy"	Architecture in Helsinki's Choose Your Own Adventure Mix	Dystopia
2009	Metronomy	"A Thing for Me"	Architecture in Helsinki Remix	Nights Out
2009	The Very Best	"Warm Heart of Africa"	Architecture in Helsinki Remix	Warm Heart of Africa
2009	El Guincho	"Antillas"	Architecture in Helsinki Remix	Alegranza!
2011	Cut Copy	"Need You Now"	Architecture in Helsinki Remix	Zonoscope

=== Music videos ===
Year	Title	Director(s)
2003	"Like a Call"	Isobel Knowles
2003	"Kindling"	Kellie Sutherland
2005	"It'5!"	Isobel Knowles, Ali Dullard
2005	"Do the Whirlwind" (Australian version)	Paul Robertson
2006	"Do the Whirlwind" (UK version)	Nima Nourizadeh
2006	"Wishbone"	Isobel Knowles
2007	"Heart It Races"	Kris Moyes
2007	"Hold Music"	Kim Gehrig
2007	"Debbie"	Josh Logue
2008	"Like It or Not"	Josh Logue
2008	"That Beep"	Krozm
2011	"Contact High"	Krozm
2011	"Escapee"	Marcus Soderlund
2011	"W.O.W"	Krozm
2014	"Dream a Little Crazy"	Lucy McRae
2014	"I Might Survive"	Andrew Goldsmith

== Awards and nominations ==
=== ARIA Music Awards ===
The ARIA Music Awards are a set of annual ceremonies presented by Australian Recording Industry Association (ARIA), which recognise excellence, innovation, and achievement across all genres of the music of Australia. They commenced in 1987.

Year	Nominee / work	Award	Result	Ref.
2011	Moment Bends	Best Pop Release	Nominated	

=== Australian Music Prize ===
The Australian Music Prize (the AMP) is an annual award of $30,000 given to an Australian band or solo artist in recognition of the merit of an album released during the year of award. They commenced in 2005.

Year	Nominee / work	Award	Result
2007	Places Like This	Australian Music Prize	Nominated

=== J Awards ===
The J Awards are an annual series of Australian music awards that were established by the Australian Broadcasting Corporation's youth-focused radio station Triple J. They commenced in 2005.

Year	Nominee / work	Award	Result
2005	In Case We Die	Australian Album of the Year	Nominated
2007	Places Like This	Australian Album of the Year	Nominated
