= Mousampur =

- village
- Country: India
- State: Rajasthan

Languages
  - Official: Hindi
- Time zone: UTC+5:30 (IST)
- ISO 3166 code: RJ-IN

Mousampur is a small village in Alwar district of Rajasthan, a state in northern India. It has about 500 population. Mousampur has one upper primary school, aganbadi center, and a few temples. The main occupation is farming. The village has only Hindus. It is "Yadav" (Ahir) majority village. There are others castes as well including Panjabi, Baniya, Carpenters (Khati), Barbers (Sain), SCs (Verma), Jogis, Mathurs etc. Mosumpur was under General Fateh Naseeb Khan who was a General in Alwar armed forces Under Maharaja Jai Singh Prabhakar Bahadur. Raja Jai Singh gave this village to his trusted Gernal Fateh.

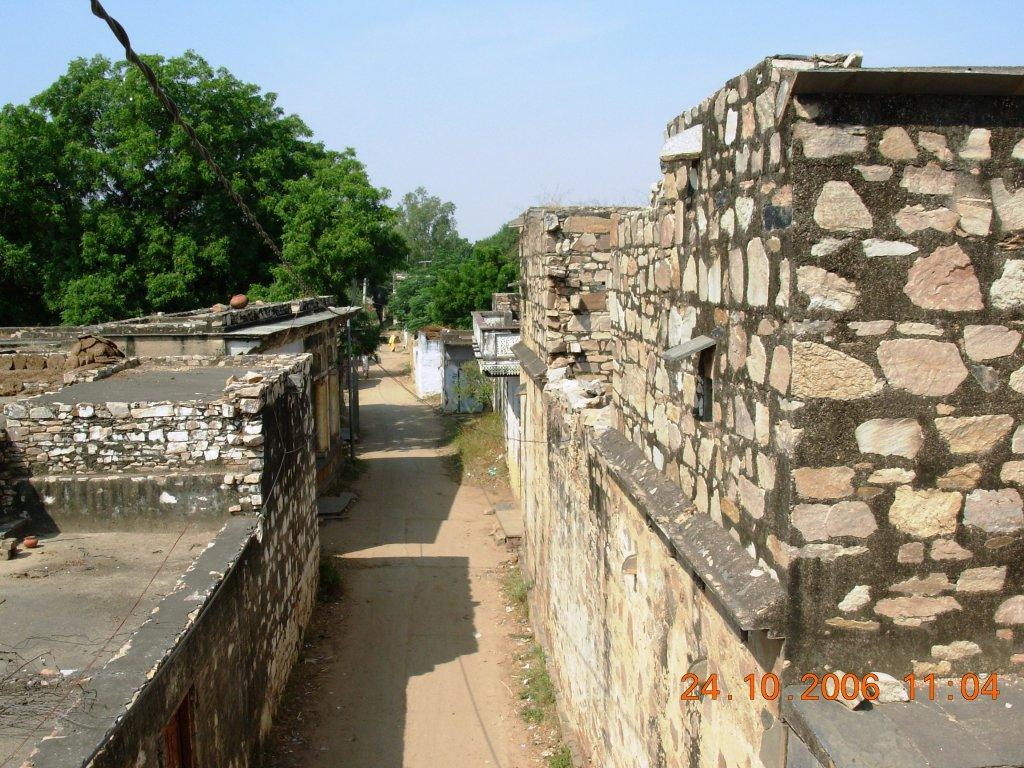
Main Street

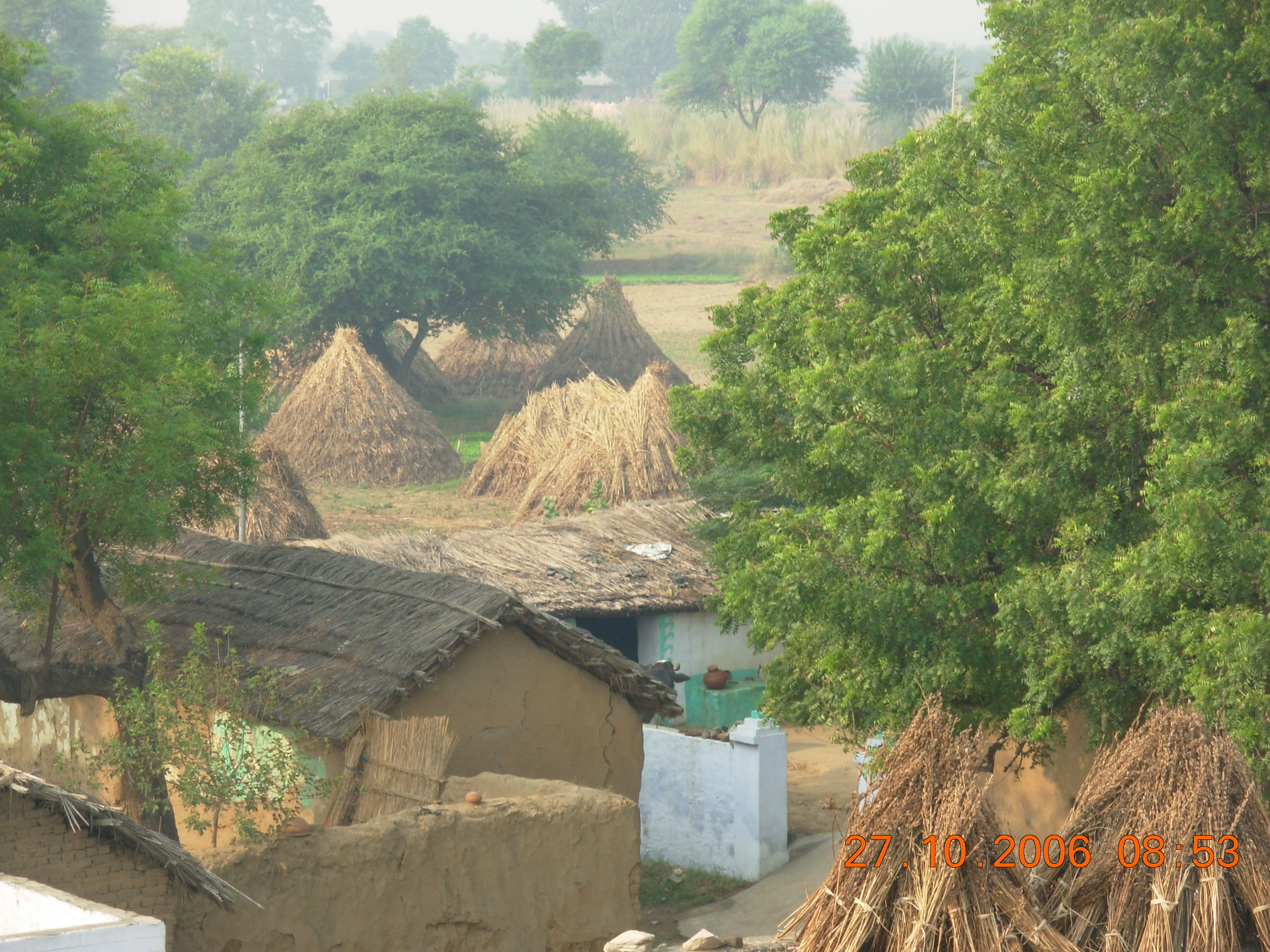
An early Morning

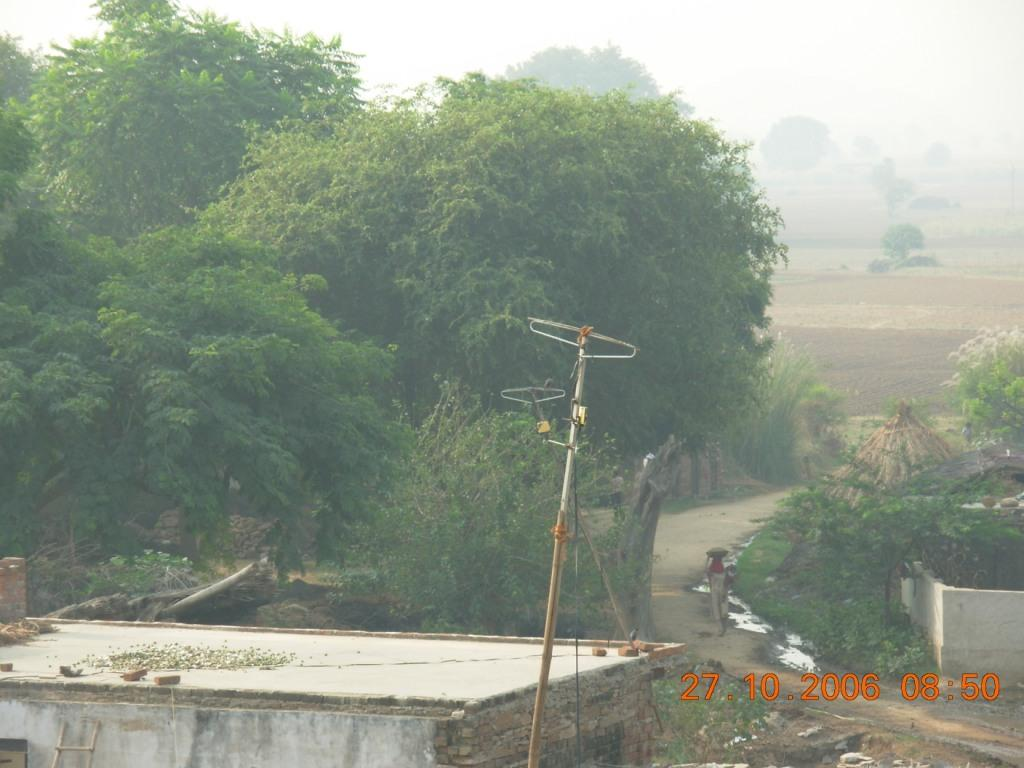
An early morning

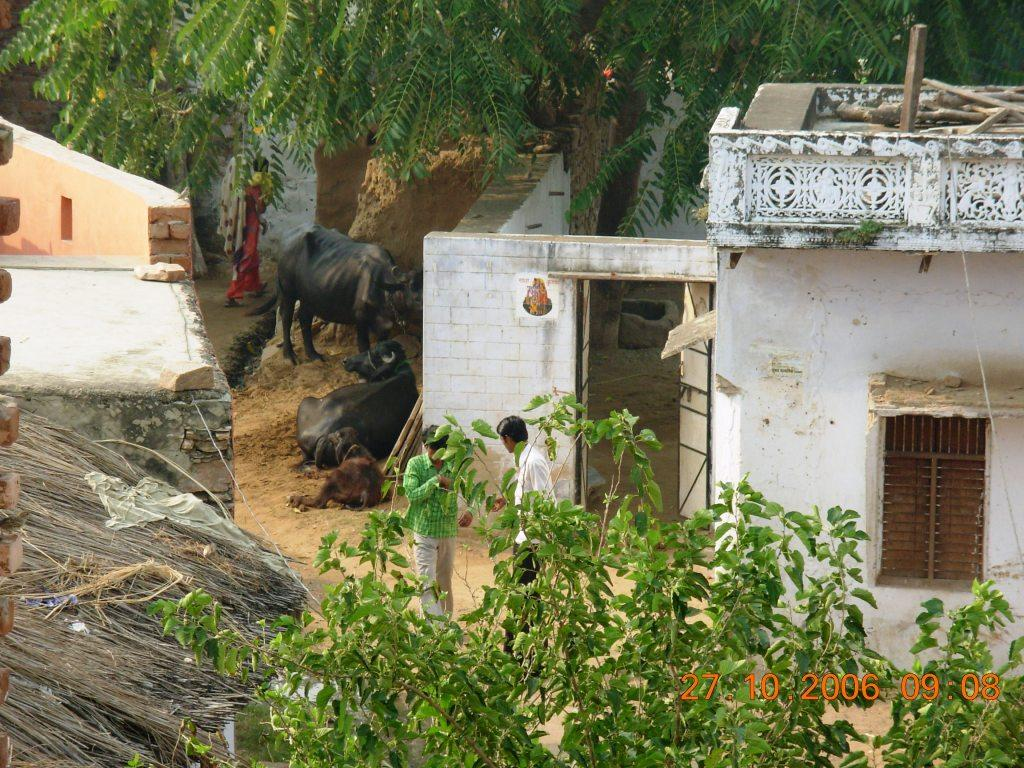
Buffalos

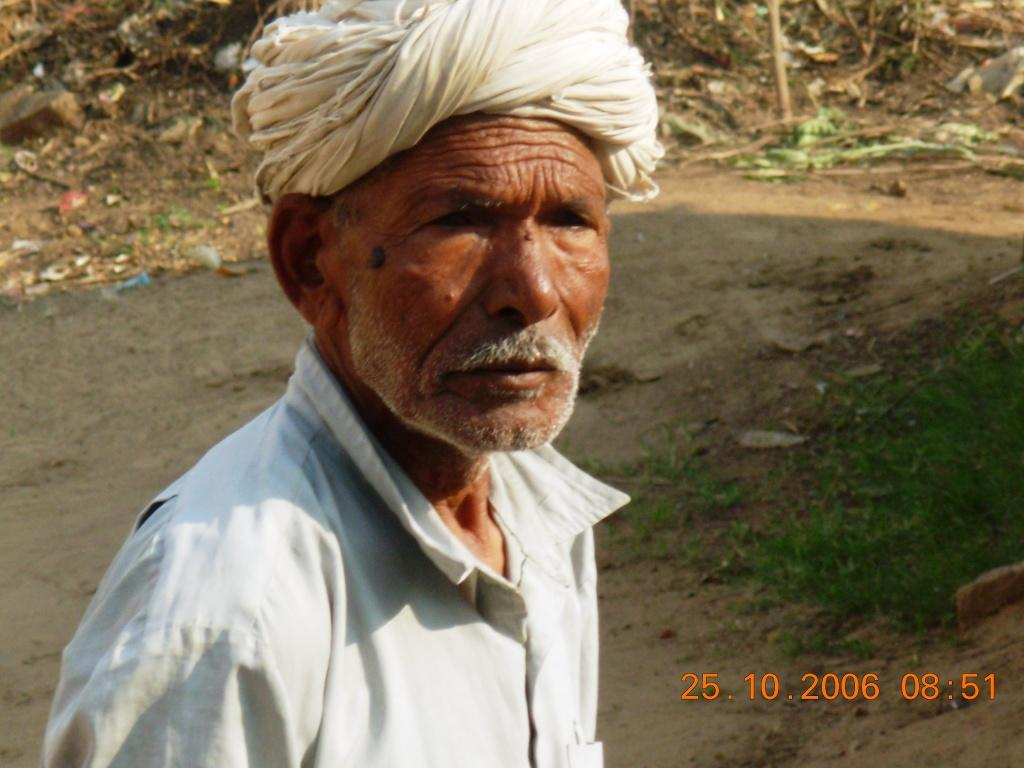
The Buddha

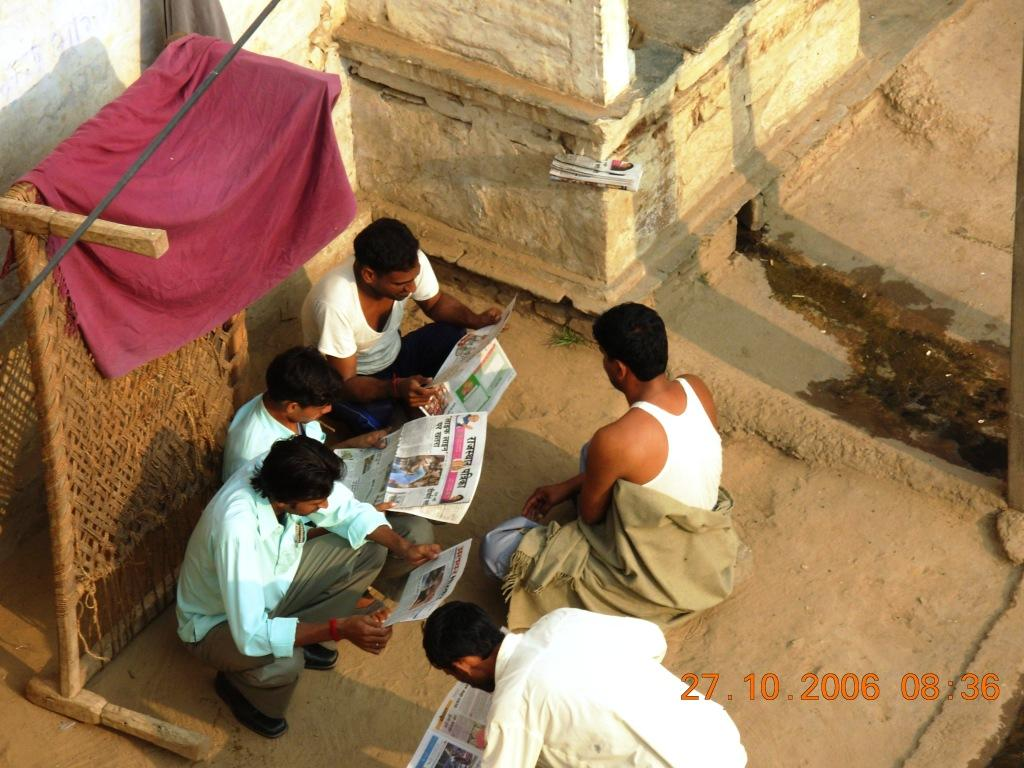
Villagers reading news paper

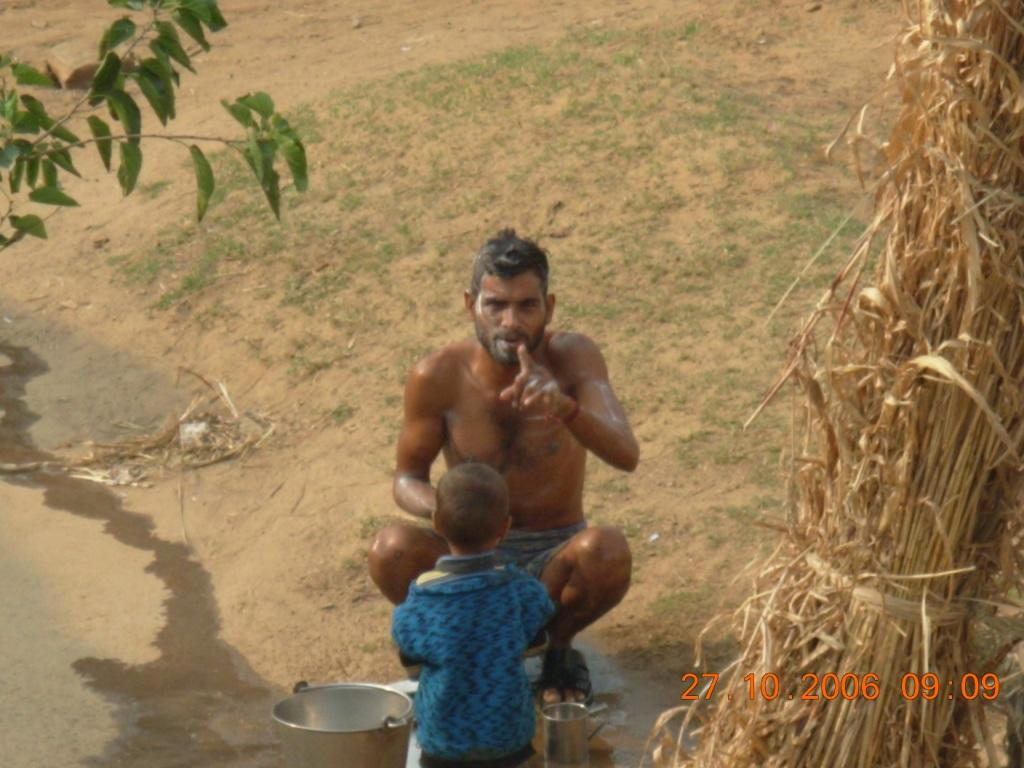
A Villages taking Bath

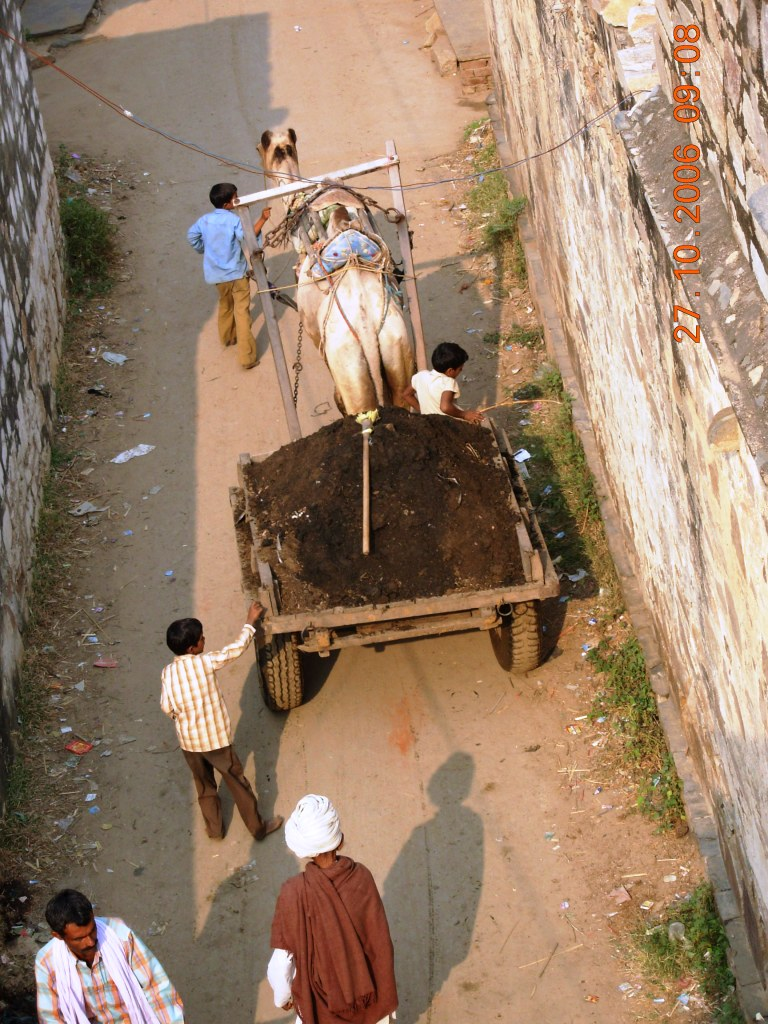
Camel Cart

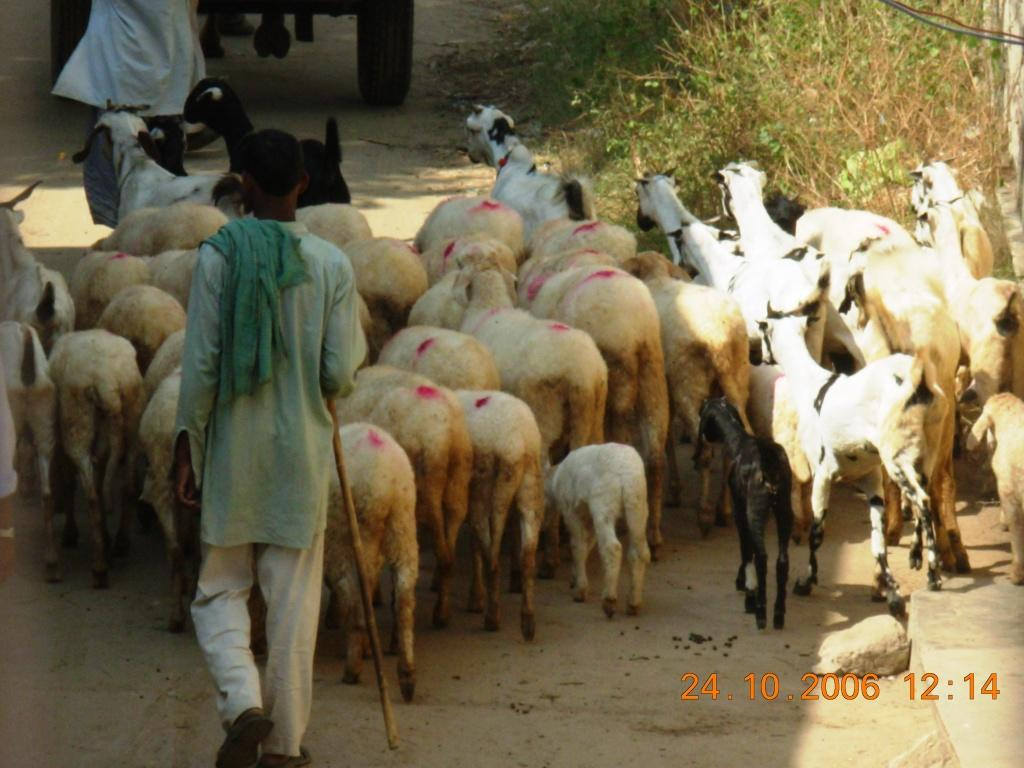
Sheep and Goats

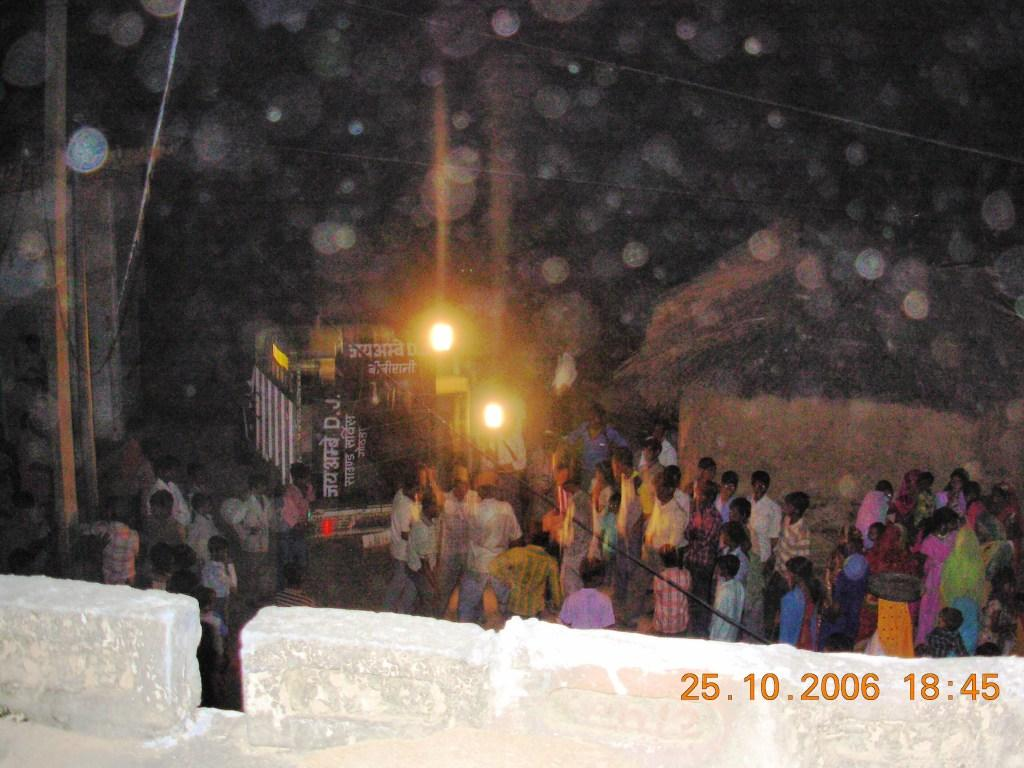
Late Evening Celebration

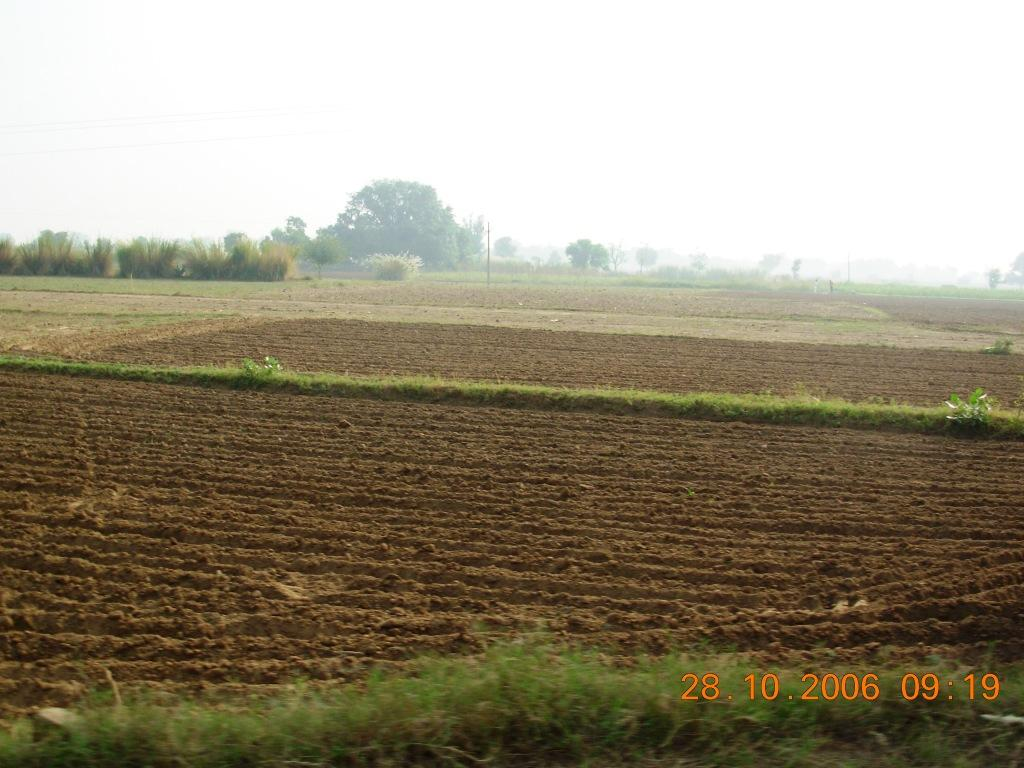
Farms

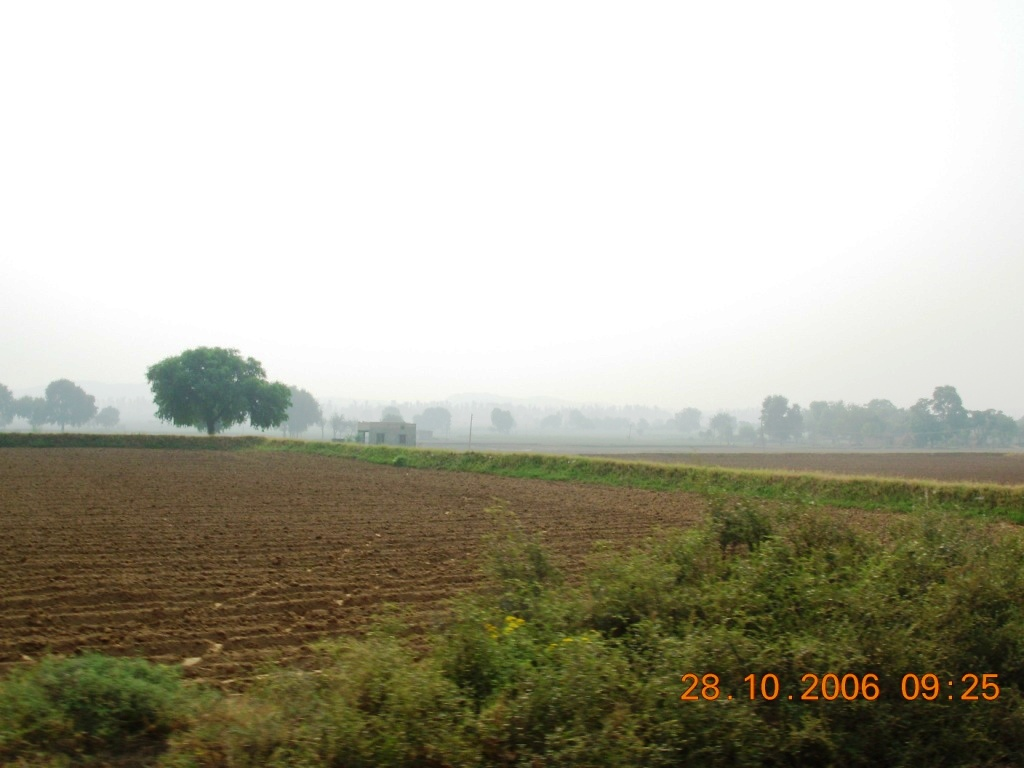
Farms

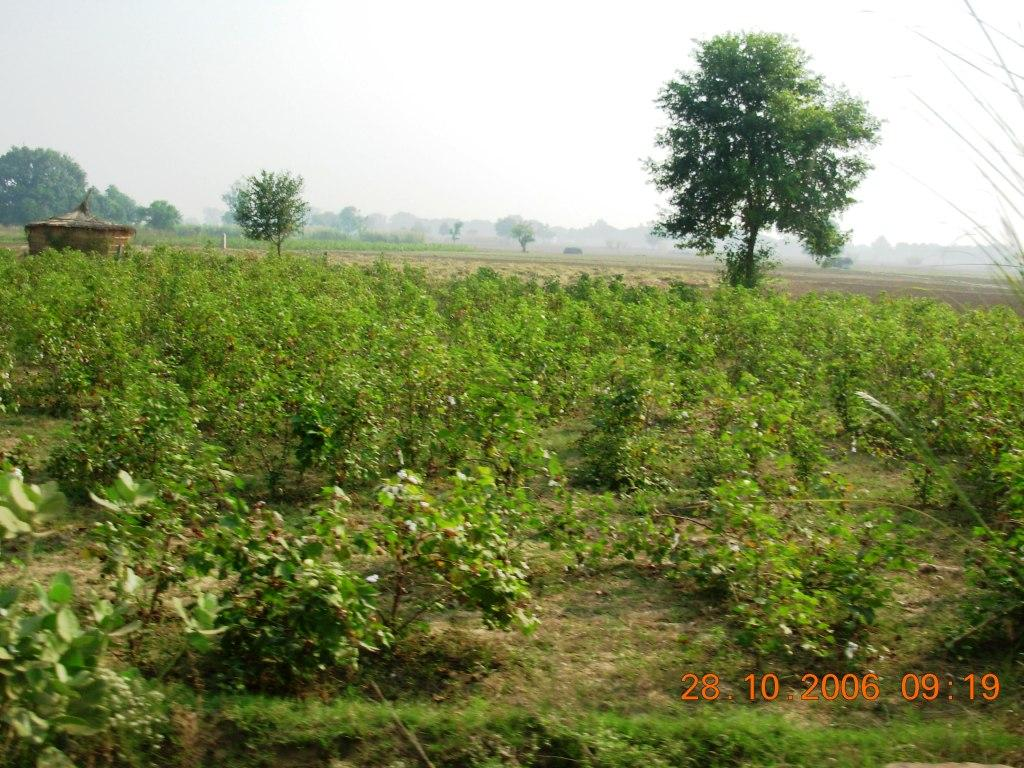
Farms

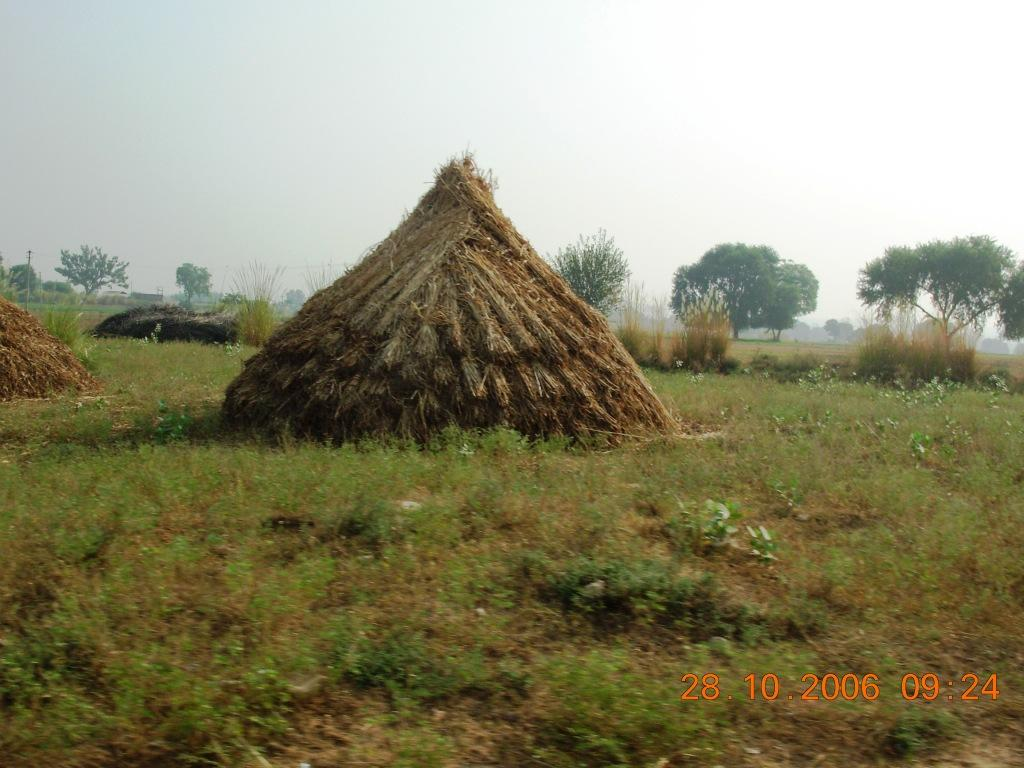
Farms

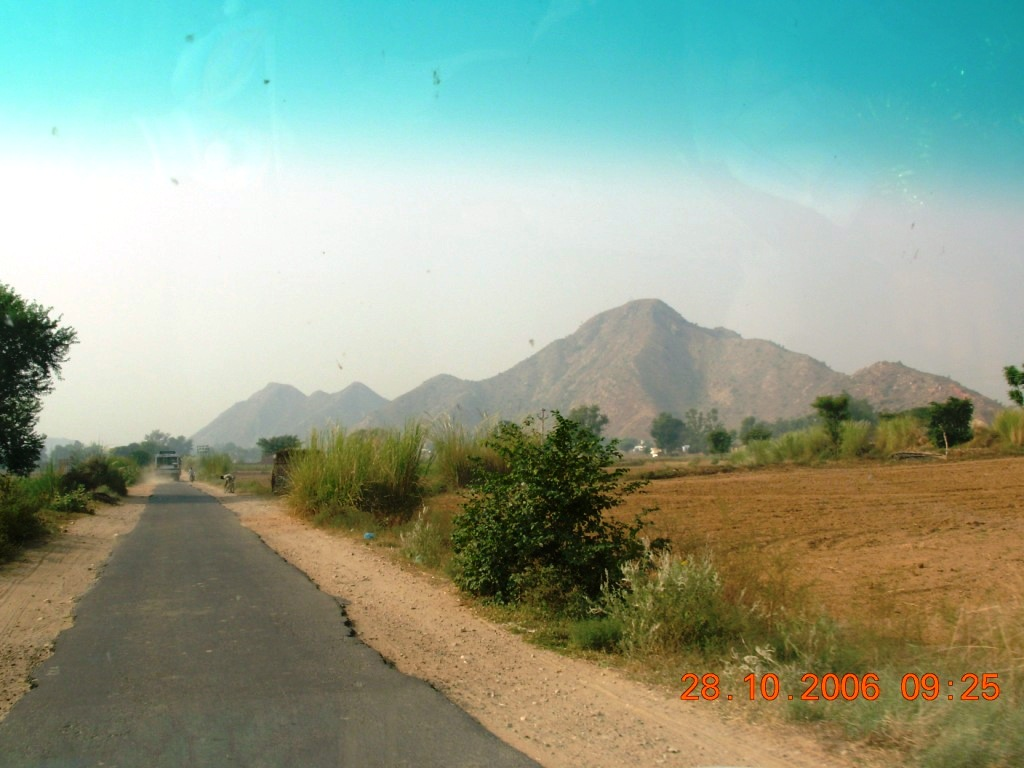
Roads to Village

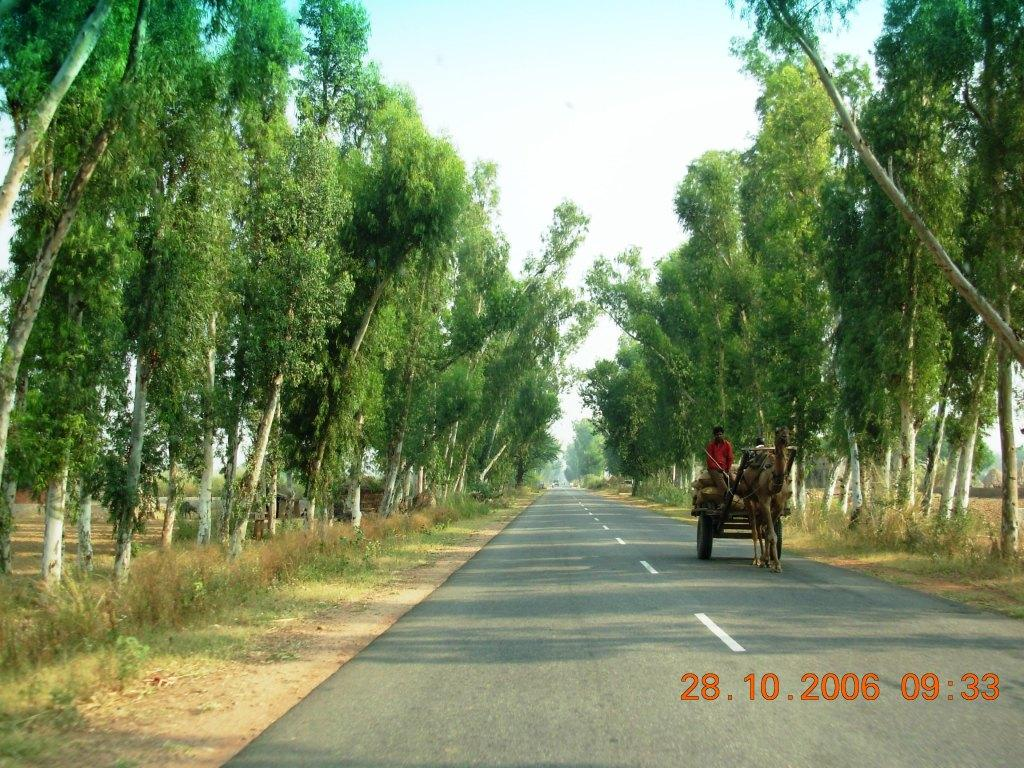
Roads to Village

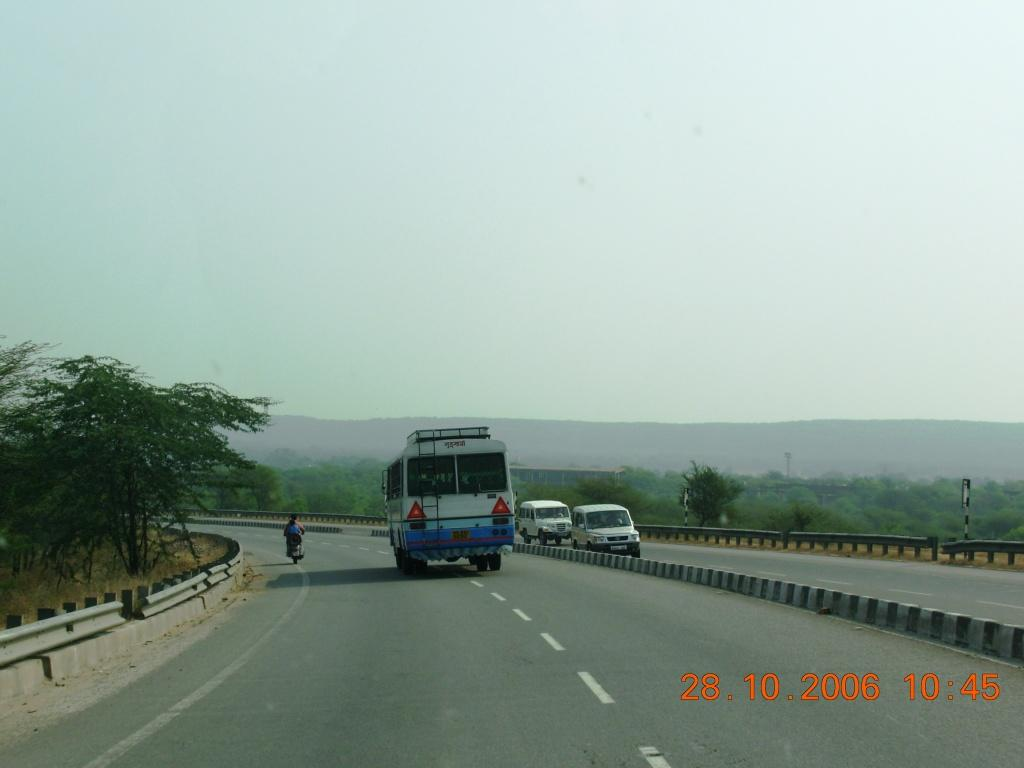
Main Road
