= Monsoon (Caroline's Spine album) =

Studio album by Caroline's Spine
- Released: April 22, 1997
- Genre: Post-grunge, Alternative rock
- Label: Hollywood
- Producer: Jimmy Newquist

Caroline's Spine chronology
Huge (1996)	Monsoon (1997)	Attention Please (1999)

Professional ratings
Review scores
Source	Rating
Allmusic	3/5 stars

Monsoon is the fifth studio album and first major label album by American alternative rock band Caroline's Spine. It featured almost entirely songs that can be found on their previous independent releases but were re-recorded or remastered for this album. The single "Sullivan" climbed to #23 on Billboard’s Mainstream Rock chart, as well as #14 on R&R’s Active Rock Chart. The success of this album also earned them a gig playing on board the United States Navy aircraft carrier USS Enterprise.

== Track listing ==
All songs written by Jimmy Newquist.

1. "King For a Day" – 3:17
2. "You & Me" – 4:22
3. "Sullivan" – 4:05
4. "Wallflower" – 4:56
5. "Monsoon" – 4:34
6. "Unglued" – 2:38
7. "Trio' Pain" – 2:50
8. "Psycho" – 3:19
9. "Necro" – 3:07
10. "So Good Afternoon" – 5:32
11. "Say it to You" – 3:22
12. "Sweet N' Sour" – 3:08
13. "Hippie Boy" – 4:30

== Personnel ==
- Jimmy Newquist - vocals, guitar, bass, discipline
- Mark Haugh - guitar, vocals, the way
- Jason Gilardi - drums and protection
- Scott Jones - bass, vocals, snacker

=== Additional personnel ===
- Edgar "Chodie" Knoll - sound

=== Technical ===
Information from album liner.

- Produced by Jimmy Newquist and Caroline's Spine
- Executive producer and A&R direction: Mitchell Leib
- All words and music by Jimmy Newquist (BMI)
- Recorded by Dan Calderone
  - Assistant Joe Statt
- Recorded at ANZA Digital - San Diego, California
- Mixed by Nick DiDia
  - Assistant Caram Costanzo
- Mixed at Southern Tracks Studios - Atlanta, GA
- Mastered by Stephen Marcussen at Precision Mastering

=== Managerial and design ===
- The law - David Rudich Esq.
- Business manager - Shapiro and Company
- Management - Doc McGhee and Sandy Rizzo for McGhee Entertainment
- Creative director - Dave Snow
- Art direction and design - Jennifer Tough
- Photography - Matthew Welch
- Cover photograph - Renard Garr
- Styling - Keki Mingus
- Hair and grooming - Natalie McGowan Spencer
- Calligraphy - Nancy Ogami
