= Moushumi Kandali =

- Born: Assam, India
- Occupations: Writer, Art Historian, Academician
- Relatives: Swapnarka Arnan (Son); Khudindra Nath Kandali (Father); Tarulata Kandali (Mother); Monimala Kandali (Sister); Mallika Kandali (Sister)
- Writing career
- Genre: Assamese literature
- Subject: Contemporary
- Notable works: Lambada Nachor Seshot; Tritiyottor Golpo; Mockdrill; The Black Magic women

Moushumi Kandali (Assamese: মৌচুমী কন্দলী) is a writer, historian and translator from Assam, India. Kandali won the Munin Barkataki Award in 2000 for her first collection of short stories, Lambada Nachor Seshot, which was published in 1998. She is a researcher and writer of fiction as well as art. She works as an assistant professor in the Department of Cultural Studies in Tezpur University, Assam.

== Early life and education ==
Kandali graduated from Cotton College, Guwahati. In 1998, she received her master's degree in philosophy with a Gold Medal from Gauhati University. She then obtained her master's degree in Art History and Aesthetics from MS University, Baroda. She also received her Doctorate in Fine Arts from the same university.

== Career ==
She translated Salvador Dalí's Diary of A Genius into Assamese language. She has also translated Mishing folk poetry into English (Listen My Flower-bud : Mishing Oral Poetry of Assam), and it was published by the Sahitya Akademi in 2008. In 2022, an English translation of her story, The Black Magic Women was published.
