= Attention Please (Caroline's Spine album) =

Studio album by Caroline's Spine
- Released: August 17th, 1999
- Genre: Alternative rock
- Label: Hollywood Records
- Producer: Mitchell Leib

Caroline's Spine chronology
Monsoon (1997)	Attention Please (1999)	Like it or Not (2000)

Professional ratings
Review scores
Source	Rating
Ink 19	(not rated)
AllMusic	3/5 stars

Attention Please is the sixth studio album and second major label album by American alternative rock band Caroline's Spine. It was their first album of all new material since the band formed. The songs "Attention Please" and "Nothing to Prove" which both charted on the Billboard Mainstream Rock Tracks chart at #30 and #23, respectively. Despite the album's success, it was not well promoted by the label and led the band to return to producing their albums independently for future releases. This album also featured a remix of the track "Turned Blue" which was featured on the An American Werewolf in Paris film soundtrack.

== Track listing ==
All songs written by Jimmy Newquist.

1. "Attention Please" – 3:06
2. "Deep in Your Wake" – 2:48
3. "Nothing to Prove" – 3:22
4. "Ready, Set, Go" – 2:48
5. "Rock And Roll Hero" – 3:51
6. "Inside Your Mind" – 3:29
7. "Open Fire" – 3:47
8. "Turned Blue" – 2:55
9. "Work Song" – 3:09
10. "Happy Without You" – 2:46
11. "Again & Again" – 2:53
12. "True Star" – 3:00

== Band lineup ==
- Jimmy Newquist - vocals, guitar, bass
- Mark Haugh - guitar, backing vocals
- Jason Gilardi - drums and percussion
- Scott Jones - bass, backing vocals
