= Fingers Crossed (album) =

Studio album by Architecture in Helsinki
- Released: 9 February 2003
- Recorded: 14 July 2001 – 18 December 2002
- Studio: Super Melody World, Melbourne
- Genre: Indie pop
- Length: 37:21
- Label: Trifekta
- Producer: Cameron Bird

Architecture in Helsinki chronology
Fingers Crossed (2003)	In Case We Die (2005)

Fingers Crossed is the debut studio album by Australian indie pop band Architecture in Helsinki, which was released on 9 February 2003 by independent record label Trifekta.

It is known especially for its gentle, high-pitched synthesizers and an ambitiously wide array of musical instruments, many unconventional and prominent. The instruments used include glockenspiel, woodwinds, xylophone, flute, four different kinds of guitar, trumpet, tuba, trombone, melodica, thumb piano, clarinet, recorder, bass, and various drums and percussion including hand claps, finger snaps, and the taps of tap shoes. It also uses a variety of voices, mainly in gender and age.

In 2007, "Souvenirs" received attention for its use in a Sprint Nextel commercial., and in 2009 excerpts from the song were used in a popular commercial for Fanta in the United Kingdom.

== Critical reception ==
Professional ratings
Review scores
Source	Rating
AllMusic	4/5 stars
BigYawn	7.7/10
Pitchfork	8.2/10
Prefix Mag	4.5/5 stars
Stylus Magazine	D−

AllMusic's Heather Phares felt the album showed a "very appealing collage of electronic and indie pop." Dan of BigYawn initially "had some trouble deciding whether or not I really enjoyed the debut album" but ultimately declared "The songs are catchy enough, and their unique instrumentation and feel for textured sounds show great promise." Jenny Yuen of Prefix Mag noted "[it] should be categorized as a kids' soundtrack. It captures innocence at its best moments by using a ridiculous number of instruments (thirty-one, to be exact) that could keep a marching band happy, all of which makes up fourteen very shiny and happy songs." However, Stylus Magazine's Akiva Gottlieb "[found] their puerile, psychologically regressive child's play boring and self-absorbed".

== Track listing ==
No.	Title	Length
1.	"One Heavy February"	0:59
2.	"Souvenirs"	2:26
3.	"Imaginary Ordinary"	2:17
4.	"Scissor Paper Rock"	2:30
5.	"To and Fro"	2:33
6.	"Spring 2008"	2:52
7.	"The Owls Go"	3:35
8.	"Fumble"	3:07
9.	"Kindling"	1:49
10.	"It's Almost a Trap"	2:22
11.	"Like a Call"	3:06
12.	"Where You've Been Hiding"	2:41
13.	"City Calm Down"	2:50
14.	"Vanishing"	4:13
