= Sullivan (song) =

Single by Caroline's Spine

from the album Monsoon
- Released: 1997
- Length: 4:05
- Label: Hollywood
- Songwriter(s): Jimmy Newquist
- Producer(s): Jimmy Newquist

Caroline's Spine singles chronology
"Sullivan" (1997)	"Wallflower" (1999)

"Sullivan" is a song by Caroline's Spine and the debut single from their major label debut album, Monsoon. It was previously included on their independently released albums, Ignore the Ants and Huge, in 1995 and '96. The song was later included on the 2006 compilation, The Collection. It quickly became the band's most popular song, reaching #23 on Billboard's Mainstream Rock Tracks.

== Overview ==
The song tells the true story of five siblings, the Sullivan brothers from Waterloo, Iowa, who died aboard the USS Juneau in World War II. Lyrically, it focuses on Mrs. Sullivan's communication both with her sons and the military. Caroline's Spine singer and main songwriter Jimmy Newquist wrote the song after reading the war documentary Hollywood Goes to War. Regarding his inspiration, he remarked:

"Coming from a big family, the story of five brothers really struck home with me. . . I saw a news clipping with a photo of Mrs. Sullivan holding a banner with five gold stars - one for each of her dead sons. It's a really sad story with incredible loyalty and courage."

Newquist later noted, "The song was an act of love. . . I sleep well at night knowing that I brought attention to something that shouldn't be forgotten." He has also regarded it among his top favorite Caroline's Spine songs.

Musically, "Sullivan" opens with a galloping bass line before kicking into a full instrumental intro complete with a somber, three-note lead guitar. The verses maintain a quick tempo and detail the Sullivans' boarding a train and writing to their mother about the war. The first two choruses feature messages from the military to Mrs. Sullivan regarding the enlistment and status of her sons; the last line of each encourages Mrs. Sullivan to "keep her Blue Star in the window." A gentle melody and slowing in pace mark the bridge before declaring the Sullivan boys' tragic demise. As the intensity returns, a third chorus informs Mrs. Sullivan of their death in the same fashion as those prior, suggesting that she "change her Blue Star to Gold."

"Sullivan" was originally written as a stripped down acoustic song in contrast to the full-fledged electric ensemble recorded for the album. Such an acoustic version was also recorded, however, and has received occasional radio play since the success of the original single.

== Live performances ==
As one of their most famous songs, "Sullivan" is a Caroline's Spine concert staple. The song also earned the band a gig on the USS Enterprise in 1998.

On November 16, 2008, the Sullivan Brothers Iowa Veterans Museum opened to the public in Waterloo, Iowa, and at the event, Jimmy Newquist performed an acoustic rendition of the song. Kelly Sullivan Loughren, granddaughter of Albert Sullivan, spoke at the event and later praised the performance, saying "That was really special to hear that song. . . He just brought me to tears."

== Reception ==
Ned Raggett of Allmusic declared "Sullivan" the greatest track on Monsoon. He praised it as "a surprisingly affecting reworking of the story," adding "Newquist's voice is both affecting and yearning, and the abrupt lead guitar figure is downright beautiful. If the band deserves to be remembered for anything, it's this great radio-ready history lesson that connects rather than patronizes."

== Music video ==
The "Sullivan" video debuted in late 1997. It features black & white footage of the band performing and the 1944 biographical war film The Fighting Sullivans.

== Chart positions ==
Chart (1998)	Peak position
Active Rock	18
Billboard Mainstream Rock Tracks	23

== See also ==
- List of anti-war songs
