= List of awards and nominations received by Lana Del Rey =

Lana Del Rey awards and nominations
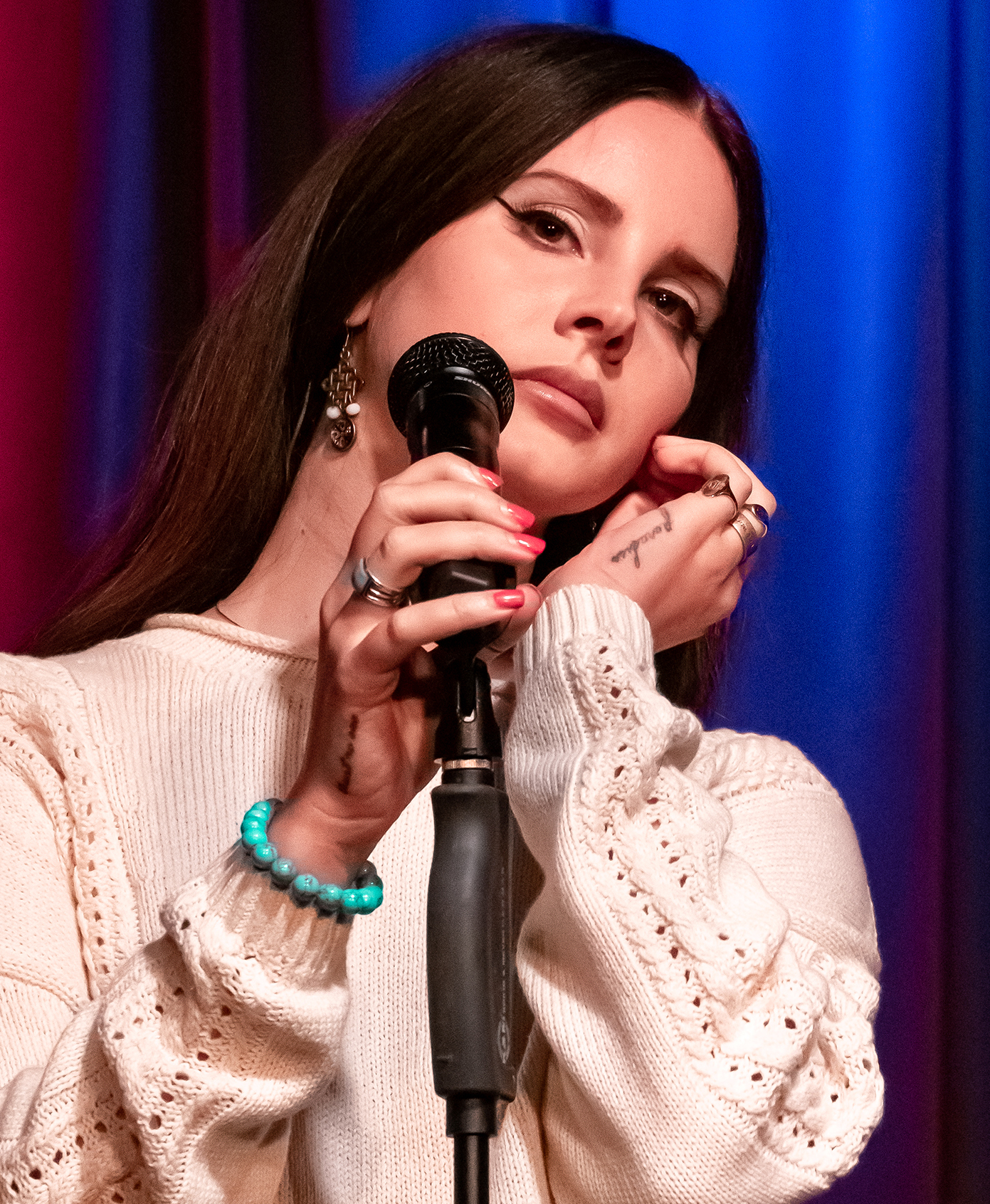
- Del Rey at the Grammy Museum in 2019
Awards and nominations
Award	Wins	Nominations
Billboard Music Awards	0	1
Billboard Women in Music	2	2
Brit Awards	3	7
Critics' Choice Movie Awards	0	2
Golden Globe Awards	0	1
Grammy Awards	0	11
MTV Europe Music Awards	3	8
MTV Video Music Awards	1	6
Ivor Novello Awards	2	2
Satellite Awards	1	2
GAFFA Awards	10	18
Variety Hitmakers Awards	1	1

Totals (Note: Certain award groups do not simply award one winner. They acknowledge several different recipients, have runners-up, and have third place. Since this is a specific recognition and is different from losing an award, runner-up mentions are considered wins in this award tally. For simplification and to avoid errors, each award in this list has been presumed to have had a prior nomination.)
- Wins: 129
- Nominations: 184

Lana Del Rey is an American singer-songwriter. She began writing songs at the age of 18, and started performing in nightclubs in Brooklyn, New York City. After meeting Van Wilson, an A&R executive for the independent label 5 Points Records, at a songwriting competition, she signed a record deal with the label in 2007, and began working with the producer David Kahne. Together, they composed her debut extended play, Kill Kill, which was released in 2008, and her debut studio album, Lana Del Ray, which was shelved initially, and eventually released in 2010. Three months after the release of Lana Del Ray, Del Rey met her managers Ben Mawson and Ed Millett, who helped her break off her contract with 5 Points Records, where, in her opinion, "nothing was happening". Shortly after, she moved to London and lived with Mawson "for a few years".

In 2011, Del Rey was signed by Stranger Records and released her debut single, "Video Games". The song won the Ivor Novello Award for Best Contemporary Song. Her second single "Born to Die" won the UK Music Video Award for Best International Pop Video in 2012. Born to Die, Del Rey's second studio album, was released in early 2012, and was the year's fifth best-selling album worldwide. As of June 2014, it has sold more than seven million copies. She won the Brit Award for International Breakthrough Act, the Q Award for Next Big Thing, and the GQ Award for Woman of the Year in 2012. In late 2012, Born to Die was re-packaged with the extended play, Paradise, as Born to Die: The Paradise Edition.

In 2013, Del Rey won the Brit Award for International Female Solo Artist, as well as the Echo Awards for Best International Female Artist Rock/Pop and Best International Newcomer. She also recorded the song "Young and Beautiful" for the soundtrack of the 2013 film adaptation of F. Scott Fitzgerald's The Great Gatsby, which won the Satellite Award for Best Original Song. At the 2015 MTV Europe Music Awards, Del Rey won the MTV Europe Music Award for Best Alternative. In November 2015, Del Rey received the Trailblazer Award at the Billboard Women in Music ceremony. In December 2021, Del Rey has been recognized with the Variety's Decade Award at the Variety Hitmakers Awards. She's also the first woman who received Visionary Award in the Billboard Women in Music Awards 2023.

== Awards and nominations ==
Award	Year (Note: Indicates the year of ceremony. Each year is linked to the article about the awards held that year, wherever possible.)	Recipient(s) and nominee(s)	Category	Result	Ref.
AMFT Awards (Note: AMFT Awards is an online awards group.)	2019	Norman Fucking Rockwell!	Album of the Year	Won	
AMFT Awards	2019	Norman Fucking Rockwell!	Best Alternative Album	Won	
Apple Music 100 Best Awards (Note: According to Apple Music, every artist of the "100 Best Albums" list receives an award)	2024	Norman Fucking Rockwell!	100 Best Albums	Won	
ASCAP Pop Music Awards	2018	Lana Del Rey	Global Impact Award	Won	
BreakTudo Awards	2023	Lana Del Rey	International Female Artist	Nominated	
BreakTudo Awards	2024	Lana Del Rey	International Female Artist	Won	
Berlin Music Video Awards	2021	Chemtrails over the Country Club	Best Cinematography	Nominated	
Empik Bestsellers Awards	2024	Did You Know That There's a Tunnel Under Ocean Blvd	Music: Pop	Nominated	
Empik Bestsellers Awards	2024	Lana Del Rey	Musical Artist of the Year	Won	
Billboard.com Mid-Year Music Awards	2012	Lana Del Rey	Most Overrated Artist	3rd place	
Billboard.com Mid-Year Music Awards	2012	Lana Del Rey	Best Newcomer	Runner-up	
Billboard.com Mid-Year Music Awards	2014	Lana Del Rey	Best Festival Performance	Won	
Billboard Music Awards	2014	Born to Die	Top Rock Album	Nominated	
Billboard Women in Music	2015	Lana Del Rey	Trailblazer Award	Won	
Billboard Women in Music	2023	Lana Del Rey	Visionary Award	Won	
BMI Pop Music Awards	2024	"Snow on the Beach" (with Taylor Swift)	Most-Performed Songs of the Year	Won	
Brit Awards	2012	Lana Del Rey	International Breakthrough Act	Won	
Brit Awards	2013	Lana Del Rey	International Female Solo Artist	Won	
Brit Awards	2015	Lana Del Rey	International Female Solo Artist	Nominated	
Brit Awards	2016	Lana Del Rey	International Female Solo Artist	Nominated	
Brit Awards	2020	Lana Del Rey	International Female Solo Artist	Nominated	
Brit Awards	2023	Lana Del Rey	Brit Billion Award	Won	
Brit Awards	2024	Lana Del Rey	International Solo Artist	Nominated	
Critics' Choice Movie Awards	2014	"Young and Beautiful"	Best Song	Nominated	
Critics' Choice Movie Awards	2015	"Big Eyes"	Best Song	Nominated	
Danish Music Awards	2012	Born to Die	International Album of the Year	Won	
Digital Spy Reader Awards	2012	Born to Die	Best Album	Won	
Echo Awards	2012	"Video Games"	Hit of the Year	Nominated	
Echo Awards	2012	Lana Del Rey	Best International Newcomer	Nominated	
Echo Awards	2013	Lana Del Rey	Best International Female Artist Rock/Pop	Won	
Echo Awards	2013	Lana Del Rey	Best International Newcomer	Won	
Echo Awards	2015	Lana Del Rey	Best International Female Artist Rock/Pop	Nominated	
Elle Style Awards	2016	Lana Del Rey	Female Artist of the Year	Won	
Esme Chatwin Awards	2013	Lana Del Rey	Artist Marketing Campaign	Nominated	
Esme Chatwin Awards	2018	Lana Del Rey	Artist Marketing Campaign	Nominated	
FiFi Awards (United States)	2020	Gucci Guilty Campaign (with Gucci)	Media Campaign of the Year - Women's	Won	
FiFi Awards (Germany) (Note: Duftstars Awards are a German version of the FiFi Awards, both presented by The Fragrance Foundation)	2020	Gucci Guilty Campaign (with Gucci)	Print Subject	Won	
GAFFA Awards (Denmark)	2012	Lana Del Rey	International New Artist of the Year	Won	
GAFFA Awards (Denmark)	2012	Lana Del Rey	International Female Artist of the Year	Won	
GAFFA Awards (Denmark)	2012	Born to Die	International Album of the Year	Won	
GAFFA Awards (Denmark)	2018	Lana Del Rey	International Solo Artist of the Year	Nominated	
GAFFA Awards (Denmark)	2018	Lust for Life	International Album of the Year	Nominated	
GAFFA Awards (Denmark)	2020	Lana Del Rey	International Solo Artist of the Year	Nominated	
GAFFA Awards (Denmark)	2022	Lana Del Rey	International Solo Artist of the Year	Nominated	
GAFFA Awards (Denmark)	2022	Chemtrails over the Country Club	International Album of the Year	Nominated	
GAFFA Awards (Denmark)	2022	"Chemtrails over the Country Club"	International Hit of the Year	Nominated	
GAFFA Awards (Norway)	2012	Lana Del Rey	International New Artist of the Year	Won	
GAFFA Awards (Norway)	2012	Born to Die	International Album of the Year	Won	
GAFFA Awards (Sweden)	2012	Lana Del Rey	Best Foreign New Act	Won	
GAFFA Awards (Sweden)	2012	Lana Del Rey	Best Foreign Solo Act	Won	
GAFFA Awards (Sweden)	2015	Lana Del Rey	Best Foreign Solo Act	Won	
GAFFA Awards (Sweden)	2018	Lana Del Rey	Best Foreign Solo Act	Nominated	
GAFFA Awards (Sweden)	2018	Lust for Life	Best Foreign Album	Nominated	
GAFFA Awards (Sweden)	2018	"Lust for Life"	Best Foreign Song	Won	
GAFFA Awards (Sweden)	2024	Did You Know That There's a Tunnel Under Ocean Blvd	International Album of the Year	Won	
Goodreads Choice Awards	2020	Violet Bent Backwards over the Grass	Best Poetry	Nominated	
Golden Globe Awards	2015	"Big Eyes"	Best Original Song – Motion Picture	Nominated	
Golden Trailer Awards	2014	Maleficent: Once Upon a Dream	Best Fantasy Adventure	Won	
Golden Trailer Awards	2014	Maleficent: Once Upon a Dream	Best Fantasy/Adventure TV Spot	Nominated	
Golden Trailer Awards	2014	Maleficent: Once Upon a Dream	Best Music TV Spot	Nominated	
GQ Men of the Year Awards	2012	Lana Del Rey	Woman of the Year	Won	
Grammy Awards	2014	Paradise	Best Pop Vocal Album	Nominated	
Grammy Awards	2014	"Young and Beautiful"	Best Song Written for Visual Media	Nominated	
Grammy Awards	2016	Beauty Behind the Madness (as featured artist)	Album of the Year	Nominated	
Grammy Awards	2018	Lust for Life	Best Pop Vocal Album	Nominated	
Grammy Awards	2020	Norman Fucking Rockwell!	Album of the Year	Nominated	
Grammy Awards	2020	"Norman Fucking Rockwell"	Song of the Year	Nominated	
Grammy Awards	2024	Did You Know That There's a Tunnel Under Ocean Blvd	Album of the Year	Nominated	
Grammy Awards	2024	Did You Know That There's a Tunnel Under Ocean Blvd	Best Alternative Music Album	Nominated	
Grammy Awards	2024	"A&W"	Song of the Year	Nominated	
Grammy Awards	2024	"A&W"	Best Alternative Music Performance	Nominated	
Grammy Awards	2024	"Candy Necklace" (featuring Jon Batiste)	Best Pop Duo/Group Performance	Nominated	
Guild of Music Supervisors Awards	2020	"Don't Call Me Angel" (with Ariana Grande and Miley Cyrus)	Song Written and/or Recorded for a Film	Nominated	
Hit FM Music Awards	2023	"Snow on the Beach" (with Taylor Swift)	Top 10 Singles	Won	
Hollywood Music In Media Awards	2026	"First Light" (from 007 : First Light)	Best Song - Video Game	Won	
Hungarian Music Awards	2015	Ultraviolence	International Alternative Music Album of the Year	Nominated	
Hungarian Music Awards	2016	Honeymoon	International Modern Pop-Rock Album of the Year	Nominated	
Hungarian Music Awards	2020	Norman Fucking Rockwell!	International Alternative Music Album of the Year	Won	
IFPI Platinum Europe Awards	2012	Born to Die	Level 1	Won	
IFPI Platinum Europe Awards	2013	Born to Die	Level 2	Won	
iHeartRadio Music Awards	2014	"Summertime Sadness" (Cedric Gervais Remix)	EDM Song of the Year	Nominated	
iHeartRadio Music Awards	2020	"Doin' Time"	Alternative Rock Song of the Year	Nominated	
iHeartRadio Music Awards	2020	"Break Up with Your Girlfriend, I'm Bored"	Best Cover Song	Nominated	
Independent Music Awards	2012	"Video Games"	International Video of the Year	Nominated	
International Dance Music Awards	2013	"Blue Jeans"	Best Alternative/Indie Rock Dance Track	Nominated	
International Dance Music Awards	2013	Lana Del Rey	Best Break-Through Artist (Solo)	Nominated	
International Online Cinema Awards	2014	"Young And Beautiful"	Best Original Song	Won	
Ivor Novello Awards	2012	"Video Games"	Best Contemporary Song	Won	
Ivor Novello Awards	2024	Herself	Special International Award	Won	
MTV Europe Music Awards	2012	Herself	Best New Act	Nominated	
MTV Europe Music Awards	2012	Herself	Best Alternative	Won	
MTV Europe Music Awards	2012	Herself	Best Push Act	Nominated	
MTV Europe Music Awards	2014	Herself	Best Alternative	Nominated	
MTV Europe Music Awards	2015	Herself	Best Alternative	Won	
MTV Europe Music Awards	2017	Herself	Best Alternative	Nominated	
MTV Europe Music Awards	2019	Herself	Best Alternative	Nominated	
MTV Europe Music Awards	2023	Herself	Best Alternative	Won	
MTV Europe Music Awards	2024	Herself	Best Alternative	Nominated	
MTV Video Music Awards	2012	"Born to Die"	Best Art Direction	Nominated	
MTV Video Music Awards	2012	"Born to Die"	Best Cinematography	Nominated	
MTV Video Music Awards	2013	"National Anthem"	Best Art Direction	Nominated	
MTV Video Music Awards	2013	"Ride"	Best Cinematography	Nominated	
MTV Video Music Awards	2014	"West Coast"	Best Cinematography	Nominated	
MTV Video Music Awards	2020	"Doin' Time"	Best Alternative	Nominated	
MTV Video Music Awards	2023	"Candy Necklace" (featuring Jon Batiste)	Best Alternative	Won	
MTV Video Music Awards	2023	"Candy Necklace" (featuring Jon Batiste)	Best Art Direction	Nominated	
NME Awards	2012	Lana Del Rey	Best New Band	Nominated	
NME Awards	2012	"Video Games"	Best Track	Nominated	
NME Awards	2012	"Video Games"	Best Video	Nominated	
NME Awards	2015	Lana Del Rey	Best Solo Artist	Nominated	
NME Awards	2016	Lana Del Rey	Best International Solo Artist	Nominated	
NME Awards	2018	Lana Del Rey	Best International Solo Artist	Nominated	
NME Awards	2020	Lana Del Rey	Best Solo Act in the World	Nominated	
NME Awards	2020	Lana Del Rey	Best Festival Headliner	Nominated	
NME Awards	2020	Norman Fucking Rockwell!	Best Album in the World	Won	
NME Awards	2022	Blue Banisters	Best Album in the World	Nominated	
National Music Publishers' Association	2024	Lana Del Rey	Songwriter Icon Award	Honoree	
Official Charts Company	2012	Born to Die	Number One Album Award	Won	
Official Charts Company	2014	Ultraviolence	Number One Album Award	Won	
Official Charts Company	2017	Lust For Life	Number One Album Award	Won	
Official Charts Company	2019	Norman Fucking Rockwell!	Number One Album Award	Won	
Official Charts Company	2021	Chemtrails over the Country Club	Number One Album Award	Won	
Official Charts Company	2023	Did You Know That There's a Tunnel Under Ocean Blvd	Number One Album Award	Won	
People's Choice Awards	2016	Lana Del Rey	Favorite Female Artist	Nominated	
People's Choice Country Awards	2024	Take Me Home, Country Roads	The Cover Song of 2024		Nominated
PureCharts Awards (France)	2024	Did You Know That There's a Tunnel Under Ocean Blvd	International Album of the Year	Won	
Q Awards	2011	Lana Del Rey	Next Big Thing	Won	
Q Awards	2017	Lana Del Rey	Best Solo Artist	Nominated	
Q Awards	2019	"Video Games"	Song of the Decade	Won	
Q Awards	2019	Lana Del Rey	Best Act in the World Today	Nominated	
Q Awards	2019	Norman Fucking Rockwell!	Best Album	Nominated	
Robert Music Awards	2014	Lana Del Rey	Best Pop Artist	Won	
Robert Music Awards	2015	High by the Beach	Best Promo Video	Nominated	
Robert Music Awards	2019	Lana Del Rey	Best Female Artist	Won	
Robert Music Awards	2019	Lana Del Rey	Best Pop Artist	Nominated	
Robert Music Awards	2019	Norman Fucking Rockwell	Album of the Year	Runner-up	
Robert Music Awards	2019	The Greatest	Song of the Year	Nominated	
RTHK International Pop Poll Awards	2013	Lana Del Rey	Top New Act	Gold	
Satellite Awards	2014	"Young and Beautiful"	Best Original Song	Won	
Satellite Awards	2019	"Don't Call Me Angel"	Best Original Song	Nominated	
SESAC Pop Awards	2020	"Doin' Time"	Performance Award Winner	Won	
Swiss Music Awards	2013	Born to Die	Best Album Pop / Rock International	Nominated	
Swiss Music Awards	2013	Born to Die	Best Breaking Act International	Nominated	
The Daily Californian’s Arts Awards	2019	Lana Del Rey	Artist of the Year	Won	
The Daily Californian’s Arts Awards	2019	Norman Fucking Rockwell!	Album of the Year	Runner-up	
The Daily Californian’s Arts Awards	2022	"Snow on the Beach" (with Taylor Swift)	Best Collaboration	Runner-up	
The Daily Californian’s Arts Awards	2023	"Let The Light In" (with Father John Misty)	Best Collaboration	Won	
The Daily Californian’s Arts Awards	2023	Did You Know That There's a Tunnel Under Ocean Blvd	Best Alternative Album	Won	
The Uber Arena	2018	Lana Del Rey	First-Time Buddy Bear Award	Won	
UK Music Video Awards	2012	"Born to Die"	Best International Pop Video	Won	
UK Music Video Awards	2012	"Blue Jeans"	Best International Pop Video	Nominated	
UK Music Video Awards	2012	"National Anthem"	Best International Pop Video	Nominated	
UK Music Video Awards	2012	"Blue Jeans"	Best Cinematography	Nominated	
UK Music Video Awards	2012	"National Anthem"	Best Styling	Nominated	
Variety Hitmakers Awards	2021	Lana Del Rey	Decade Award	Won	
World Soundtrack Awards	2013	"Young and Beautiful"	Best Original Song Written for a Film	Nominated	
Xbox Entertainment Awards	2013	Born to Die	Best Album	Won	
YouTube Creator Awards	2011	Lana Del Rey	Silver Creator Award	Won	
YouTube Creator Awards	2012	Lana Del Rey	Gold Creator Award	Won	
YouTube Creator Awards	2020	Lana Del Rey	Diamond Creator Award	Won	
Žebřík Music Awards	2011	Lana Del Rey	Best International Discovery	Nominated	

== Other accolades ==
=== Streaming Milestones ===
Name of the achievement, year presented, category, work(s), and the result
Achievement	Year	Category	Work(s)	Result	Ref.
Pandora Streaming Billionaires Milestone Program (Note: Pandora's Streaming Billionaires Milestone Program is a program that recognizes artists who have reached one billion streams on Pandora. Lana was awarded with the "Alternative Billionaire" program.)	2021	Alternative Billionaire	Herself	Won	
Spotify Plaques (Note: The Spotify Billions Club Plaque (or Spotify Plaque) is an award that Spotify gives to artists with songs with over one billion streams. It is a large black plaque with a shiny silver plate containing the Spotify logo, the artist's name, and the song title.)	2023	Billions Club (1,000,000,000 Streams)	"Summertime Sadness"	Won	
Spotify Plaques	2023	Billions Club (1,000,000,000 Streams)	"Young and Beautiful"	Won	
Spotify Plaques	2024	Billions Club (1,000,000,000 Streams)	"Video Games"	Won	
Spotify Plaques	2024	Billions Club (1,000,000,000 Streams)	"Stargirl Interlude" (with the Weeknd)	Won	
Spotify Plaques	2025	Billions Club (1,000,000,000 Streams)	"West Coast"	Won	

=== Vevo-Certified Videos ===
Year	Nominee/Work	Awarded Videos	Ref.
2025	Lana Del Rey	15	
As of May 5, 2025
