= Fuck It I Love You =

2019 single by Lana Del Rey

Promotional single by Lana Del Rey

from the album Norman Fucking Rockwell!
- B-side: "The Greatest"
- Released: August 22, 2019
- Recorded: 2019: Electric Lady Studios (New York, NY); Conway Recording Studios (Los Angeles, CA)
- Genre: Rock; surf pop
- Length: 3:38
- Label: Interscope; Polydor
- Songwriters: Lana Del Rey; Jack Antonoff
- Producers: Del Rey; Antonoff

Lana Del Rey promotional singles chronology
"Looking for America" (2019)	"Fuck It I Love You" (2019)	"LA Who Am I to Love You" (2020)

Music video
- "Fuck It I Love You" on YouTube

"Fuck It I Love You" is a song by American singer and songwriter Lana Del Rey. It was released as the first promotional single from her album, Norman Fucking Rockwell!, along with "The Greatest". On August 22, 2019, Del Rey released a "double feature" music video for both songs. Later that day, she released the two as a joint-single on digital outlets.

== Writing and composition ==
A rock and surf pop ballad, it was written and produced by Del Rey and Jack Antonoff, whilst the version featured on the single release, as well as in the music video and digital editions of the album, has a different beat arrangement and production by Andrew Watt, and Louis Bell. The drums on the song were performed by Chad Smith of the Red Hot Chili Peppers. The lyrics reference the song, "Dream a Little Dream of Me". Lyrically, the song features Del Rey singing about questioning her lifestyle while missing her loved one.

== Music video ==
The double feature music video starts off with Del Rey turning on a jukebox. She then performs "Fuck It I Love You" in front of a neon-gradient on a small stage in a dive bar, reminiscent of one of her most famous scenes in the video for "Ride" (2012). As she performs, the main cutaways show her painting a canvas on a boat with side braids (referencing the album's cover) before clips show her surfing in the sea with an aurora borealis in the sky. Throughout, numerous other clips play including one with an old-fashion television is shown playing clips of Del Rey and model Brad Swanick surfing in a classic 1960s film style, shots of Del Rey and her back-up dancers/singers Alex Kaye and Ashley Rodriguez (who also appear in the videos for "Mariners Apartment Complex" and "Lust for Life") as they skateboard down the street, and shots of a teary-eyed Del Rey sitting on the sand as she mouths the lyrics directly to the camera. The first half with "Fuck It I Love You" ends as Swanick and Del Rey fall off the surfboard and reveal the green screen as symbolic waves begin tumbling the camera down.

The video was directed by Rich Lee, who had previously directed the videos for "Love", "Lust for Life", and "White Mustang", among others. The video itself pays homage to "Ride" numerous times with its bar scene making parallels to it, as well as clips with Del Rey bending over a dock (reminiscent of scenes in "Ride" where she bends over a balcony) and shots of her swimming in a wire swing on the beach (like she had done in the desert in "Ride"). Standing over nine minutes in length, the video has also been considered to be a short film. While Del Rey has released visuals for "Mariners Apartment Complex" and "Venice Bitch" from the album, she has referenced the double-feature as her "first video from the album" numerous times.

== Critical reception ==
The song received critical acclaim upon its release. Mikael Wood of the Los Angeles Times praised the song's California sound, praising how "the characteristically dreamy new tune finds Del Rey further exploring the West Coast psychic space that has obsessed her for years; nobody in pop makes more effective use than she does of a century’s worth of accumulated Hollywood iconography." Al Newstead of TripleJ said the song "sounds like the closest thing to a traditional single we've had from the album yet, with a 'California dreamin' vibe and memorable hooks." Tosten Burks of Spin wrote that both "Fuck It I Love You" and "The Greatest" were "surf-ish rock ballads that reflect on California’s lost mystique." James Rettig of Stereogum further praised the California sound and called both songs "two more promising glimpses of Norman Fucking Rockwell".

== Charts ==
Chart (2019)	Peak position
Belgium (Ultratip Bubbling Under Flanders)	17
Canada Digital Song Sales (Billboard)	44
France (SNEP)	179
Ireland (IRMA)	59
Lithuania (AGATA)	63
New Zealand Hot Singles (RMNZ)	17
Portugal (AFP)	86
Slovakia Singles Digital (ČNS IFPI)	74
Sweden Heatseeker (Sverigetopplistan)	9
UK Singles (OCC)	59
US Bubbling Under Hot 100 (Billboard)	19
US Alternative Digital Song Sales (Billboard)	4
US Rolling Stone Top 100	96

== Certifications ==
Region	Certification	Certified units/sales
Australia (ARIA)	Gold	35,000^{‡}
Brazil (Pro-Música Brasil)	2× Platinum	80,000^{‡}
New Zealand (RMNZ)	Gold	15,000^{‡}
United Kingdom (BPI)	Silver	200,000^{‡}
United States (RIAA)	Gold	500,000^{‡}
^{‡} Sales+streaming figures based on certification alone.
