= Norman Fucking Rockwell! (disambiguation) =

Norman Fucking Rockwell! is a 2019 studio album by Lana Del Rey.

Norman Fucking Rockwell! may also refer to:

- "Norman Fucking Rockwell" (song), the album's title track
- Norman Fucking Rockwell (film), an accompanying short film

== See also ==
- NFR (disambiguation)
