= The Norman Fucking Rockwell! Tour =

2019 concert tour by Lana Del Rey

- Tour by Lana Del Rey
- Promotional poster for the tour
- Location: Asia; North America
- Associated album: Norman Fucking Rockwell!
- Start date: September 21, 2019
- End date: November 30, 2019
- Legs: 2
- No. of shows: 20
- Supporting acts: Andrew Thomas; Julia Jacklin; Haley; Lucy Dacus; Nikki Lane; Lissie; Robert Ellis

Lana Del Rey concert chronology
- LA to the Moon Tour (2018); The Norman Fucking Rockwell! Tour (2019); 2023 tour (2023)

The Norman Fucking Rockwell! Tour was the fifth headlining concert tour by American singer Lana Del Rey, in support of her sixth studio album, Norman Fucking Rockwell! (2019). The tour began at the Jones Beach Theater in Wantagh, New York, on September 21, 2019, and concluded at the Du Arena in Abu Dhabi, United Arab Emirates on November 30 of the same year.

The tour consisted of 19 shows in North America, and one in Asia. The tour was expected to continue in 2020, with a set of shows held Europe, Latin America and a few in North America, but the European leg of the tour was cancelled after Del Rey fell ill, while the rest of the shows were cancelled due to the COVID-19 pandemic.

== Background ==
On July 31, 2019, Del Rey announced that her sixth studio album Norman Fucking Rockwell! would be released on August 30. The following day, she announced that the album's release would be followed by a tour.

The stops for the first leg of the tour were primarily along the west coast of North America, with a few stops in major cities elsewhere in Canada and the United States. On September 16, 2019, Del Rey confirmed on radio 102.7KIISFM, that the tour would have four legs. The first leg would take place in the West Coast of North America during fall 2019, while the second leg would be in Europe during winter 2020. The third leg took place in the Midwest of North America in November 2019 with a final show in Abu Dhabi. The fourth leg, would consist of Southeastern U.S. states like Tennessee, Alabama, and Florida as well as festival shows in Europe and South America from March to June 2020, was eventually cancelled.

== Setlist ==
The following setlist is obtained from the Vancouver show on September 30, 2019. It is not intended to represent all dates.

1. "Norman Fucking Rockwell"
2. "Bartender"
3. "For Free"
4. "Mariners Apartment Complex"
5. "Born to Die"
6. "Blue Jeans"
7. "Cherry"
8. "White Mustang"
9. "Pretty When You Cry"
10. "Change" / "Black Beauty" / "Young and Beautiful"
11. "Ride"
12. "Video Games"
13. "Summertime Sadness"
14. "Doin’ Time"
15. "Off to the Races"
16. "Shades of Cool"
17. "Venice Bitch"

=== Notes ===
- Del Rey performed "Tomorrow Never Came" with Sean Ono Lennon during the shows in Wantagh and Los Angeles.
- Joan Baez performed "Diamonds & Rust" and "Don’t Think Twice, It’s All Right" with Del Rey for the Berkeley concert.
- During the shows in Wantagh, Berkeley, and Los Angeles, Adam Cohen joined Del Rey onstage to perform "Chelsea Hotel No. 2".
- During the show in Los Angeles, Del Rey performed "For Free" with Zella Day and Weyes Blood, "Wicked Game" with Chris Isaak, "Hope Is a Dangerous Thing for a Woman Like Me to Have – but I Have It" with Jack Antonoff, and "Daddy Issues" with Jesse Rutherford.

== Tour dates ==
Date (2019)	City	Country	Venue	Opening act
September 21	Wantagh (Note: Promoted as Jones Beach)	United States	Jones Beach Theater	—N/a
September 30	Vancouver	Canada	Rogers Arena	—N/a
October 2	Seattle	United States	WaMu Theater	—N/a
October 3	Portland	United States	Moda Center	—N/a
October 6	Berkeley	United States	Hearst Greek Theatre	—N/a
October 8	Sacramento	United States	Memorial Auditorium	—N/a
October 10	Los Angeles (Note: Promoted as Hollywood)	United States	Hollywood Bowl	—N/a
October 11	San Diego	United States	CalCoast Open Air Theatre	—N/a
November 3	Albuquerque	United States	Kiva Auditorium	Andrew Thomas
November 4	Denver	United States	Bellco Theatre	Julia Jacklin
November 6	Sioux Falls	United States	The District	Haley
November 8	Chicago	United States	Byline Bank Aragon Ballroom	Lucy Dacus
November 10	Des Moines	United States	Veterans Memorial Auditorium	—N/a
November 11	Madison	United States	The Sylvee	—N/a
November 13	Omaha	United States	Slosburg Hall	Nikki Lane
November 14	Kansas City	United States	Uptown Theater	Lissie
November 16	Wichita	United States	Cotillion Ballroom	—N/a
November 17	Oklahoma City	United States	The Criterion	Robert Ellis
November 19	Nashville	United States	Municipal Auditorium	Lissie
November 30	Abu Dhabi	United Arab Emirates	du Arena	—N/a

== Cancelled shows ==
Date (2020)	City	Country	Venue	Reason
February 21	Amsterdam	Netherlands	Ziggo Dome	Illness
February 23	Paris	France	Accor Arena	Illness
February 25	London	United Kingdom	The O_{2} Arena	Illness
February 26	Manchester	United Kingdom	Manchester Arena	Illness
February 28	Glasgow	United Kingdom	SSE Hydro	Illness
February 29	Birmingham	England	Resorts World Arena	Illness
March 2	Berlin	Germany	Mercedes-Benz Arena	Illness
March 3	Cologne	Germany	Lanxess Arena	Illness
March 27 (Note: This concert was supposed to be a part of Lollapalooza Chile.)	Santiago	Chile	O'Higgins Park	COVID-19 pandemic
March 29 (Note: This concert was supposed to be a part of Lollapalooza Argentina.)	San Isidro (Note: Promoted as Buenos Aires)	Argentina	Hipódromo de San Isidro	COVID-19 pandemic
March 31 (Note: This concert was supposed to be a part of Asunciónico.)	Asunción	Paraguay	Hipodromo de Asunción	COVID-19 pandemic
April 3 (Note: This concert was supposed to be a part of Lollapalooza Brazil)	São Paulo	Brazil	Autódromo José Carlos Pace	COVID-19 pandemic
April 12 (Note: This concert was supposed to be a part of Coachella.)	Indio	United States	Empire Polo Club	COVID-19 pandemic
April 19	Indio	United States	Empire Polo Club	COVID-19 pandemic
May 15 (Note: This concert was supposed to be a part of Hangout Music Festival.)	Gulf Shores	United States	101 East Beach Boulevard	COVID-19 pandemic
June 5 (Note: This concert was supposed to be a part of Primavera Sound.)	Barcelona	Spain	Parc del Fòrum	COVID-19 pandemic
June 7 (Note: This concert was supposed to be a part of We Love Green Festival.)	Paris	France	Bois de Vincennes	COVID-19 pandemic
June 9	Verona	Italy	Verona Arena	COVID-19 pandemic
June 12 (Note: This concert was supposed to be a part of NOS Primavera Sound.)	Porto	Portugal	Parque da Cidade	COVID-19 pandemic
June 14 (Note: This concert was supposed to be a part of Bonnaroo Music & Arts Festival.)	Manchester	United States	Great Stage Park	COVID-19 pandemic
June 27 (Note: This concert was supposed to be a part of Glastonbury Festival.)	Pilton	United Kingdom	Worthy Farm	COVID-19 pandemic
