= Norman Fucking Rockwell (film) =

2019 film by Chuck Grant, starring Lana Del Rey

- Poster for the film
- Directed by: Chuck Grant
- Written by: Lana Del Rey
- Based on: Norman Fucking Rockwell! by Lana Del Rey
- Produced by: Lana Del Rey; Chuck Grant
- Starring: Lana Del Rey; Ashley Rodriguez; Alexandria Kaye
- Cinematography: Chuck Grant; Lana Del Rey
- Edited by: Lana Del Rey
- Music by: Lana Del Rey
- Distributed by: Polydor Records; Interscope Records
- Release date: December 20, 2019
- Running time: 14 minutes
- Country: United States
- Language: English

Norman Fucking Rockwell is a 2019 American short music film directed by Chuck Grant, written by her sister, Lana Del Rey, who also stars alongside Ashley Rodriguez and Alexandria Kaye. The film is based on three songs from Del Rey's Norman Fucking Rockwell!, the album's title track, "Bartender", and "Happiness is a Butterfly". It was released on YouTube on December 20, 2019.

== Production and development ==
In 2018, Del Rey released videos for two songs, "Mariners Apartment Complex" and "Venice Bitch". Believed to be from her upcoming album, the clips were both directed by Del Rey's sister Chuck Grant and filmed solely on an iPhone in a vintage style, achieved through post-production filters. On January 10, 2019, Del Rey previewed a clip of a then-unreleased song titled "Happiness is a Butterfly" and a visual for the video. Del Rey later teased a music video for the title track from Norman Fucking Rockwell! by posting a snippet of it following the release of the album in August.

Going without a proper release for several months, Del Rey announced in October that she would be releasing a triple-feature for three songs from her album. After teasing the release for several days on social media, Del Rey released the 14-minute-long video on December 20, 2019. The music follows Del Rey's summer releases of "Doin' Time", "Don't Call Me Angel", and "Fuck It, I Love You"/"The Greatest".

== Synopsis ==
Set in Los Angeles, Del Rey sings along to her album's title song, "Norman Fucking Rockwell" while playing along at her piano. Del Rey then proceeds to walk outside, wearing black sunglasses that feature cinematic imagery and home movies. Intercut with shots of Del Rey shining on a hammock and singing in front of roses, the song ends with Del Rey singing in front of a pool of CGI jellyfish. Del Rey's friend, Emma Elizabeth Tillman, makes a brief cameo in a scene in which Del Rey and her dancers are meditating in a national park with Disney wildlife wandering around them.

In the next segment, set to the song "Bartender", Del Rey and her friends are roaming around in a truck through an abandoned parking lot, harassing two comedic cops. The only section in the film to feature non-music audio, the group laugh as they throw slurpees and donuts at the cops as they chase them around, all while fighter jets fly overhead and explosions are set off in the background.

Following a brief 30-second-long black and white time lapse of moving traffic, the final song, "Happiness is a Butterfly" begins. The video takes place on the side of a busy street in Los Angeles, with Del Rey and her same two friends from "Bartender" walking around the pavement, singing the lyrics while laying on a dock, and playing with butterflies in front of a chain mill fence. This section features CGI lightning and cartoon butterflies, as well as real ones.

=== References ===
Alongside her social commentary and political references in the "Bartender" section, Del Rey also references other videos from her NFR! era. "Bartender" features the video portion of the photo session during which the alternative album cover for Urban Outfitters was shot. The section also features an extended version of the footage originally used in "Venice Bitch". "Happiness is a Butterfly" was filmed the same day as "Mariners Apartment Complex" and features Del Rey and friends dressed in the same attire in the video, reusing several shots from the video as well. Angie Martoccio of Rolling Stone compared the singer's role as being that of a "woman of the canyon". The video also features Jack Nicholson's grandson, Duke, who also appears with Del Rey on the cover of the album artwork.

== Cast and crew ==
The film stars Del Rey alongside her backup singers/dancers Alexandria Kaye and Ashley Rodriguez. Several of Del Rey's friends make cameo appearances, including Emma Tillman, Duke Nicholson, Craig Stark, and her sister and the film's director, Chuck Grant. Del Rey edited the video herself on iMovie, with CGI effects and graphics being added in later.

== Critical reception ==
The film received positive reviews upon release, with Billboard calling it "epic." Being a follow-up to previous music films of hers such as Ride (2012) and Tropico (2013), critics noted how the video was more tame overall compared to her other pieces.

== Music ==
The film is set to three songs from Del Rey's 2019 album Norman Fucking Rockwell!: the title track, "Bartender", and "Happiness is a Butterfly".
