= Cinnamon Girl (Lana Del Rey song) =

2019 song by Lana Del Rey

Song by Lana Del Rey

from the album Norman Fucking Rockwell!
- Released: August 30, 2019
- Recorded: 2018
- Studio: Conway (Los Angeles)
- Genre: Trip hop
- Length: 5:00
- Label: Interscope; Polydor
- Songwriters: Lana Del Rey; Jack Antonoff
- Producers: Jack Antonoff; Lana Del Rey

Audio video
- "Cinnamon Girl" on YouTube

"Cinnamon Girl" is a song by American singer and songwriter Lana Del Rey from her sixth studio album, Norman Fucking Rockwell! (2019). The song was written and produced by Del Rey and Jack Antonoff.

== Background ==
Del Rey first previewed the song on her Instagram account on October 12, 2018, deleting her post with the sample later that same day. She shared a second snippet via Instagram on October 15, 2018, showcasing the chorus of the song. The song was initially believed to be titled "Cinnamon", which was also the original name for Del Rey's Born to Die song "Radio", which features the line "Now my life is sweet like cinnamon/Like a fucking dream I'm living in".

While promoting her record Lust for Life (2017), Del Rey stated in an interview with Pitchfork:

Well, they’re personal. [laughs] I had some people in my life that made me a worse person. I was not sure if I could step out of that box of familiarity, which was having a lot of people around me who had a lot of problems and feeling like that was home base. Because it's all I know. I spent my whole life reasoning with crazy people. I felt like everyone deserved a chance, but they don't. Sometimes you just have to step away without saying anything."

Following a fan posting that quote online, Del Rey commented on the post that "The quote [from Pitchfork] is a perfect quote to go along with cinnamon [sic]. Some people don't deserve a chance."

=== Lyrics and composition ===
"Cinnamon Girl" was written and produced by Del Rey and Jack Antonoff, while being mixed by Laura Sisk, mastered by Chris Gehringer with Will Quinnell and Jonathan Sher, while being recorded at Conway Recording Studios in Los Angeles, California. Lyrically, the song speaks of a toxic relationship in which Del Rey hints at a lover trying to become estranged from her while being a prescription pill addict ("You try to push me out/But I just find my way back in"). The outro of the song samples "Wild Heart" by the band of producer Jack Antonoff.

Musically, the song has been described by Shaad D'Souza of Fader as a "Born to Die style trip hop track". Several critics reviewing the record made connections between the song and Neil Young's 1969 song of the same name, citing Del Rey's use of the title as possibly an homage to him. Frequent critic aberrations include Del Rey's soft, almost shaky vocals on the song as well as the electronic beats used in the studio version of the song.

== Critical reception ==
Upon the release of Norman Fucking Rockwell, the song received acclaim from critics for the most part, with several calling it a "standout track" on the album. Raisa Burner of Time gave the song a positive review, praising the song for Del Rey's "angelic falsetto even as she describes emotional devastation". Kitty Power of The Guardian cited "Cinnamon Girl" as a standout track compared to the rest of the record, due to its production being different than the rest of the album: "[the record] exists in some timeless, catgut-strewn place where 3am bar pianos and washes of keyboards serve as the tear-stained mat under Del Rey’s glass slipper of a voice – until, that is, a song such as Cinnamon Girl suddenly unspools an unexpectedly long, lyrical instrumental coda, in an electronic-tinged echo of Young’s famous meandering." Radio.com called the song a "standout" and "fan favorite". Alexis Petridis of The Guardian praised the song's EDM influences, pointing out its instrumental differences to the majority of songs on the record which have more of a folk-rock and surf pop sound. Lindsay Zoldaz of The Ringer praised Del Rey's ability to find the good in the bad: "Amid all the chaos and hurricanes, though, there is a radical kind of tenderness now present in Del Rey's music, a preserved innocence that once seemed irrevocably lost. Even if it’s only temporary, she reminds us, love can build shelter from the storm."

=== Ann Powers controversy ===
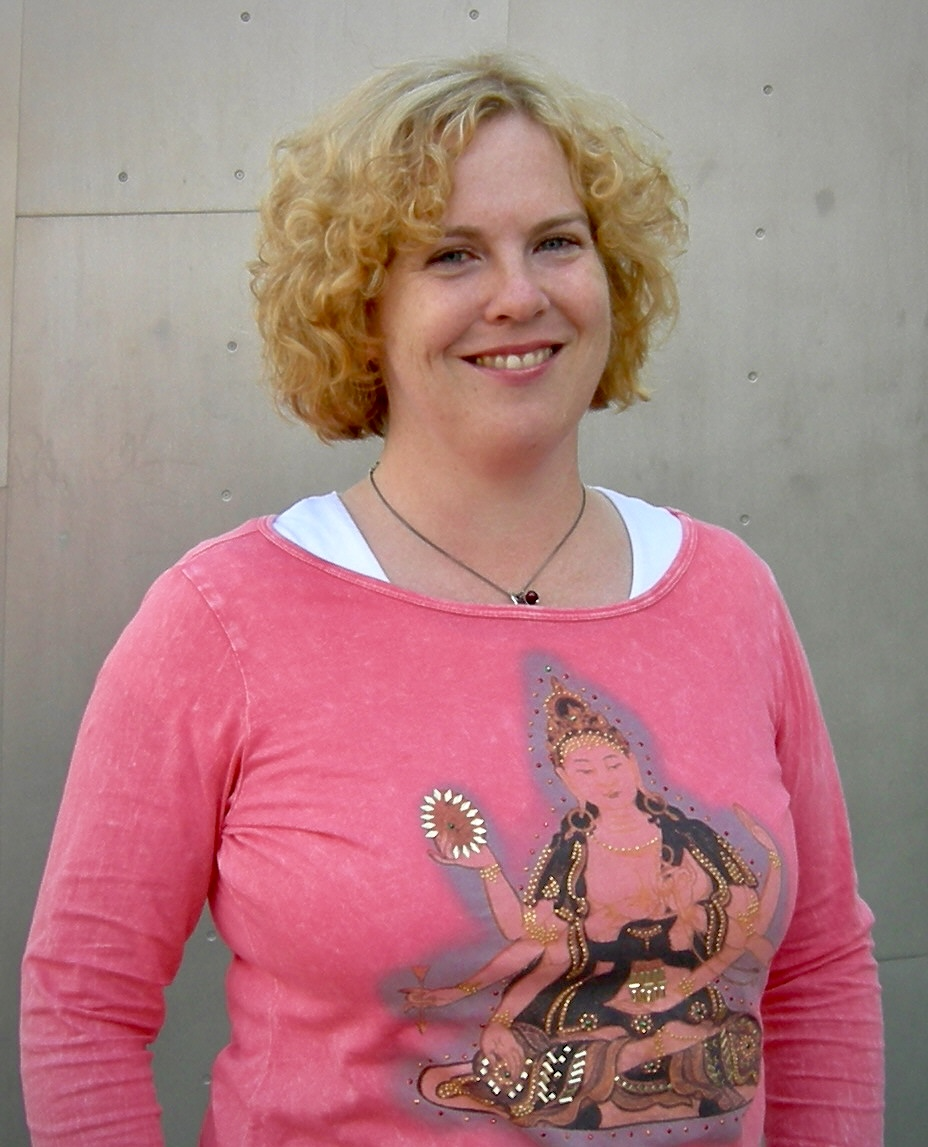
Music critic Ann Powers was called out by Del Rey for her criticism of her song, "Cinnamon Girl", in a review for NPR.

In her review of Norman Fucking Rockwell for NPR, famed critic Ann Powers gave the record a positive review, but was somewhat critical of "Cinnamon Girl", writing that:

The title's a mildly clever cop from a Neil Young classic, and the first line, "cinnamon in my teeth from your kiss," takes you somewhere. But then? There's a line about different colored pills, alluding to her sweetheart's addiction, and one about her frustration becoming like fire. B-plus poetics. There's some moaning about how no one has "held me without hurting me," and half-formed thoughts about words she cannot speak. Compare this vague non-story to four lines randomly pulled from Mitchell's 1972 song about her then-lover James Taylor's heroin habit, "Cold Blue Steel and Sweet Fire," written when she was five years younger than Del Rey is now: Concrete concentration camp / Bashing in veins for peace / Cold blue steel and sweet fire / Fall into Lady Release. Yet let Del Rey's song sink in, and it offers its own revelations—sensual and emotional, like Mitchell's, but less clearly mediated. The simplicity and directness of "Cinnamon Girl" hits as its leaden rhythm seems to grow more elastic... Sometimes all the song's effects fall away, only to push forward again; there doesn't seem to be much order to the dynamics. The whole effect is slippery, unattached to the process of telling a story. The song feels more like you're in a story, in someone's head at a particularly unsure moment. A great songwriter, as we tend to understand that role, would offer a more coherent view. But for Del Rey, the mash-up of effects and references is the point. It is emotion's actuality.

Del Rey took to Twitter to denounce the article, writing that "...I don't even relate to one observation you made about the music. There's nothing uncooked about me. To write about me is nothing like it is to be with me. Never had a persona. Never needed one. Never will", in one tweet and "So don't call yourself a fan like you did in the article and don't count your editor one either—I may never never have made bold political or cultural statements before- because my gift is the warmth I live my life with and the self reflection I share generously", in another one.

Following backlash from Del Rey's fans, Powers refused to change her opinion, stating that: "It is a critic's responsibility to be thoughtful and honest to herself in responding to artists' work, and an artist's prerogative to disagree with that response. I respect Lana Del Rey and hope that her music continues to receive the passionate appreciation it has received for years." Powers then took to Twitter to announce she would be taking a few days off of social media, encouraging people "I still think NFR is a deeply compelling, crucial album and hope everyone spends time listening to it (and goes back to Ultraviolence and Lust for Life too)..."

Shortly afterwards, Del Rey received criticism from music critics and fans of Powers alike. Jessica Hopper criticized Del Rey taking offense to Powers's critique of "Cinnamon Girl", citing Powers' coverage of female artists as what she believes to be what has allowed women to be taken more seriously in the music industry. The conflict became a top story on Twitter, with "Ann Powers" and "Cinnamon Girl" becoming trending topics nationwide in the US and several other territories.

== Credits and personnel ==
Credits adapted from the liner notes of Norman Fucking Rockwell!.

Personnel

- Lana Del Rey – vocals, songwriting, production
- Jack Antonoff – songwriting, production, engineering, mixing, programming, guitar, keyboards, piano
- Laura Sisk – engineering, mixing
- Jonathan Sher – assistant engineering
- Chris Gehringer – mastering
- Will Quinnell – assistant mastering

Technical

- Mastered at Sterling Sound
- Recorded at Conway Recording Studios, Los Angeles, United States

== Charts ==
Chart performance for "Cinnamon Girl"
Chart (2019)	Peak position
New Zealand Hot Singles (RMNZ)	14
US Alternative Digital Song Sales (Billboard)	18

Chart (2026)	Peak position
Global 200 (Billboard)	164
Greece International (IFPI)	64
Norway (IFPI Norge)	91
Switzerland (Schweizer Hitparade)	98

== Certifications ==
Certifications for "Cinnamon Girl"
Region	Certification	Certified units/sales
Australia (ARIA)	Platinum	70,000^{‡}
Austria (IFPI Austria)	Platinum	30,000^{‡}
Brazil (Pro-Música Brasil)	2× Platinum	80,000^{‡}
Denmark (IFPI Danmark)	Gold	45,000^{‡}
New Zealand (RMNZ)	Platinum	30,000^{‡}
Poland (ZPAV)	Platinum	50,000^{‡}
United Kingdom (BPI)	Platinum	600,000^{‡}
United States (RIAA)	Gold	500,000^{‡}
Streaming
Greece (IFPI Greece)	2× Platinum	4,000,000^{†}
^{‡} Sales+streaming figures based on certification alone.^{†} Streaming-only figures based on certification alone.
