= NFRS =

NFRS may refer to:

- National Fancy Rat Society, a UK club for rat fanciers
- Nepal Financial Reporting Standards, accounting regulations in Nepal
- Northeast Frontier Railway Stadium, a sports stadium in Assam, India

== Statutory fire and rescue services in England ==
- Norfolk Fire and Rescue Service
- Northamptonshire Fire and Rescue Service
- Northumberland Fire and Rescue Service
- Nottinghamshire Fire and Rescue Service

== See also ==
- NFR (disambiguation)
