= The Greatest (Lana Del Rey song) =

2019 single by Lana Del Rey

Single by Lana Del Rey

from the album Norman Fucking Rockwell!
- A-side: "Fuck It I Love You"
- Released: September 13, 2019
- Recorded: 2019
- Studio: Conway Recording Studios (Los Angeles, CA); Henson Recording Studios (Los Angeles, CA); House of Breaking Glass (Seattle, WA)
- Genre: Psychedelic rock
- Length: 5:00
- Label: Interscope; Polydor
- Songwriters: Lana Del Rey; Jack Antonoff
- Producers: Lana Del Rey; Jack Antonoff

Lana Del Rey singles chronology
| "Doin' Time" (2019) | "The Greatest" (2019) | "Don't Call Me Angel" (2019) |

Music video
- "The Greatest" on YouTube

"The Greatest" (stylized in sentence-case) is a song by American singer-songwriter Lana Del Rey, taken from her sixth studio album, Norman Fucking Rockwell! (2019). She wrote and produced it with Jack Antonoff. The song was released for digital download as a joint promotional single with "Fuck It I Love You" on August 22, 2019, by Interscope and Polydor Records. An accompanying "double feature" music video with the two was also released. Universal Music Group sent "The Greatest" to Italian radio on September 13, 2019, as the fifth single from the album.

== Writing and composition ==
The track was written and produced by Del Rey and Jack Antonoff. Lyrically, Del Rey sings about missing the "good old days" in her relationship and the world in general, but further expressing frustrations with how the world has changed: "The culture is lit, and if this is it‚ I had a ball/I guess that I'm burned out after all ... If this is it, I'm signing off". Del Rey makes numerous pop culture references including to the David Bowie song "Life on Mars", Instagram livestreams, The Beach Boys, the destructive effects of the 2018 California wildfires, and her infamous feud with rapper Kanye West due to his support of President Donald Trump.

== Music video ==
Placed in the second half of her "double feature" music video, the song plays after tumbling waves and a drone shot of Long Beach serve as prelude. Featuring the same bar sequence from the "Fuck It, I Love You" portion of the video, Del Rey continues to sing in front of a neon-gradient backdrop while new clips of her wandering the Long Beach harbor in a Venice "Locals Only" jacket. Reminiscent of shots from her video for "Ride", Del Rey plays darts and pool in the bar accompanied by older, biker-like men. Shots of a jukebox show a series of songs Del Rey has covered including "Doin' Time" by Sublime and "Chelsea Hotel #2" by Leonard Cohen, as well as "Life on Mars" by David Bowie, "Pacific Ocean Blue" by Dennis Wilson, "Kozmic Blues" by Janis Joplin and "Grace" by Jeff Buckley and "Bluebirds over the Mountain" by Ritchie Valens among others. Towards the end of the video, happy bar patrons are shown (one of them being Del Rey's brother Charlie). The video ends with a shot of Del Rey sitting on a boat "heading forward", similar to how she was in the cover art for the album.

The video was directed by Rich Lee, who had previously directed the videos for "Love", "Lust for Life", and "White Mustang", among others. Standing over nine minutes in length, the video has also been considered to be a short film. While Del Rey has released visuals for "Mariners Apartment Complex" and "Venice Bitch" from the album, she has referenced the double-feature as her "first video from the album" numerous times.

== Critical reception ==
Like its predecessors, "The Greatest" received universal critical acclaim upon its release, with numerous music critics calling it one of Del Rey's best songs. Claire Shaffer of Rolling Stone stated that the song features "Del Rey reflect[ing] on the state of pop... as well as the state of the world." Tosten Burks of Spin wrote that both "Fuck It, I Love You" and "The Greatest" were "surf-ish rock ballads that reflect on California's lost mystique." James Rettig of Stereogum further praised the California sound and called both songs "two more promising glimpses of Norman Fucking Rockwell." Writing for NME, Rhian Daly called the song "maybe one of the greatest songs she's ever written." Designating the song 'Best New Track', Pitchfork's Sam Sodomsky wrote:

"The Greatest" is a kaleidoscope of classic-rock radio transmitted through Lana's hushed, psychedelic lens. The drums roll in slow motion, the guitar solos are fuzzy, the piano is recorded so that you can feel the shag carpet beneath it. Instead of luxuriating in vintage textures, Lana is restless, eulogizing her listless youth while repeatedly incorporating the words "the culture is lit," as if attempting to dance through the tears. It's a playful, graceful way to voice a common feeling of helplessness and overstimulation. And if she sounds more at peace than the rest of us, it's because she's been here a while, waiting for us to catch up before it's too late.

=== Critics' lists ===
| Publication | List | Rank | Ref. |
|---|---|---|---|
| Pitchfork | The 200 Best Songs of the 2010s | 79 | |
| Pitchfork | The 100 Best Songs of 2019 | 2 | |
| GQ | 20 of Our Favorite Songs That Made 2019 | – | |
| The Ringer | The Best Songs of 2019 | 9 | |
| Vulture | The Best Songs of 2019 | 1 | |
| Billboard | 100 Best Songs of 2019: Staff List | 11 | |
| Rolling Stone | The 50 Best Songs of 2019 | 12 | |

== Charts ==
| Chart (2019) | Peak position |
|---|---|
| New Zealand Hot Singles (RMNZ) | 22 |
| US Alternative Digital Song Sales (Billboard) | 12 |

== Certifications ==
| Region | Certification | Certified units/sales |
|---|---|---|
| Brazil (Pro-Música Brasil) | Platinum | 40,000^{‡} |
^{‡} Sales+streaming figures based on certification alone.

== Release history ==
| Region | Date | Format | Label | Ref. |
|---|---|---|---|---|
| Various (Note: Release as a promotional single.) | August 22, 2019 | Digital download | Interscope; Polydor | |
| Italy | September 13, 2019 | Contemporary hit radio | Universal | |
