= Looking for America =

Looking for America may refer to:

- Looking for America (album), a 2003 album by American musician Carla Bley
- "Looking for America" (song), a 2019 song by American singer Lana Del Rey
- Looking for America Tour, a 2016 tour by American bands Switchfoot and Relient K
