= Hope Is a Dangerous Thing for a Woman Like Me to Have – but I Have It =

"Hope Is a Dangerous Thing for a Woman like Me to Have – but I Have It"

Single by Lana Del Rey

from the album Norman Fucking Rockwell!
- Released: January 9, 2019
- Recorded: 2018
- Studio: Rough Customer (Brooklyn); Sunset Banana Split (Los Angeles)
- Genre: Ambient
- Length: 5:24 (digital album and single version); 5:58 (physical album version)
- Label: Polydor
- Songwriters: Lana Del Rey; Jack Antonoff
- Producers: Jack Antonoff; Lana Del Rey

Lana Del Rey singles chronology
"Venice Bitch" (2018)	"Hope Is a Dangerous Thing for a Woman like Me to Have – but I Have It" (2019)	"Doin' Time" (2019)

Licensed audio
- "Hope Is a Dangerous Thing for a Woman Like Me to Have – but I Have It" on YouTube

"Hope Is a Dangerous Thing for a Woman like Me to Have – but I Have It" (stylized in all lowercase) is a song by American singer Lana Del Rey. The track was released as the third single on January 9, 2019, through Polydor Records, to promote her sixth studio album Norman Fucking Rockwell!. It followed the singles "Mariners Apartment Complex" and "Venice Bitch".

== Background ==
In early January 2019, Del Rey posted a preview of the song on Instagram and said in a statement that it was a "fan track". "Hope Is a Dangerous Thing for a Woman like Me to Have – but I Have It" was originally named "Sylvia Plath", in honor of the American poet whom she references in the song. In an interview with Vogue Korea, Del Rey revealed the song took three years to finish and considers it "the most personal song among all my tracks".

== Composition ==
"Hope Is a Dangerous Thing for a Woman like Me to Have – but I Have It" is an ambient ballad with a "muted, underwater-sounding piano" and an "elegiac melody". Producer Jack Antonoff said on Twitter that the track was recorded in his first recording session with Del Rey and that it was "recorded no click mostly live". He also commented its combination of "felt piano" and Del Rey's "perfect vocal" had "sounded exactly like that in the room".

In the song, Del Rey discusses religion, family, troubled romance, her struggle with alcoholism, her "journey to sobriety", and her refusal of fame and complex relationship with the limelight. The song also contains references to Sylvia Plath, after whom the song was originally named.

== Critical reception ==
The song received widespread critical acclaim. Writing for Rolling Stone, Ryan Reed called the track "mournful" and a meditation on "religion, family, alienation and the myths that surround celebrity". Nick Reilly of NME said the song features Del Rey "delivering one of her most confessional offerings to date as she compares herself to troubled poetry icon Sylvia Plath". Trace William Cowen of Complex called it "delightfully minimalist". Winston Cook-Wilson of Spin found the track to be "exceptionally crafted" with "standout lyrics". Ahead of the release of the song's album, Billboard named it the best song recorded by Del Rey, describing the lyrics of the chorus as the "most vulnerable moment in Lana Del Rey’s discography, and the most truthful".

The lyric "Shaking my ass is the only thing that's got this black narcissist off my back" caused online controversy, with users claiming that it was related to the singer's feuds with rappers Kanye West and Azealia Banks and accused her of being racist. Conversely, fans of Del Rey commented that she could be referencing the 1947 film Black Narcissus or "escaping a personification of death" in the song.

== Live debut ==
"Hope Is a Dangerous Thing for a Woman like Me to Have – but I Have It" premiered live at the Hollywood Bowl, Los Angeles, California, on Thursday, October 10, 2019, in a performance by Del Rey and Jack Antonoff, with the dancer Alexandria Kaye interpreting the music in the light and shadows of the upstage LCD screen.

== Credits and personnel ==
- Lana Del Rey – vocals, songwriting, production
- Jack Antonoff – production, songwriting, recording engineering, mixing, piano
- Laura Sisk – recording engineering, mixing
- Chris Gehringer – mastering
- Will Quinnell – assistant mastering engineering

== Charts ==
Chart performance for "Hope Is a Dangerous Thing for a Woman like Me to Have – but I Have It"
Chart (2019)	Peak position
Belgium (Ultratip Bubbling Under Flanders)	31
Belgium (Ultratip Bubbling Under Wallonia)	24
Canadian Digital Songs (Billboard)	45
France (SNEP)	68
Hungary (Single Top 40)	40
Ireland (IRMA)	80
Lithuania (AGATA)	50
New Zealand Hot Singles (RMNZ)	11
Scotland Singles (OCC)	77
Slovakia Singles Digital (ČNS IFPI)	70
Sweden Heatseeker (Sverigetopplistan)	1
UK Singles (OCC)	99
US Alternative Digital Songs (Billboard)	8
US Pop Digital Song Sales (Billboard)	20

== Certifications ==
Certifications for "Hope Is a Dangerous Thing for a Woman like Me to Have – but I Have It"
Region	Certification	Certified units/sales
Australia (ARIA)	Gold	35,000^{‡}
Brazil (Pro-Música Brasil)	Platinum	40,000^{‡}
^{‡} Sales+streaming figures based on certification alone.
