= Etihad Live =

Music venue

Coordinates: 24.4815°N 54.6062°E

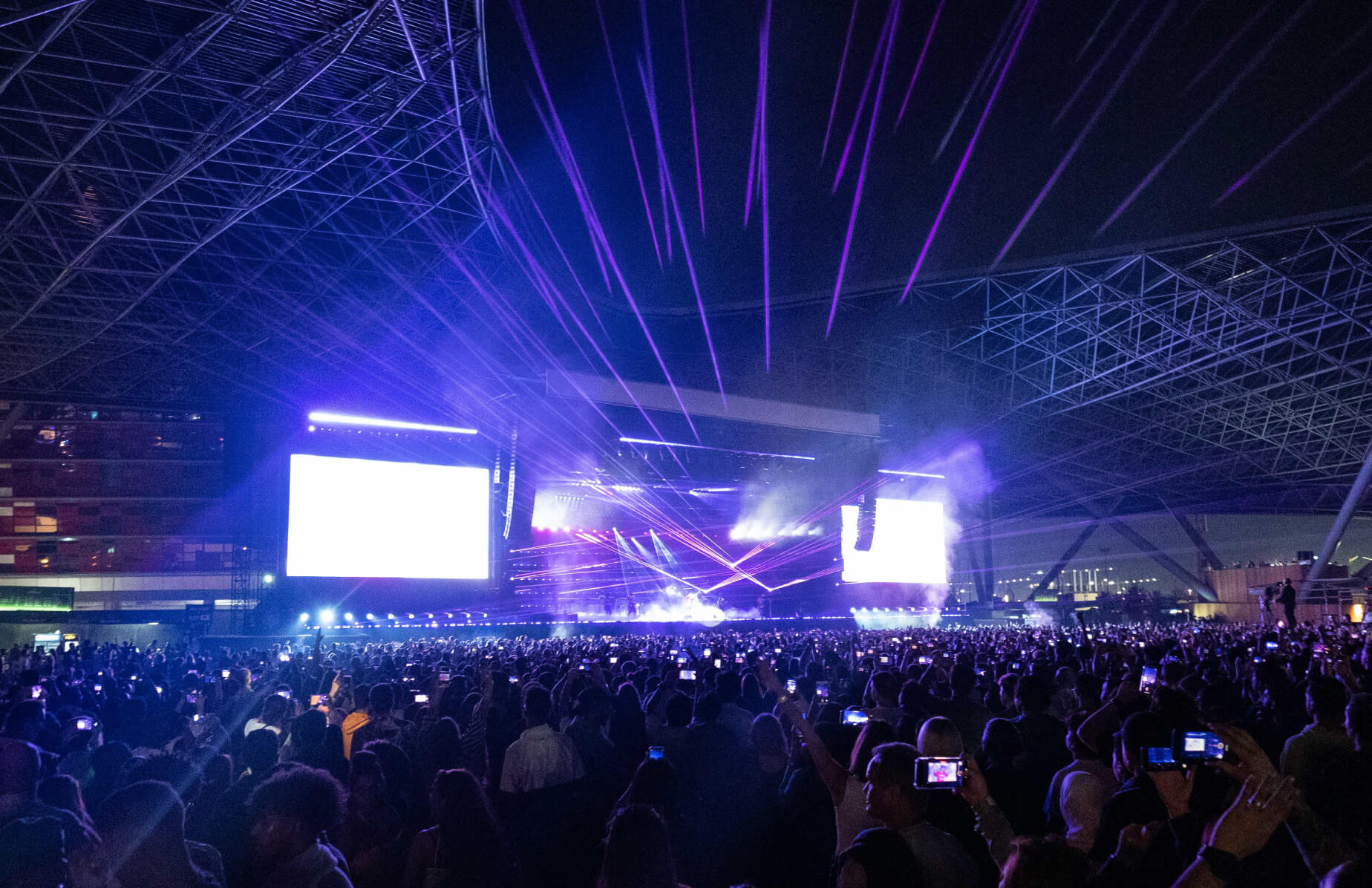
- Interactive map of Etihad Live
- Former names: Du Arena (2009–2021); Etihad Park (2021–2026)
- Address: Yas Leisure Drive - Yas Island - Abu Dhabi, United Arab Emirates; Abu Dhabi; United Arab Emirates
- Owner: Ethara
- Seating type: Amphitheater
- Capacity: 40,000

Construction
- Opened: 2009

Etihad Live is an outdoor music venue and amphitheater in Yas Island, Abu Dhabi, United Arab Emirates. The region's largest outdoor venue, it has a seating capacity of up 25,000 to 40,000 audience members at a time. It is a part of the Ferrari World Abu Dhabi complex. The venue welcomes many artists each year for annual Abu Dhabi Grand Prix post-race concerts. Festivals including Creamfields Abu Dhabi, KCON, and Ultra Music Festival have also been hosted, and in 2023 the venue hosted the first Wireless Festival in the Middle East. Madonna, Lana Del Rey, Guns N' Roses, Metallica, Coldplay, Katy Perry, Usher and Blackpink are among the artists who have performed there.

Originally called the Du Arena until 2021, and then Etihad Park until 2026, it was renamed to Etihad Live, as a stadium also sponsored by Etihad Airways, called the Etihad Park was being built in New York City.

== Concerts ==
List of concerts held at the Etihad Park
Date	Artist	Tour
October 29, 2009 (Note: Part of Abu Dhabi Grand Prix.)	Beyoncé	I Am... World Tour
October 30, 2009	Jamiroquai	—N/a
October 31, 2009	Kings of Leon	—N/a
November 1, 2009	Aerosmith	2009 Tour
November 12, 2010	Kanye West	—N/a
November 13, 2010	Linkin Park	A Thousand Suns World Tour
November 14, 2010	Prince	Prince 20Ten
November 24, 2010	Sarah McLachlan	—N/a
November 26, 2010	Nelly Furtado	Mi Plan Tour
December 16, 2010	Guns N' Roses	Chinese Democracy Tour
February 11, 2011	Eric Clapton	—N/a
March 11, 2011	Thirty Seconds to Mars	Into the Wild Tour
March 18, 2011	Stevie Wonder	—N/a
April 29, 2011	Shakira	The Sun Comes Out World Tour
October 13, 2011	Janet Jackson	Number Ones, Up Close and Personal
October 25, 2011	Metallica; Nervecell	2011 Vacation Tour
November 11, 2011	Britney Spears	Femme Fatale Tour
November 12, 2011	Incubus; The Cult	If Not Now, When? Tour
November 13, 2011	Paul McCartney	On the Run Tour
December 16, 2011	Sade	Sade Live
March 2, 2012	David Guetta	—N/a
March 29, 2012	Elton John	Greatest Hits Tour
June 3, 2012	Madonna	The MDNA Tour
June 4, 2012	Madonna	The MDNA Tour
November 2, 2012	Kylie Minogue	—N/a
November 3, 2012	Nickelback	Here and Now Tour
November 4, 2012	Eminem	—N/a
November 30, 2012	The Jacksons	Unity Tour
January 31, 2013	Kanye West	—N/a
March 14, 2013	Sting	Back to Bass Tour
March 22, 2013	Andrea Bocelli	—N/a
March 28, 2013	Guns N' Roses	Appetite for Democracy Tour
April 19, 2013	Metallica	2013 Summer Tour
October 19, 2013	Rihanna; GTA	Diamonds World Tour
October 31, 2013	Amr Diab; Elissa; Hussain Al Jassmi	—N/a
November 1, 2013	Jay-Z	Magna Carter World Tour
November 2, 2013	Muse	The 2nd Law World Tour
November 3, 2013	Depeche Mode	The Delta Machine Tour
February 21, 2014	The Rolling Stones	14 On Fire
April 25, 2014	Macklemore & Ryan Lewis	—N/a
May 23, 2014	Justin Timberlake	The 20/20 Experience World Tour
May 29, 2014	Black Sabbath	13 Tour
November 20, 2014	Tamer Hosny; Carole Samaha; Fayez Al Saeed; Mohammed Assaf	—N/a
November 21, 2014	Armin van Buuren	—N/a
November 22, 2014	Pharrell Williams	—N/a
November 23, 2014	The Who; The Wanton Bishops	The Who Hits 50!
April 25, 2015	Robbie Williams	Let Me Entertain You Tour
October 1, 2015	Bon Jovi	Bon Jovi Live! Tour
October 8, 2015	Dave Matthews Band	Fall International 2015 Tour
November 20, 2015	Mötley Crüe	Mötley Crüe Final Tour
November 26, 2015	Cheb Khaled; Fares Karam; Aryam	—N/a
November 27, 2015	Enrique Iglesias	Sex and Love Tour
November 28, 2015	Florence and the Machine	How Big, How Blue, How Beautiful Tour
November 29, 2015	Blur; Barns Courtney	The Magical Whip Tour
November 24, 2016	Pitbull	—N/a
November 25, 2016	The Chemical Brothers	—N/a
November 26, 2016	Lionel Richie	—N/a
November 27, 2016	Rihanna	Anti World Tour
December 31, 2016	Coldplay	A Head Full of Dreams Tour
March 2, 2017	Rod Stewart	Rod Stewart: The Hits Tour
November 9, 2017	Tony Hadley	—N/a
November 23, 2017	Calvin Harris	—N/a
November 24, 2017	J. Cole	4 Your Eyez Only World Tour
November 25, 2017	Mumford & Sons	Wilder Mind Tour
November 26, 2017	P!nk	—N/a
December 31, 2017	Katy Perry	Witness: The Tour
November 22, 2018	Post Malone	Beerbongs & Bentleys Tour
November 23, 2018	The Weeknd	The Weeknd Asia Tour
November 24, 2018	Sam Smith	The Thrill of It All Tour
November 25, 2018	Guns N' Roses	Not in This Lifetime... Tour
April 5, 2019	Migos	—N/a
April 26, 2019	Andrea Bocelli	—N/a
September 4, 2019	Red Hot Chili Peppers	—N/a
October 25, 2019	Eminem	Rapture 2019 / Kamikaze Tour
November 28, 2019	Marshmello	—N/a
November 29, 2019	Future; Gucci Mane	—N/a
November 30, 2019	Lana Del Rey	The Norman Fucking Rockwell! Tour
December 1, 2019	The Killers	—N/a
December 31, 2019	Bruno Mars	—N/a
December 9, 2021	Khalid	—N/a
December 10, 2021	Stormzy	—N/a
December 11, 2021	Lewis Capaldi	—N/a
December 12, 2021	Martin Garrix; DJ Snake	—N/a
November 17, 2022	Dave; Usher	—N/a
November 18, 2022	Swedish House Mafia	—N/a
November 19, 2022	Kendrick Lamar	The Big Steppers Tour
November 20, 2022	Def Leppard	—N/a
November 24, 2022	Andrea Bocelli	—N/a
December 3, 2022	Post Malone	—N/a
January 28, 2023	Blackpink	Born Pink World Tour
March 11, 2023 (Note: Part of Wireless Festival Middle East.)	Travis Scott; Lil Uzi Vert (cancelled); Central Cee; Roddy Ricch; M.I.A.	—N/a
November 23, 2023	Ava Max; Tiësto	—N/a
November 24, 2023	Chris Brown	—N/a
November 25, 2023	Shania Twain	Queen of Me Tour
November 26, 2023	Foo Fighters	—N/a
November 23, 2024	Playboi Carti (cancelled) 21 Savage; Ken Carson; Destroy Lonely; Homixide Gang; Yeat; A Boogie Wit da Hoodie; Fridayy; Saweetie; Lancey Foux	—N/a
April 26, 2025 (Note: This concert was part of the Offlimits Festival.)	Ed Sheeran	+–=÷× Tour
November 15, 2025	Travis Scott	Circus Maximus Tour
December 4, 2025	Benson Boone	
December 5, 2025	Elyanna; Post Malone	
December 6, 2025	Metallica	M72 World Tour
December 7, 2025	Katy Perry	The Lifetimes Tour
November 21, 2026	Shakira	Las Mujeres Ya No Lloran World Tour
November 21, 2026	Jonas Brothers	Jonas20: Greetings from Your Hometown Tour
