= Looking for America (song) =

Promotional single by Lana Del Rey
- Released: August 9, 2019
- Recorded: August 5, 2019
- Genre: Acoustic
- Length: 2:42
- Label: Polydor; Interscope
- Songwriters: Lana Del Rey; Jack Antonoff
- Producers: Del Rey; Antonoff

Lana Del Rey promotional singles chronology
"Season of the Witch" (2019)	"Looking for America" (2019)	"Fuck It I Love You" (2019)

Official audio
- "Looking for America" on YouTube

"Looking for America" is a song by American singer-songwriter Lana Del Rey. The song was written and produced by Del Rey and Jack Antonoff. The song was written as a response to the back-to-back shootings in Dayton and El Paso on August 3, 2019. The song was previewed on Instagram on August 5, the day it was written. After gaining positive feedback and popularity online, the song was officially released onto streaming platforms as a digital single on August 9.

== Background and development ==
On August 5, 2019, Del Rey released a video of her singing a new song she had written in the studio that day with producer Jack Antonoff on guitar and engineer Laura Sisk. The track was written following the back-to-back El Paso and Dayton mass shootings. Del Rey commented on the song's meaning, stating "Now I know I'm not a politician and I'm not trying to be so excuse me for having an opinion—but [I wrote the song] in light of all of the mass shootings and the back to back shootings in the last couple of days which really affected me on a cellular level." The video quickly attained popularity, gaining over a million views within a few days. She was inspired while visiting the Central Valley of California, while mentioning the City of Fresno, California, and many others.

== Release ==
Del Rey subsequently released the song internationally on August 9 as a single, the same day her cover for "Season of the Witch" was released. The single is a standalone release and is not included on Del Rey's album, Norman Fucking Rockwell. An accompanying audio video was posted onto Del Rey's YouTube and Vevo channel on August 9. Del Rey announced the day of the release that she would use all of her proceeds from the song to support the Gilroy Garlic Festival Victims Relief fund, El Paso Community Relief Fund and Dayton Foundation.

== Critical reception ==
Anna Gaca of Pitchfork was positive in her review, comparing the song to Del Rey's other politically charged single, "Coachella – Woodstock in My Mind", adding, "This nostalgic Americana doesn't just go back to Woodstock—it predates the Kennedy assassination. Now each of us who visit a public space live in fear, and in fear begin to curtail our own freedoms." Carlos De Loera of the Los Angeles Times further supported the comparison to "Coachella" and added that "The song's poignant lyrics reflect Del Rey's longing for a better, less fearful vision of her country."

Bradley Stern of MuuMuse praised the song, commenting "Beyond just being a beautiful, classically wistful, hauntingly sung Lana song about less worrisome days gone by while longing for a more peaceful future." Donna Balance of California Rocker added that "the lyrics to the new song don't play around and in her own delicate fashion, Del Rey makes some strong statements about [the] reality that Americans still face, despite repeated mass attacks and demands for more stringent gun laws." Trey Alson of MTV referred to the track as "timeless" in his coverage of the release, further adding how Del Rey "sings somberly about a country in need of improvements to its gun control."

The New York Times included the song its weekly "songs of the week" playlist. Time magazine also included the song in a best songs of the week article.

== Charts ==
Chart (2019)	Peak position
France Downloads (SNEP)	90
Scotland Singles (OCC)	52
UK Singles Downloads (OCC)	62
US Alternative Digital Songs (Billboard)	6
US Pop Digital Songs (Billboard)	22

== Release history ==
Country	Date	Format	Label	Ref.
Various	August 5, 2019	Streaming	Self-released	
Various	August 9, 2019	Digital download	Polydor; Interscope	
