= NFR =

NFR may refer to:

== Organizations and programs ==
- National Film Registry, US
- National Firefighter Registry for Cancer
- New Republican Force, Bolivian political party
- NFR Norges forskningsråd, The Research Council of Norway, RCN in English

== Science and engineering ==
- Network flight recorder, a software intrusion detection system
- Nociceptive flexion reflex, a muscle withdrawal reflex
- Non-filterable residue, equivalent to total suspended solids
- Non-functional requirement
- "Not for resuscitation", alternative wording to "Do not resuscitate" in medical records

== Others ==
- Not For Resale, a form of software product license
- Norman Fucking Rockwell, a Lana Del Rey album, a.k.a. NFR!, 2019
- National Finals Rodeo, US
- nfr or nefer, an ancient Egyptian hieroglyph
- Non-financial risk
- NFR (Northeast Frontier Railway zone), one of the 17 railway zones in India
