= LA Who Am I to Love You =

2020 poem by Lana Del Rey

"LA Who Am I to Love You" is a poem by American singer-songwriter Lana Del Rey from her first poetry collection, Violet Bent Backwards over the Grass (2020). The poem was recorded by Del Rey for her spoken word album of the same name with musical accompaniment by Jack Antonoff. The poem was released onto digital outlets on July 27, 2020, the day before the album's release, making it the only poem from the album available digitally.

== Background ==
Announced in 2018, Del Rey teased her poetry collection several times before announcing its August release in May 2020. Upon the announcement, the publisher, Simon & Schuster, issued a publicity release that announced several new poems, including "LA Who Am I to Love You". A day prior to the release of the record, Del Rey released the poem version as a promotional tease.

Like the rest of the album, the poem was written by Del Rey and produced by Antonoff. Proceeds from the album are intended to benefit Native American-focused charities and organizations.

== Synopsis ==
Told from first person, the poem follows the narrator on a nostalgic, emotional recollection of her life. Humanizing the city of Los Angeles as a person, Del Rey pleads to "LA" if she can be someone of significance to them. The poem's main themes include remorse, guilt, fame, turbulent childhood, and deception.
