= Venice Bitch =

Single by Lana Del Rey

from the album Norman Fucking Rockwell!
- Released: September 18, 2018
- Recorded: 2018
- Studio: Conway (Los Angeles); Westlake (Los Angeles); Henson (Los Angeles)
- Genre: Psychedelic rock; folk rock; psychedelic pop; soft rock
- Length: 9:36
- Label: Polydor; Interscope
- Songwriters: Lana Del Rey; Jack Antonoff
- Producers: Jack Antonoff; Lana Del Rey

Lana Del Rey singles chronology
"Mariners Apartment Complex" (2018)	"Venice Bitch" (2018)	"Hope Is a Dangerous Thing for a Woman Like Me to Have – but I Have It" (2019)

Music video
- "Venice Bitch" on YouTube

"Venice Bitch" is a song by American singer and songwriter Lana Del Rey. It was released on September 18, 2018, through Polydor and Interscope Records, as the second single from her sixth studio album, Norman Fucking Rockwell! (2019). The song was written and produced by Del Rey and Jack Antonoff. The song was met with unanimous praise from music critics and was ranked by numerous publications amongst the best songs of the year and decade. The song title references Venice, Los Angeles.

== Release ==
On September 12, 2018, The Fader announced that "Venice Bitch" would be released on September 18 as the second single from Del Rey's forthcoming studio album, following the first single, "Mariners Apartment Complex", released a week earlier. On September 17, Del Rey shared a preview of the track accompanied by a vintage-inspired visual on Instagram, and announced that the song would be premiered on Zane Lowe's Beats 1 show.

== Composition ==
"Venice Bitch" is a folk rock, psychedelic pop, psychedelic rock and soft rock song which runs at nine minutes and thirty-six seconds long, making it Del Rey's longest track to date. Rolling Stone said the song "starts as an tender ballad, with Del Rey unspooling her unique mix of young love and contemporary Americana over an acoustic guitar and subtle strings: "Ice cream, ice queen / I dream in jeans and leather / Life's dream, I'm sweet for you / Oh God, I miss you on my lips / It's me, your little Venice bitch." Halfway through, though, "Venice Bitch" transforms into an airy psych-pop jam that coasts to a cerebral, polychrome end.

Time noted that "the track has plenty of surprises in store, from distortion interludes to muted synth lines of varying insistence to eerie electric guitar plucks." Stereogum compared the lyrics to those on Born to Die, but with a "far less pop-oriented" production than that of her previous work. Greil Marcus made comparisons to various songs from the 1960s, including the Beach Boys' "Surfer Girl" and "In My Room", Randy Newman's "Lucinda", and Tommy James and the Shondells' "Crimson and Clover".

The lyrics feature the line "Nothing gold can stay" which is the title of a poem by Robert Frost.

An early demo version of "Venice Bitch" was utilized on "Taco Truck x VB", the final track of Del Rey's 2023 album, Did You Know That There's a Tunnel Under Ocean Blvd. This version was described as "the grimy, heavy, original and unheard version" of the song by the singer in a profile in Rolling Stone UK prior to release.

== Critical reception ==
"Venice Bitch" received universal acclaim from music critics upon its release. Pitchfork featured the song as their "Best New Track", with critic Sam Sodomsky calling it one of Del Rey's most gripping songs and unlike anything she had written before, and that Del Rey "has never allowed herself to sink so completely into an atmosphere, burrowing deep into the song's dark blue, moody grooves." Similarly, Under the Radar named it the best song of the week with Christopher Roberts calling it Del Rey's most interesting song and that "there was no denying its hypnotic quality." Stereogum also featured the track in their "5 Best Songs of the Week" article, writing, "It doesn't matter how experimental and weird and straight-up long this song gets, she's going to make it stick."

In his "Real Life Rock Top Ten" monthly column for Rolling Stone, Greil Marcus opined that the song "might be the most expansive California beach record ever made, and not just for its length," continuing: "It opens like a love letter, prosaic, direct; then a little more than two minutes in it begins to swirl, and you could be listening to an affair that began years ago or has yet to start. As the song goes on it turns into a series of reveries, suspended by the gorgeously sustained sound of liquid guitar feedback: it's the feeling of a series of clouds passing. Turn your head, look up again, and the last one you saw, the one that looked like a face, is already gone." In Rolling Stone's official review, Will Hermes said the song "is a woozily epic love song invoking Norman Rockwell, fading summers, getting high, and 'Crimson and Clover.'" He concluded that "it's the most experimental music she's ever made, and finally fades out after nine and a half minutes. And still it feels too short."

Noisey's Lauren O'Neill praised the song as "a shining encapsulation of who [Del Rey] is", further stating that the track "feels like a complete distillation of everything we've come to love about Del Rey. Its lyrics are firmly rooted in the American imagery she's beloved for ("I dream in jeans and leather"), and the song's hook — "Oh God, miss you on my lips / It's me, your little Venice Bitch" — seems nostalgic somehow, like she's not the sweet girl in the swimsuit anymore, but certainly was once. The feels like an encapsulation of all of the romance we associate with her, and has a distinct sense of the passage of time, capturing her where she is now."

=== Year-end lists ===
Publication	Rank	Ref.
Crack Magazine	2	
Dazed	8	
Esquire	—N/a	
Hot Press	16	
Noisey	4	
Paper	3	
Pitchfork	37	
Slant Magazine	21	
Spin	3	
Uproxx	11	

== Credits and personnel ==
- Lana Del Rey – vocals, songwriting, production
- Jack Antonoff – production, songwriting, recording engineering, mixing, drums, programming, acoustic guitar, electric guitar, synthesizers, keyboards, piano
- Laura Sisk – recording engineering, mixing
- Jon Sher – assistant recording engineering
- Derrick Stockwell – assistant recording engineering
- Greg Eliason – assistant recording engineering
- Chris Gehringer – mastering
- Will Quinnell – assistant mastering engineering

== Music video ==
The music video for "Venice Bitch" was directed by Del Rey's sister, Chuck Grant. The vintage-inspired visual features "grainy footage, big moods, endless highways," according to Paper. Will Hermes of Rolling Stone noted that the video is "a collage of vintage Super 8-style freeway footage, faded, flashed, fogged, looped and sped up, intercut with weathered images of Lana hanging on her smartphone, or goofing around in a pickup bed with two female friends, trailed by what looks like a police car." He concluded that the video "magnified" the overall "hypnotic" effect of the song.

== Charts ==
Chart (2018)	Peak position
France (SNEP)	95
Greece International Digital Singles (IFPI)	97
New Zealand Hot Singles (RMNZ)	32
Scottish Singles Sales (Official Charts)	80
Spain Physical/Digital Songs (PROMUSICAE)	35
UK Singles Downloads (Official Charts)	76
US Alternative Digital Songs (Billboard)	10

== Certifications ==
Region	Certification	Certified units/sales
Australia (ARIA)	Gold	35,000^{‡}
New Zealand (RMNZ)	Gold	15,000^{‡}
United Kingdom (BPI)	Silver	200,000^{‡}
United States (RIAA)	Gold	500,000^{‡}
^{‡} Sales+streaming figures based on certification alone.
