= Violet Bent Backwards over the Grass =

2020 book by Lana Del Rey

- Author: Lana Del Rey
- Language: English
- Release number: 1
- Genre: Poetry
- Published: 2020
- Publisher: Simon & Schuster
- Publication date: September 29, 2020
- Pages: 128

Violet Bent Backwards over the Grass is the debut book by American singer-songwriter Lana Del Rey. The poetry collection, featuring over 19 original poems, 10 haikus and photography, including "13 longer poems" and several short pieces, is Del Rey's first published work and was released by Simon & Schuster on September 29, 2020.

In December 2019, Del Rey announced that she would be releasing a spoken word album to accompany the book, also featuring music by American producer Jack Antonoff, which was set to be released in January 2020. Following a delay due to personal problems, the album was ultimately released on July 28, 2020 through Interscope and Polydor. The cover artwork, a painting of an orange tree by artist Erika Lee Sears, was released in April 2020. The final release dates for the book were announced on July 9, 2020, with the album being released on July 28, 2020, and the hardcover book to follow on September 29, 2020. Half of the proceeds from the book will go to the Navajo Water Project.

== Background and development ==
Since her musical beginnings, Del Rey has expressed how she has been inspired by poetry, with Walt Whitman and Allen Ginsberg being instrumental to her songwriting. Del Rey has written several poems which she used as spoken monologues in her music videos and short films, the most notable being the lengthier, melancholic pieces featured in Ride (2012), and Tropico (2013), in the latter of which she also recited poems from Whitman's Leaves of Grass.

In 2018, Del Rey announced her intention to release a book of poetry. She explained how, following some writer's block while beginning work on Norman Fucking Rockwell! (2019) in 2017, she had begun writing poetry.

I think I’m just going to self-publish it and put it out beforehand. It’s kind of random. Which is kind of another one of those things I just want out there just for me. I literally might just drop these little books off at some bookstores in Silverlake and beg them to sell them. It’s been really cool for me ‘cause I was having a little bit of writer's block with the music last Fall and so I just sat down to write some words without music and I realised there was just a couple of things I wanted to say through some poems, which is funny. I feel like I’m in the 19th Century.

— Lana Del Rey

Shortly afterwards, Del Rey revealed she would be binding the book herself and be selling copies for as little as a dollar. When asked why the book would be so inexpensive, Del Rey replied "because my thoughts are priceless." However, Del Rey's original plans changed when Simon & Schuster acquired the rights and published the book regularly and at a standard price.

During her promotional cycle of Norman Fucking Rockwell!, Del Rey described the book as consisting of "thirteen long poems", though she has teased shorter pieces on social media since, including "Never to Heaven", "Happy", and "Quiet Waiter-Blue Forever", among other pieces.

Del Rey explained her process for writing poetry turned out to be notably different from her process for writing music. She said:

It's sort of in the vein of deep poetry where anything is allowed and it's totally free-form. Sometimes my pages will end with a couplet, right at the end, but it's mostly free-form.

The title itself is from a line in one of Del Rey's favourite poems she has written. The full line being:

Violet bent backwards over the grass
Seven-years old with dandelions grasped tightly in her hand.

== Release ==
Violet Bent Backwards over the Grass was released on September 29, 2020, as a 128 page hardcover book. On October 3, 2020, Del Rey hosted a surprise reading and signing of the book at a Barnes & Noble store in Los Angeles. The event was met with controversy due to Del Rey's decision to wear a mesh mask and take pictures in close proximity to her fans during the ongoing COVID-19 pandemic. The event got eventually shut down for not following health regulations. Del Rey responded to the criticism, saying that the mask had a plastic layer sewn into it.

The release saw success, with the book landing at number 4 of the New York Times bestseller list.

== Spoken word album ==
Violet Bent Backwards over the Grass

Studio album (audiobook) by Lana Del Rey
- Released: July 28, 2020
- Recorded: 2019–2020
- Studios: Conway Recording Studios (Los Angeles); Electric Lady Studios (New York City); Rough Customer Studios (Brooklyn Heights, New York)
- Genre: Spoken word
- Length: 38:50
- Labels: Interscope; Polydor
- Producers: Jack Antonoff; Lana Del Rey

Lana Del Rey chronology
Norman Fucking Rockwell! (2019)	Violet Bent Backwards over the Grass (2020)	Chemtrails over the Country Club (2021)

Singles from Violet Bent Backwards over the Grass
- 1. "LA Who Am I to Love You" Released: July 28, 2020

Professional ratings
Review scores
Source	Rating
The Guardian	3/5 stars
The Independent	3/5 stars
The Line of Best Fit	8/10

Violet Bent Backwards over the Grass was also released as Del Rey's first spoken word album. It was released through Interscope and Polydor on July 28, 2020, two months before the release of the book. Del Rey selected 14 of the 30 poems that appear in the book to record. In an Instagram livestream Del Rey originally announced the album's release date as January 4, 2020. She expressed her desire to have 50 percent of the profits benefit charities supporting Native American land constancy and protecting indigenous rights in the United States. She added that the album would cost "about a dollar" and that the charities would rotate every couple of years. However, the album has never been sold for $1.

Violet Bent Backwards over the Grass was released exclusively in physical formats, CD and vinyl record. The album's only single, "LA Who Am I to Love You", was released on the same day as the album and was made available on all platforms, including a limited time streaming release.

On September 22, 2023, the entire album was officially released on Spotify as a podcast.

Aside from Del Rey's own voice, the album features instrumental production from frequent collaborator Jack Antonoff, with whom Del Rey first worked on Norman Fucking Rockwell! and later on both Chemtrails over the Country Club (2021) and Did You Know That There's a Tunnel Under Ocean Blvd (2023).

=== Commercial performance ===
The album peaked at number 19 on Billboard's US Top Album Sales chart and number 3 on the US Vinyl Albums chart.

=== Track listing ===
Violet Bent Backwards over the Grass track listing
No.	Title	Length
1.	"LA Who Am I to Love You"	5:20
2.	"The Land of 1,000 Fires"	4:04
3.	"Violet Bent Backwards over the Grass"	1:04
4.	"Past the Bushes Cypress Thriving"	1:54
5.	"Salamander"	1:54
6.	"Never to Heaven"	2:05
7.	"SportCruiser"	6:53
8.	"Tessa DiPietro"	2:00
9.	"Quiet Waiter Blue Forever"	1:28
10.	"What Happened When I Left You"	1:18
11.	"Happy"	2:22
12.	"My Bedroom Is a Sacred Place Now – There Are Children at the Foot of My Bed"	2:00
13.	"Paradise Is Very Fragile"	3:36
14.	"Bare Feet on Linoleum"	2:52
Total length:		38:50

=== Charts ===
Chart performance for Violet Bent Backwards over the Grass
Chart (2020)	Peak position
French Albums (SNEP)	57
Polish Albums (ZPAV)	34
Portuguese Albums (AFP)	7
Scottish Albums (Official Charts)	11
Spanish Albums (PROMUSICAE)	59
Swiss Albums (Schweizer Hitparade)	82
UK Albums (Official Charts)	25
US Tastemakers (Billboard)	21
US Top Album Sales (Billboard)	19
US Vinyl Albums (Billboard)	3
