= Mariners Apartment Complex =

Single by Lana Del Rey

from the album Norman Fucking Rockwell!
- Released: September 12, 2018
- Studio: Conway (Los Angeles)
- Genre: Country; psychedelic folk; soft rock
- Length: 4:06
- Label: Polydor; Interscope
- Songwriter(s): Lana Del Rey; Jack Antonoff
- Producer(s): Jack Antonoff; Lana Del Rey

Lana Del Rey singles chronology
| "Woman" (2018) | "Mariners Apartment Complex" (2018) | "Venice Bitch" (2018) |

Music video
- "Mariners Apartment Complex" on YouTube

"Mariners Apartment Complex" is a song by American singer-songwriter Lana Del Rey from her sixth studio album Norman Fucking Rockwell! (2019). She wrote the song after a late night walk with her then partner, while they were reaching an "apartment complex". Produced by Del Rey and co-writer Jack Antonoff, it combines country, psychedelic folk, and soft rock over a balladic production. Lyrically, the narrator assures her lover of constant support and guidance in their beautiful yet problematic relationship. The song was released as the lead single from the album on September 12, 2018, by Polydor and Interscope Records.

Critics lauded "Mariners Apartment Complex" for its songwriting, production, and Del Rey's vocals. It was listed as one of the best songs of 2018 by Consequence of Sound and Rolling Stone. The song entered on the national charts in Australia, Croatia, France, Hungary, Ireland, Sweden, Switzerland, and the United Kingdom.

== Release ==
On September 7, 2018, Del Rey announced that she would be releasing two new songs, with "Mariners Apartment Complex" being released the following week. She subsequently shared a snippet of the song and its accompanying music video, which was shot by her sister, Chuck Grant. The song was released on September 12 after premiering on BBC Radio 1. In an interview preceding the premiere, Del Rey stated:

"The song is about this time I took a walk late at night with a guy I was seeing, and we stopped in front his friend's apartment complex, and he put his hand around my shoulder, and he said "I think we are together because we're both similar, like we're both really messed up" and I thought it was the saddest thing I'd ever heard. And I said, "I'm not sad, I didn't know that's why you thought you were relating to me on that level, I'm actually doing pretty good". And he was upset, and that's when I wrote the song. I thought, I had to do so many times, where you know like I had to sort of step on that role where I was showing the way and I was sort of being the brighter light. But that's why it's so cool that you’re playing it. 'Cause I thought that I'd just put it out and it would be one of those things that I'd put out just to have there for myself, but it's cool being able to share it with people too."

== Music video ==
A music video for "Mariners Apartment Complex" was released on September 18, 2018, six days after the song's release. The video was filmed by Del Rey's sister, Chuck Grant.

== Composition ==
"Mariners Apartment Complex" was characterized by Rolling Stone's Ryan Reed as a folky psychedelic song. Pitchfork critic Marc Hogan described the song as "a somber 1970s-style rock ballad with piano, acoustic guitar, and swooping strings." Mark Beaumont of NME called it "a classically Del Rey smoulder of silken acoustic country music and orchestral washes."

== Critical reception ==
The song received widespread acclaim from music critics. Billboard's Starr Bowenbank wrote that the song "features Del Rey's lush vocals against a beautiful backdrop of country-influenced guitar work, with her singing in wondrous whispers and dreamy layered harmonies about a beautiful, yet tumultuous, romance." In a review for Pitchfork, Marc Hogan stated that the song "posits a Lana Del Rey who is not only a fully rounded character but also a port in a storm, as recognizable and reassuring as the old AM radio staples the song updates." Rolling Stone's Brittany Spanos opined that the song "feels like a spiritual sequel" to Leonard Cohen's "Chelsea Hotel #2", stating that "Negating her earliest works, growing out of her previous attitudes and forsaking the image of the Good American Girl looking for a figure to make her feel wanted, desired and cool, this Del Rey has 'become the daddy.'" Anna Gaca from Spin noted that Del Rey "asks your understanding... your forgiveness... your grace... and in return, she offers everything: her power as a cypher and her vulnerability as an individual, bottled up tight in the character of Lana Del Rey and cast into the waves."

=== Critics' lists ===
Rolling Stone and Consequence of Sound ranked "Mariners Apartment Complex" at number 6 and number 29 on their respective lists of the 50 Best Songs of 2018.

| Publication | List | Rank | Ref. |
|---|---|---|---|
| Consequence of Sound | Best Songs of the 2018 | 29 | |
| Rolling Stone | 50 Best Songs of 2018 | 6 | |

== Credits and personnel ==
- Lana Del Rey – vocals, songwriting, production
- Jack Antonoff – production, songwriting, drums, programming, acoustic guitar, electric guitar, keyboards, piano, recording engineering, mixing
- Laura Sisk – recording engineering, mixing, additional programming
- Jon Sher – assistant recording engineering
- Serban Ghenea – mixing
- John Hanes – mix engineering
- Chris Gehringer – mastering
- Will Quinnell – assistant mastering engineering

== Charts ==
=== Weekly charts ===
| Chart (2018–2020) | Peak position |
|---|---|
| Australia (ARIA) | 93 |
| Belgium (Ultratip Bubbling Under Flanders) | 35 |
| Canadian Digital Songs (Billboard) | 34 |
| Croatia (HRT) | 66 |
| France (SNEP) | 35 |
| Greece International Digital Singles (IFPI) | 37 |
| Hungary (Single Top 40) | 39 |
| Ireland (IRMA) | 74 |
| New Zealand Hot Singles (RMNZ) | 11 |
| Scotland (OCC) | 72 |
| Spain Physical/Digital Songs (PROMUSICAE) | 14 |
| Sweden (Sverigetopplistan) | 78 |
| Switzerland (Schweizer Hitparade) | 89 |
| UK Singles (OCC) | 79 |
| US Alternative Airplay (Billboard) | 27 |
| US Adult Alternative Songs (Billboard) | 13 |
| US Digital Songs (Billboard) | 42 |

=== Year-end charts ===
| Chart (2020) | Position |
|---|---|
| US Adult Alternative Songs (Billboard) | 42 |

== Certifications ==
| Region | Certification | Certified units/sales |
|---|---|---|
| Australia (ARIA) | Platinum | 70,000^{‡} |
| Brazil (Pro-Música Brasil) | Platinum | 40,000^{‡} |
| New Zealand (RMNZ) | Gold | 15,000^{‡} |
| United Kingdom (BPI) | Silver | 200,000^{‡} |
| United States (RIAA) | Gold | 500,000^{‡} |
^{‡} Sales+streaming figures based on certification alone.

== Release history ==
| Region | Date | Format | Label | Ref. |
|---|---|---|---|---|
| United States | September 12, 2018 | Digital download; streaming | Interscope; Polydor | |
| United States | November 4, 2019 | Triple A radio | Interscope; Polydor | |
| United States | November 5, 2019 | Alternative radio | Interscope; Polydor | |
