= Ride (2012 film) =

2012 American short music film by Anthony Mandler

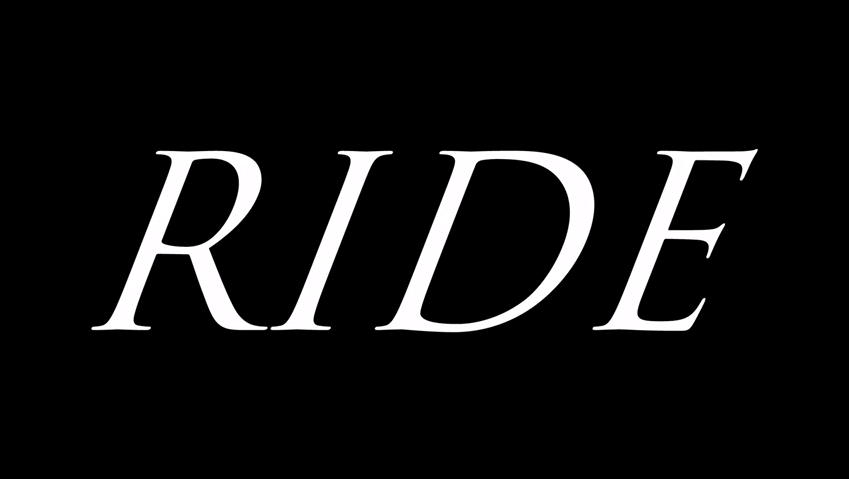
- The film's title card
- Directed by: Anthony Mandler
- Written by: Lana Del Rey
- Based on: "Ride" by Lana Del Rey
- Produced by: Heather Heller
- Starring: Lana Del Rey; Ian Seeberg; Scott Marlatt; Kevin Peterson; Josh Kurlups; Brian Harlow; Shawn Donohue; Steve Buchanan; Will Thomas; Charlie Grant
- Cinematography: Lana Del Rey; Malik Hassan Sayeed
- Edited by: Jeff Selis
- Music by: Lana Del Rey
- Distributed by: Black Hand Cinema
- Release date: October 10, 2012 (Santa Monica)
- Running time: 10:10
- Country: United States
- Language: English

Full film
- Ride on YouTube

Ride is a 2012 American short music film directed by Anthony Mandler. The film stars Lana Del Rey as Artist, a prostitute who leaves her opulent family and joins a biker gang on the open road. The film was also written by Del Rey, and is based on her song of the same name, from her extended play (EP) Paradise (2012). The film's supporting cast includes Ian Seeberg, Scott Marlatt, and Kevin Peterson as Artist's lovers, and Josh Kurlups, Brian Harlow, Shawn Donohue, Steve Buchanan, Will Thomas, and Del Rey's brother, Charlie Grant as members of a biker gang. Lasting a duration of over 10 minutes, the film serves as its title song's music video. Aside from featuring the song itself, the film also features "confessional monologues" spoken by Del Rey.

Ride premiered at the Aero Theater in Santa Monica, California on October 10, 2012. Two days later it was released onto the online video platform VEVO. It was distributed by Black Hand Cinema. The film's reception was mixed to positive, with critics complimenting Del Rey's acting, but generating controversy due to the film's portrayal of prostitution, adultery, gun violence, and cultural appropriation.

== Plot ==
The film opens to Artist (Lana Del Rey) in a cowboy-influenced outfit while swinging on a tire swing in the middle of the desert. It then cuts to show her roaming the streets in streetwalker attire while attempting to hitch hike, as a monologue about why she started prostituting plays in the background. Artist reveals that all her family and friends disapprove of her lifestyle, but urges that they are simply unaware of what it feels like to have "your home be where you lay your head". Artist proceeds to perform in a dive bar, revealing that she was a performer, but "not a very popular one". In her closing moments in the bar, she insists that she's always been different, and was "born to be the other woman". As Del Rey says this, a montage of clips showing her and her biker gang play as the titular track, "Ride", begins to play shortly after.

Artist has multiple returning clients, or "lovers" (played by Ian Seeberg, Scott "The Wall" Marlatt, and Kevin Peterson, respectively), that she eventually runs away from her home with. After a series of excursions, Artist says she "finally found her home" as she continues to enjoy her new lifestyle moving from motel to motel.

During their last night, Artist and her biker gang enjoy some wild times in the empty desert, driving bikes through flames, drinking excessively, and howling at the Moon. This scene is where the infamous "Indian headress" shot with Del Rey is featured. In a monologue at the end of the film, during which scenes are shown of Del Rey sneaking away with the bikers, Artist declares, "I am fucking crazy. But I am free" as she proceeds to swing on her free-hanging tire swing.

== Cast and crew ==
Cast

- Lana Del Rey as Artist, a prostitute who is involved in a biker gang after leaving her opulent family for the open road.
- Ian Seeberg as Lover, one of Artist's lovers.
- Scott "The Wall" Marlatt as Lover, one of Artist's lovers.
- Kevin Peterson as Lover, one of Artist's lovers.
- Josh Kurplus as Biker, a member of Artist's biker gang.
- Brian Harlow as Biker, a member of Artist's biker gang.
- Shawn Donohue as Biker, a member of Artist's biker gang.
- Steve Buchanan as Biker, a member of Artist's biker gang.
- Will Thomas as Biker, a member of Artist's biker gang.
- Charlie Grant (uncredited) as Biker, a member of Artist's biker gang.

Crew

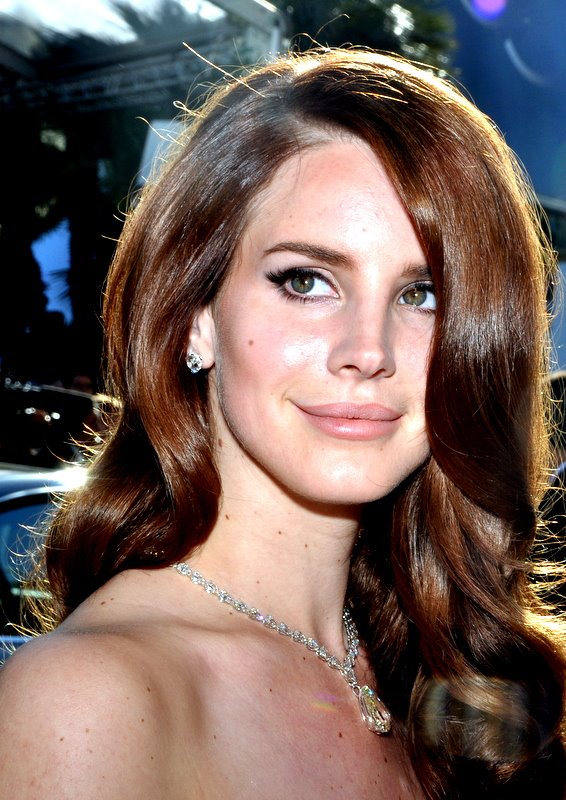
Del Rey in May 2012

- Anthony Mandler – Director
- Heather Heller – Producer
- Kristen Loftin – Production supervisor
- Malik Sayeed – Director of photography
- Benji Bamps – Production designer
- Diamond Dave – First assistant director
- Regina Fernandez – Art coordinator
- Johnny Blue Eyes – Stylist
- Savannah – Assistant stylist
- Anna Cofone – Hair stylist
- Pamela Cochrane – Make-up artist
- Hassan Abdul Wahid – First assistant camera
- Josh Davis – Gaffer
- Demetrie Cooley – Key grip

== Background and release ==
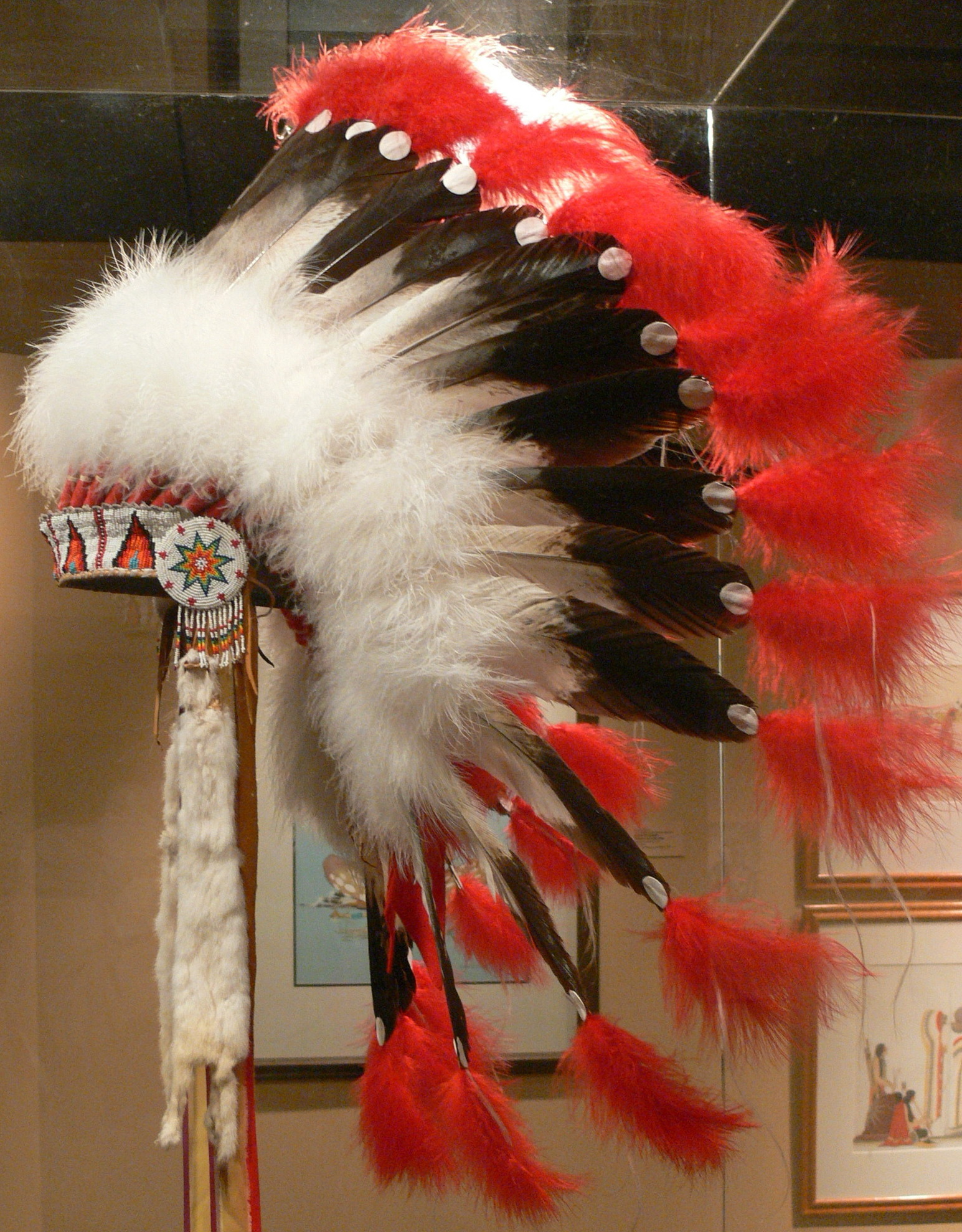
Wearing a Native American war bonnet (pictured), Del Rey aims a revolver at her temple while singing "I've got a war in my mind" in the video for "Ride".

"National Anthem" director Anthony Mandler teamed up with Del Rey to produce the video for "Ride." The video was a 10-minute-long short film and gathered an audience of 400. On October 10, Del Rey premiered the music video for "Ride" at the Aero Theatre in Santa Monica, California.

== Critical reception ==
NME journalist Lucy Jones compared Del Rey's role in "Ride" to Blanche DuBois' role in A Streetcar Named Desire, calling it a "neurasthenic wreckage." Further reflecting on the Lolita persona, Jones says, "Del Rey's character atrophies into prostitution, seeking safety in other people" throughout the video, which she labels dis-empowering for women, while Del Rey's "suggested acceptance of a young woman selling sex for a roof over her head" might be seen as antifeminist, a word attributed to Del Rey's work since "Video Games." OK! and Vibe also noted the prostitution themes, the latter saying, "Never has the art of prostitution ever looked so, cinematic."

Jones also noted similarities between "Ride" and the video for "Born to Die", specifically Del Rey's scarlet talons, red Converse, crucifix earrings, Stars and Stripes flags, tattoos, and guns. Jones speculated that the monologue was not autobiographical, so much as a jab at her critics. Pitchfork considered the metaphor-festooned monologue "moving." Writers for the New York Observer commented: "As a statement of purpose, it’s absolutely, refreshingly meaningless, not purporting to make any statement beyond provocation; as a creation myth for whoever Lana Del Rey is, it’s tremendously watchable. She strives for little more than that." Amanda Dobbins of New York concluded that the final scene belonged in Del Rey's hall of fame, stating, "it is really something." MTV Buzzworthy's David Greenwald contrasted "Ride" with films such as Easy Rider, mentioning that while it contained traditional American themes, it manages to retain credibility as a pop song on par with Nicki Minaj and Lady Gaga.

Critics took positively to Del Rey's acting in the film. Lucy Jones of NME stated "She’s a good actress; you can see the desire for oblivion and escape in her eyes."

=== Controversy ===
"After years of staying true to my own artistic visions, I met Anthony Mandler, who shared my love of all things dark and beautiful and understood my passion and revery for the country that America used to be. He’s helped me to bring the visions of my imagination to life and tell my different life stories through film..."

— Lana Del Rey, Rolling Stone

Controversy arose shortly after the release of the film due to its glamorization of prostitution, violence, affairs, and its featuring of religious symbols. The scene in which Del Rey holds a gun to her head and declares she is tired of feeling "fucking crazy" gained controversy due to the feature of Del Rey wearing a Native American headdress before holding a gun suggestively to her temple. Though criticized by some, the scene spawned one of her most famous quotes, and stills from it are prominent within modern-day pop culture, appearing on a variety of merchandise. Molly Lambert of Grantland dismissed Del Rey's use of the headdress, stating how "maybe it’s supposed to be a comment on the rampant fetishization of native imagery by bikers here... but [she] can't support it".

The film has been dubbed by some as "romanticizing" or "fetishizing" its topics, particularly its protagonist's relationship with "her men." Lambert of Grantland claimed the film was "peddling a fantasy of tender degradation and commercialized self-objectification as [a] road to freedom from personal demons" stating this 'fantasy' was "dark and strange."

Similarly, Sonic Youth musician Kim Gordon lambasted the video in her book Girl in a Band:

"Today we have someone like Lana Del Rey, who doesn’t even know what feminism is, who believes women can do whatever they want, which, in her world, tilts toward self-destruction, whether it’s sleeping with gross old men or getting gang raped by bikers. Equal pay and equal rights would be nice. Naturally, it’s just a persona. If she really truly believes it’s beautiful when young musicians go out on a hot flame of drugs and depression, why doesn’t she just off herself?”

In a more positive review, Jenn Pelly of Pitchfork praised the film as "a ten-minute (Walt Whitman) tribute to discovering true liberation on the open road".

== Legacy ==
Following the release of Ride in 2012, numerous works of the time were influenced by it. Rolling Stone drew comparisons between the film and Mandler's music video for Taylor Swift's song "I Knew You Were Trouble", primarily due to the use of a "confessional monologue" which is seen as a signature feature in Del Rey's video. In recent years, the film has been cited as having obtained a "cult following". In a review of a Father John Misty performance, Michael Love Michael of PAPER referenced the film stating how he saw it as "iconic" and praised its plot, joking at being where "[Del Rey] rocked a curly weave perm situation and hung out with biker daddies at arcades".

== Accolades ==
=== Awards ===
List of awards and nominations
Organizations	Year	Category	Recipient	Result
MTV Video Music Awards	2013	Best Cinematography	"Ride"	Nominated

=== Year-end lists ===
Critic/Publication	List	Rank	Ref.
Rolling Stone	The Top 10 Best Music Videos of the 2000s & 2010s	6	
