= Norman Fucking Rockwell (song) =

2019 song by Lana Del Rey

Song by Lana Del Rey

from the album Norman Fucking Rockwell!
- Released: August 30, 2019
- Studio: Conway Recording Studios (Los Angeles); House of Breaking Glass (Seattle)
- Length: 4:09
- Label: Interscope; Polydor
- Songwriters: Lana Del Rey; Jack Antonoff
- Producers: Jack Antonoff; Lana Del Rey

Music video
- "Norman Fucking Rockwell" on YouTube

"Norman Fucking Rockwell" is a song by American singer and songwriter Lana Del Rey from her sixth studio album of the same name (2019). The track was written and produced by Del Rey and Jack Antonoff.

The song was nominated for Song of the Year at the 62nd Annual Grammy Awards.

== Composition ==
Lyrically, "Norman Fucking Rockwell" features Del Rey singing in the first verse about a relationship with an immature man who will not take responsibility for his own faults, then admitting during the chorus he has convinced her to stay with him, though it saddens her. Del Rey overlooks his obvious faults, singing: "Why wait for the best when I could have you?" In an interview with Zane Lowe of the BBC, Del Rey commented on her forthcoming album's title track: "Working with Jack Antonoff, I was in a little bit of a lighter mood because he was so funny. So the title track is called 'Norman Fucking Rockwell' and it's kind of about this guy who is such a genius artist but he thinks he's the shit and he knows it and he, like, won't shut up talking about it."

The song's title is a tongue-in-cheek homage to painter Norman Rockwell, with its lyrics metaphorically painting someone blue in reference to his craft. Rockwell was earlier mentioned by Del Rey in her song "Venice Bitch", which also referenced the idea of being covered in "blue" in reference to feelings of sadness or melancholy.

The song is crafted in the key of C major, with an Andante Tempo at 77 BPM in 4/4 common time.

== Critical reception ==
Upon its release with the rest of the album, the song received critical acclaim. Jenn Pelly of Pitchfork praised the song for its direct, often cheeky lyrics. Rhian Daly of NME compared the song's lyrical themes to Del Rey's previous works.

== Awards and nominations ==
| Year | Organization | Award | Result | Ref. |
|---|---|---|---|---|
| 2020 | Grammy Awards | Song of the Year | Nominated | |

== Credits and personnel ==
Instruments/production

- Lana Del Rey – vocals, songwriting, production
- Jack Antonoff – songwriting, production, engineering, mixing, keyboards, piano
- Laura Sisk – engineering, mixing
- Jonathan Sher – assistant engineering
- Evan Smith – saxophone
- Phillip Peterson – baritone, cello, flugelhorn
- Victoria Parker – violin
- Chris Gehringer – mastering
- Will Quinnell – assistant mastering

Technical

- Mastered at Sterling Sound
- Recorded at Conway Recording Studios, Los Angeles, United States / House of Breaking Glass, Seattle, United States
- Mixed at Conway Recording Studios, Los Angeles, United States

== Charts ==
| Chart (2019) | Peak position |
|---|---|
| Czech Republic Singles Digital (ČNS IFPI) | 73 |
| Ireland (IRMA) | 40 |
| Lithuania (AGATA) | 51 |
| Netherlands (Mega Top 50) | 14 |
| New Zealand Hot Singles (RMNZ) | 8 |
| Portugal (AFP) | 62 |
| Slovakia Singles Digital (ČNS IFPI) | 74 |
| Sweden (Sverigetopplistan) | 63 |
| UK Singles (OCC) | 44 |
| US Bubbling Under Hot 100 (Billboard) | 12 |
| US Alternative Digital Song Sales (Billboard) | 20 |
| US Rolling Stone Top 100 | 62 |

== Certifications ==
Certifications for "Norman Fucking Rockwell"
| Region | Certification | Certified units/sales |
|---|---|---|
| Australia (ARIA) | Gold | 35,000^{‡} |
| Brazil (Pro-Música Brasil) | Platinum | 40,000^{‡} |
| New Zealand (RMNZ) | Gold | 15,000^{‡} |
| United Kingdom (BPI) | Gold | 400,000^{‡} |
^{‡} Sales+streaming figures based on certification alone.
