= Conway Recording Studios =

Recording studio in Hollywood, California

- Type: Recording studio
- Industry: Music
- Founded: 1972; 54 years ago
- Headquarters: Hollywood, California, U.S.
- Website: conwayrecording.com

Conway Recording Studios is a recording studio in Hollywood, California.

It started in the early 1970s as a mastering studio. Established in its modern form off Melrose Avenue in Hollywood in 1976, the facility occupies nearly an acre of landscaped grounds and contains three recording rooms.

== History ==
The studio is owned by Buddy and Susan Brundo. After moving to Los Angeles in 1972, Buddy worked as an engineer at Conway before purchasing the original small studio and adjoining property in 1976. Over several decades, the Brundos expanded the site gradually by buying and demolishing adjacent houses. He worked with studio designer Vincent van Haaff, whose acoustic concepts—particularly the "expansion ceiling" first implemented in Studio A—became a defining feature of the facility. Brundo emphasized natural light, open spaces, and landscaped walkways inspired by film-studio campuses and Hawaiian aesthetics, contrasting with the enclosed environments common in earlier recording studios. The facility has remained active amid changing conditions in the recording industry, including economic shifts and the growth of home-recording environments. As independent ownership of large commercial studios declined in subsequent decades, Conway became one of the few remaining family-run facilities in Hollywood.

== Description ==
Conway is noted for its combination of indoor studio spaces and tropical garden areas across its 54,000-square-foot (5,000 m^{2}) grounds. It incorporates a number of privacy-oriented design features aimed at preventing unauthorized photography, including gated parking areas capable of accommodating large numbers of vehicles and physical barriers intended to obstruct sightlines. Attempts to mitigate paparazzi activity have included fencing, screening materials, and measures to prevent climbing in surrounding trees.

== Selected list of recorded albums ==
- New Edition – New Edition (1984)
- Mötley Crüe – Girls, Girls, Girls (1987)
- Poison – Open Up and Say... Ahh! (1988)
- U2 – Rattle and Hum (1988)
- Tom Petty – Full Moon Fever (1989)
- Guns N' Roses – Use Your Illusion I and II (1991)
- Natalie Cole – Unforgettable... with Love (1991)
- George Strait – Pure Country (1992)
- Elton John – Duets (1993)
- Counting Crows – August and Everything After (1993)
- Selena – Dreaming of You (1995)
- Beck – Odelay (1996)
- Fleetwood Mac – The Dance (1997)
- Hole – Celebrity Skin (1998)
- Marilyn Manson – Mechanical Animals (1998)
- Blink-182 – Enema of the State (1999)
- Santana – Supernatural (1999)
- Foo Fighters – There Is Nothing Left to Lose (1999)
- Ricky Martin – Ricky Martin (1999)
- NSYNC – Celebrity (2001)
- Dave Matthews Band – Everyday
- Queens of the Stone Age – Songs for the Deaf (2002)
- Foo Fighters – One By One (2002)
- Maroon 5 – Songs About Jane (2002)
- Blink-182 – Blink-182 (2003)
- Evanescence – Fallen (2003)
- Britney Spears – In the Zone (2003)
- Limp Bizkit – Results May Vary (2003)
- James Blunt – Back to Bedlam (2004)
- Kanye West – The College Dropout (2004)
- Alkaline Trio – Crimson (2005)
- Mary J. Blige – The Breakthrough (2005)
- Rihanna – A Girl Like Me (2006)
- AFI – Decemberunderground (2006)
- Justin Timberlake – FutureSex/LoveSounds (2006)
- Beck – The Information (2006)
- The Roots – Game Theory (2006)
- Jimmy Eat World – Chase This Light (2007)
- Timbaland – Shock Value (2007)
- Britney Spears – Blackout (2007)
- Maroon 5 – It Won't Be Soon Before Long (2007)
- Rihanna – Good Girl Gone Bad (2007)
- Britney Spears – Circus (2008)
- Katy Perry – One of the Boys (2008)
- Beck – Modern Guilt (2008)
- Weezer – Raditude (2009)
- Flo Rida – R.O.O.T.S. (2009)
- Kelly Clarkson – All I Ever Wanted (2009)
- Soundgarden – Telephantasm (2010)
- Katy Perry – Teenage Dream (2010)
- B.o.B – B.o.B Presents: The Adventures of Bobby Ray (2010)
- Pitbull – Planet Pit (2011)
- Jessie J – Who You Are (2011)
- Drake – Take Care (2011)
- Pink – The Truth About Love (2012)
- Kesha – Warrior (2012)
- Maroon 5 – Overexposed (2012)
- Nicki Minaj – Pink Friday: Roman Reloaded (2012)
- Taylor Swift – Red (2012)
- Miley Cyrus – Bangerz (2013)
- Daft Punk – Random Access Memories (2013)
- The Weeknd – Kiss Land (2013)
- Iggy Azalea – The New Classic (2013)
- Skrillex – Recess (2013)
- Pharrell Williams – Girl (2014)
- Maroon 5 – V (2014)
- Ariana Grande – My Everything (2014)
- Taylor Swift – 1989 (2014)
- The Weeknd – Beauty Behind the Madness (2015)
- The Weeknd – Starboy (2016)
- Beyoncé – Lemonade (2016)
- ZAYN – Mind of Mine (2016)
- Childish Gambino – Awaken, My Love! (2016)
- Red Hot Chili Peppers – The Getaway (2016)
- Lorde – Melodrama (2017)
- Maroon 5 – Red Pill Blues (2017)
- Halsey – Hopeless Fountain Kingdom (2017)
- Travis Scott – Astroworld (2018)
- Ariana Grande – Sweetener (2018)
- The 1975 – A Brief Inquiry Into Online Relationships (2018)
- Lana Del Rey – Norman Fucking Rockwell! (2019)
- Tyler, The Creator – Igor (2019)
- Taylor Swift – Lover (2019)
- Lana Del Rey – Violet Bent Backwards Over the Grass (2020)
- Taylor Swift – Folklore (2020)
- Mac Miller – Circles (2020)
- The Weeknd – After Hours (2020)
- The 1975 – Notes on a Conditional Form (2020)
- Lana Del Rey – Chemtrails Over the Country Club (2020)
- Lorde – Solar Power (2021)
- St. Vincent – Daddy's Home (2021)
- Taylor Swift – Midnights (2022)
- Tyler, The Creator – Call Me If You Get Lost (2022)
- SZA – SOS (2022)
- Taylor Swift – The Tortured Poets Department (2024)
- Bleachers – Bleachers (2024)
- Kendrick Lamar – GNX (2024)
