= Sublime discography =

- Studio albums: 4
- Extended plays: 3
- Live albums: 2
- Compilation albums: 5
- Singles: 14
- Music videos: 7

American ska punk band Sublime has released 4 studio albums, 2 live albums, 5 compilation albums, 3 EPs, one box set, and 14 singles, as well as 7 music videos. In total, the band has sold 14.9 million albums in the United States. The band disbanded after singer Bradley Nowell's death in 1996, but subsequently reformed in 2023 with Jakob Nowell (Bradley Nowell's son) performing the lead vocal role alongside original band members Eric Wilson and Bud Gaugh. The group released their first album with Jakob Nowell, Until the Sun Explodes in 2026.

== Albums ==
=== Studio albums ===
List of studio albums, with selected details, chart positions and certifications
Title	Details	Chart positions					Certifications (sales thresholds)
Title	Details	US	US Alt.	US Rock	AUS	NZ	Certifications (sales thresholds)
40oz. to Freedom	Released: June 1, 1992; Label: Skunk Records (original), Gasoline Alley/MCA (re-release); Formats: CD, LP, CS, DD	140	—	—	—	—	RIAA: 2× Platinum
Robbin' the Hood	Released: February 8, 1994; Label: Skunk Records (original), Gasoline Alley/MCA (re-release); Formats: CD, LP, CS, DD	—	—	—	—	—	RIAA: Gold
Sublime	Released: July 30, 1996; Label: Gasoline Alley/MCA; Formats: CD, LP, CS, DD	13	8	17	—	6	RIAA: Diamond; MC: Gold; RMNZ: Platinum
Until the Sun Explodes	Released: June 12, 2026; Label: Sublime Recordings/Atlantic; Formats: CD, LP	19	4	3	81	34	

=== Live albums ===
List of live albums, with selected chart positions
Title	Year	Peak chart positions	
Title	Year	US	NZ
Stand by Your Van	1998	49	49
3 Ring Circus – Live at the Palace	2013	—	—
$5 at the Door: Live at Tressel Tavern, 1994	2023	—	—

=== Compilation albums ===
List of compilation albums, with selected details, chart positions and certifications
Title	Album details	Peak chart positions			Certifications
Title	Album details	US	CAN	NZ	Certifications
Jah Won't Pay the Bills	Released: 1991; Label: Skunk; Formats: LP, CS, DD	—	—	—	
Second-hand Smoke	Released: 1997	28	—	32	RIAA: Platinum
Sublime Acoustic: Bradley Nowell & Friends	Released: 1998	107	—	—	
Greatest Hits	Released: 1999	114	—	15	RIAA: Gold
20th Century Masters – The Millennium Collection: The Best of Sublime	Released: 2002	190	—	—	RIAA: Gold
Gold	Released: 2005	165	134	—	RMNZ: Platinum
Everything Under the Sun	Released: 2006	97	—	—	
Best of Sublime: Green Series	Released: April 29, 2008	—	—	—	
Playlist Your Way	Released: August 5, 2008	—	—	—	
Icon	Released: 2011	—	—	—	
Sublime Meets Scientist & Mad Professor Inna L.B.C.	Released: 2021	—	—	—	
Look at All the Love We Found: A Tribute to Sublime	Released: 2005	—	—	—	

== EPs ==
List of EPs, with selected chart positions
Title	Year	Peak chart positions
Title	Year	US
The Zepeda Demo	1988	—
Badfish	1995	—
What I Got	1997	169

== Singles ==
List of singles, with selected chart positions
Title	Year	Peak chart positions										Certifications	Album
Title	Year	US	US Alt.	US Air.	US Main.	US Adult	US Rock	CAN	CAN Alt.	NZ	UK	Certifications	Album
"Date Rape"	1991	—	—	—	—	—	—	—	—	—	—		40 oz. to Freedom
"Badfish"	1993	—	—	—	—	—	—	—	—	—	—		40 oz. to Freedom
"Work That We Do"	1994	—	—	—	—	—	—	—	—	—	—		Robbin' the Hood
"All You Need / Get On The Bus"	1996	—	—	—	—	—	—	—	—	—	—		split with Wesley Willis Fiasco
"What I Got"	1996	—	1	29	11	39	—	—	2	34	71	BPI: Silver; RMNZ: 3× Platinum	Sublime
"Santeria"	1997	—	3	43	—	38	—	90	—	—	—	BPI: Silver; RMNZ: 8× Platinum	Sublime
"Wrong Way"	1997	—	3	47	—	—	—	—	—	—	—	RMNZ: 2× Platinum	Sublime
"Doin' Time"	1997	87	28	—	—	—	—	—	—	42	—	RMNZ: Platinum	Sublime
"Feel Like That" (featuring Stick Figure)	2024	—	7	—	—	—	41	—	—	—	—		Non-album singles
"Garden Grove" (featuring Jakobs Castle)	2025	—	—	—	—	—	—	—	—	—	—		Non-album singles
"Ensenada"	2025	—	1	1	34	—	37	—	—	—	—		Until the Sun Explodes
"Until the Sun Explodes"	2026	—	1	3	16	—	34	—	—	— (Note: "Until the Sun Explodes" did not enter the NZ Top 40 Singles Chart, but peaked at number 40 on the NZ Hot Singles Chart.)	—		Until the Sun Explodes
"Can't Miss You"	2026	—	—	—	—	—	—	—	—	—	—		Until the Sun Explodes
"Gangstalker"	2026	—	—	—	—	—	—	—	—	—	—		Until the Sun Explodes
"F.T.R."	2026	—	18	37	38	—	—	—	—	—	—		Until the Sun Explodes

== Other certified songs ==
Title	Year	Certifications	Album
"Smoke Two Joints"	1992	RMNZ: Gold	40 oz. to Freedom
"Badfish"	1992	RMNZ: Platinum	40 oz. to Freedom
"Caress Me Down"	1996	RMNZ: Gold	Sublime
