= Gold (Sublime album) =

Greatest hits album by Sublime
- Released: November 15, 2005
- Genre: Pop rock
- Length: 141:58
- Label: Gasoline Alley; Geffen

Sublime chronology
20th Century Masters – The Millennium Collection: The Best of Sublime (2002)	Gold (2005)	Everything Under the Sun (2006)

Gold is a greatest hits album by the American rock band Sublime, released by Gasoline Alley and Geffen Records in 2005.

== Critical reception ==
Professional ratings
Review scores
Source	Rating
AllMusic	2.5/5 stars

Johnny Loftus of AllMusic stated that the album is "really an abstract, an only slightly condensed run through Sublime's three studio albums" and went on to say that "Gold isn't for anybody, because it includes too much shake for the noncommittal but not enough kind for the Sublime professionals." In a review for The Gazette, Anna Paige states that it "is a smattering of music" and that "Making Sublime a 'gold' band counters the culture they helped create" and also that "When 'Sublime Gold' skips tracks from the original albums I jerk suddenly, feeling that I have missed something great."

== Track listing ==
Disc one

1. "Don't Push" – 3:54
2. "Slow Ride" – 4:22
3. "Had a Dat" – 3:29
4. "D.J.'s" – 3:18
5. "Let's Go Get Stoned" – 3:33
6. "Badfish" – 3:04
7. "Waiting for My Ruca" – 2:21
8. "40oz. to Freedom" – 3:03
9. "Smoke Two Joints" – 2:54
10. "We're Only Gonna Die for Our Own Arrogance" – 3:07
11. "5446 That's My Number/Ball and Chain" – 5:18
12. "Scarlet Begonias" – 3:32
13. "Chica Me Tipo" – 2:16
14. "Right Back" – 2:49
15. "Date Rape" – 3:37
16. "KRS-One" – 2:24
17. "Rivers of Babylon" – 2:28
18. "Steady B Loop Dub" – 1:26
19. "Pool Shark" – 1:00
20. "Steppin' Razor" – 2:25
21. "Greatest Hits" – 2:54
22. "Free Loop Dub" – 3:09

Disc two

1. "Saw Red" – 1:58
2. "Work That We Do" – 2:38
3. "Cisco Kid" – 4:38
4. "STP" – 2:58
5. "Boss D.J." – 2:51
6. "I Don't Care Too Much for Reggae Dub" – 5:20
7. "All You Need" – 2:46
8. "Garden Grove" – 4:21
9. "What I Got" – 2:51
10. "Wrong Way" – 2:16
11. "Same in the End" – 2:37
12. "April 29, 1992 (Miami)" – 3:53
13. "Santeria" – 3:03
14. "Seed" – 2:10
15. "Jailhouse" – 4:53
16. "Pawn Shop" – 6:06
17. "Under My Voodoo" – 3:26
18. "Get Ready" – 4:51
19. "Caress Me Down" – 3:30
20. "What I Got (Reprise)" – 3:02
21. "Doin' Time" – 4:12
22. "Trenchtown Rock" – 1:42

== Charts ==
Chart performance for Gold
Chart (2006–07)	Peak position
Canadian Albums (Nielsen Soundscan)	134
US Billboard 200	165

== Certifications ==
Certifications for Gold
Region	Certification	Certified units/sales
New Zealand (RMNZ)	Platinum	15,000^{‡}
^{‡} Sales+streaming figures based on certification alone.
