= Look at All the Love We Found =

Studio album by Various artists
- Released: June 21, 2005
- Recorded: 1988–1996
- Genres: Punk, ska, rap, reggae
- Length: 60:00
- Label: Cornerstone RAS
- Producer: Sublime

Sublime chronology
20th Century Masters: The Millennium Collection: The Best of Sublime (2002)	Look at All the Love We Found (2005)	Gold (2005)

Professional ratings
Review scores
Source	Rating
AllMusic	link
Rolling Stone	link

Look at All the Love We Found is a tribute album by various artists dedicated to Sublime, released on June 21, 2005. The title comes from a lyric in the song "S.T.P." on Sublime's Robbin' the Hood album.

In May 2025, to celebrate the album's 20th anniversary, a remastered expanded edition of the album was reissued, containing new Sublime covers. Some of the additional tracks are covers taken from the 2020 covers album The House That Bradley Built and its 2021 deluxe edition.

== Track listing ==
1. "Badfish"/"Boss DJ" - Jack Johnson
2. "What I Got" - Michael Franti and Spearhead featuring Gift of Gab
3. "Date Rape" - Fishbone
4. "Get Out!" - Bargain Music
5. "Santeria" - Avail
6. "D.J.s" - No Doubt (live)
7. "Paddle Out" - The Ziggens
8. "Work That We Do" - Mike Watt and Petra Haden with Stephen Perkins
9. "Get Ready" - Filibuster featuring Half Pint
10. "Greatest Hits" - G Love
11. "Doin' Time" - The Greyboy Allstars
12. "Garden Grove" - Camper Van Beethoven
13. "April 29th, 1992 (Miami)" - Ozomatli
14. "Waiting for My Ruca" - Awol One, Abstract Rude, Josh Fischel and Transducer
15. "Same in the End" - Pennywise
16. "Pawn Shop" - Los Lobos

=== Reworked and Remastered ===
A 20th anniversary reissue included additional tracks and remasters of original tracks.

Side A
No.	Title	Artist	Length
1.	"Same in the End"	Pennywise	2:39
2.	"Garden Grove"	Jakob's Castle	3:14
3.	"Badfish / Boss DJ"	Jack Johnson	3:00
4.	"Slow Ride"	Slightly Stoopid / Stick Figure	3:52
5.	"What I Got"	Michael Franti & Spearhead / Gift of Gab	3:22
6.	"Santeria"	Avail	2:40
7.	"Pool Shark" (Live at Tressel Tavern, 1994)	Sublime	2:21
Total length:			21:08

Side B
No.	Title	Artist	Length
1.	"Wrong Way"	Zac Brown Band	2:18
2.	"Work That We Do"	Mike Watt and Petra Haden with Stephen Perkins	2:45
3.	"Greatest Hits"	G. Love & Special Sauce	2:36
4.	"Doin' Time"	The Greyboy Allstars	5:36
5.	"Waiting for My Ruca" (live)	AWOL One / Abstract Rude / Josh Fischel / Transducer	3:25
6.	"Work That We Do (acoustic)"	Pepper	2:47
7.	"Little District"	Long Beach Dub All Stars	1:59
Total length:			21:26

Side C
No.	Title	Artist	Length
1.	"Ebin"	Jesse James Pariah / Zayno	2:47
2.	"Badfish"	Denm	3:05
3.	"Garden Grove"	Common Kings	2:54
4.	"Ball and Chain"	The Vandals	2:42
5.	"Get Out!"	Bargain Music	5:41
6.	"Date Rape"	Fishbone	3:33
Total length:			21:22

Side D
No.	Title	Artist	Length
1.	"Pawn Shop"	Left Coast Sound / Wailing Souls / Milton J	3:47
2.	"D.J.'s"	Iration	3:26
3.	"Boss DJ (acoustic)"	Jim Lindberg / Pennywise	2:27
4.	"Get Ready"	Filibuster featuring Half Pint	4:48
5.	"April 29th, 1992"	G. Love & Special Sauce	4:22
6.	"Don't Push (acoustic)"	Migs	3:48
Total length:			20:42

Side E
No.	Title	Artist	Length
1.	"Hope (acoustic)"	Descendents	2:46
2.	"Saw Red"	Hirie / Jason J	1:58
3.	"Date Rape (acoustic)"	Pepper	4:29
4.	"Falling Idols (acoustic)"	Falling Idols	4:06
5.	"Caress Me Down"	Fayuca	3:39
Total length:			16:58

Side F
No.	Title	Artist	Length
1.	"Jailhouse"	Fortunate Youth	4:26
2.	"Get Ready"	The Elovaters	4:58
3.	"Paddle Out"	The Ziggens	2:29
4.	"Garden Grove"	Camper Van Beethoven	4:28
5.	"Rivers of Babylon (acoustic)"	Jake and Jim Nowell	3:50
Total length:			20:11
