= 20th Century Masters – The Millennium Collection: The Best of Sublime =

Greatest hits album by Sublime
- Released: October 29, 2002
- Genre: Ska punk, alternative hip hop, dub, alternative rock
- Length: 30:53
- Label: MCA/Gasoline Alley
- Producer: Paul Leary, David Kahne, Sublime

Sublime chronology
Greatest Hits (1999)	20th Century Masters – The Millennium Collection: The Best of Sublime (2002)	Gold (2005)

20th Century Masters – The Millennium Collection: The Best of Sublime is a compilation album by the band Sublime. The album was released by MCA/Gasoline Alley in 2002.

== Selections ==
The compilation contains ten songs, most of which also appear on Sublime's 1999 Greatest Hits set. The latter's "Pool Shark" and "40 Oz. to Freedom" are replaced on this release with "April 29, 1992 (Miami)" and "Greatest Hits", the latter of which is a track from the band's posthumous 1998 live album Stand by Your Van.

== Reception ==
Professional ratings
Review scores
Source	Rating
AllMusic	3/5 stars
The Rolling Stone Album Guide	2.5/5 stars

In a review of the album, AllMusic's Heather Phares wrote that the selected songs highlight "Sublime's dub and pop aspirations rather than their thrashy punk side"; going on to describe the album as "a decent, if small, retrospective that is worthwhile for casual fans."

=== Commercial performance ===
20th Century Masters – The Millennium Collection: The Best of Sublime peaked at number 190 on the Billboard 200 albums chart in December 2003. It was certified gold in 2005 by the Recording Industry Association of America (RIAA), denoting shipments of more than 500,000 copies sold.

== Track listing ==
No.	Title	Length
1.	"Date Rape"	3:40
2.	"Smoke Two Joints"	2:56
3.	"Badfish"	3:07
4.	"Greatest Hits"	2:55
5.	"Saw Red"	1:59
6.	"What I Got"	2:51
7.	"Santeria"	3:04
8.	"Wrong Way"	2:16
9.	"Doin' Time"	4:13
10.	"April 29, 1992 (Miami)"	3:53

== Charts ==
Chart (2003)	Peak position
US Billboard 200	190

== Certifications ==
Region	Certification	Certified units/sales
United States (RIAA)	Gold	500,000^{^}
^{^} Shipments figures based on certification alone.
