= Greatest Hits (Sublime album) =

Compilation album by Sublime

Greatest hits album by Sublime
- Released: November 9, 1999
- Recorded: 1991–1996
- Genre: Ska punk
- Length: 27:54
- Label: MCA
- Producers: Michael Happoldt, David Kahne and Paul Leary

Sublime chronology
| Sublime Acoustic: Bradley Nowell & Friends (1998) | Greatest Hits (1999) | 20th Century Masters – The Millennium Collection: The Best of Sublime (2002) |

Professional ratings
Review scores
| Source | Rating |
|---|---|
| AllMusic | 4/5 stars |
| Entertainment Weekly | B |
| The Rolling Stone Album Guide | 3/5 stars |

Greatest Hits is the first of Sublime's compilation albums released after frontman Bradley Nowell's death. It was released in 1999.

The enhanced CD contained two music videos: "What I Got" and "Wrong Way".

== Track listing ==
Greatest Hits track listing
| No. | Title | Length |
|---|---|---|
| 1. | "What I Got" | 2:53 |
| 2. | "Wrong Way" | 2:16 |
| 3. | "Santeria" | 3:03 |
| 4. | "40oz. to Freedom" | 3:02 |
| 5. | "Smoke Two Joints" | 2:53 |
| 6. | "Date Rape" | 3:35 |
| 7. | "Saw Red" | 1:57 |
| 8. | "Badfish" | 3:07 |
| 9. | "Doin' Time" | 4:11 |
| 10. | "Pool Shark" | 0:57 |
| Total length: | | 27:54 |

== Charts ==
Chart performance for Greatest Hits
| Chart (1999–2000) | Peak position |
|---|---|
| New Zealand Albums (RMNZ) | 15 |
| US Billboard 200 | 114 |

== Certifications ==
Certifications for Greatest Hits
| Region | Certification | Certified units/sales |
|---|---|---|
| United States (RIAA) | Gold | 500,000^{^} |
^{^} Shipments figures based on certification alone.
