= Opie Ortiz =

American tattoo/pop artist, muralist and musician

Opie Ortiz is an American artist specializing in tattoos, pop art and murals. Ortiz is best known for his art featured on Sublime album covers. Murals painted by Ortiz can be found in and around Long Beach, California.

== Career ==
Ortiz operated American Beauty Tattoo for approximately seven years before opening World Famous Tattoo. He currently works at Rick Walter’s World Famous Tattoo, located in Sunset Beach, CA

Ortiz was also responsible for the "Sublime" tattoo across Bradley Nowell's upper back, which appeared on the cover of the multi-platinum self-titled album Sublime, along with the flower art covering the front of the CD. He also created the burning sun on the cover of 40 Oz. to Freedom, the cover artwork for Second-hand Smoke, 1997's Doin' Time EP, as well as the Everything Under the Sun box set.

Ortiz once again collaborated with Sublime, now with Jakob Nowell, Bradley's son at the helm, and he designed the cover for their final album, Until the Sun Explodes, released on June 12, 2026.

In 2019, Ortiz was featured in Sublime, a documentary about the band.

Ortiz has been a member of the band Dubcat. He is currently a member of Long Beach Dub Allstars and is the lead singer on the band's 2020 self-titled album.
