= 187 (slang) =

Slang synonym for murder based on the California Penal Code

Section 187 (often referred to in slang simply as 187) of the California Penal Code defines the crime of murder. The number is commonly pronounced by reading the digits separately as "one-eight-seven", or "one-eighty-seven", rather than "one hundred eighty-seven".

The number "187" has been used by gangs throughout the United States and elsewhere as a synonym for murder; this usage has been documented in Florida, Wisconsin, the United Kingdom, Germany and Norway. It also features widely in hip-hop culture, such as in Dr. Dre's "Deep Cover" .

== California Penal Code Section 187 ==
California Penal Code section 187, subdivision (a) defines murder as "the unlawful killing of a human being, or a fetus, with malice aforethought". Subdivision (b) states that subdivision (a) does "not apply to any person who commits an act that results in the death of a fetus if any of the following apply: (1) The act complied with the Therapeutic Abortion Act [citation]. (2) The act was committed by a holder of a physician's and surgeon's certificate [citation], in a case where, to a medical certainty, the result of childbirth would be death of the mother of the fetus or where her death from childbirth, although not medically certain, would be substantially certain or more likely than not. (3) The act was solicited, aided, abetted, or consented to by the mother of the fetus."

In California, suspects are usually charged by reference to one or more Penal Code (PC) sections. Thus, the charging documents for a suspect charged with murder would be inscribed with "PC 187(a)" or just "PC 187". If a suspect is charged with attempted murder, then the relevant code would be "PC 664/187" because attempt is defined in Penal Code section 664. In Los Angeles, the standard bail for murder is $2,000,000. The standard bail for first-degree murder with special circumstances (that is, circumstances under which the district attorney is seeking the death penalty) is "INELIGIBLE FOR RELEASE".

== Notable uses ==
On the radio and TV series Dragnet, and other California-set police shows, the characters routinely refer to murders as "one eighty-sevens."

In the song "April 29, 1992 (Miami)" by Sublime, Bradley Nowell used the lyrics "And screamin' 1-8-7 on a motherfuckin' cop," alluding to Dr. Dre's song. The lyrics are related to the riots that ensued after the video evidence and eyewitnesses of police brutality, and the violence that was evident during that year.

One Eight Seven (also known as 187) is a 1997 American crime drama thriller film directed by Kevin Reynolds.

In the 1999 movie Magnolia, police officer Jim Kurring (played by John C. Reilly), thinking Claudia (played by Melora Walters) is involved in a situation domestic abuse, remarks that things can often go bad if the victim does not speak up, and he does not want to come out to a "one eighty-seven", a reference that Claudia does not understand, but he does not elaborate.

In the 1993 movie Demolition Man, set in the year 2032, the San Angeles Police Department HQ is alerted to a series of automated "Emergency: Code 187" events after the deranged gang-leader Simon Phoenix (played by Wesley Snipes) escapes from a cryo-prison facility, killing the warden and multiple guards in the process. There is confusion among the SAPD officers, as they are not familiar with the meaning of the code which seems to have fallen out of use, until Lt. Lenina Huxley (played by Sandra Bullock) queries the computer system, revealing that Code 187 refers to "Murder Death Kill", stating that the last known offense in the seemingly utopian mega-city was on September 25, 2010.

In the 2002 EP From the Depths of Dreams by the post-hardcore band Senses Fail, there is a track titled "One Eight Seven", with subject matter surrounding murder. It was one of their better known songs, but the band retired it from their live sets in 2013 due to the lyrical themes and Buddy Neilsen feeling that he had personally moved on from the song. In 2019, the band re-imagined From the Depths of Dreams including the song "One Eight Seven", which they had not played live in over five years.

Beatdown hardcore band Sunami have become known for their use of the code in the song "Contempt of Cop," where Josef Alfonso sings "187 on a P-I-G" as an expression of his hatred for the police. The lyric is one of Sunami's most famous, with Alfonso often allowing fans to sing the lyric for him at the band's shows. It has also been featured on some of the band's merchandise since release.

In the post-apocalyptic The FP film series, "to 187" another gang member is to defeat them in a dance battle, sometimes resulting in death.

The TV show Detroit 1-8-7 takes part of its title from the code.

== See also ==
- 187 Strassenbande
- 187 (professional wrestling)
