= Robbin' the Hood =

Studio album by Sublime
- Released: March 1, 1994
- Recorded: 1993–1994
- Studios: Various crack house living rooms in Long Beach, California; Westbeach Recorders (Hollywood)
- Genre: Ska punk
- Length: 60:40
- Labels: Skunk (original); Gasoline Alley; MCA (re-release)
- Producer: Sublime

Sublime chronology
| 40oz. to Freedom (1992) | Robbin' the Hood (1994) | Sublime (1996) |

Singles from Robbin' the Hood
- 1. "Work That We Do" Released: 1994

Robbin' the Hood is the second studio album by American ska punk band Sublime, released on March 1, 1994, on Skunk Records. It is noted for its experimental nature, low production values, and numerous samples and interpolations of other artists. It is their final studio album released in lead singer Bradley Nowell's lifetime.

== Music and background ==
Robbin' the Hood is notable for having low production values (the album sleeve boasts of its "13 self produced 4-track home recordings"), as well as including multiple samples and lyrics from other artists. The album also features three "Raleigh Soliloquies", selections from a rant recorded by a man with schizophrenia named Raleigh Theodore Sakers.

== Follow up ==
Some of the songs on the album contain parts that were later reused by the band on other albums. For example, the principal chord progression in the instrumental "Lincoln Highway Dub" was featured again in the band's later hit "Santeria", and elements of "Work That We Do" would later appear in "Under My Voodoo". Incidentally, it was during the recording of Robbin' the Hood, that the band recorded demos of "What I Got" and "Garden Grove."

== Influences and covers ==
Gwen Stefani, of No Doubt, contributes guest vocals on the track "Saw Red", notably before either Sublime or No Doubt enjoyed mainstream success. Many of Sublime's melodies and riffs have not only been influenced by, but directly taken from, other reggae artists and bands. "Steppin' Razor", originally written by Joe Higgs, was covered by The Wailers and later popularized by Peter Tosh in his solo career. In "Greatest Hits", Nowell mentions The Ziggens, their "brother" band signed to the same label. The guitar riff and associated rhythm in the song was borrowed from Yellowman. "Boss D.J." is partially a cover of a song by British reggae band Aswad, "Roots Rocking". "The Free Loop Dub" borrows the melody from the song "Loaded" by Scottish alternative rock band Primal Scream. "STP"'s lyrics "Baby you wanna give me kisses ... but a taste of honey is worse than none at all" are borrowed from "I Second That Emotion".

A number of other bands are either mentioned explicitly, alluded to, or sampled. These include: Steady B, Barrington Levy, Geto Boys, The Doors, Red Hot Chili Peppers, Bob Marley, Flavor Flav, Just-Ice, Beastie Boys, The Residents and Jack Owens.

== Critical reception ==
Professional ratings
Review scores
| Source | Rating |
|---|---|
| AllMusic | 4/5 stars |
| Punknews.org | 5/5 stars |
| The Rolling Stone Album Guide | 2.5/5 stars |

Pitchfork, reviewing Sublime's debut album 40oz. to Freedom and legacy in 2018, made a brief acerbic mention of this album, saying it "was so haphazard and caustic that only the most devoted fan could tolerate any significant time with it (it was recorded in a crack house, and it sounded like it)."

Sputnikmusic gives a more generous review with 4.5/5 stars, reviewing in 2008 and noting the prescience of front man Bradley Nowell's lyrics, "the messages within Robbin' the Hood leave timeless impressions. They preach real-life problems and solutions, and Bradley Nowell's lyrics were far ahead of his time," a nod mostly to Nowell's prediction that one day his substance abuse problems would prove fatal ("one day I'm gonna lose the war..."). The article praises the album's ability to mix its eclectic influences, all the while, "there isn't one noticeable mistake anywhere on the album". The article conjectures that the inclusion of the Soliloquies was for the sake of conveying the ethos of the band, "they really explain what Sublime was all about...fun."

== Track listing ==
All songs written by Sublime unless otherwise noted.

1. "Waiting for Bud" – 1:02
2. "Steady B Loop Dub" – 1:23 (Contains samples of "Badfish", and "Bring the Beat Back" by Steady B.)
3. "Raleigh Soliloquy Pt. I" – 1:46
4. "Pool Shark" – 0:57
5. "Steppin' Razor" (Joe Higgs) – 2:24 (Contains a sample of Steely Dan's "Do It Again".)
6. "Greatest-Hits" – 2:53 (Contains a sample of "Zungguzungguguzungguzeng!" by Yellowman and a partial cover of the Mad Mad riddim, first heard in "Mad Mad Mad" by Alton Ellis)
7. "Free Loop Dub" – 3:08 (Contains a sample of "Loaded" by Primal Scream.)
8. "Q-Ball" – 0:43
9. "Saw Red" - 1:57 (Featuring guest vocals from Gwen Stefani. Contains a partial cover of "She's Mine" by Barrington Levy.)
10. "Work That We Do" – 2:34
11. "Lincoln Highway Dub" – 2:21 (The intro is 30 seconds. The chord progression, melody, and elements of the guitar solo were later used in "Santeria")
12. "Pool Shark (Acoustic)" – 1:25
13. "Cisco Kid" – 4:38 (Contains samples of "Introduction" by Guru, "When the Music's Over" by the Doors, dialogue from Scarface, and clips from The Cisco Kid)
14. "Raleigh Soliloquy Pt. II" – 3:39
15. "S.T.P." – 2:57 (Contains lyrics from "I Second That Emotion" by Smokey Robinson)
16. "Boss D.J." – 2:51 (Contains partial covers of "Do it Twice" and "Waiting in Vain" by Bob Marley, as well as Aswad's "Roots Rocking", although Roots Rocking covers "Do it Twice" as well.)
17. "I Don't Care Too Much for Reggae Dub" – 5:20
18. "Falling Idols" – 2:37 (Ross Fletcher/William Pangborn III; originally performed by the Falling Idols)
19. "All You Need" – 2:45 (Contains a lyric from "Fight Like a Brave" by the Red Hot Chili Peppers)
20. "Freeway Time in L.A. County Jail" – 3:17 (Contains slightly modified lyrics from "The Hukilau Song" by Jack Owens and "Them Belly Full" by Bob Marley)
21. "Mary" – 1:34
22. "Raleigh Soliloquy Pt. III" / "Don't Push" / untitled / "The Farther I Go" (Mudhoney) – 8:29

=== Notes ===
- Track 22 includes several hidden tracks including an alternate version of "Don't Push" and an untitled dub song that includes snippets of "Boss D.J." The original Skunk Records release also contains a cover of Mudhoney's "The Farther I Go," which was removed from the Gasoline Alley/MCA re-release for legal reasons.

== Notable songs ==
The songs "Pool Shark," "STP," "Saw Red," "Boss D.J.," and "Greatest-Hits" became some of Sublime's best-known songs. Two versions of "Pool Shark," about frontman Bradley Nowell's addiction to heroin, appear on the album: An uptempo punk-rock version and a more emotional acoustic version. The uptempo version later appeared on Sublime's Greatest Hits album, while an acoustic version is featured on 1998's Sublime Acoustic: Bradley Nowell & Friends. "Saw Red" was included on Second Hand Smoke, Greatest Hits as well as the 20th Century Masters: The Millennium Collection: The Best of Sublime compilation.

== Personnel ==
=== Sublime ===
- Bradley Nowell - vocals, guitar
- Eric Wilson - bass, sh-101 synthesizer
- Bud Gaugh - drums

=== Additional personnel ===
- Marshall Goodman - turntables, drum kit
- Doug Boyce - turntables
- Kelly Vargas - drum kit
- Opie Ortiz - drum kit
- Gwen Stefani - vocals
- Michael "Miguel" Happoldt - manager, guitar, vocals
- Raleigh Theodore Sakers - vocals (tracks 3, 13, 14, 22)

=== Production ===
- Sublime - production
- Michael "Miguel" Happoldt - production, engineer
- Bradley Nowell - engineer
- Donnell Cameron - engineer
- Opie Ortiz - artwork

== Charts ==
Year-end chart performance
| Chart (2002) | Position |
|---|---|
| Canadian Rap Albums (Nielsen SoundScan) | 94 |

== Certifications ==
| Region | Certification | Certified units/sales |
|---|---|---|
| United States (RIAA) | Gold | 500,000^{^} |
^{^} Shipments figures based on certification alone.
