= 3 Ring Circus – Live at the Palace =

Live album by Sublime
- Released: June 2013
- Recorded: October 21, 1995
- Genre: Ska punk
- Length: 77:24
- Label: Gasoline Alley/MCA
- Producers: Jon Phillips, Jeffrey Azoff, Blaine Kaplan

Sublime chronology
Icon (2011)	3 Ring Circus – Live at the Palace (2013)

Professional ratings
Review scores
Source	Rating
AllMusic	4/5 stars

3 Ring Circus – Live at the Palace is a live album by American band Sublime, recorded at The Palace in Hollywood, California, on October 21, 1995. Lead singer and guitarist Bradley Nowell died less than seven months after the concert.

Sublime's first-ever, full-length concert recording, the release of 3 Ring Circus coincided with the 25th anniversary of the band's earliest show (July 4, 1988).

Released on June 18, 2013, the recording was produced as a single CD as well as a multi-disc set with video footage on DVD. A deluxe version included extras such as a poster, backstage pass, and a separate concert film recorded in 1995 at the Las Palmas Theatre.

== Track listing ==
1. "Great Stone" – 2:35
2. "We're Only Gonna Die for Our Arrogance" – 3:22
3. "Don't Push" – 2:52
4. "Garden Grove" – 1:24
5. "Don't Push" – 0:17
6. "Right Back" – 2:45
7. "New Thrash" – 1:05
8. "Saw Red" – 2:03
9. "Badfish" – 3:27
10. "All You Need" – 3:18
11. "Hope" – 2:33
12. "Foolish Fool" – 3:38
13. "Falling Idols" – 2:55
14. "Caress Me Down" – 3:53
15. "40oz. to Freedom" – 2:42
16. "Ebin" – 3:47
17. "54-46 Was My Number" – 2:21
18. "Date Rape" – 5:06
19. "House of Suffering" – 2:03
20. "D.J.s" – 4:26
21. "I Love My Dog" – 3:15
22. "Pool Shark" – 1:56
23. "Work That We Do" – 2:41
24. "Greatest Hits" – 3:22
25. "Smoke Two Joints" – 3:28
26. "Scarlet Begonias" – 3:08
27. "Ring the Alarm" – 3:02

== Personnel ==
Sublime

- Bradley Nowell – vocals, guitar
- Eric Wilson – bass
- Bud Gaugh – drums
