= Caress Me Down =

Song by Sublime

from the album Sublime
- Language: English; Spanish
- Released: 1996
- Recorded: 1996
- Genre: Reggae fusion
- Length: 3:38
- Label: Gasoline Alley; MCA
- Songwriters: Bud Gaugh; Bradley Nowell; Eric Wilson
- Producer: David Kahne

"Caress Me Down" is a song by Sublime from their album Sublime. It was never released as a single, but still receives substantial airplay on KROQ and other stations. The bass line of "Caress Me Down" features the famous Sleng Teng riddim from Wayne Smith's 1985 song "Under Me Sleng Teng" and lyrics and melody are primarily from the 1980s 12" single "Caress Me Down" by Clement Irie. The lyrics to the song are in Spanglish (a mixture of Spanish and English) and include a reference to porn actor Ron Jeremy, who also appears prominently in the video for Sublime's first single "Date Rape".

A demo version entitled "Caress Me Dub" can be found on the box set Everything Under the Sun and a live version which predates the version on Sublime which contains incomplete lyrics appears on Stand By Your Van.

The song is featured as downloadable content for the music video game Rocksmith 2014.

Although once a staple of alternative radio, the song has largely been removed from playlists since the early 2020s, due to the number of sexual assault allegations against Ron Jeremy, who is directly referenced in the opening verse.

== Posthumous performances ==
Sublime with Rome singer Rome Ramirez considers the song off-limits when performing live because of the lyrics "Mucho gusto, me llamo Bradley" (Nice to meet you, my name is Bradley). Ramirez stated in an interview in 2010 that he didn't "feel comfortable saying my name is Bradley cause I'm not Bradley, nor do I feel comfortable changing it cause that's a song he wrote."

In November 2024, after Nowell's son Jakob replaced Ramirez as the band's frontman, he performed the song live for the first time at the November Nights music festival in Phoenix, Arizona.
