= Badfish (song) =

Single by Sublime

from the album 40oz. to Freedom
- Released: January 8, 1993
- Recorded: 1991
- Studio: CSUDH, Carson, California
- Genre: Ska, reggae fusion
- Length: 3:05
- Label: Skunk, Gasoline Alley/MCA
- Songwriter: Bradley Nowell
- Producer: Sublime

Sublime singles chronology
"Date Rape" (1991)	"Badfish" (1993)	"Work That We Do" (1994)

"Badfish" is a song by American ska-punk band Sublime, released as part of their 1992 debut album, 40oz. to Freedom. The single was released in 1993, and again in 1997. The song was written by Bradley Nowell and originally recorded in 1989, reportedly influenced by the Ziggens song "All the Fun That We Missed" and Nowell's love of reggae. First released on the band's 1991 demo tape Jah Won't Pay the Bills, "Badfish" appeared again on most of the band's compilation albums. An extended play (EP) was released in 1995 named after the track.

The song resonated with the band's hometown of Long Beach, California (LBC), with familiar lyrics about the struggle of being in the working class, and utilizing local landmarks in the audio and video recordings. The track serves as an after-the-fact reminder of Nowell's struggle with heroin, and was reportedly informed by the slang term "Badfish" and his struggle to resist trying the drug.

MTV and radio stations refused to play the song prior to Nowell's overdose in 1996, but "Badfish" later became one of the band's most popular songs, and is one of the few beloved by Sublime's critics.

A tribute band, Badfish, is named after the song.

== History and writing ==
"Badfish"
Sample of "Badfish". The sample contains the "field recording in a bar", along with a sampling of the melodic and lyrical shift from their typical work.

"Badfish" is in the key of A mixolydian, which is a mode of the D major scale. Mixolydian modes are common in ska and reggae music.

The first version of "Badfish" was recorded as a student project for Michael "Miguel" Happoldt who was a recording student at the time and in a band called the Ziggens, at California State University, Dominguez Hills (CSUDH) in Carson, California in 1989. Happoldt, who went on to become a producer, guitarist, and vocalist for Sublime, asked Nowell if he wanted to record tracks in a professional studio, and the band recorded the track, which earned Happoldt a C-. Sublime recorded the remainder of their 1991 demo, Jah Won't Pay the Bills, with Happoldt at CSUDH and released it on Skunk Records, Happoldt's record label.

For LBC locals in the historically blue-collar industrial port city, where Nowell grew up, the metaphors of the experience resonated as a hard-times poetry, contrary to Sublime's typical straight-forward lyrics, allowing them to tout future lyrics like they were "Well Qualified to Represent the LBC" on their 1996 self-titled album. The introduction, "a field recording of a bar", was reportedly inspired by The Specials' 1979 song "Nite Klub", and was recorded at Shannon's Bayshore Saloon in LBC, and "Todd", who is told he can "turn the radio back on", was the bartender. The song's sound was heavily influenced by Nowell's love of reggae music.

Until 1992, Nowell feared heroin, and refused to try it. It is suggested that the term "Badfish" is slang for a heroin user who gets someone else hooked on the drug, or a heroin addict, and the song is described as being an anti-drug song to the scene that Sublime frequented early on, or as being written about Nowell's drug addiction.

Bud Gaugh developed a heroin addiction around the time the song was first recorded in 1989, eventually falling into homelessness. Nowell did not want the drug around the band, and Gaugh was ousted from the band while he was in and out of rehab until Sublime released 40oz. to Freedom and before they wrote and recorded Robbin' the Hood, when heroin quickly became a central part of Sublime's image. Reportedly devoted to maintaining an image representative of the local culture and their music, Nowell started a four-year battle with heroin in 1992. His widow, Troy Nowell, said he tried heroin because "it would be a cool rock-star thing to do," his father said that he wanted to be more creative and said that he needed to maintain a persona, Gaugh said he argued "the needle" was safer than smoking, and others have reported it was because other rock stars were doing it.

While "Badfish" came before Nowell's heroin addiction, on Robbin' the Hood, the song "Pool Shark" was written at the peak of his addiction with Gaugh, when he started to try to get sober. Lyrics like "Tying up the dinosaur, tonight/It used to be so cool/Now I've got the needle/I can shake but I can't breathe/Take it away and I want more, more/One day I'm gonna lose the war," speak directly to Nowell's use of clonidine, an opioid withdrawal medication, heroin usage and withdrawals, and his inability to give up the idea that heroin gave him a cool mystique. Nowell had gone to a treatment facility, and been clean for some time before he died after a relapse he said would be his last, on May 25, 1996. Gaugh kicked the habit after finding the body of his band mate.

According to Bert Susanka, the guitarist and vocalist for The Ziggens, Nowell's favorite Ziggens songs was "All the fun that we missed", which was reportedly the inspiration for the melody of "Badfish". The Ziggens played a cover of "Badfish" after Nowell's memorial at a gig at Knott's Berry Farm on June 1, 1996, just a month after Sublime played their cover of The Ziggens' "All the fun that we missed".

== Releases and reception ==
"Badfish" first appeared on the band's 1991 demo tape Jah Won't Pay the Bills. It later was released as the 8th track on the band's official debut album, 40oz. to Freedom on June 1, 1992, and the single was debuted shortly after, on January 8, 1993. The song is dubbed in Robbin' the Hood's second track, "Steady B Loop Dub", and appeared as the unnamed hidden 5th track on the 1995 re-release of the single "Date Rape". While "Badfish" was released prior to the band's Billboard popularity, and radio stations refused to play it until many years later, a Loudwire reader poll from 2012, that remained open as of January 2022 to voting, shows that it is one of the band's most popular songs.

In Pitchfork's 2018 review of 40oz. to Freedom, the reviewer did not care for the album, rating it a 5.6/10 and referring to it as a "flawed artifact of [the] '90s" with "burly, beer-gut ideal masculinity", but countered it with an affection for the combination of "Badfish" and its writer and vocalist, Nowell, as a "honey-voiced" "gentle soul".

"Badfish" has appeared on most of Sublime's live and studio-recorded compilation albums including:

- 13 Fl Oz. (1994)
- Second-hand Smoke (1997)
- Stand by Your Van (1998)
- Greatest Hits (1999)
- 20th Century Masters – The Millennium Collection: The Best of Sublime (2002)
- Gold (2005)
- Everything Under the Sun (2006)
- Playlist Your Way (2008)
- Icon (2011)
- 3 Ring Circus - Live at The Palace (2013)

The song also appeared on a number of promotional compilations including:

- Virtually Alternative 87 (1997) The Album Network
- Double Take (1998) Universal Music Group, manufactured for Target Corporation
- Fast Food (1998) MCA
- Guitars, Guitars, Guitars. (1998) Best Buy
- STV Sessions Vol. 1.0 (1998) Red Eye Records

=== Covers and tributes ===
In 2001, a tribute band formed, and named itself after the track. The band was nominated for Best Tribute Act in the Boston Music Awards in 2008.

In September 2020, Pepper, a band influenced by Sublime, and their record label, LAW Records, partnered with The Nowell Family foundation to release the compilation album The House That Bradley Built, made entirely up of Sublime covers performed by more than 20 bands, including O.A.R.'s cover of "Badfish". All of the profits from the sale of the album go to the foundation, which provides addiction recovery services, and will be used to open a rehabilitation center named Bradley's House.

A number of other bands have also covered the song:

- The Ziggens, June 1, 1996
- Jack Johnson, June 21, 2005
- No Use for a Name, January 24, 2006
- Sublime with Rome, July 12, 2011
- The Composure, June 18, 2013
- Badfish, September 12, 2020

== Music video ==
After "Date Rape" blew up, we went to Catalina and made a video for "Badfish". We sent it to MTV, they canned it, and radio stations wouldn't play it.

It's funny because by the time they finally started playing "Badfish" it was too late.

— Bud Gaugh

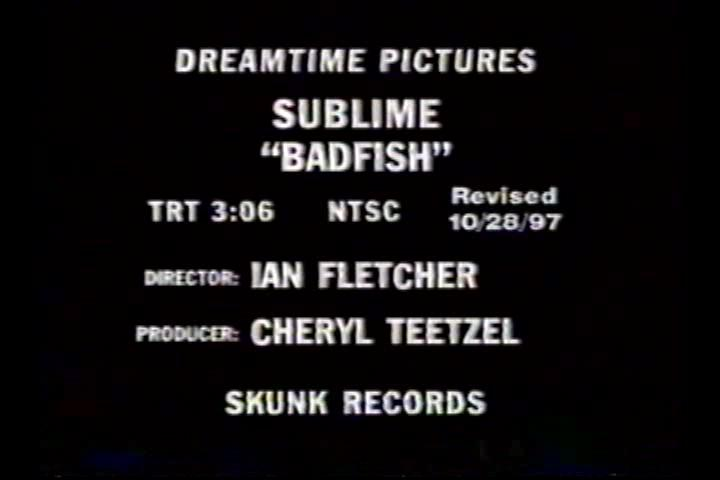
Credit and title screen from music video for "Badfish"

After the success of the single "Date Rape" from 1992-1994, a song the band says they all hated, Sublime tried to get "Badfish" to catch on in its place. Instead of sending the cassette to local radio stations, which were playing "Date Rape" non-stop, the band decided to try soliciting MTV and set out to make a music video instead.

The music video for "Badfish" was recorded in July 1995 at Sharks Cove (Shark Harbor) on the North Shore of Santa Catalina Island, California. The video starts out with a wave crashing into a fisheye lens viewed from the water. The setting matches the narrative and allegory of the song, referring to "big blue whale", "the reef", and swimming in the water. The colors become distorted for the remainder of the video. The band is playing live on the beach while the crew and several people are dancing and drinking, which matches the other narrative of the lyrics, drinking and partying. Nowell and his dog, Lou Dog, are seen on a reef, which is matched with some of the lyrics, "Won't somebody get me off of this reef?"

The video was produced by Skunk Records, Dreamtime Pictures, and Cheryl Teetzel. It was directed by Ian Fletcher. MTV refused to play the video until 1998.

As of February 2022, the music video had 41 million views on YouTube Vevo.

== Badfish EP ==
Badfish EP

EP by Sublime
- Released: 8 August 1995
- Studios: CSUDH; Mambo Sound & Recording; Komotion
- Genres: Reggae rock; ska punk
- Label: MCA
- Producers: Bradley Nowell; Michael Happoldt

Sublime chronology
Robbin' the Hood (1994)	''Badfish EP'' (1995)	Sublime (1996)

In 1995, Sublime released Badfish EP with Skunk Records. The single "Badfish" was re-released in 1997 by MCA Records.

The jacket was designed and illustrated by tattoo artist Opie Ortiz, who was the artist for most of the band's art, and Nowell's Sublime tattoo.

On April 22, 2017 (Record Store Day), in honor of the 25th anniversary of 40oz. to Freedom, Sublime released Badfish EP on vinyl. It was released by Skunk Records, and was a master vinyl pressing of 3,000 copies.

Professional ratings
Review scores
Source	Rating
AllMusic	3/5 stars

=== Track listing ===
No.	Title	Length
1.	"Badfish" (CSUDH, Carson, California, 1991)	3:05
2.	"Don't Push" (Original, Mambo Sound & Recording, Long Beach, California, 1988)	3:45
3.	"Untitled Dub" (Live at Kommotion in San Francisco, California, September 9, 1994)	2:50
4.	"We're Only Gonna Die for Our Own Arrogance" (Live at Kommotion in San Francisco, California, September 9, 1994)	3:18
5.	"Roots of Creation" (Mambo Sound & Recording, Long Beach, California, 1988)	4:22
