= Wrong way =

Wrong way may refer to:

- a traffic sign to warn of wrong-way driving
- nickname of Douglas Corrigan (1907–1995), an American aviator who flew east from New York to Ireland instead of west to California in 1938
- nickname of Roy Riegels (1908–1993), a college football player who ran a recovered fumble the wrong way during the 1929 Rose Bowl
- nickname of Captain Peter Peachfuzz, a recurring character from the animated television series The Rocky and Bullwinkle Show
- Wrong Way, a character in the video game Q*bert
- "Wrong Way", a song by Sublime
- "Wrong Way", a song by Creed from Human Clay
