= Playlist (disambiguation) =

A playlist is a list of video or audio files that can be played back on a media player in a desired order.

Playlist may also refer to:

== Albums ==
- Playlist (Babyface album), 2007
- Playlist (Birds of Tokyo album), 2015
- Playlist (Geri Halliwell album), 2016
- Playlist (Benjamin Ingrosso album), 2022
- Samurai Champloo Music Record: Playlist, a Samurai Champloo soundtrack album, 2004
- Playlist, an album by Salmo, 2018
- Playlist, a series of compilation albums issued by Sony Music label Legacy Recordings (and see See also section below)
- The Playlist (album), by British-Indian record producer Steel Banglez

== Other uses ==
- "Playlist", a song by Ufo361 with Sonus030, 2020
- "La Playlist", a 2024 song by Emilia
- Playlist.com, a defunct Internet radio service
- The Playlist, a British children's entertainment and music television series
- The Playlist (TV series), a 2022 Swedish docu miniseries about Spotify
- Playlist Studio, better known as Playlist is a South Korean production company
- The Playlist (website) or theplaylist.net, an American film and television news and reviews website

== See also ==
- , for a listing of Sony/Legacy compilation albums
- Playlist Your Way (disambiguation), entries in a compilation album series issued by Universal/Ruff Ryders/Def Jam
