= Sublime Acoustic: Bradley Nowell & Friends =

- Original 1998 album "cover" with no front insert in the jewel case and the CD made to mimic a contemporary homemade CD-R bootleg or copy

Live album by Sublime
- Released: November 17, 1998
- Recorded: 1991 – 1996
- Genre: Acoustic rock, folk
- Length: 38:32
- Label: Gasoline Alley
- Producer: Michael "Miguel" Happoldt, Paul Leary

Sublime chronology
Stand by Your Van (1998)	Sublime Acoustic: Bradley Nowell & Friends (1998)	Greatest Hits (1999)

Alternative cover
- Cover of the 2016 vinyl re-release

Professional ratings
Review scores
Source	Rating
AllMusic	3/5 stars
The Rolling Stone Album Guide	3/5 stars

Sublime Acoustic: Bradley Nowell & Friends is an album of mostly acoustic performances by the band Sublime, primarily solo recordings by singer and guitarist Bradley Nowell. It is noted for the fact that it does not include a front insert and that the compact disc is made to look like a recordable CD. Only the 2016 vinyl release has an album cover.

== Track listing ==
1. "Wrong Way" – 0:50
2. "Saw Red" – 2:47
3. "Foolish Fool" – 2:18 (originally performed by Dee Dee Warwick)
4. "Don't Push" – 2:58
5. "Mary/Big Salty Tears" – 4:57 ("Big Salty Tears" originally performed by The Ziggens)
6. "Boss D.J." – 3:05
7. "Garden Grove" – 1:58
8. "Rivers of Babylon" – 2:39 (originally performed by The Melodians)
9. "Little District" – 1:57 (originally performed by Eric "Monty" Morris)
10. "KRS-One" – 3:38
11. "Marley Medley" (Note: "Guava Jelly" and "This Train") – 3:00 (originally performed by Bob Marley)
12. "What Happened/Eye of Fatima" – 1:58 ("Eye of Fatima" originally performed by Camper Van Beethoven)
13. "Freeway Time in L.A. County Jail" – 4:23
14. "Pool Shark" – 1:26
15. "It's Who You Know" – 0:44 (originally performed by X)

== Chart positions ==
=== Album ===
Year	Album	Chart	Position
1999	Sublime Acoustic: Bradley Nowell & Friends	Billboard 200	107
