= Second-hand Smoke =

Compilation album by Sublime
- Released: November 11, 1997
- Recorded: 1988 – 1996
- Genre: Ska-punk
- Length: 63:16
- Label: MCA
- Producer: Sublime

Sublime chronology
Sublime (1996)	Second-hand Smoke (1997)	Stand by Your Van (1998)

Professional ratings
Review scores
Source	Rating
AllMusic	2/5 stars
Entertainment Weekly	B
Robert Christgau	(neither)
Rolling Stone	2.5/5 stars
The Rolling Stone Album Guide	2/5 stars

Second-hand Smoke is a compilation album by the band Sublime. It was released in 1997 following the death of lead singer Bradley Nowell the year before. Although this is technically a compilation album, it features some unreleased material as well as recycled and remixed versions of previous tracks. Even though the surviving members of Sublime (Eric Wilson and Bud Gaugh) stated that the band would not make any more albums after Nowell's death, which would result in the band's breakup, MCA bound them by their contract and made the remaining members follow out their contract with the next three albums. Instead of recording more albums with Sublime, Wilson and Gaugh would record together in their later projects Long Beach Dub Allstars and Sublime with Rome. In 2023 they reunited Sublime with Bradley's son Jakob Nowell and released Until the Sun Explodes

== Track listing ==
No.	Title	Length
1.	"Doin' Time" (Uptown Dub)	3:47
2.	"Get Out!" (Remix)	3:40
3.	"Romeo" (Demo)	4:31
4.	"New Realization" (Demo)	2:22
5.	"Don't Push"	3:55
6.	"Slow Ride"	4:22
7.	"Chick on My Tip"	3:16
8.	"Had a DAT"	3:32
9.	"Trenchtown Rock" (Bob Marley cover)	1:41
10.	"Badfish"	3:06
11.	"Drunk Drivin"	:18
12.	"Saw Red"	1:58
13.	"Garbage Grove"	2:12
14.	"April 29th, 1992" (Leary)	3:47
15.	"Superstar Punani"	3:17
16.	"Legal Dub"	3:11
17.	"What's Really Goin' Wrong"	2:36
18.	"Doin' Time" (Eerie Splendor Remix)	5:16
19.	"Thanx Dub" (Instrumental)	6:29

== Songs ==
The song "Get Out!" originally appeared on their debut album 40 Oz. to Freedom but had to be removed when the album was picked up for distribution by MCA Records due to the presence of an unauthorized sample (which included bits of Jimmy Page's guitar and a looped section of John Paul Jones' bassline from "The Lemon Song"). The samples were all removed or replaced and the song was re-released as "Get Out! (remix)" (the original version of "Get Out!" complete with the samples can be found on Sublime's "Bums Lie" bootleg). "Thanx Dub" is a slightly longer instrumental version of the extended version of the song from the original cassette release of 40 Oz. to Freedom.

Two of the previously unreleased songs, "New Realization" and "Romeo", were recorded in 1988, very early in the band's career.

The song "Chick on My Tip" is perceived as an entirely English language version of "Chica Mi Tipo" from 40 Oz. to Freedom although the Spanish lyrics do not translate to the same content as in the English version. The title "Chica Mi Tipo" translates to the English "My Type of Girl". The Second-hand Smoke version of this song was recorded in 1989, along with the tracks "Had a Dat" and "Slow Ride" (which all appeared on the band's 1991 demo tape Jah Won't Pay the Bills).

"Badfish" and "Saw Red" are the only songs to appear on this album virtually unchanged from their original LP versions; however both songs appear to have been remastered, if not remixed entirely. Some instrument sounds in "Saw Red", for example, come from the opposite stereo channel that they appeared on originally. Noteworthy of the song "Saw Red" is that Gwen Stefani sings a duet with Nowell; the song was originally released on the band's second album Robbin' the Hood in 1994, before either Stefani's band No Doubt or Sublime hit mainstream success.

== Charts ==
=== Weekly charts ===
Chart (1997–1998)	Peak position
New Zealand Albums (RMNZ)	32
US Billboard 200	28

=== Year-end charts ===
Chart (1998)	Position
US Billboard 200	147

== Certifications ==
Region	Certification	Certified units/sales
United States (RIAA)	Platinum	1,000,000^{^}
^{^} Shipments figures based on certification alone.
