= Badfish (band) =

American tribute band

- Also known as: Badfish: A Tribute to Sublime
- Origin: Rhode Island, United States
- Genres: Ska punk Reggae; Alternative rock Dub
- Years active: 2001 - present
- Members: Joel Hanks; Scott Begin; Pat Downes; Danny Torgersen
- Past members: Dave Ladin; Ben Schomp; Dorian Duffy
- Website: Official website

Badfish: A Tribute to Sublime is a Rhode Island–based tribute band dedicated to playing the music of Sublime. The group is named after a song appearing on the album 40oz. to Freedom. Formed in 2001 at the University of Rhode Island, the group's members, who were computer science majors, began playing local Rhode Island clubs and quickly began selling out shows. They continued touring the East Coast and Midwest of the U.S., becoming popular on college campuses and among Sublime fans who never were able to see the band due to frontman Bradley Nowell's death in 1996. Since then the group has done multiple national tours per year. In 2008, the band was nominated for Best Tribute Act in the Boston Music Awards.

The group played 152 shows across the United States in 2006, selling just under 100,000 tickets and grossing $1.4 million in sales. The group has sold out venues such as House of Blues locations in Chicago, Atlantic City, and Las Vegas, the Toronto Opera House, the Starland Ballroom in New Jersey, and Lupo's in Providence, RI. Members of the group also play in a non-tribute act called Scotty Don't, which sometimes acts as the opener at "Badfish: A Tribute to Sublime" shows. The band played at the Hoodwink festival in New Jersey in 2009, and Shwagstock in Salem, Missouri in 2010.

== Members ==
- Joel Hanks – bass
- Scott Begin – drums
- Pat Downes – vocals, guitar (Since 2007)
- Danny Torgersen – horns, keys, guitars (Since 2022)
- Dorian Duffy – keys, guitars, samples (2010–2022)
- Ben Schomp – horns, keys, guitars (2001-2009)
- Dave Ladin – vocals, guitar (2001–2006)
