= Stand by Your Van =

Live album by Sublime
- Released: June 23, 1998
- Recorded: 1994 – 1996
- Genre: Ska punk
- Length: 49:09
- Label: MCA
- Producer: Michael "Miguel" Happoldt

Sublime chronology
Second-hand Smoke (1997)	Stand by Your Van (1998)	Sublime Acoustic: Bradley Nowell & Friends (1998)

Professional ratings
Review scores
Source	Rating
Allmusic	3/5 stars
Entertainment Weekly	A−
Robert Christgau	(dud)
The Rolling Stone Album Guide	2.5/5 stars
Spin	(7/10)

Stand by Your Van is a retrospective compilation live album by the band Sublime. Tracks 1 to 11 were recorded live at Komotion, San Francisco, on September 9, 1994. Tracks 13 and 14 were recorded on the Warped Tour at Asbury Park, NJ in August, 1995. Tracks 12 and 15 were recorded at The Palace, Hollywood in October 1995. Track 16 was recorded at the House of Blues, Hollywood in April 1996. Lead singer and guitarist Bradley Nowell died less than two months later while still on tour.

== Track listing ==
1. "Don't Push" – 3:00
2. "Right Back" – 2:42
3. "New Thrash" – 1:03
4. "Let's Go Get Stoned" – 4:49
5. "Greatest Hits" – 2:57
6. "Date Rape" – 3:49
7. "S.T.P." – 2:46
8. "Badfish" – 3:04
9. "D.J.s" – 4:13
10. "Work That We Do" – 3:25
11. "Pool Shark" – 2:16
12. "Ebin" – 3:28
13. "All You Need" – 2:44
14. "Waiting for My Ruca" – 2:19
15. "Caress Me Down" – 4:22
16. "KRS-One" – 2:25

== Samples ==
At the very end of the last track, "KRS-One", the opening bass riff from The Descendents' "Myage" can be faintly heard.

== Chart positions ==
=== Album ===
Year	Album	Chart	Position
1998	Stand by Your Van	The Billboard 200	No. 49

== Personnel ==
Sublime

- Bradley Nowell - vocals, guitar
- Eric Wilson - bass
- Bud Gaugh - drums
