= Playlist Your Way =

Playlist Your Way is a series of budget-priced compilation albums and may refer to:

- Playlist Your Way by Bloodhound Gang, 2009
- Playlist Your Way by DMX, 2009
- Playlist Your Way by The Gap Band, 2009
- Playlist Your Way by Jodeci, 2008
- Playlist Your Way by K-Ci & JoJo, 2008
- Playlist Your Way by Marvin Gaye, 2008
- Playlist Your Way by Sublime, 2008
