= Everything Under the Sun (box set) =

Box set by Sublime
- Released: November 14, 2006
- Recorded: 1988–1996
- Genre: Ska punk
- Length: 187:08 (without DVD)
- Label: Geffen
- Producer: Sublime

Sublime chronology
Gold (2005)	Everything Under the Sun (2006)	Until the Sun Explodes (2026)

Everything Under the Sun is a 2006 box set of rarities from the band Sublime. It is composed in large part of tracks that can be found on previously released bootleg albums. The collection features material from throughout the band's career, from their earliest demos to other rare recordings, mostly live performances, which never saw release. A DVD is also included and features videos of the band's most well-known songs as well as unreleased tracks. The box set peaked at number 97 on the Billboard 200 albums chart in December 2006.

== Background ==
Even after the mid-2006 double-disc deluxe reissue of Sublime, the band's eponymous album originally released in 1996, a wealth of unreleased material remained. Fans created an online petition asking for the release of a box set of rarities. In November 2006, Everything Under the Sun was released. It contains three discs and consists of 60 demos, live tracks, and alternate takes, along with a DVD of videos and live performances. The set includes a version of "Doin' Time" featuring Snoop Dogg and an appearance by Gwen Stefani on "Saw Red".

== Critical reception ==
Professional ratings
Review scores
Source	Rating
AllMusic	3.5/5 stars
Punknews.org	4/5 stars

Stephen Thomas Erlewine of AllMusic wrote that Everything Under the Sun contains "a few mild revelations -- on the earliest recordings, their debt to '80s ska revival bands like the English Beat is clearer than ever, for instance -- but the primary purpose of this is as a clearing-house for rarities that have been circulating on bootleg networks". He added that the box set "not only does its job quite well, but it also does make a case that as a live outfit, Sublime had a muscular musicality and surprisingly fluidity that never quite translated in the studio as well as it did on the stage." In a Punknews.org review, John Gentile said that "newcomers might be overwhelmed at these recordings, but fans will find them to contain some of Sublime's loosest, finest recordings." Gentile complimented the selection of previously unreleased cover songs as a high point on the box set. Jeff Vrabel of Billboard remarked that the collection's songs "range from the interestingly raw to the unlistenable, especially when the band trades its slow-rolling, dub-style vibe for stabs at lo-fi punk." An article in the December 2006 issue of Spin said the box set is "as close as Bradley Nowell cultists will ever get to a new Sublime release."

== Track listing ==
=== Disc 1 ===
1. "Roots of Creation" (Demo)
2. "Ebin" (O.G. Demo)
3. "Ball and Chain" (Demo)
4. "Date Rape" Stylee (Demo)
5. "Perfect World" (Live in Studio)
6. "Johnny Too Bad Freestyle" (Live in Studio) (The Slickers cover)
7. "Smoke Two Joints" (Live in Studio) (The Toyes cover)
8. "I'm Not a Loser" (Live in Studio) (The Descendents cover)
9. "91 Freestyle" (Live)
10. "KXLU Interview" (Live on-Air)
11. "DJ's" (Nowell)
12. "Shame in Dem Game" (featuring H.R.) (Live)
13. "Get Out!" (Acoustic)
14. "Angelo" (4-Track)
15. "Mic Control" (4-Track)
16. "Farther I Go" (Studio) (Mudhoney cover)
17. "One Cup of Coffee / Judge Not" (Studio) (Bob Marley covers)
18. "Lou Makes Friends" (Live in Studio)
19. "Greatest Hits" (Live in Studio)
20. "Voodoo Part 2" (Original Demo)

=== Disc 2 ===
1. "Youth Are Getting Restless" (Live on KUCI Radio) (Bad Brains cover)
2. "Scarlet Begonias" (Live on KUCI Radio) (Grateful Dead cover)
3. "Right Back" (Live)
4. "New Thrash" (Live)
5. "Jailhouse" (Live) (Bob Marley cover)
6. "Pawn Dub" (Live)
7. "STP" (Live)
8. "Badfish" (Live)
9. "House of Suffering" (Live) (Bad Brains cover)
10. "We're Only Gonna Die" (Live) (Bad Religion cover)
11. "Great Stone" (Live)
12. "WBCN Interview 1" (Live on Radio)
13. "Saw Red" (Live on Radio)
14. "WBCN Interview 2/Minor Threat" (Live on Radio) (Minor Threat cover)
15. "Legalize It (Dave Aron Mix)" (Alternate Mix) (Peter Tosh cover)
16. "5446" (Live) (Toots & the Maytals cover)
17. "All You Need (Ashworth Mix)" (Live)
18. "Foreman Freestyle" (Live in Studio)
19. "Prophet" (Demo) (Slightly Stoopid cover)
20. "Miami" (Original Demo)

=== Disc 3 ===
1. "Marley Medley (Studio Outtake)" (Bob Marley covers)
2. "Paddle Out (Ruff Mix)" (Alternate Mix)
3. "Caress Me Dub (Outtake)"
4. "Foolish Fool (Unreleased Demo)" (Dee Dee Warwick cover)
5. "Westwood One Interview" (Live on Radio)
6. "89 Vision" (Unreleased Studio)
7. "Sweet Little Rosie (Studio Outtake)" (contains lyrics from Willi Williams' "Armagideon Time")
8. "Garden Grove (Take 2)" (Original Demo)
9. "Just Another Day (Studio Outtake)" (Falling Idols cover)
10. "Prince of Sin (Studio Outtake)" (Falling Idols cover)
11. "I Love My Dog Dub (Studio Outtake)" (Bad Brains cover)
12. "At It Again" (Nowell)
13. "Wrong Way" (Acoustic)
14. "New Realization" (Acoustic)
15. "Boss DJ" (Alternative Version)
16. "Real Situation" (Acoustic) (Bob Marley cover)
17. "Date Rape" (Live)
18. "Soundcheck Jam" (Live)
19. "Doin' Time - Snoop Time Remix" (Snoop Dogg Remix)
20. "Doin' Time - Tricked Out Life Sentence Remix" (DJ Spooky Remix)

=== DVD ===
1. "Don't Push" (Live at House of Blues in West Hollywood - 4/5/1996)
2. "Garden Grove" (Live at House of Blues in West Hollywood - 4/5/1996)
3. "Right Back" (Live at House of Blues in West Hollywood - 4/5/1996)
4. "New Thrash" (Live at House of Blues in West Hollywood - 4/5/1996)
5. "Same In the End" (Video)
6. "Caress Me Down" (Live at The Palace in Hollywood - 10/21/1995 )
7. "Real Situation" (Video)
8. "Atlanta Interview" (Warped Tour 6/17/1995 by MTV)
9. "Seed" (Video)
10. "Saw Red", featuring Gwen Stefani (Live at KROQ Weenie Roast 6/17/1995)
11. "Miami" (Video)
12. "Hong Kong Phooey" (Video)
13. "All You Need Video" (Video)
14. "Mary" (Acoustic Live in Anaheim 2/2/1995)
15. "Badfish" (Video)
16. "Date Rape" (Video)
17. "STP Video" (Video)
18. "Ebin" (Live at The Lab in Costa Mesa 2/27/1994)
19. "Leaving Babylon" (Live in Costa Rica April 1993)
20. "Don't Push" (Live backyard Party 4/20/1990)
- Page 1 of the Chapters menu features a performance of "Slow Ride" in the background, page 2 features footage from one camera from the video of "Date Rape."

== Charts ==
Chart performance for Everything Under the Sun
Chart (2006)	Peak position
US Billboard 200	97
