= April 29, 1992 (Miami) =

1996 song by Sublime

Song by Sublime

from the album Sublime
- Language: English
- Released: July 30, 1996
- Genre: Alternative hip hop; reggae fusion
- Length: 3:53
- Label: Gasoline Alley; MCA
- Songwriters: Marshall Goodman; Michael Happoldt; Bradley Nowell; Lawrence Parker
- Producer: David Kahne

"April 29, 1992 (Leary)"

Song by Sublime

from the album Second-hand Smoke
- Language: English
- Released: November 11, 1997
- Genre: Alternative pop; rock; ska punk
- Length: 3:47
- Label: MCA
- Songwriters: Marshall Goodman; Michael Happoldt; Jakob Nowell; Lawrence Parker
- Producer: Paul Leary

"April 29, 1992 (Miami)" is a song written by American rock band Sublime in 1996 from their eponymous album Sublime. The song title refers to the date of the beginning of the 1992 Los Angeles riots, of which news spread throughout the United States following the acquittal of four police officers accused in the videotaped beating of Rodney King.

== Background ==
The official title of the song references the date April 29, 1992; however, the lyric is sung as "April 26, 1992." It has been said this was a mistake, but the take was strong enough that the band kept it. Theories have developed about the true integrity of the song's lyrics. The acts of crime including arson, robbery, and vandalism referenced in the lyrics were purportedly committed by Bradley Nowell and other Sublime band members during the 1992 LA riots. The lyrics also offer a justification for the band's alleged participation in the unrest:

They said it was for the black man,

They said it was for the Mexican
And not for the white man
But if you look at the street, it wasn't about Rodney King
It's this fucked-up situation and these fucked-up police

It's about coming up and staying on top
And screaming 1-8-7 on a motherfuckin' cop

It's not in the paper, it's on the wall
National Guard

Smoke from all around

The lyrics allude to the songs "187 (It's On)" by Snoop Dogg and Dr. Dre and "Burn, Hollywood, Burn" by Public Enemy.

== Alternate version ==
After lead singer and guitarist Bradley Nowell's death, the two surviving members of the band released every mix and alternate version that the band had recorded. Along with those recordings, an alternate version of "Miami" was released on their 1997 compilation album Second-hand Smoke titled "April 29, 1992 (Leary)".

== Personnel ==
- Bradley Nowell – guitar, vocals
- Eric Wilson – bass
- Bud Gaugh – percussion
- Marshall Goodman - scratches
- David Kahne – piano
