= Sublime (album) =

Studio album by Sublime
- Released: July 30, 1996
- Recorded: February–May 1996
- Studios: Pedernales Studio, Austin, Texas; Total Access Recording, Redondo Beach, California
- Genres: Ska punk; reggae rock; alternative rock; hip-hop
- Length: 58:31
- Label: MCA
- Producers: Paul Leary; David Kahne

Sublime chronology
| Robbin' the Hood (1994) | Sublime (1996) | Second-hand Smoke (1997) |

Singles from Sublime
- 1. "What I Got" Released: July 23, 1996; 2. "Santeria" Released: January 7, 1997; 3. "Wrong Way" Released: May 25, 1997; 4. "Doin' Time" Released: November 25, 1997

Sublime is the third studio album by the American ska punk band Sublime. Produced by Paul Leary and David Kahne, the album was released on July 30, 1996, by MCA Records. It is their first release following the death of singer Bradley Nowell and is the final studio album to feature him.

By the time it came to record their major label debut, Nowell had been struggling with a heroin addiction. Sublime was recorded over a period of three months in Austin, Texas, in sessions characterized by heavy drug use and raucous partying. The album's musical style contains elements of punk rock, reggae, and ska, as well as dancehall, hip-hop, and dub music, with tempos ranging wildly. Nowell's lyrical subject matter relates to relationships, prostitution, riots, and addiction. Nowell died due to a heroin overdose in May 1996, just two months prior to the band's major album release, which led to the band's dissolution.

Bolstered by numerous hit singles, among them "What I Got", "Santeria", and "Wrong Way", the record proved to be enormously successful, despite the band being defunct and thus not able to promote the album through touring. It sold over five million copies in the United States by the end of the decade, and it continues to be a popular catalog album, being certified Diamond by RIAA in 2026. The album was released during the third wave ska peak, and etched Sublime into a permanent place among the stars of the 1990s. Critical reviews were positive, praising Nowell's songwriting ability and the album's musical variety. Sublime has since been listed as one of the most well-regarded albums of the 1990s by Spin and Rolling Stone.

== Background ==
Sublime formed in Long Beach, California in 1988 by vocalist/guitarist Bradley Nowell, bassist Eric Wilson, and drummer Bud Gaugh. The group originated as a garage punk band, and they eventually began to infuse elements of reggae and ska over the course of their existence. The group formed playing backyard parties, attracting crowds of 300–400 people. The band toured heavily over the ensuing years, leading to a major following among the beach-oriented surfing/skateboarding subcultures. By 1990, the band had become a mainstay along the Southern California coast scene, and Nowell dropped out of California State University Long Beach one semester shy of graduating. The trio recorded their debut album, 40 Oz. to Freedom, in 1992, selling the independent release at live performances. Local radio station KROQ began spinning the single "Date Rape" two years following its release, and Sublime rose to fame. By this point, the band had dropped "Date Rape" from their setlists, but the ensuing success of the single led 40 Oz. to place on Soundscan's alternative chart for 70 straight weeks.

MCA signed the group shortly thereafter, releasing their second album Robbin' the Hood in 1994. The record was nevertheless carried by various independent distributors, which placed it in independent record shops, surf/skate shops, and "head shops", in a marketing effort designed to appeal to the band's fan base. The band also adopted the Internet as a viable promotional tool, distributing their albums through early online music retailers. Despite this, Nowell had developed an addiction to heroin; at live performances, he would often be unable to make it through sets. On several occasions, he would steal the band's equipment for a night's performance to pawn for drug money, knowing band manager Michael "Miguel" Happoldt would find a way to re-acquire the equipment. He used clonidine patches in an attempt to quit, determined to do so both before signing to MCA and before the birth of his son the following year.

Robbin' the Hood performed well on college radio, and Sublime continued to grow in popularity, alongside the breakthrough success of such fellow California punk bands as Green Day and the Offspring. Nowell's addiction worsened over the course of late 1995 and early 1996; on May 25, 1996, Nowell died at age 28 in a San Francisco hotel room of a heroin overdose. According to one report, Gaugh had raided Nowell's stash and shot up while he was away; he awoke hours later beside the deceased Nowell in bed. Gaugh later told a reporter that "I thought, 'That was probably supposed to be me.'"

== Recording and production ==
Sublime was largely recorded at Willie Nelson's Pedernales Studio in Austin, Texas between February and May 1996. Although he had previously attempted to discontinue his heroin use, Nowell returned to the drug, "more vigorously than ever." According to Leary, on some days, the band would arrive at 9am "with margaritas in one hand and instruments in the other," ready to record; on others, "they nearly burned the place down."

Nowell was so addled with the drug that he was sent home by Leary before the recording process was complete. "There were times where someone had to go into the bathroom to see if Brad was still alive," he remarked. According to Nowell's father, it took his son three days to recover, commenting, "It was the worst I'd ever seen him."

The album was originally intended to open with a cover of Bob Marley's "Trenchtown Rock", followed by "Doin' Time" – a loose cover of "Summertime" by George Gershwin. However, Sublime were initially unable to get the rights for "Summertime", so Nowell discarded "Doin' Time" as well as "Trenchtown Rock" entirely and re-sequenced the album.

The band managed to gain the rights to the song before the album was released, and "Doin' Time" was added to the end of the tracklist at the 11th hour. In order to release the song using the Gershwin sample, the band had to agree to use the line "summertime" instead of "doin' time". However, the song was already recorded with the "doin' time" lyric, and lead singer Bradley Nowell had recently died of a heroin overdose. The lyric was re-recorded by Sublime's friend/producer Michael Happoldt singing "summertime". It is this version of the song that appears on the album.

The album's original sequence, along with the original mix of "Doin' Time", was restored for the album's 10th Anniversary reissue. Also released was a bonus disc with unreleased music, including acoustic versions, remixes, and alternate versions of several of the songs.

== Music and composition ==
Sublime features elements of punk rock, dub, hardcore punk, hip-hop, reggae, blues, folk, ska and surf music.

The album has been classified by critics as ska punk and alternative rock.

=== Cover songs ===
- "Pawn Shop" is a cover of "War Deh Round A John Shop" by the Wailing Souls with modified lyrics.
- "What I Got" is based on Half Pint's "Loving" and features a similar melody to the Beatles's "Lady Madonna".
- Sublime also covers the Wailers' 1965 song "Jailhouse", written by Bunny Wailer, combining it with a partial cover of Tenor Saw's "Roll Call" in "Jailhouse".
- "The Ballad of Johnny Butt" is largely a cover of a Secret Hate song of the same name from their Vegetables Dancing + Live & More album.
- "Doin' Time" is a loose cover of the jazz standard "Summertime" by George Gershwin.
- "Get Ready" is largely based on Frankie Paul's 1987 single of the same name.

=== Samples ===
Some of the album's original compositions also have samples:

- While "April 29, 1992" is an original song, it features samples from "La Di Da Di" by Doug E. Fresh featuring MC Ricky D (a.k.a. Slick Rick), "Original Gangster of Hip-Hop" by Just-Ice, and "Shook One (Part 1)" by Mobb Deep.
- The heavy bass line of "Garden Grove" is based on Courtney Melody's 1988 7' single "A Ninja Mi Ninja", and a synth loop in the third verse is lifted from the Ohio Players' "Funky Worm".
- Much of the rhythm and melody of "Wrong Way" was borrowed from the Specials "It's Up To You" off their 1979 self-titled album.
- Part of the melody from "Seed" was taken from the Bel-Airs 1961 single "Mr. Moto" as well as "Lori Meyers" by NOFX.
- The guitar solo and chords in "Santeria" were a reuse of the ones in their song "Lincoln Highway Dub" featured on the previous album, Robbin' the Hood.
- "Burritos" is a reworked version of one of Sublime's earliest recordings called "Fighting Blindly", albeit with vastly different lyrics.
- The bass line of "Caress Me Down" features the famous Sleng Teng riddim from Wayne Smith's 1985 song "Under Me Sleng Teng" and lyrics and melody are primarily from the 1980s 12-inch single "Caress Me Down" by Clement Irie.

== Cover art ==
The cover art shows frontman Bradley Nowell posing with his back turned showing off his tattoo of the band's logo. The tattoo was applied by Long Beach artist Opie Ortiz on September 29, 1995. Ortiz's pop art had been featured on the band's albums before, namely their iconic "sun" logo used on 40oz to Freedom.

== Release ==
Sublime was released in the United States on July 30, 1996, with releases in Europe following that October and in Australia and Japan in December. MCA drafted the band's former promotional team at Gasoline Alley (renaming the team Sublime Marketing) to promote Sublime through methods that played to the band's fan base. This marketing included posters and advance copies at independent shops, and advertisements in board-sport and alternative magazines. Promoting the album proved to be challenging due to Nowell's death, with no band to provide touring support or broadcast appearances.

The album soon began to expand upon the band's surf/skate fan base, appealing to consumers not associated with that community. At least one retailer attributed this to Nowell's death, remarking to Billboard that "death sells," comparing a similar situation in which Roy Orbison's discography rose in sales following his passing. Eric Weissbard, in a Spin column, compared Nowell's posthumous success to that of Jonathan Larson, the composer of the Broadway musical Rent, who died the day before the musical's scheduled premiere earlier in the year. Billboard deemed the band's posthumous success "a tale of tragic irony."

Abbey Konowitch, vice president of MCA Records, remarked to trades on the album's timing:

It's so unfortunate that Brad isn't here to see the way his music is being appreciated and accepted by the public. This is a very significant album in a significant time in music, and we're fortunate to have this music, though we're very unfortunate to not have one of the artists around that created it.

Eric Wilson, the band's bassist, was "more pragmatic about the issue":

We just want the album to do well so that Brad's kid can go to a good school, and so that we can continue [to make a] living.

== Commercial performance ==
By October 1996, the disc had moved 145,000 units; its success led to renewed interest in the band's back catalog, which experienced marked growth. By April 1997, the album cracked the top 20 of the Billboard 200, and it eventually peaked at position 13. Sixteen months following the album's release, it still sold 40,000 albums per week. It eventually spent 208 weeks on the chart. By April 2024, it had sold nearly 7 million copies in the United States, according to Luminate Data. On the album's 30th anniversary, it was certified Diamond by RIAA for selling ten million copies.

== Reception and legacy ==
Professional ratings
Review scores
| Source | Rating |
|---|---|
| AllMusic | 4.5/5 stars |
| Encyclopedia of Popular Music | 4/5 stars |
| Entertainment Weekly | B |
| Los Angeles Times | 3.5/4 stars |
| Rolling Stone | 4.5/5 stars |
| The Rolling Stone Album Guide | 4.5/5 stars |
| USA Today | 3/4 stars |
| The Village Voice | A− |

David Fricke of Rolling Stone complimented the band's "bright, wired bounce and the shell-game shuffle of funk beats, snappy Jamaican rhythms and mosh-pit, shout-it-out choruses in Nowell's writing," deeming it "the stuff of a band with great promise and the confidence to make good on it. If only that were still possible." RJ Smith of Spin praised Nowell's songwriting craft, writing, "It might seem a daring experiment if it hadn't so effortlessly sprung from a Long Beach surf scene that featured acoustic jams on the beach that naturally flowed from Wailers to Descendents classics [...] Sublime succeeds not just on vibe but on songcraft." Nisid Hajari of Entertainment Weekly called the album a "respectable testament" to Nowell's memory, ultimately noting that the record "coheres more on an intellectual rather than emotional level, its sound too diffuse to be dramatic." Robert Christgau of The Village Voice gave the record an A−, commenting, "Junkies who retain enough soul to create music at all are generally driven to put their brilliance and stupidity in your face. Nowell is altogether more loving, unassuming, good-humored, and down-to-earth — or so he pretends, which when you're good is all it takes."

Stephen Thomas Erlewine of AllMusic reports that Nowell's death allowed the album to be "slightly overrated in some critical quarters". His critical review deems the album engaging and a demonstration of their potential, but also at times meandering: "The low moments don't arrive that often — by and large, the album is quite engaging — but they happen frequently enough to make the record a demonstration of the band's blossoming ability, but not the fulfillment of their full potential."

=== Accolades ===
Spin included the album on its list of the best albums of the decade, opining that it "redeemed" modern rock radio in the post-grunge era. It deems Sublime "a tragic contradiction: a confident, clearheaded work by an artist coming into his own and at the same time losing control."

| Year | Publication | Rank | Country | List |
|---|---|---|---|---|
| 1997 | Spin | 8 | United States | The 20 Best Albums of '96 |
| 1999 | Spin | 48 | United States | The 90 Greatest Albums of the '90s |
| 1999 | Rolling Stone | * | United States | The Essential Recordings of the 90's |
| 2011 | Rolling Stone | 25 | United States | 100 Best Albums of the Nineties |
| 2026 | Consequence | 20 | United States | 60 Best Albums of 1996 |

== Track listing ==
All tracks are written by Bradley Nowell, Eric Wilson, and Bud Gaugh, except where noted. All tracks produced by Paul Leary, except where noted.

Sublime track listing
| No. | Title | Writer(s) | Producer(s) | Length |
|---|---|---|---|---|
| 1. | "Garden Grove" | Bradley Nowell; Eric Wilson; Bud Gaugh; Linton Kwesi Johnson | | 4:22 |
| 2. | "What I Got" | Nowell; Wilson; Gaugh; Lindon Andrew Roberts | David Kahne | 2:51 |
| 3. | "Wrong Way" | | | 2:16 |
| 4. | "Same in the End" | | | 2:36 |
| 5. | "April 29, 1992 (Miami)" | Nowell; Laurence Parker; Marshall Goodman; Michael Happoldt | Kahne | 3:53 |
| 6. | "Santeria" | | | 3:03 |
| 7. | "Seed" | | | 2:10 |
| 8. | "Jailhouse" | | | 4:53 |
| 9. | "Pawn Shop" | Nowell; Wilson; Gaugh; Lloyd Mcdonald; Winston Matthews | | 6:06 |
| 10. | "Paddle Out" | | Nowell; Miguel | 1:15 |
| 11. | "The Ballad of Johnny Butt" | Kevin Roach; Mike Davis; Rick Selga | | 2:11 |
| 12. | "Burritos" | | | 3:55 |
| 13. | "Under My Voodoo" | | | 3:25 |
| 14. | "Get Ready" | Nowell; Wilson; Gaugh; Parker | | 4:50 |
| 15. | "Caress Me Down" | | Kahne | 3:31 |
| 16. | "What I Got" (Reprise) | Nowell; Wilson; Gaugh; Roberts | | 3:01 |
| 17. | "Doin' Time" | Nowell; Goodman; George Gershwin; Ira Gershwin; Dorothy Heyward; DuBose Heyward; Adam Keefe Horovitz; Adam Yauch; Rick Rubin | Kahne | 4:14 |
| Total length: | | | | 58:31 |

10th anniversary deluxe edition – Disc 1
| No. | Title | Length |
|---|---|---|
| 1. | "Trenchtown Rock" (Bob Marley) | 1:41 |
| 2. | "Doin' Time" (original mix) | 4:12 |
| 3. | "Wrong Way" | 2:16 |
| 4. | "Paddle Out" | 1:15 |
| 5. | "What I Got" | 2:51 |
| 6. | "Pawn Shop" | 6:06 |
| 7. | "April 29th, 1992 (Miami)" | 3:53 |
| 8. | "Santeria" | 3:03 |
| 9. | "Seed" | 2:10 |
| 10. | "Jailhouse" | 4:53 |
| 11. | "Caress Me Down" | 3:31 |
| 12. | "The Ballad of Johnny Butt" | 2:11 |
| 13. | "Under My Voodoo" | 3:25 |
| 14. | "Burritos" | 3:55 |
| 15. | "Same in the End" | 2:36 |
| 16. | "Get Ready" | 4:51 |
| 17. | "What I Got (Reprise)" | 3:01 |
| 18. | "Garden Grove" | 4:21 |

10th anniversary deluxe edition – Disc 2
| No. | Title | Length |
|---|---|---|
| 1. | "I Love My Dog" | 4:19 |
| 2. | "Superstar Punani" | 3:16 |
| 3. | "April 29th, 1992 (Miami)" (alternate version) | 3:46 |
| 4. | "Saw Red" (acoustic version) | 2:38 |
| 5. | "Little District" (acoustic version) | 1:56 |
| 6. | "Zimbabwe" (acoustic version) | 2:42 |
| 7. | "What I Got" (alternate version) | 2:39 |
| 8. | "Doin' Time" (uptown dub) | 3:47 |
| 9. | "Doin' Time" (Eerie Splendor remix) | 5:15 |
| 10. | "Doin' Time" (remix by Wyclef Jean) | 3:52 |
| 11. | "Doin' Time" (remixed by Marshall Arts featuring The Pharcyde) | 4:11 |
| 12. | "Doin' Time" (Marshall Arts instrumental version) | 4:11 |
| 13. | "April 29th, 1992 (Miami)" (instrumental version) | 3:55 |
| 14. | "Caress Me Down" (instrumental version) | 3:32 |
| 15. | "What I Got" (instrumental version) | 2:53 |

== Personnel ==
Credits adapted from Tidal.

Sublime

- Bradley Nowell – lead vocals, guitar, synthesizer
- Eric Wilson – bass, backing vocals, synthesizer
- Bud Gaugh – drums, synthesizer

=== Additional personnel ===
- Marshall Goodman – turntables, percussion, drums, drum programming
- Michael "Miguel" Happoldt – guitar, space echo
- David Kahne – organ, piano
- Paul Leary – guitar
- Todd Forman – saxophone
- Jon Blondell – trombone

=== Production ===
- Producers: Paul Leary, David Kahne
- Engineers: Stuart Sullivan, Eddie Ashworth
- Mastering: Brian Gardner
- Artwork: Opie Ortiz
- Photos: Josh Coffman, John Dunne, Zach Fischel

== Charts and certifications ==
=== Weekly charts ===
Weekly chart performance for Sublime
| Chart (1996–2024) | Peak position |
|---|---|
| Greek Albums (IFPI) | 1 |
| New Zealand Albums (RMNZ) | 6 |
| US Billboard 200 | 13 |
| US Top Catalog Albums (Billboard) | 5 |
| US Top Rock Albums (Billboard) | 17 |

=== Year-end charts ===
Year-end chart performance for Sublime
| Chart (1996) | Position |
|---|---|
| US Billboard 200 | 188 |

| Chart (1997) | Position |
|---|---|
| Canadian Hard Rock Albums (Nielsen Soundscan) | 22 |
| New Zealand Albums (RMNZ) | 33 |
| US Billboard 200 | 18 |

| Chart (1998) | Position |
|---|---|
| New Zealand Albums (RMNZ) | 18 |
| US Billboard 200 | 100 |

| Chart (2002) | Position |
|---|---|
| Canadian Alternative Albums (Nielsen SoundScan) | 106 |
| Canadian Metal Albums (Nielsen SoundScan) | 50 |

| Chart (2019) | Position |
|---|---|
| US Top Rock Albums (Billboard) | 44 |

| Chart (2020) | Position |
|---|---|
| US Top Rock Albums (Billboard) | 33 |

| Chart (2021) | Position |
|---|---|
| US Top Rock Albums (Billboard) | 36 |

| Chart (2024) | Position |
|---|---|
| US Billboard 200 | 197 |

=== Certifications ===
Certifications for Sublime
| Region | Certification | Certified units/sales |
|---|---|---|
| Canada (Music Canada) | Gold | 50,000^{^} |
| New Zealand (RMNZ) | 5× Platinum | 75,000^{^} |
| United States (RIAA) | Diamond | 10,000,000^{‡} |
| United States (RIAA) Video | Gold | 50,000^{^} |
^{^} Shipments figures based on certification alone.^{‡} Sales+streaming figures based on certification alone.
