= What I Got =

1996 single by Sublime

Single by Sublime

from the album Sublime
- B-side: "Saw Red"; "Jailhouse" (live); "Rivers of Babylon"; "All You Need"
- Released: July 23, 1996
- Studio: Pedernales (Austin, Texas); Total Access Recording (Redondo Beach, California)
- Genre: Alternative rock
- Length: 2:51; 3:03 (reprise)
- Label: Gasoline Alley; MCA
- Songwriters: Bradley Nowell; Eric Wilson; Floyd Gaugh IV; Lindon Roberts
- Producer: David Kahne

Sublime singles chronology
| "Badfish" (1993) | "What I Got" (1996) | "Santeria" (1997) |

Music video
- "What I Got" on YouTube

"What I Got" is a song from American band Sublime's self-titled third album (1996). It was released to modern rock and college radio on July 23, 1996. The song's chorus is a lift from "Loving" by reggae artist Half Pint, who is credited as a co-writer. The melody and pacing of the verses is identical to the Beatles' "Lady Madonna". It was released after singer Bradley Nowell's death in 1996 from a heroin overdose and became one of the band's biggest radio hits.

"What I Got" reached the number-one spot on the US Billboard Modern Rock Tracks chart and was also a mainstream radio hit, peaking at number 29 on the Billboard Hot 100 Airplay chart. In New Zealand, "What I Got" peaked at number 34 on the RIANZ Singles Chart; What I Got: The Seven Song EP charted higher, reaching number 33 on the same chart. Elsewhere, the single reached number two on the Canadian RPM Alternative 30 chart and number 19 in Iceland. Rolling Stone placed it at number 83 on its list of the "100 Greatest Guitar Songs of All Time" in 2008.

== Music video ==
The video for "What I Got", shot after Bradley Nowell's death, mainly contains a collage of archive videos and photos of him including his infant son Jakob Nowell at the end, as a tribute to the singer. The video includes images of Long Beach, California, where Sublime met their success, as well as live footage from a Sublime show at The Capitol Ballroom in Washington, D.C.

== Track listings ==
Australian and European CD single

1. "What I Got" – 2:51
2. "Saw Red" – 1:57
3. "Jailhouse" (live) – 4:40
4. "What I Got" (demo version) – 2:39

UK CD single

1. "What I Got" (Super No Mofo edit) – 2:51
2. "Rivers of Babylon" – 2:29
3. "All You Need" – 2:45
4. "What I Got" (reprise) – 3:02

UK 7-inch single

A. "What I Got" (Super No Mofo edit) – 2:51
B. "Rivers of Babylon" – 2:29

What I Got: The Seven Song EP

1. "What I Got" (Kahne radio edit) – 2:48
2. "40 oz. to Freedom" – 3:18
3. "D.J.s" – 3:05
4. "All You Need" – 2:45
5. "Same in the End" – 2:38
6. "Work That We Do" – 2:37
7. "Doin' Time" (Marshall Arts Remix featuring The Pharcyde) – 4:12

== Charts ==
=== Weekly charts ===
| Chart (1996–1997) | Peak position |
|---|---|
| Canada Rock/Alternative (RPM) | 2 |
| Iceland (Íslenski Listinn Topp 40) | 19 |
| New Zealand (Recorded Music NZ) | 34 |
| New Zealand (Recorded Music NZ) What I Got: The Seven Song EP | 33 |
| Scottish Singles Sales (Official Charts) | 76 |
| UK Singles (Official Charts) | 71 |
| US Radio Songs (Billboard) | 29 |
| US Adult Pop Airplay (Billboard) | 39 |
| US Alternative Airplay (Billboard) | 1 |
| US Mainstream Rock Airplay (Billboard) | 11 |

=== Year-end charts ===
| Chart (1996) | Position |
|---|---|
| Canada Rock/Alternative (RPM) | 21 |
| US Modern Rock Tracks (Billboard) | 28 |

| Chart (1997) | Position |
|---|---|
| US Mainstream Rock Tracks (Billboard) | 46 |
| US Modern Rock Tracks (Billboard) | 50 |

== Certifications ==
| Region | Certification | Certified units/sales |
|---|---|---|
| New Zealand (RMNZ) | 4× Platinum | 120,000^{‡} |
^{‡} Sales+streaming figures based on certification alone.

== Release history ==
| Region | Date | Format(s) | Label(s) | Ref. |
|---|---|---|---|---|
| United States | July 23, 1996 | Modern rock; college radio | Gasoline Alley; MCA | |
| United States | September 24, 1996 | Contemporary hit radio | Gasoline Alley; MCA | |
| United Kingdom | June 16, 1997 | 7-inch vinyl; CD; cassette | Gasoline Alley; MCA | |
