= Santeria (song) =

- US promotional single

Single by Sublime

from the album Sublime
- Released: January 7, 1997
- Recorded: 1996
- Studio: Pedernales Studio (Austin, TX)
- Genre: Ska; reggae; reggae rock
- Length: 3:03
- Label: MCA
- Songwriters: Bradley Nowell; Eric Wilson; Bud Gaugh
- Producer: Paul Leary

Sublime singles chronology
| "What I Got" (1996) | "Santeria" (1997) | "Wrong Way" (1997) |

Music video
- "Santeria" on YouTube

"Santeria" is a song by American ska punk band Sublime, released on their third album Sublime (1996). A ballad, it was released as a single on January 7, 1997. Although the song was released after the death of lead singer Bradley Nowell, "Santeria" along with "What I Got" are often regarded as the band's signature songs.

== Composition and lyrics ==
"Santeria" recycles the bassline and guitar riff from Sublime's earlier song "Lincoln Highway Dub" off their second studio album, Robbin' the Hood (1994).

The song begins with the narrator stating that he does not practice Santeria, an Afro-Cuban religion. He tells the story of a jealous ex-boyfriend who is planning to take revenge on the man who stole his girlfriend and hit her too. The man then decides to find a new girlfriend, but expresses his desire to use violence as he describes his plans to "pop a cap in Sancho" and "stick that barrel straight down Sancho's throat" if he ever sees him again, and that "he best go run and hide". The lead singer of Sublime, Bradley Nowell, refers to the man as "Sancho" and his ex-girlfriend as "Heina". In Chicano culture, a man who steals another man's girlfriend is often referred to as "Sancho" while a man's woman or girlfriend is referred to as "Heina", which is adapted from the word reina, meaning "queen" in Spanish.

"Santeria" was described by The A.V. Club as "a blue-beat reggae song on its surface and a classic country song in essence." In this context, "blue-beat" refers to the early Jamaican pop and ska style produced by Blue Beat Records. Consequence magazine wrote that the song was "the band's reggae-tinged ska hit," while Forbes called it a "throwback reggae rock hit."

== Music video ==
A music video was filmed after the death of lead singer Bradley Nowell, who makes a cameo via stock footage. During the video, Nowell's beloved Lou Dog is seen along with the other members of Sublime remembering him. The video is a visualization of the story told in the song in the form of a Western, and features Tom Lister, Jr. as Sancho and Nowell's widow Troy as La Heina. Lister was bitten by Lou Dog on the lip in a particular scene where he gets too close to Lou Dog's face.

== Commercial performance ==
"Santeria" was a moderate U.S. crossover hit, selling over 5 million copies and cracking the Top 5 on Billboard's Modern Rock Tracks chart as well as reaching number 43 on the Hot 100 Airplay chart.

== Media usage ==
The song is a playable track on the 2008 video game Guitar Hero World Tour, and was released as a downloadable song for Rock Band 3 in 2012 as well as Rocksmith 2014 in 2014. The song was featured in the films Idle Hands, Knocked Up, Remember the Daze, This is 40 and the remake of White Men Can't Jump. The song is also on the video game Fortnite Festival.

== Charts ==
| Chart (1997) | Peak position |
|---|---|
| Canada Top Singles (RPM) | 90 |
| US Radio Songs (Billboard) | 43 |
| US Alternative Airplay (Billboard) | 3 |
| US Adult Pop Airplay (Billboard) | 38 |

== Certifications ==
| Region | Certification | Certified units/sales |
|---|---|---|
| Brazil (Pro-Música Brasil) | Gold | 30,000^{‡} |
| New Zealand (RMNZ) | 8× Platinum | 240,000^{‡} |
| United Kingdom (BPI) | Silver | 200,000^{‡} |
^{‡} Sales+streaming figures based on certification alone.
