= Wrong Way =

Single by Sublime

from the album Sublime
- Released: May 25, 1997
- Recorded: 1996
- Genre: Ska punk
- Length: 2:16
- Label: MCA
- Songwriters: Bud Gaugh; Bradley Nowell; Eric Wilson
- Producers: Paul Leary; David Kahne

Sublime singles chronology
"Santeria" (1997)	"Wrong Way" (1997)	"Doin' Time" (1997)

"Wrong Way" is a song by American band Sublime, released on May 25, 1997 as the third single from their third album Sublime (1996). The song fits squarely within the punk rock-inspired third wave ska movement of the 1990s. The song reached number 47 on the Billboard Hot 100 Airplay chart, spending 26 weeks on the chart, and peaked at number three on Billboard's Alternative Songs chart.

== Composition ==
The trombone solo, played by Jon Blondell, contains an interpolation of the theme from George Gershwin's "Rhapsody in Blue".

The version of the song played on the radio typically edits a use of the word "tits" but does not remove it entirely, instead simply lowering the "I" sound so that what is being said is slightly less obvious.

== Music video ==
A music video was directed by Gregory Dark, starring Bijou Phillips, soon after the band's lead singer, Bradley Nowell, had died. The video has a cameo by Mike Watt of the bands Minutemen, Firehose, and Dos; he was one of the biggest influences on bass guitar player Eric Wilson. The pornography producer Maestro Claudio plays the clown/dad. The video also includes a brief cameo by Fishbone lead singer, Angelo Moore, as well as members of Skunk Records band the Ziggens.

== Charts ==
Chart (1997)	Peak position
US Radio Songs (Billboard)	47
US Alternative Airplay (Billboard)	3

== Certification ==
Region	Certification	Certified units/sales
New Zealand (RMNZ)	2× Platinum	60,000^{‡}
^{‡} Sales+streaming figures based on certification alone.
