= Sublime (band) =

American rock band

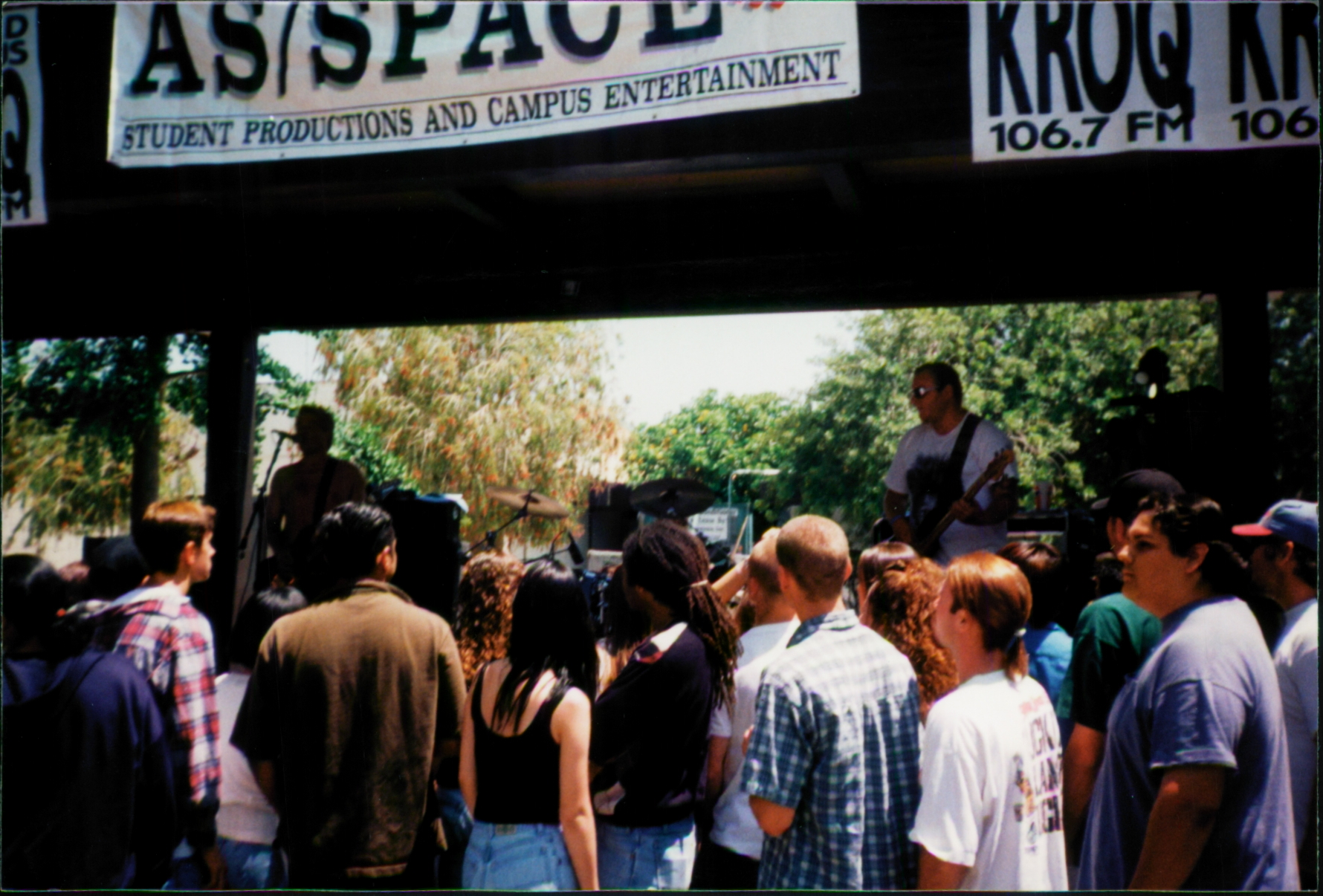
- Sublime (from left: Bradley Nowell, Bud Gaugh, and Eric Wilson) performing at California State University, Northridge

Background information
- Origin: Long Beach, California, U.S.
- Genres: Ska punk; reggae rock
- Years active: 1988–1996; 2023–present
- Labels: MCA; Skunk; Gasoline Alley; Atlantic
- Spinoffs: Eyes Adrift; Long Beach Dub Allstars; Long Beach Shortbus; Sublime with Rome
- Members: Eric Wilson; Bud Gaugh; Jakob Nowell
- Past members: Bradley Nowell
- Website: sublimelbc.com

Sublime is an American rock band from Long Beach, California, founded in 1988. The band's original lineup consisted of Bradley Nowell (vocals and guitar), Eric Wilson (bass), and Bud Gaugh (drums), with Nowell's Dalmatian, Lou Dog, serving as the band's mascot. Nowell died of a heroin overdose in May 1996, resulting in the band's breakup.

Sublime has released four studio albums, one live album, five compilation albums, three EPs, and one box set. Although their first two studio albums—40oz. to Freedom (1992) and Robbin' the Hood (1994)—achieved modest commercial success in the United States, the band did not experience mainstream breakthrough until their self-titled third album, released two months after Nowell's death. Peaking at No. 13 on the Billboard 200 and later certified Diamond, the album spawned the hit singles "What I Got" and "Santeria"—both of which topped the Billboard Modern Rock Tracks chart—alongside U.S. radio staples such as "Wrong Way", "Doin' Time", and "April 29, 1992 (Miami)". By 2009, the band had sold over 17 million albums worldwide, including approximately 10 million in the United States. Frequent collaborators Michael "Miguel" Happoldt and Marshall "Ras MG" Goodman also contributed to multiple Sublime recordings.

In 2009, Wilson and Gaugh attempted to reform the band with California-based singer and guitarist Rome Ramirez. Shortly after performing at Cypress Hill's Smokeout Festival, a Los Angeles judge barred the lineup from performing under the Sublime name without permission from Nowell's estate, which holds the trademark rights. Wilson, Gaugh, and Ramirez subsequently renamed the project Sublime with Rome and released three studio albums, though Gaugh departed shortly after their 2011 debut, Yours Truly. Sublime with Rome remained active until 2024.

In 2023, Wilson and Gaugh officially reunited under the Sublime name with Nowell's son, Jakob Nowell, taking over on vocals and guitar. This lineup recorded the band's fourth studio album, Until the Sun Explodes (2026), which Jakob Nowell stated may be his only album with the group.

== History ==
=== 1988–1991: Formation and Jah Won't Pay the Bills ===
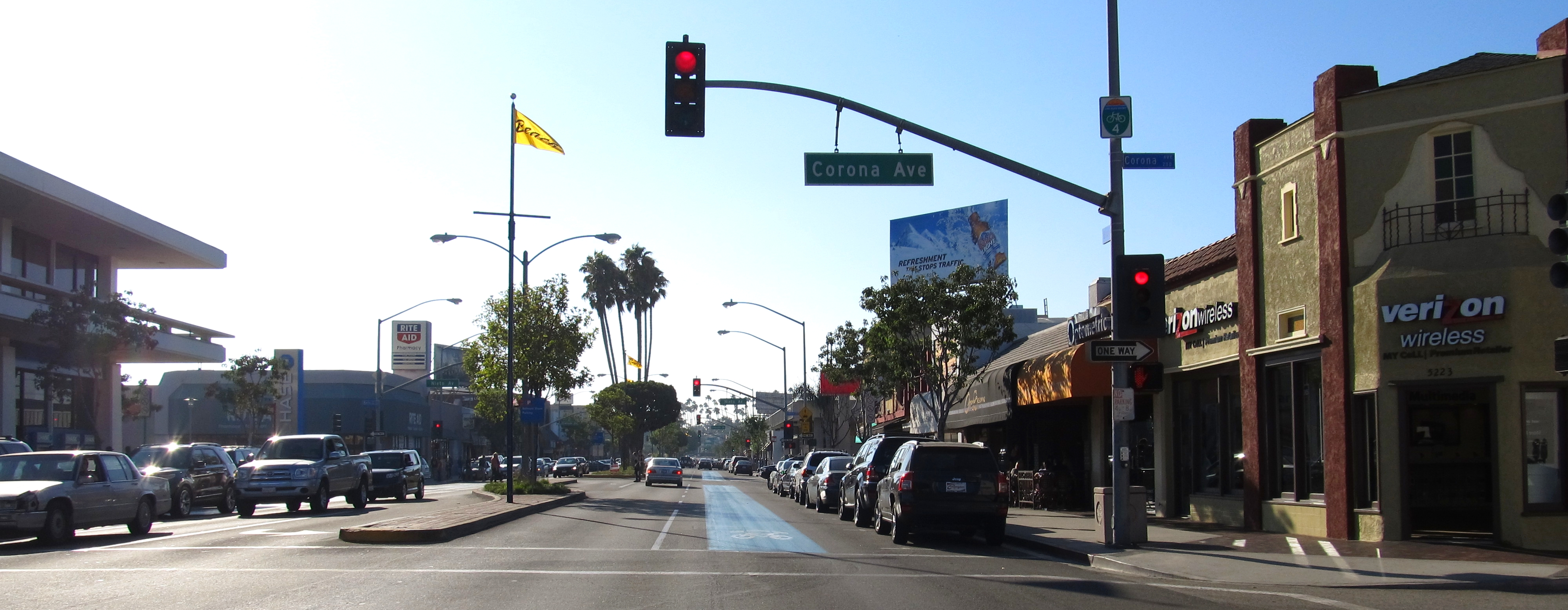
Belmont Shore in Long Beach, California, where Sublime played its first public show on July 4, 1988

Eric Wilson and Bud Gaugh were childhood friends who grew up in the same Long Beach, California, neighborhood, where Wilson's father, Billy Wilson, taught Gaugh how to read music and play the drums. During their high school years, Gaugh and Wilson formed a three-piece punk band called the Juice Bros alongside future manager Michael Happoldt. Around this time, Bradley Nowell—who had recently dropped out of the University of California, Santa Cruz—joined the group and introduced Gaugh and Wilson, who previously listened almost exclusively to punk rock, to reggae and ska.

Sublime played its first public show on July 4, 1988, on the Long Beach Peninsula in Belmont Shore. Because local venues were initially skeptical of the trio's genre fusion and hesitant to book them, the band established its own independent label, Skunk Records, presenting themselves to club promoters as "Skunk Records recording artists" to build credibility and secure performances. Over the next several years, Sublime performed at house parties and small venues across Southern California alongside local ska and punk acts such as No Doubt, the Skeletones, and the Smokestacks. Among their regular early haunts in 1990 and 1991 was Toe Jam, a downtown Long Beach club operated by David Rice, James Walker, Jason Burch, and Jeff King, whom the band later thanked on the back cover of 40oz. to Freedom.

In February 1990, Nowell adopted an abused Dalmatian puppy from a shelter and named him "Louie" after his grandfather. Known as Louie Nowell, King Louie, or "Lou Dog", the dog became the band's mascot and frequently wandered onstage during live performances.

In late 1990, Happoldt—then a music student at California State University, Dominguez Hills—offered the trio after-hours access to his university's recording studio. The band sneaked into the facility at night, recording between midnight and 7:00 a.m. These sessions produced the cassette Jah Won't Pay the Bills, released in 1991 on Skunk Records. Featuring early versions of songs that later appeared on their studio albums, the tape helped Sublime build a grassroots following throughout Southern California.

=== 1992–1995: 40oz. to Freedom, Robbin' the Hood, and Warped Tour ===
Sublime built a dedicated following across California through relentless live performances before releasing its debut studio album, 40oz. to Freedom, in 1992 on Skunk Records Blending ska, reggae, punk, surf rock, and hip hop, the album was initially sold exclusively out of the band's van and at live shows. It gained widespread traction across the Greater Los Angeles area after alternative rock radio station KROQ added the single "Date Rape" to heavy rotation. By October 1996, 40oz. to Freedom had sold more than 209,000 copies—outpacing the early sales of the band's self-titled third album—and was later certified double platinum by the Recording Industry Association of America (RIAA).

Between 1992 and 1993, Sublime was briefly signed to Danny Holloway's True Sound imprint before returning to Skunk Records. In June 1994, Jon Phillips—who subsequently became the band's manager—signed Sublime to Gasoline Alley, a subsidiary of MCA Records. That year, the band released its second studio album, Robbin' the Hood, an experimental collection combining rock, hip hop, spoken-word segments, and four-track acoustic home recordings. Although Robbin' the Hood was not an immediate commercial success, Sublime toured extensively throughout 1994 and 1995, expanding its audience beyond the West Coast as "Date Rape" gained national radio airplay.

In 1995, Sublime co-headlined the inaugural nationwide Vans Warped Tour. During the tour, the band was temporarily suspended for a week due to unruly behavior by members of its entourage and after Lou Dog bit four attendees. Drummer Bud Gaugh later recalled the experience: "Basically, our daily regimen was wake up, drink, drink more, play, and then drink a lot more. We'd call people names. Nobody got our sense of humor. Then we brought the dog out and he bit a few skaters, and that was the last straw." Following the Warped Tour and the subsequent Three Ring Circus Tour, the label pressured the trio to record a commercial follow-up to Robbin' the Hood.

=== 1996: Sublime, Bradley Nowell's death, and disbandment ===
In early 1996, Sublime headlined the inaugural SnoCore Tour. That February, the band began recording its self-titled third studio album—and major-label debut—at Pedernales Studio in Austin, Texas, with producer Paul Leary. The band completed the album before Nowell died of a heroin overdose on May 25, 1996, at the Ocean View Motel in San Francisco, California, one day after performing their final show in Petaluma, California, and two months before the album's release. Found by drummer Bud Gaugh shortly before noon, Nowell was 28 years old.

Many listeners were unaware of Nowell's death when Sublime became a commercial breakthrough upon its July 1996 release, propelled by the lead single "What I Got", which reached number one on the Billboard Modern Rock Tracks chart. The album earned the band international recognition and was certified Diamond by the Recording Industry Association of America (RIAA) in July 2026. Alongside "What I Got", the record spawned several posthumous radio hits, including "Santeria", "Doin' Time", "Wrong Way", and "April 29, 1992 (Miami)".

Following Nowell's death, Sublime's co-manager Jason Westfall stated that the surviving members would not continue performing or recording under the Sublime name, remarking, "Just like Nirvana, Sublime died when Brad died."

=== 1997–2023: Posthumous releases and side projects ===
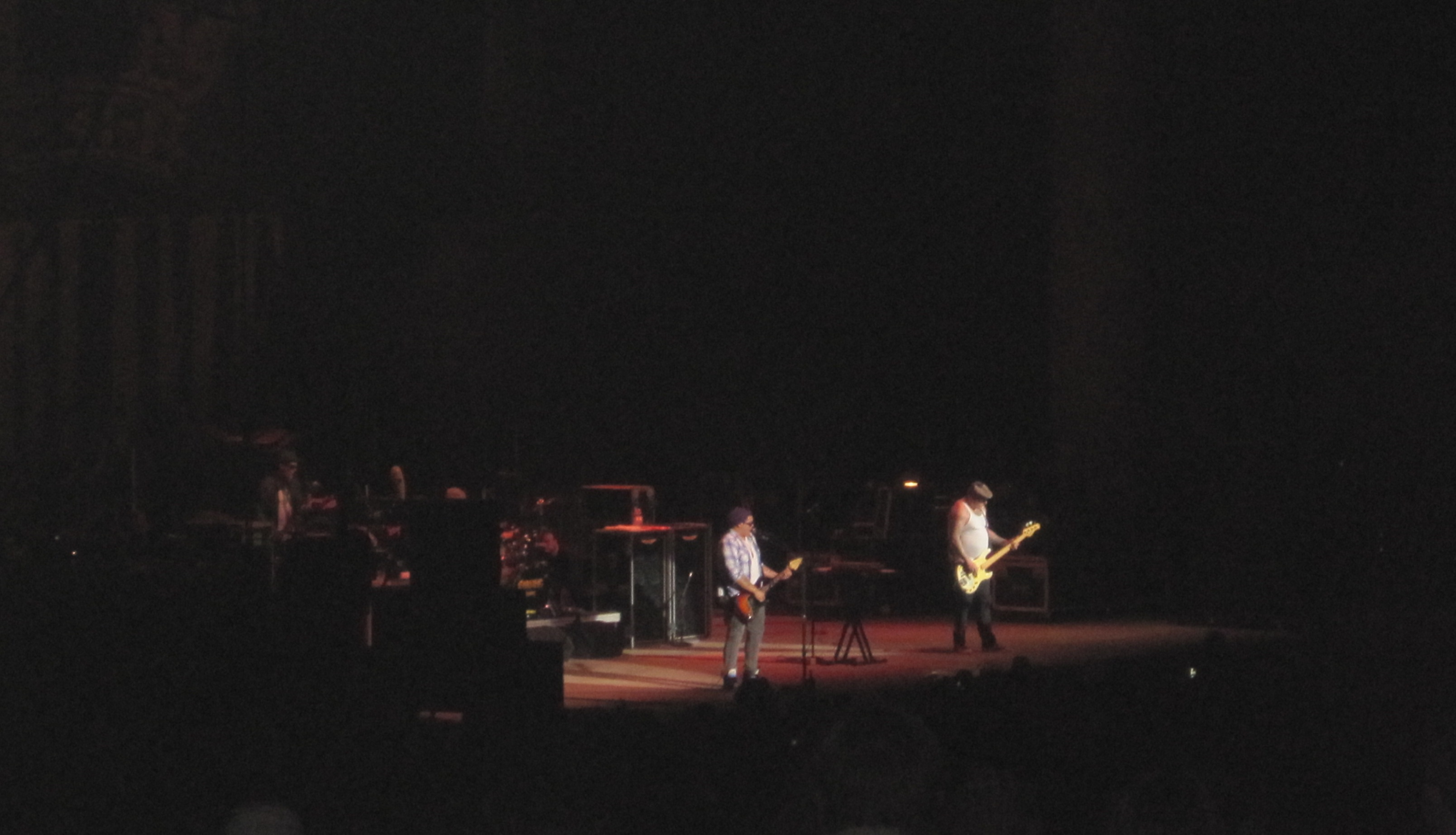
Sublime performing with Rome Ramirez in Sublime with Rome in September 2010

Following Nowell's death, several posthumous albums were issued, including Second-Hand Smoke in 1997 and both Stand by Your Van and Sublime Acoustic: Bradley Nowell & Friends in 1998. Produced by Michael "Miguel" Happoldt, Second-Hand Smoke was described by critic J. D. Considine as an "assemblage of leftovers, remixes and rarities" suggesting potential musical directions Sublime might have explored had Nowell survived. With the release of Greatest Hits in 1999, the band had issued as many albums posthumously as during Nowell's lifetime. A three-CD and DVD box set of demos, rarities, and live recordings titled Everything Under the Sun followed on November 14, 2006, alongside vinyl picture disc reissues of 40oz. to Freedom, Second-Hand Smoke, and Stand by Your Van.

Nowell's widow, Troy Holmes Nowell, entered negotiations with the band's record label and producer Paul Ruffino to develop a documentary film chronicling Sublime's career, though production was delayed while Nowell's estate underwent legal settlement. In October 1997, Troy Nowell and musician Courtney Love partnered with the Partnership for a Drug-Free America on a series of televised public service announcements aimed at deglamorizing heroin use within the music industry.

After Sublime disbanded, Wilson and Gaugh formed the Long Beach Dub Allstars in 1997 with frequent Sublime collaborators Michael "Miguel" Happoldt, Marshall Goodman ("Ras MG"), and saxophonist Todd Forman. Their debut concert was a April 20 cannabis benefit show at Maritime Hall in San Francisco—the venue where Sublime had been scheduled to perform the night Nowell died—which drew 3,000 attendees and helped popularize 4/20 as an annual observance. The Long Beach Dub Allstars broke up in 2002 after internal disputes over members breaking a sobriety pledge.

Following the group's split, Gaugh joined the supergroup Eyes Adrift alongside former Nirvana bassist Krist Novoselic and Meat Puppets frontman Curt Kirkwood. Eyes Adrift released its sole, self-titled 12-track studio album on September 24, 2002, supported by the single "Alaska".

In 2005, No Doubt bassist Tony Kanal reflected on Sublime's influence, stating, "They made a sound that somehow fused rock, reggae, punk and hip-hop in a way that was seamless and credible, bound together by the undeniable soul of Brad Nowell's voice." Kanal joined fellow Southern California and touring peers—including Pennywise, Mike Watt, G. Love, Jack Johnson, Ozomatli, Michael Franti, and Gift of Gab—on the 2005 benefit compilation Look at All the Love We Found: A Tribute to Sublime, which raised funds for musicians struggling with substance abuse.

On June 18, 2013, to mark the 25th anniversary of Sublime's first public performance, the band released its first official live album and concert film, 3 Ring Circus - Live at The Palace, recorded during a 1995 show in Hollywood; the deluxe edition also included a concert film recorded in 1995 at the Las Palmas Theatre.

In 2021, Sublime issued the dub remix project Sublime Meets Scientist & Mad Professor Inna L.B.C., featuring remixes of classic Sublime tracks by dub producers Scientist and Mad Professor with cover artwork by Tony McDermott. Initially released on June 12, 2021, as a limited-edition yellow vinyl LP for Record Store Day via Geffen Records, it was later issued on CD and digital platforms with two bonus dub mixes: "Garden Grove Vocal Dub (Scientist Mix)" and "Hong Kong Phooey Dub (Mad Professor Mix)". Later that year, on October 1, 2021, a 25th-anniversary limited-edition cassette of Sublime was released.

On April 21, 2023—one day after 4/20—Surfdog Records released the archival live album $5 at the Door: Live at Tressel Tavern, 1994, recorded in Everett, Washington and previously circulated as the bootleg Memories, alongside the launch of Sublime's licensed cannabis brand, REEFERS.

=== 2023–present: Reunion with Jakob Nowell, festival appearances, and Until the Sun Explodes ===
On December 11, 2023, Wilson and Gaugh reunited onstage with Jakob Nowell—billed as "A special performance by Jakob Nowell, Eric Wilson, and Bud Gaugh"—during a benefit concert for Bad Brains vocalist H.R. at the Teragram Ballroom in Los Angeles. On January 16, 2024, Sublime was officially announced as part of the 2024 Coachella lineup with Jakob Nowell joining as a full-time member, alongside plans for additional festival appearances throughout the year. In May 2024, the reunited lineup released the single "Feel Like That", featuring roots reggae band Stick Figure and incorporating archival vocals from Bradley Nowell. Sublime with Rome disbanded at the end of 2024 following its farewell tour.

In March 2025, Sublime announced that it was recording a new studio album—its first since 1996—with producers Travis Barker and John Feldmann. The band released the lead single, "Ensenada", on July 18, 2025. On March 25, 2026, Sublime announced that its fourth studio album, Until the Sun Explodes, would be released on June 12, 2026, with Jakob Nowell stating that it could be his only album with the group. Following the album's release in June 2026, the band continued performing at major festivals, including Louder Than Life in Louisville, Kentucky, in September 2026.

== Musical style ==
Sublime was one of the most prominent bands of the third wave of ska, specifically characterized as ska punk and reggae rock. The band frequently blended punk rock and hardcore punk with hip hop, heavy metal, dancehall, reggae, ska, funk, and surf music.

Sublime's arrangements were characterized by bass-driven grooves, off-beat reggae rhythms, cadenced vocal phrasing, and abrupt tempo and genre shifts within individual songs—such as alternating between thrash punk, ska, and reggae on "Seed". Their recordings frequently incorporated harmonic minor- and blues-inflected guitar solos, improvised dub basslines, turntable scratching, and rolling drum fills.

=== Influences ===
Bob Marley and the Wailers, alongside Peter Tosh, were foundational influences on Sublime's songwriting, as were Jamaican reggae and dancehall artists including Born Jamericans, Toots & the Maytals (whose "54-46 That's My Number" Sublime adapted), the Melodians (whose "Rivers of Babylon" they covered), Wayne Smith, Tenor Saw, Frankie Paul, the Wailing Souls, Barrington Levy, Half Pint, and Yellowman. The band also recorded a cover of "Smoke Two Joints", originally written and performed by the Oregon-based reggae group the Toyes.

Sublime drew heavily from 1980s and 1990s East Coast hip hop and West Coast hip hop, sampling, interpolating, or referencing artists such as N.W.A, Beastie Boys, KRS-One, Just-Ice, Public Enemy, Doug E. Fresh, Too $hort, and Mobb Deep, as well as Philadelphia rapper Steady B and Houston hip-hop group Geto Boys.

From the Southern California metal, surf rock, and punk scenes, Sublime cited and sampled acts including Minutemen (whose lyric "punk rock changed our lives" opens 40oz. to Freedom), Descendents (covering "Hope"), Bad Religion (covering "We're Only Gonna Die"), Big Drill Car, the Ziggens, the Bel-Airs, Butthole Surfers, Secret Hate, and Fishbone. They also drew inspiration from Washington, D.C. hardcore bands such as Minor Threat, Fugazi, and Bad Brains, as well as classic rock and pop acts including the Grateful Dead (covering "Scarlet Begonias"), the Doors, Jimi Hendrix, Red Hot Chili Peppers, Frank Zappa, and ABBA. Additionally, the band referenced funk, R&B, and soul performers such as James Brown, the Ohio Players, and Aswad, alongside British and Irish acts including the Boomtown Rats, the Specials, and Primal Scream.

== Legacy ==
Following the mainstream breakthrough of its self-titled third album—which was later certified Diamond by the Recording Industry Association of America (RIAA) and received sustained global radio airplay—Sublime became an influential force in American alternative rock, ska punk, and reggae rock.

Sublime's sound and lyrics are closely associated with the beach and skate cultures of Southern California coastal communities—including Long Beach, Orange County, Venice Beach, and San Diego—as well as Northern California cities such as Eureka. Decades after Nowell's death and the band's initial disbandment, Sublime has retained a large following across North America, particularly in California.

Sublime's recordings have appeared on numerous film, television, and video game soundtracks. Los Angeles alternative rock radio station KROQ ranked Sublime at No. 3 on its annual "Top 106.7 Biggest KROQ Bands of All Time" countdown for six consecutive years, trailing only Red Hot Chili Peppers and Nirvana, and placed the band at No. 81 on its "Top 166 Artists of 1980–2008" list.

With more than 17 million albums sold worldwide, Sublime ranks among the best-selling ska-punk bands in history and has influenced a subsequent generation of reggae-rock and ska-punk artists, including Dirty Heads, Slightly Stoopid, and Ballyhoo!. A long-running tribute band, Badfish—named after Sublime's 1992 song—formed in 2001 and continues to tour nationally.

In 2019, the feature-length documentary Sublime, directed by Bill Guttentag, premiered at the Tribeca Festival to chronicle the band's history and cultural impact. To accompany the documentary, singer-songwriter Lana Del Rey recorded a cover of "Doin' Time" that reached number one on Billboard's Alternative Airplay chart and introduced Sublime's catalog to a younger audience.

== Other projects ==
In March 2017, Sublime partnered with San Diego's AleSmith Brewing Company to launch a Mexican-style lager commemorating the 25th anniversary of 40oz. to Freedom, which quickly expanded into canned distribution across multiple states. The band later collaborated with Z2 Comics in 2021 on the biographical graphic novel Sublime: $5.00 at the Door and partnered with Dixxon Flannel Co. for anniversary merchandise. Additionally, Sony Pictures' 3000 Pictures initiated development on a biographical film about the band, with actor KJ Apa cast to portray Bradley Nowell and Justin Chon attached to direct.

=== Philanthropy ===
In 2017, Bradley Nowell's family established the Nowell Family Foundation to create Bradley's House, a residential recovery facility in Laguna Beach, California aimed at supporting musicians dealing with substance use disorders. The foundation has sustained its efforts through benefit concerts and compilation releases, including the 2020 acoustic tribute album The House That Bradley Built issued via LAW Records.

== Band members ==
=== Current ===
- Eric Wilson – bass, organ, percussion, congas, synthesizer, backing and occasional lead vocals (1988–1996, 2023–present)
- Bud Gaugh – drums, synthesizer, sampler, occasional backing vocals (1988–1996, 2023–2026)
- Jakob Nowell – lead vocals, rhythm guitar (2023–present)

=== Touring ===
- Doug Boyce (DJ Product) – turntables, samples (1993, 2023–present)
- Trey Pangborn – lead guitar (2023–present)

=== Former ===
- Bradley Nowell – lead vocals, guitar, percussion, congas, drum programming, bass, synthesizer, sampler (1988–1996; his death)

=== Additional ===
- Ras MG – drums, turntables, samples (1990–1996)
- Michael Happoldt – manager, guitar, vocals (1990–1996)
- Todd Forman – saxophone (1990–1996)
- Kelly Vargas – drums (1991–1993)
- Christopher Hauser – trumpet (1990–1992)

== Discography ==
- 40oz. to Freedom (1992)
- Robbin' the Hood (1994)
- Sublime (1996)
- Until the Sun Explodes (2026)
