= Doin' Time =

1997 single by Sublime

Single by Sublime

from the album Sublime
- Released: November 25, 1997
- Recorded: 1996
- Genre: Trip hop; reggae
- Length: 4:12
- Label: MCA; Gasoline Alley
- Songwriter: Bradley Nowell
- Producers: David Kahne; Jerry Duplesis

Sublime singles chronology
"Wrong Way" (1997)	"Doin' Time" (1997)	"Feel Like That" (2024)

Music video
- "Doin' Time" on YouTube

"Doin' Time" is a song by American band Sublime, appearing as the closing track on their self-titled third album (1996). The lyrics tell of a cheating girlfriend, whose infidelities and poor treatment of her lover make him feel like he is in prison. It was released as the album's fourth and final single on November 25, 1997; the disc contained alternate versions of the song by Wyclef Jean and the Pharcyde. Additional versions appeared on the post-Bradley Nowell compilation album Second-hand Smoke and several bootlegs, including one with Snoop Dogg.

This song reached number 87 on the Billboard Hot 100 and number 28 on the Modern Rock Tracks chart.

== Composition ==
"Doin' Time" samples jazz flautist Herbie Mann's cover of George Gershwin's "Summertime" from the opera Porgy and Bess. Mann's version is a live bossa nova version from his album Herbie Mann at the Village Gate. The band originally recorded the song with the lyrics "doin' time and the livin's easy". In order to release the song using the Gershwin sample, the band had to agree to use the line "summertime" instead of "doin' time". However, the song was already recorded with the "doin' time" lyric, and lead singer Bradley Nowell had recently died of a heroin overdose. The lyric was re-recorded by Sublime's friend/producer Michael Happoldt singing "summertime". It is this version of the song that appears on Sublime's self-titled album. The melody of the chorus is adopted from Robert Lee's "Sound Boy". Future Long Beach Dub Allstars DJ Marshall Goodman appears on the recording and is mentioned in the lyrics as ‘Ras MG’.

The line "And we can do it like this, in the place to be." is sampled from the Beastie Boys' "Slow and Low" from their 1986 album Licensed to Ill. The song also samples "Jump for Jah" and "Come Now" by Ini Kamoze, "Buffalo Gals" by Malcolm McLaren, and "Holy Thursday" by David Axelrod.

== Re-release ==
The original version of "Doin' Time" with the original, unaltered vocal was released in 2006 on the Deluxe Edition of the band's self-titled Sublime album, as well as the 2-disc 180-gram vinyl "Back To Black 60th Vinyl Anniversary" edition. The deluxe edition also includes 5 remixes of "Doin' Time", and the original music video which features Nowell's beloved Lou Dog in its last appearance before dying of old age on September 17, 2001.

== Track listing ==
1. "Doin' Time" (Bradley Version) – 4:16
2. "Doin' Time" (Remixed by Wyclef Jean) – 3:49
3. "Doin' Time" (Remixed by Marshall Arts featuring The Pharcyde) – 4:10
4. "Doin' Time" (Album Version) – 4:12

== Charts ==
Chart (1997–1998)	Peak position
US Billboard Hot 100	87
US Alternative Airplay (Billboard)	28

== Lana Del Rey version ==
"Doin' Time"

Single by Lana Del Rey

from the album Norman Fucking Rockwell!
- Released: May 17, 2019
- Studio: Gold Tooth (Los Angeles); Sarm (London)
- Genre: Trip hop
- Length: 3:22
- Label: Polydor; Interscope
- Songwriters: Ira Gershwin; Dorothy Heyward; Bradley Nowell; Maggie Plum
- Producers: Andrew Watt; Happy Perez

Lana Del Rey singles chronology
"Hope Is a Dangerous Thing for a Woman Like Me to Have – but I Have It" (2019)	"Doin' Time" (2019)	"The Greatest" (2019)

Music video
- "Doin' Time" on YouTube

On May 7, 2019, American singer Lana Del Rey teased a cover of the song and said it was "coming soon". Del Rey's cover was officially released on May 17, 2019, coinciding with the premiere of a documentary about Sublime at the Tribeca Film Festival. It was released as the fourth single from Del Rey's sixth studio album Norman Fucking Rockwell!. On August 29, 2019, she released a music video for the cover, which referenced the film Attack of the 50 Foot Woman (1958). When asked about covering the song, Del Rey credited the transitioning of and shifts in genres to Sublime, saying the group "made a genre and sound totally their own", adding that because of the indelible "SoCal vibe" the group created, "not a day goes by that [she does not] listen to at least one Sublime song."

=== Critical reception ===
Del Rey's version of "Doin' Time" was met with unanimous acclaim, with music critics as well as Sublime's former bandmates and family offering praise for Del Rey's treatment of the song.

An article from Rolling Stone that described Del Rey's cover as "shimmering" and "glittering" included Sublime drummer Bud Gaugh's personal evaluation of Del Rey's version, wherein Gaugh lauded the incorporation of her well-recognized vocal style into the song and said that the "smoky, sexy, and iconic sound of her voice breathes new life into one of our favorite singles." In an interview published by iHeartRadio, Troy Dendekker, the widow of Sublime frontman Bradley Nowell, likewise praised Del Rey's cover by calling it "magical and haunting" and explained that it was "an honor to have [Del Rey’s] talent complement the Sublime legacy."

Billboard reviewer Gil Kaufman stated that Del Rey "does [the song] justice", particular highlighting how Del Rey incorporated her own "sleepy, intimate vibe over the song's laid-back groove." The Fader's Meaghan Garvey gave a positive review to the song, saying that "the song of the summer is 'Doin' Time' by Sublime, as sung by Lana herself", and opined that "[Del Rey's] version of 'Doin' Time' improves upon the original, with its slinkier arrangement and fluttering bridge". Stereogum's Keely Quinlan gave an overwhelmingly positive review, praising it as a "very, very good" cover and went on to state that Del Rey's "stacked, reverb-soaked vocals fit this vibe expertly, and some additional percussion adds a gorgeous sweetness". Eric Torres of Pitchfork also gave praise to Del Rey's version when he described the cover as "decidedly within Del Rey's wheelhouse" and highlighted the way in which Del Rey "[adapted] Bradley Nowell's expressive rapping into her own blasé drawl".

=== Music video ===
In the video, Del Rey—as an analog of the 50 Foot Woman—appears amid locations across Los Angeles. At the video's beginning, Del Rey is found reclining in an empty channel of the Los Angeles River in a white minidress. She plucks a palm tree out of the ground and walks up a downtown L.A. street with it, then drops it. She then drinks from a water tower (which has disappointingly little water in it, reflecting the lyric that her lover cheats and then there's very little left for her) and checks her makeup in a glass window. She steps over a freeway and goes to Venice Beach, where she walks into the ocean and splashes in the water. This is revealed to be a movie that Lizzy, the old Lana, is watching at the Drive-In. She sees her boyfriend making out with another girl and she doesn't look pleased. After messing with sand, Lana from the movie blows a sandstorm into the audience, then climbs out of the drive-in screen to shake and drop the car her boyfriend and the other girl is in, killing them, exacting revenge on behalf of Lizzy. She and Lizzy give each other a smile, then she climbs back into the movie.

=== Credits and personnel ===
- Lana Del Rey – vocals
- Andrew Watt – production, instrumentation, programming, guitar, mixing
- Happy Perez – production
- Eric Wilson – bass guitar
- Josh Freese – drums
- Bud Gaugh – drums
- Gayle Levant – harp
- Paul LaMalfa – mixing, engineering
- Dave Kutch – mastering

=== Charts ===
==== Weekly charts ====
Chart (2019)	Peak position
Australia Digital Tracks (ARIA)	39
Belgium (Ultratip Bubbling Under Flanders)	14
Belgium (Ultratip Bubbling Under Wallonia)	20
Canada Hot 100 (Billboard)	60
Canada Rock (Billboard)	25
Croatia (HRT)	56
Czech Republic Singles Digital (ČNS IFPI)	91
France (SNEP)	162
Greece (IFPI)	25
Hungary (Single Top 40)	7
Iceland (RÚV)	11
Ireland (IRMA)	51
Lithuania (AGATA)	58
New Zealand Hot Singles (RMNZ)	13
Portugal (AFP)	81
Scottish Singles Sales (Official Charts)	24
Slovakia Singles Digital (ČNS IFPI)	48
Sweden Heatseeker (Sverigetopplistan)	5
Switzerland (Schweizer Hitparade)	70
UK Singles (Official Charts)	42
US Billboard Hot 100	59
US Rock & Alternative Airplay (Billboard)	1
US Rolling Stone Top 100	62

=== Year-end charts ===
Chart (2019)	Position
US Rock Airplay (Billboard)	5
Chart (2020)	Position
US Rock Airplay (Billboard)	32

=== Certifications ===
Region	Certification	Certified units/sales
Australia (ARIA)	Platinum	70,000^{‡}
Brazil (Pro-Música Brasil)	2× Diamond	320,000^{‡}
Canada (Music Canada)	Gold	40,000^{‡}
Denmark (IFPI Danmark)	Gold	45,000^{‡}
Italy (FIMI)	Gold	50,000^{‡}
New Zealand (RMNZ)	Platinum	30,000^{‡}
Poland (ZPAV)	Platinum	50,000^{‡}
Portugal (AFP)	Gold	5,000^{‡}
Spain (Promusicae)	Gold	30,000^{‡}
United Kingdom (BPI)	Platinum	600,000^{‡}
United States (RIAA)	Platinum	1,000,000^{‡}
Streaming
Greece (IFPI Greece)	Gold	1,000,000^{†}
^{‡} Sales+streaming figures based on certification alone.^{†} Streaming-only figures based on certification alone.

=== Awards ===
Year	Awards ceremony	Award	Results	Ref.
2020	MTV Video Music Awards	Best Alternative	Nominated	

=== Release history ===
Region	Date	Format	Label	Ref.
United States	May 17, 2019	Digital download; streaming	Interscope; Polydor	
United States	May 20, 2019	Alternative radio	Interscope; Polydor	
Italy	May 24, 2019	Contemporary hit radio	Universal	
United Kingdom	September 13, 2019	Contemporary hit radio	Polydor	
