= Date Rape (song) =

Single by Sublime

from the album 40 Oz. to Freedom
- Released: May 6, 1991 (original); August 1995 (re-release)
- Recorded: 1991–1992 at Mambo in Long Beach, California
- Genre: Ska punk; frat rock
- Length: 4:32 (Date Rape/Rawhide version); 3:37 (radio edit)
- Label: Gasoline Alley; MCA
- Songwriters: Marshall Goodman; Bradley Nowell
- Producer: Sublime

Sublime singles chronology
"Date Rape" (1991)	"Badfish" (1993)

Audio sample
- file; help

"Date Rape" is a song by American ska punk band Sublime, originally recorded for their 1992 debut album, 40 Oz. to Freedom. It was first released as a single in 1991, but did not become a hit until four years later, when the Los Angeles radio station KROQ began adding it into their playlists and it quickly became one of their most requested songs.

== Lyrics and meaning ==
The song is about a woman who gets date raped by a man who is convicted of the crime and in turn gets anally raped while in prison.

== Background ==
Bradley Nowell explained,

"I've never raped anyone at least as far as I can remember. We were at a party a long time ago and we were all talking about how much date rape sucked. This guy named Stanley was like, "Date rape isn't so bad; if it wasn't for date rape I'd never get laid." Everyone at the party was bummed out about it, but I was cracking up and I wrote a funny song about it."

Although "Date Rape" is one of Sublime's most popular songs, it barely made it on their first CD. Nowell and the other members of the band thought of it as one of their worst songs, often being reluctant to play it during live shows when fans screamed out requests for it.

== Music video ==
Pornographic actor Ron Jeremy cameos in the "Date Rape" music video. Jeremy plays both the judge at the rape trial and the "large inmate" who rapes the man who sexually assaulted the female protagonist of the song.

== Legacy ==
The song was covered by Fishbone (whom Sublime cited as an influence) on both the 2005 Sublime tribute album Look at All the Love We Found and Fishbone's own 2006 album Still Stuck in Your Throat. The cover's video was directed by Renee Tod and Josh Fischel (of the band Bargain Music), the latter of which is the director of the Sublime documentary Stories, Tales, Lies & Exaggerations.

"Date Rape" is also featured in the soundtrack for the video game BMX XXX.
