= Bradley Nowell =

American musician (1968–1996)

- Nowell performing in the mid-1990s

Background information
- Born: Bradley James Nowell; February 22, 1968; Long Beach, California, U.S.
- Died: May 25, 1996 (aged 28) San Francisco, California, U.S.
- Genres: Ska punk; reggae rock; alternative rock; punk rock
- Occupations: Musician; singer; songwriter
- Instruments: Vocals; guitar
- Years active: 1988–1996
- Formerly of: Sublime; Hogan's Heroes

Bradley James Nowell (February 22, 1968 – May 25, 1996) was an American musician and the lead singer of the band Sublime.

Born and raised in Belmont Shore, Long Beach, California, Nowell developed an interest in music at a young age. Nowell formed Sublime with bassist Eric Wilson and drummer Bud Gaugh, whom he had met while attending California State University, Long Beach. During his lifetime, Sublime released the albums 40oz. to Freedom and Robbin' the Hood to critical and commercial success. In 1996, Nowell died of a heroin overdose in a San Francisco hotel while Sublime was on tour.

== Early life ==
Nowell and his sister, Kellie, were born and raised in the Belmont Shore neighborhood of Long Beach, California, to Jim and Nancy Nowell. As a child, he enjoyed surfing and sailing, often participating in boat races. Nowell became a difficult child and was often hyperactive and disruptive; his mother recalled that he was "very emotional, very sensitive, very artistic, but he was needy … He was always testing just to see what he could get away with." Nowell was diagnosed with attention-deficit disorder and prescribed Ritalin, which his widow stated partially led to his drug addiction later in life. After his parents' divorce when he was 10, Nowell's behavior worsened. His mother was originally awarded custody, but found him too difficult to control, and at the age of 10 he moved in full time with his father.

Music was an integral part of Nowell's upbringing on the part of both of his parents. His father, a construction worker, enjoyed playing guitar and exposed him to the music of Jim Croce; his mother taught piano for a living in addition to playing the flute. Both parents helped teach young Nowell to play the guitar. In the summer of 1979, 11-year-old Nowell accompanied his father on a month-long sailing trip in the Virgin Islands, where he was first exposed to reggae music.

By the age of 16, he had started his first band, Hogan's Heroes, with Michael Yates and Eric Wilson. Nowell was described as a "gifted kid without many friends." At first, Wilson did not share Nowell's interest in reggae music. Nowell recalled the experience: "I was trying to get them to do (UB40's version of) 'Cherry Oh Baby,' and it didn't work. They tried, but it just sounded like such garbage. We were horrible." Nowell attended Long Beach Polytechnic High School (where he took advanced courses) and graduated from Woodrow Wilson Classical High School in Long Beach. He attended the University of California, Santa Cruz before transferring to California State University, Long Beach to study finance. He dropped out one semester shy of earning a degree.

== Sublime ==
In 1988, according to a Westwood One interview, which is available on disc three of the Sublime box set, Nowell, bassist Wilson, and drummer Bud Gaugh grouped together to perform small shows at house parties and barbecues. The band was often asked to leave the parties due to excessive noise. Despite their local success, music venues were skeptical of the band's eclectic musical fusion and many refused to book the band. In response, Nowell and Wilson created their own music label, Skunk Records, telling venues they were "Skunk Records recording artists," helping the band seem more accomplished and enabling them to book more shows. The band produced and distributed Sublime's early recordings on the label, later selling demo tapes at shows and local record stores.

In 1990, music student Michael "Miguel" Happoldt offered to let the band record in the studio at the school where he was studying, although without the school's knowledge. The band agreed, then snuck into the school at night, where they recorded from midnight to seven in the morning. That recording session resulted in the cassette tape Jah Won't Pay the Bills, released in 1991. The tape helped the band gain a grassroots following throughout Southern California.

Using the same tactics they used in recording Jah Won't Pay the Bills, the band recorded its debut album 40oz. to Freedom in secrecy at the studios at California State University, Dominguez Hills. Nowell recalled, "You weren't supposed to be in there after 9 p.m., but we'd go in at 9:30 and stay until 5 in the morning. We'd just hide from the security guards. They never knew we were there. We managed to get $30,000 worth of studio time for free". 40oz. to Freedom was released in 1992; 60,000 copies were sold.

"We just kept being punkers and doing it all by ourselves. Now here we are today. We never thought it would be like this. We just thought we'd always be playing backyard parties. A couple of hundred people in Long Beach can claim we played in their back yards".

— Nowell, on Sublime's success in 1995.

Despite their growing popularity in Southern California, Sublime still was not signed with a major label. Around this same time, Nowell teamed up with longtime friend Gwen Stefani of No Doubt, to record the song "Saw Red". The song was eventually released on Sublime's Robbin' the Hood album, which was self-recorded on a four-track cassette, and released in October 1994. Several songs from the album detail Nowell's worsening drug addiction.

About a year later, Tazy Phillipz took a copy of 40oz. to Freedom to Los Angeles radio station KROQ-FM, requesting that Sublime's song "Date Rape" be added to the playlist. Soon after, MCA Records picked up 40oz. to Freedom for national distribution, and Sublime was scheduled to tour throughout Europe. Nowell, an avid reader who enjoyed quoting historians and philosophers, began studying European history to prepare for the trip. In February 1996, Sublime returned to the studio to record the bulk of their self-titled album, which would be their debut with MCA. Production was done by Paul Leary of the Butthole Surfers (and producer of Marcy Playground and Meat Puppets) at Willie Nelson's Pedernales Studio in Austin, Texas.

Nowell died on May 25, 1996. Sublime's final album was released on July 30, 1996. Its original title, Killin' It, was replaced by the eponymous title Sublime. By 1997, the album had entered Billboard's Top 20, with the largely acoustic single, "What I Got", becoming the number one song on the Modern Rock chart. The album produced three more radio hits: "Santeria", "Wrong Way", and "Doin' Time". Sublime became one of the most successful American rock acts of 1997. Rolling Stone reported in March 2010 that the album Sublime had sold over six million copies.

== Personal life and death ==
=== Marriage and fatherhood ===
While on tour in the early 1990s, Nowell began dating Troy Dendekker. In October 1994, Dendekker became pregnant, giving birth to a son, Jakob Nowell, on June 25, 1995. On May 18, 1996, a week before Nowell's death, the couple married in a Hawaiian-themed ceremony in Las Vegas.

In December 2023, Jakob Nowell joined Sublime as the band's lead singer.

=== Lou Dog ===
In February 1990, Nowell purchased a Dalmatian puppy from an old man for $500, and named him "Louie" after his grandfather. Also referred to as "Lou Dog", he became a mascot for Sublime. Lou Dog was often allowed to wander the stage during concert performances. Louie was also often featured on the cover of Sublime albums, and was referred to in the lyrics of Sublime songs. In Sublime's most successful radio track, "What I Got", Nowell sings, "Livin' with Louie Dog's the only way to stay sane". Another prominent song by the band, "Garden Grove", mentions Lou Dog as such: "We took this trip to Garden Grove. It smelled like Lou Dog inside the van". Lou Dog also appeared in the video for "Santeria", filmed after Nowell's death. Following Nowell's death in 1996, Lou Dog was cared for by Michael Happoldt, the band's manager. Lou Dog died from old age on September 17, 2001.

=== Addiction ===
As Nowell entered his twenties and witnessed his band's success, he decided to try heroin. Nowell's father explained,

His excuse for taking the heroin was that he felt like he had to be larger than life. He was leading the band, leading his fans, and he had to put on this persona. He heard a lot of musicians say they were taking heroin to be more creative.

Nowell became addicted to heroin. According to his widow, Troy Dendekker, the Sublime album Robbin' the Hood was largely recorded inside a Long Beach crack house at the height of his dependency. Nowell is said by some to have predicted his own death in the song "Pool Shark", with the line, "One day I'm gonna lose the war."

=== Death ===
On the morning of May 25, 1996, Sublime was in the midst of a five-day tour through Northern California that was to be followed by a European and East Coast tour. However, while the band was staying at the Ocean View Motel in San Francisco (later Seascape Inn), drummer Bud Gaugh awoke to find Nowell lying on the floor next to his bed. His dalmatian, Lou Dog, was curled up on the bed whimpering. Nowell had tried awakening his bandmates to go to the beach with him that morning, but they were too hung over and tired to get out of bed. Initially, Gaugh assumed that Nowell was too intoxicated to get into bed. However, he noticed a yellow film around his mouth. Gaugh called for paramedics, but Nowell had died several hours earlier and was pronounced dead at the scene. His final performance had taken place the night before his death at The Phoenix Theater in Petaluma, California. Nowell was cremated and his ashes were spread over his favorite surfing spot in Surfside, California. The cause of death was a heroin overdose.

Eight months after Nowell's death, No Doubt headlined a "cautionary" benefit concert in honor of his memory. Nowell's widow wanted to make it clear that the goal of the concert was not to glamorize his death, but rather to promote drug awareness and prevention among fans. Proceeds from the concert were given to a non-profit offering support for musicians struggling with drug addiction, as well as a scholarship fund for Nowell's son, Jakob.

Jason Westfall, one of Sublime's managers, was quoted as saying the surviving members of Sublime had no interest in continuing to perform and record under the "Sublime" name: "Just like Nirvana, Sublime died when Brad died". However, the band later reunited as Sublime with Rome, with Rome Ramirez as lead singer and guitarist, and then as Sublime in 2023 with Nowell's son serving as lead vocalist.

== See also ==
- Dub music
- Long Beach Dub All Stars
- Long Beach Shortbus
