= Volcano (Volcano album) =

Lone album by Volcano

Studio album by Volcano
- Genre: Alternative
- Length: 44:31
- Label: Skunk
- Producer: Miguel (Michael Happoldt)

Professional ratings
Review scores
Source	Rating
Trouser Press	(favorable)
Punknews.org	3.5/5 stars

Volcano was released in 2004. The album was released as a limited edition on Skunk Records and was not reprinted until 2025 when it received a limited vinyl and CD release from Don Giovanni Records.

== Reception ==
Trouser Press, which gave the eponymous album by Eyes Adrift a favorable review, said that Volcano was even better. They noted the "simple rough-in-the-studio mix", the reggae feel of Poutney's basslines, and the "high lonesome" feeling conjured by Kirkwood's "unfettered vocals". They wrote:

"Twisted Seeds" is a high point in Kirkwood's career – with its Jerry Garcia influence and overlapping verses, it's nothing you'd find on a Meat Puppets album. "Arrow" features pseudo-pedal steel and Latin guitar with stylings that echo the era of Meat Puppets II.

Punknews.org said that the reggae- and country-influenced songs were some of the best, and called the album "one of the best of the post-Sublime era" and a "truly unique collaboration and a solid collection of songs".

== Track listing ==
All songs by Curt Kirkwood.

1. "Pine Cone" – 3:38
2. "Twisted Seeds" – 3:25
3. "Love Mine" – 3:35
4. "It Don't Matter" – 2:23
5. "Run Aground" – 3:10
6. "Blown Away" – 2:12
7. "Rave Only" – 3:58
8. "Some Kind of Light" – 3:46
9. "Arrow" – 2:50
10. "Million" – 4:00
11. "Volcano" – 3:48
12. "Greenery" – 4:46
13. "Lonesome Ghost" – 3:00

== Personnel ==
- guitar, vocals – Curt Kirkwood
- guitar, backup vocals, production – "Mike Stand" a.k.a. Michael 'Miguel' Happoldt
- bass – Jon Poutney
- drums – Bud Gaugh
