= Yours Truly (Sublime with Rome album) =

Studio album by Sublime with Rome
- Released: July 12, 2011
- Recorded: February–April 2011
- Studio: Sonic Ranch in El Paso, Texas
- Genres: Ska; reggae; alternative rock
- Length: 38:29 (standard); 53:10 (deluxe); 52:47 (iTunes deluxe)
- Label: Fueled by Ramen
- Producer: Paul Leary

Sublime with Rome chronology
| Yours Truly (2011) | Sirens (2015) |

Singles from Yours Truly
- 1. "Panic" Released: May 10, 2011; 2. "Lovers Rock" Released: June 29, 2011; 3. "Take It or Leave It" Released: October, 2011

Yours Truly is the debut studio album by American rock group Sublime with Rome, released on July 12, 2011 by Fueled by Ramen. It is the first album since the original Sublime disbanded in 1996 following lead singer and guitarist Bradley Nowell's death. According to the liner notes, the album is dedicated to him.

In 2009, Sublime's surviving members, Eric Wilson and Bud Gaugh, reformed the band, with Rome Ramirez filling in for Nowell. However, the group were unable to use the name Sublime for legal reasons, resulting in the name change to Sublime with Rome. After embarking on their first US tour in 2010, Sublime with Rome signed with the record label Fueled by Ramen and began recording their first full-length album. Guitarist Paul Leary of Butthole Surfers, who co-produced Sublime's eponymous final album, produced it.

Yours Truly received mixed reviews. "Panic" was released as the album's first single. It achieved success, reaching No. 4 on Billboard's Alternative Songs and cracking the top 10 on the Rock Songs chart. "Lovers Rock" and "Take It or Leave It" were also released as singles.

Yours Truly is the only Sublime with Rome album recorded with co-founder Bud Gaugh, who left the group in December 2011.

== Background and history ==
Sublime broke up immediately after Bradley Nowell died from a drug overdose in 1996. After the break up, Eric Wilson and Bud Gaugh resurfaced in the band Long Beach Dub Allstars, releasing two albums and then splitting up in 2002. After Long Beach Dub Allstars, Wilson went on to form Long Beach Shortbus, while Gaugh went on to form Eyes Adrift and Volcano (both of which featured Meat Puppets guitarist/vocalist Curt Kirkwood).

In 2009, Gaugh and Wilson reunited for a show in Nevada and called themselves Sublime. They were joined by a new singer-guitarist whose identity was not announced; on March 1, 2009, Gaugh confirmed this was then-20-year-old Northern California native Rome Ramirez, who had previously collaborated with Wilson on RAWsession where he played Sublime songs such a "Saw Red" and "Boss DJ". The trio played another show at Cypress Hill's Smokeout Festival on October 24, 2009 in San Bernardino, California. The festival also featured performances from Kottonmouth Kings, Slipknot, Deftones, Bad Brains and Pennywise. However, because the name Sublime had been trademarked by Bradley Nowell, the band decided to call themselves Sublime with Rome to curtail any legal difficulties.

Work on Yours Truly began as early as 2010 and Gaugh told Billboard.com that Sublime with Rome would enter the studio in June for a week "and nail down some of the more worked-out songs, and possibly even finish one or two of them for a late summer radio release". The band was expected to have the album out in 2011. On February 5, 2011, Sublime With Rome announced on their official website that they were planning to enter the studio in March to begin recording their debut album, with Butthole Surfers guitarist Paul Leary producing. On February 21, 2011 (Wilson's 41st birthday), the band posted a statement on their Facebook page saying that they had begun recording the album and would be posting "mad videos" to "let everyone know where to go for a behind the scenes look at the Sublime With Rome process." On April 14, 2011, Rome posted an update on Sublime With Rome's official website saying that the album was almost finished and expected for a summer release. During the summer 2010 tour, Sublime With Rome performed their first new song "Panic" on Jimmy Kimmel Live!. It was also announced that Sublime with Rome officially signed to record label Fueled By Ramen and would release their debut album Yours Truly on July 12, 2011.

The band began streaming the album in its entirety via their official Facebook page on July 6, 2011.

Sublime with Rome was invited to promote Yours Truly by supporting 311 on their Universal Pulse tour, dubbed the 2011 Unity Tour. Special guests included DJ Soulman and DJ Trichrome.

== Critical reception ==
Professional ratings
Aggregate scores
| Source | Rating |
|---|---|
| Metacritic | 48/100 |
Review scores
| Source | Rating |
| AllMusic | 3/5 stars |
| Alternative Press | 2.5/5 stars |
| The A.V. Club | C− |
| Consequence of Sound | 2.5/5 stars |
| Entertainment Weekly | B− |
| Kerrang! | 1/5 stars |
| Now | 2/5 stars |
| Rock Sound | 6/10 |

Critical reception has been generally mixed, with the album receiving a 48 on Metacritic. The AllMusic review by Jason Lymangrover states: "Yours Truly doesn't quite match the caliber of the albums in the Sublime discography, but it's a fairly enjoyable spin-off just the same". Ultimate-Guitar.com praised Yours Truly as a "solid release with tracks appealing to original fans as well as those with Rome's flair of originality."

== Commercial performance ==
The album debuted at No. 9 on Billboard 200, and No. 3 on Rock Albums, selling 35,000 copies in its first week. The album has sold 153,000 copies in the United States as of June 2015.

== Charts ==
| Chart (2011) | Peak position |
|---|---|
| US Billboard 200 | 9 |
| US Top Alternative Albums (Billboard) | 3 |
| US Top Rock Albums (Billboard) | 3 |
| US Indie Store Album Sales (Billboard) | 3 |

== Track listing ==
All tracks are written by Rome Ramirez, Eric Wilson, and Bud Gaugh, except "Can You Feel It", written by Ramirez, Wilson, Gaugh, and Cameron Thomaz.

| No. | Title | Length |
|---|---|---|
| 1. | "Panic" | 2:23 |
| 2. | "Only" | 2:40 |
| 3. | "Lovers Rock" | 3:25 |
| 4. | "Murdera" | 4:26 |
| 5. | "My World" | 2:29 |
| 6. | "Paper Cuts" | 1:53 |
| 7. | "PCH" | 3:23 |
| 8. | "Same Old Situation" | 3:44 |
| 9. | "Take It or Leave It" | 3:52 |
| 10. | "You Better Listen" | 3:20 |
| 11. | "Spun" | 3:27 |
| 12. | "Can You Feel It" (Featuring Wiz Khalifa) | 3:36 |

Deluxe Edition Bonus Tracks
| No. | Title | Length |
|---|---|---|
| 13. | "Dynamite" | 7:52 |
| 14. | "Safe and Sound" | 3:14 |
| 15. | "Lovers Rock" (Acoustic) | 3:35 |

iTunes Bonus Tracks
| No. | Title | Length |
|---|---|---|
| 13. | "Dynamite" | 7:52 |
| 14. | "Safe and Sound" | 3:14 |
| 15. | "Panic" (Acoustic) | 3:12 |

== Personnel ==
- Rome Ramirez – vocals, guitar
- Eric Wilson – bass
- Bud Gaugh – drums, percussion
- Todd Forman – saxophone
- DJ Rocky Rock – DJ /turntables
- Aimee Allen – additional vocals ("Safe And Sound")
- Maggie Walters – additional vocals ("You Better Listen" and other tracks)
