= Jessy Moss =

American singer

- Born: c. 1977–1978; England
- Musical career
- Origin: San Pedro, California, United States
- Genres: Electroclash
- Occupations: Rapper, Singer
- Instrument: Vocals
- Years active: 2002–present
- Label: DreamWorks
- Website: MySpace page

Jessy Moss is an Australian-American singer. She was formerly signed to DreamWorks Records. and her songs have appeared in a number of movies and television shows. She is also known for the Armand Van Helden remix of her song "Sugar".

== Early life and career ==
Moss was born in England and moved to the Australian state of New South Wales as an infant. She was raised in the coastal town of Byron Bay. Her parents divorced when she was 13, with her mother moving to the United States and Moss staying with her father in Australia. While visiting her mother in southern California, she caught the attention of a producer, who asked her to sing backup vocals for a project that he was working on. That led to an internship at Total Access Recording Studios in Redondo Beach, where she worked on records by artists including Long Beach Dub Allstars and Dio. On July 29, 2003, she released her debut solo album, Street Knuckles, on DreamWorks Records. She co-produced the record with Rick Hahn, Camara Kambon, and Butch Vig. That August, she was part of the Sprite Liquid Mix Tour with groups like N.E.R.D, The Roots, and Robert Randolph & the Family Band. In January 2004, her Street Knuckles song "Telling You Now" appeared in the DreamWorks Pictures film Win a Date with Tad Hamilton!, which was directed by Robert Luketic, another Australian expat in the United States.

In November 2003, DreamWorks Records was separated from the movie/television arm of the company, and sold to Universal Music Group, who shut it down shortly afterwards. Because of this, Moss self-released her second album, Fast and Cheap, in 2005. "Sugar", a song from that album, appeared on Armand Van Helden's 2005 Ultra Records mix CD, Nympho. Ultra released "Sugar" as a single in early 2006 (as Armand Van Helden featuring Jessy Moss) and managed to chart as high as No. 25 on the Billboard Hot Dance Singles Sales chart. Moss also released her third album, Down at the Disco, in 2006.

== Discography ==
=== Albums and EPs ===
- Street Knuckles (2003, DreamWorks)
- Fast and Cheap (2005, self-released)
- Polyamorous EP (2005, self-released)
- Down at the Disco (2006, self-released)

=== Singles ===
- "Sugar" (2006, Ultra) (credited as "Armand Van Helden featuring Jessy Moss") (#25 Hot Dance Singles Sales)

=== Compilation appearances ===
- Flo Mix (2003) (song: "Thanks for the Pictures")
- Your Attention Please (2003) (song: "Confessions")
- UnButtoned (2003) (song "Build You Up")
- Lucky Sounds Volume Two (2003) (song: "Build You Up")
- Nympho (mixed by Armand Van Helden) (2005, Ultra) (song: "Sugar")
- Hope: Love Is the Answer (2006) (song: "Old Glory")
- Sonicbids Presents The Real Deal (Listen Volume 2) (2006) (song: "Bitten Off")
- Inkslingers Ball (2006) (song: "Alarm")

=== Studio credits ===
- Frenzal Rhomb : A Man's Not a Camel (assistant engineer)
- Long Beach Dub Allstars : Right Back (assistant engineer)
- Dio : Magica (assistant engineer)
- Long Beach Dub Allstars : Wonders of the World (engineer)
- Cypress Hill : Stoned Raiders (background vocals)

=== Song use ===
- "So What" (from Polyamorous) in Wassup Rockers (2006)
- "Pick a Card" (from Street Knuckles) in Saved (2006)
- "Telling You Now" (from Street Knuckles) in Win a Date with Tad Hamilton! (2004), DEBS (2004), Smallville, and Las Vegas

=== Music videos ===
- "Telling You Now", "Pick a Card", "So What"
