= Eric Wilson (musician) =

American bassist (born 1970)

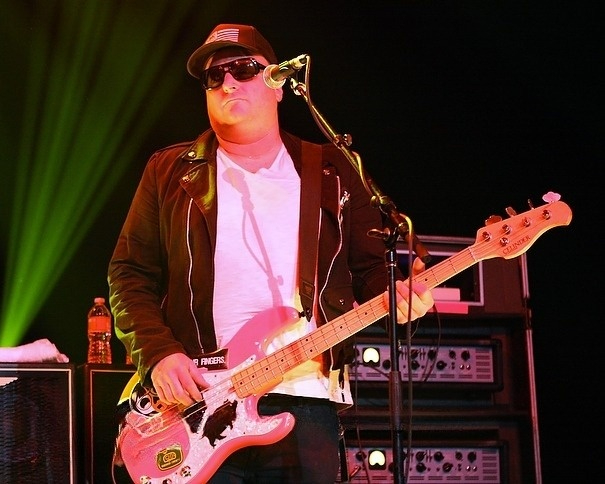
- Wilson with Sublime with Rome in 2010

Background information
- Genres: Ska; punk rock; reggae; alternative rock; alternative hip hop; dub; pop rock
- Occupation: Bassist
- Instruments: Bass; keyboards; percussion; vocals
- Years active: 1981–present
- Labels: Fueled by Ramen; MCA; Skunk; DreamWorks; Long Beach; AFO
- Member of: Sublime
- Formerly of: Del Noah & the Mt. Ararat Finks; Long Beach Dub Allstars; Long Beach Shortbus; Sublime with Rome; Spray Allen

Eric Wilson is an American musician who is best known as the bassist for Sublime. He was also bassist for Long Beach Dub Allstars (1997–2002), and Long Beach Shortbus (2002–2007), which was composed of several members of Long Beach Dub Allstars and Sublime. From 2009 to 2024, Wilson was the bassist for Sublime with Rome, a musical collaboration between Wilson and singer and guitarist Rome Ramirez.

== Musical career ==
=== Career beginnings ===
Wilson was childhood friends with Bud Gaugh. His father, Bill Wilson, taught Gaugh how to play drums. Gaugh and Eric Wilson played together in garage punk bands, such as Juice Bros., throughout high school. Wilson and Bradley Nowell met in 1979 and later started a punk band called Hogan's Heroes, before changing their name to Sloppy Seconds (not to be confused with the Indiana hardcore punk band of the same name).

=== 1988–1996: Sublime ===
Wilson introduced friend Bradley Nowell to his long-time friend Bud Gaugh, and the three of them went on to form Sublime in 1988. Wilson contributed to all three of the bands studio albums: 40oz. to Freedom (1992), Robbin' the Hood (1994), and Sublime (1996). Sublime originally disbanded following Nowell's death in 1996.

=== 1996–2009: Post-Sublime bands ===
After the dissolution of Sublime, Wilson temporarily joined up with 1960s style surf rock band Del Noah & the Mt. Ararat Finks. He played stand-up bass in the group.

Wilson, along with Bud Gaugh and other Skunk Records affiliates, continued experimenting within the ska punk genre. They eventually formed many Sublime-related bands, most of whom signed with the Long Beach record label. In 1997, Wilson helped form the Long Beach Dub Allstars, and their first album, Right Back was released on DreamWorks Records in 1999. Long Beach Dub Allstars second album Wonders of the World was released in 2001. However, the band broke up shortly after in 2002. Wilson did not rejoin when the band reunited in 2012.

Wilson, along with RAS-1 of Long Beach Dub Allstars, formed Long Beach Shortbus in 2002. The band split up in October 2007 after producing two albums. Wilson later joined the band Stonewing. He also played in an Iggy Pop cover band called the Stymies. While gigging with the Stymies at a house party, Wilson first began to perform Sublime songs with Rome Ramirez.

=== 2009–2024: Sublime with Rome and Spray Allen ===
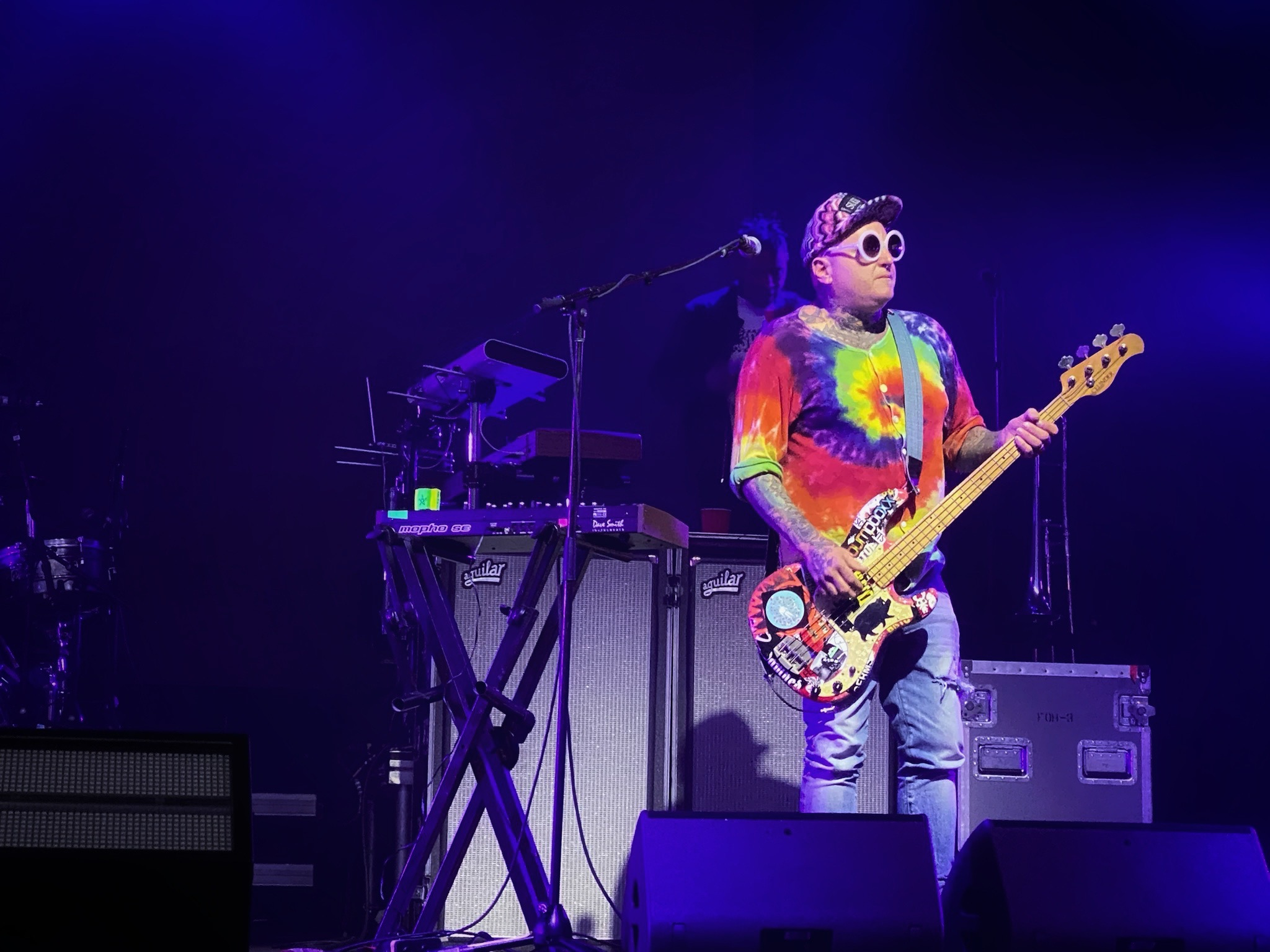
Eric Wilson plays bass with Sublime with Rome at the Amphitheatre at Coney Island, NY in 2021

It was announced in early 2009 that Wilson would be reuniting with Sublime at Cantina Los Tres Hombres in Sparks, Nevada, on February 28 with Bud Gaugh and new frontman and guitarist Rome Ramirez. Following positive response, the band decided to reunite properly in August 2009 for a possible tour and new album. However, not long after the October 2009 performance at Cypress Hill's Smokeout Festival, a Los Angeles judge banned the new lineup from using the Sublime name and the band was forced to change the name. The new lineup of Wilson, Gaugh and Ramirez performed together as Sublime with Rome. Their debut album, Yours Truly was released on July 12, 2011. In December 2011, Gaugh left Sublime with Rome, reportedly to spend more time with his family. He was replaced by Josh Freese and the band continued to tour. Wilson would contribute to the albums Sirens (2015), Blessings (2019), and Sublime with Rome (2024).

In the summer of 2019, Wilson formed a 4-piece rock band called Spray Allen. Wilson took influence from psychedelic rock bands such as Pink Floyd and Led Zeppelin, along with Jim Morrison's vocal style. They released their debut single and music video for the song, "Stay Clean" in May 2021. The single was produced by Paul Leary of the Butthole Surfers, along with Stu Brooks from Dub Trio and Gabrial McNair from No Doubt. Spray Allen consisted of Daniel Lonner on vocals, Eric Sherman on guitar, Lyle Riddle on Drums, and Wilson on bass.

On February 26, 2024, Wilson announced via Instagram that he was no longer performing with Sublime with Rome and would only be performing with Sublime, which would continue with Bradley Nowell's son Jakob Nowell on lead vocals.

=== 2023–present: Sublime reunion ===
In December 2023, Wilson and Gaugh reunited to perform with Jakob Nowell as Sublime during a benefit show for Bad Brains vocalist H.R. at the Teragram Ballroom in Los Angeles. They toured at Coachella and additional music festivals the following year.

== Personal life ==
Wilson was born in 1970. Wilson's father, Billy, was a big band jazz drummer. He performed in groups such as the Shanghai Philharmonic Orchestra and joined the United States Coast Guard Band after World War II. Billy Wilson was a large influence on Eric Wilson's sound.

On April 2, 2019, Wilson broke his arm and four ribs in an ATV accident on his avocado ranch in California. Days after, he was reported to be in stable condition at a San Diego hospital.

== Discography ==
Sublime

- 40 Oz. to Freedom (1992)
- Robbin' the Hood (1994)
- Sublime (1996)
- Second-hand Smoke (1997)

Del Noah & the Mt. Ararat Finks

- Blower Explosion (1998)

Long Beach Dub All-Stars

- Right Back (1999)
- Wonders of the World (2001)

Long Beach Shortbus

- Flying Ship of Fantasy (2004)

Sublime With Rome

- Yours Truly (2011)
- Sirens (2015)
- Blessings (2019)
- Sublime With Rome (2024)
