= Right Back =

Right Back may refer to:

- Right back, a player position in association football (soccer)
- Right Back (album), by Long Beach Dub Allstars, 1999
- "Right Back" (song), by Khalid, 2019
- "Right Back", a song by A Boogie wit da Hoodie from Artist 2.0, 2020
- "Right Back", a song by DJ Drama from Quality Street Music 2, 2016
- "Right Back", a song by O.T. Genasis from Coke N Butter, 2016
- "Right Back", a song by Sublime from 40oz. to Freedom, 1992
