= RAS-1 =

American guitarist and singer

- Born: Richard Arthur Smith; North Long Beach, California
- Genres: Ska punk; punk rock; reggae; alternative rock; dub
- Occupations: Guitarist, singer
- Instrument: Guitar
- Labels: Skunk; DreamWorks
- Website: https://ras1music.com/

Richard Arthur Smith, known professionally as RAS-1, is a guitarist and singer known as a founder of Long Beach Shortbus, alongside Sublime bassist Eric Wilson, drummer Damien Ramirez, and Trey Pangborn. Smith was also one of the founding members of Long Beach Dub Allstars along with Eric Wilson and Sublime drummer Bud Gaugh.

== Biography ==
Smith was born in North Long Beach, California. He is the son of singer Dora Gail Smith, formerly of the all girl Long Beach jazz quartet Dream, and Union Pacific Railroad worker Richard Smith.

As a teenager, Smith was in a psychedelic rock band called The Griffin with his cousin J-Sun, later of the band Stonewing. Following this, he played guitar and sang with a reggae band called Jah Children, which played backyard parties in Long Beach and occasionally opened for Sublime. Smith was also a member of band All Day with Randy Bradbury of Pennywise and Paul McFadyen.

Along with other Skunk Records affiliates, Smith joined the Long Beach Dub Allstars in 1997. Their debut album, Right Back, was released on DreamWorks Records in 1999. Long Beach Dub Allstars second album Wonders of the World was released in 2001. However, the band broke up shortly after in 2002. Smith was not active in the band after they reunited in 2012. Smith and Eric Wilson went on to form Long Beach Shortbus. The band later split in October 2007.

On March 21, 2022, RAS-1 announced he was working on new music with Jungle Josh and Fat Mike of NOFX. In 2023, Smith released his self-titled solo EP Ras-1. The EP was released on Fat Mike's label Bottles To The Ground, an imprint of Fat Wreck Chords.

== See also ==
- List of reggae artists
