= Marshall Goodman =

American drummer

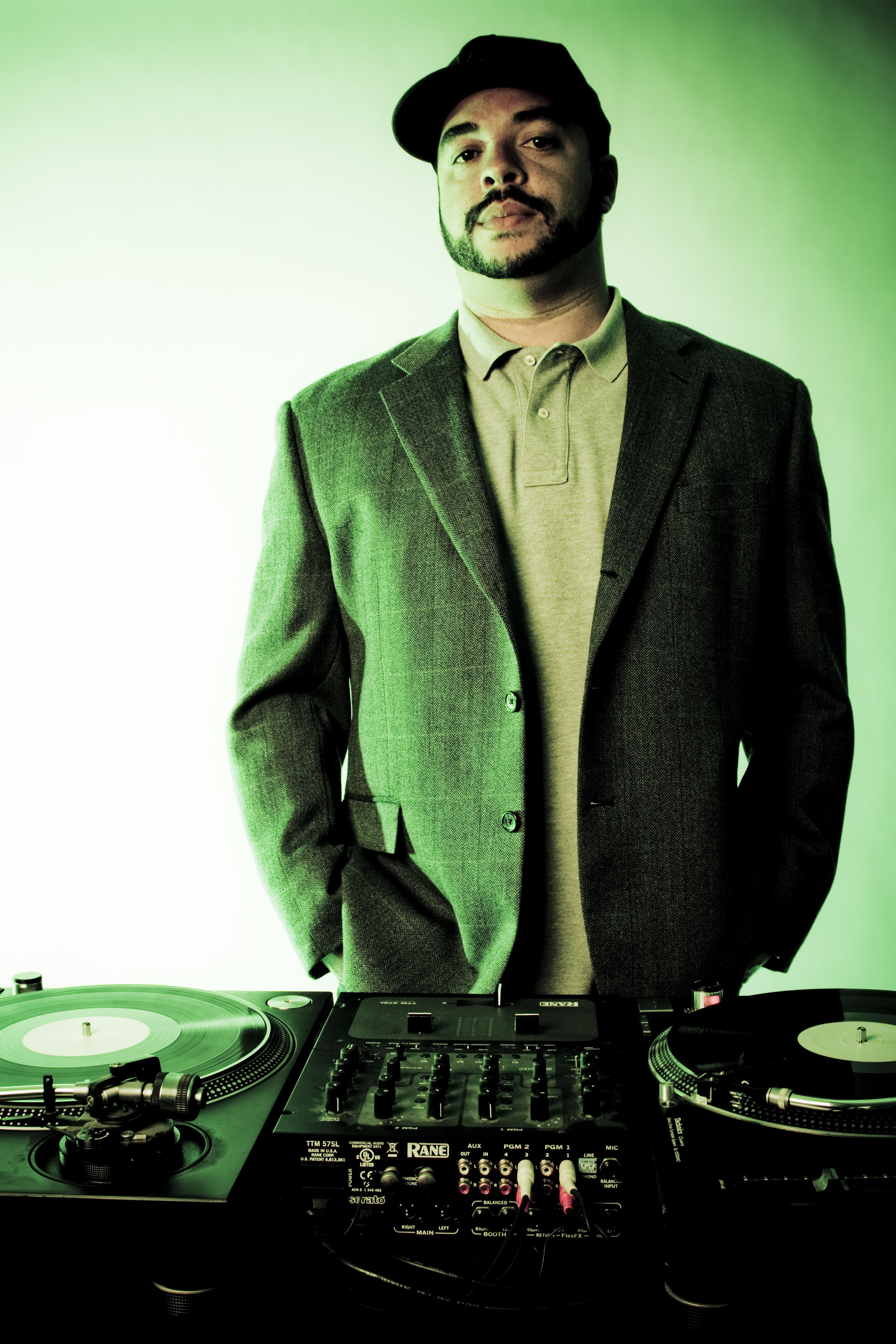
- Goodman in 2010

Background information
- Also known as: Ras MG, MG, Field Marshall, Field, Fields
- Born: January 31, 1971 (age 55); Chicago, Illinois, United States
- Origin: Chicago, Illinois, United States
- Genres: Hip hop, reggae, alternative
- Occupations: Drummer, songwriter, politician
- Instruments: Drums, turntables, percussion
- Years active: 1990–present
- Labels: Marshall Arts Music, DreamWorks
- Formerly of: Long Beach Dub Allstars

Marshall Goodman (born January 31, 1971), known professionally as Ras MG (also known as MG, Field Marshall, Field, or Fields) is an American musician, songwriter and producer.

== Career ==
=== Sublime years: 1990–1992, 1994–1996 ===
Goodman was the secondary drummer of the Southern California-based music group Sublime from 1990 to 1992 and played on 14 of the 22 songs on the band's multi-platinum selling 40oz to Freedom including "Date Rape", "Smoke Two Joints", "54-46 That's My Number/Ball and Chain", and "Hope". Additionally, Goodman co-wrote the songs "Doin' Time" and "April 29, 1992 (Miami)" from Sublime's eponymous album.

=== Long Beach Dub Allstars years: 1996–2002 ===
In 1996, after Sublime's Bradley Nowell died, a group was formed to perform Sublime songs at "Enough Already", a benefit show. This group went on to become the nationally touring act the Long Beach Dub Allstars in which Goodman was the co-drummer, DJ, percussionist, producer (Right Back), songwriter, and voting member. Goodman co-wrote the band's single "Sunny Hours"

=== 2002–present ===
The Long Beach Dub Allstars broke up in 2002 and Goodman toured as the drummer for DreamWorks artist Jessy Moss in 2003. The band appeared in the film Win a Date with Tad Hamilton! in 2004.

In 2008 Goodman remixed Good Charlotte's song "Broken Hearts Parade" for their Greatest Remixes album with longtime collaborator and friend Michael Happoldt. Goodman and Happoldt also conducted the reunion of LBDA in 2012.

2012: Goodman programmed drums and scratched on Slightly Stoopid's album Top of the World and performed scratches live with band on numerous occasions in 2012 and 2013, including the Jimmy Kimmel Live! Show and the KROQ Almost Acoustic Christmas at the Gibson Amphitheatre.

In November 2016, Goodman was elected city councilmember for the City of La Palma, California.

In November 2018, Goodman was appointed Mayor of the City of La Palma, California for a term of two years expiring in December 2024.

== Selected discography ==
- 40oz to Freedom (Sublime, 1992)
- Crossing All Borders (Tha Mexakinz, 1994)
- Sublime (Sublime, 1996)
- Step Into a World (Marshall Arts Music Remix) (KRS-One, 1997)
- Gravesend (Lake of Fire), Promo CD (Lordz of Brooklyn, 1997)
- Second-hand Smoke (Sublime, 1997)
- Take Warning: Songs of Operation Ivy (Operation Ivy, 1997)
- Psychedelic Souls (Wailing Souls, 1998)
- Long Beach Dub Allstars and Friends (Long Beach Dub Allstars, 1998)
- The Longest Barrel Ride (Slightly Stoopid, 1998)
- Right Back (Long Beach Dub Allstars, 1999)
- Mood Swings (Capitol Eye, 1999)
- Wonders of the World (Long Beach Dub Allstars, 2001)
- Up All Night (Unwritten Law, 2001)
- Elva (Unwritten Law, 2002)
- Oh La La (Monsier Leroc, 2003)
- Everything You Need (Slightly Stoopid, 2003)
- Narrow Path (Josh One, 2003)
- Andiamo (Authority Zero, 2004)
- Gold (Sublime, 2005)
- Closer to the Sun (Slightly Stoopid, 2005)
- Dishwalla (Dishwalla, 2005)
- 10th Anniversary Deluxe Edition (Sublime, 2006)
- Simple Man (Jack Maness, 2006)
- Everything Under the Sun (Sublime, 2006)
- Holy Homework (Philieano, 2007)
- Spiritual Life (Toko Tasi, 2007)
- Suffer in Style (Look Daggers, 2008)
- Greatest Remixes (Good Charlotte, 2008)
- The Frank Zappa AAAFNRAAAA Birthday Bundle 2010 (Frank Zappa, 2010)
- James Kelly (LMNO, 2010)
- Top of the World (Slightly Stoopid, 2012)
- The Masterpiece (Bobby Brown, 2012)
- Words (Ras MG, 2014)
- Count Me In Remix EP (Rebelution, 2015)
- Livin' Free (Roots of Creation, 2016)
