= Todd Forman =

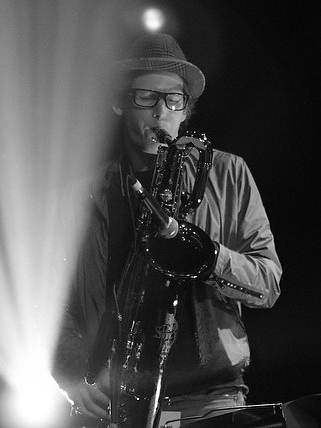
- Forman with Sublime with Rome in 2010

Background information
- Born: December 17, 1969 (age 56)
- Origin: Long Beach, California
- Genres: Ska punk; jazz; swing
- Occupations: Musician; physician
- Instruments: Saxophone; keyboards; percussion; clarinet
- Member of: Jelly of the Month Club
- Formerly of: Sublime; Sublime with Rome

Todd Forman (born December 17, 1969) is an American saxophonist and practicing physician, best known as a touring musician with Sublime and Sublime with Rome.

== Career ==
Forman played with Sublime from 1989 until their breakup in 1996, he played with them when he was home from studying at Harvard University. Forman met the band while playing in a jazz band, after being invited to jam with some musicians at a Long Beach party. Forman primarily played with the band when he was home for the summer break from studying.

After studying at Harvard, he went to medical school at UCLA, and received a master's degree in medical education from USC. He set up a medical practice in Newport Beach in 2005 with his mother. Before opening his practice he was a professor of Clinical Medicine at Keck School of Medicine of USC.

Following Sublime's break-up in 1996, Forman initially joined other former bandmates in the Long Beach Dub Allstars, but he departed soon after, having met his future wife Kristen, and continued to pursue his medical career. He did not play music for another seven years until he received a blessing from his wife in 2006 to get back into music.

Forman initially played local gigs with 3rd Alley before he joined Sublime with Rome in 2009, a band founded by surviving Sublime band members Eric Wilson and Bud Gaugh. Forman received a phone call four days before the band's first show, asking for him to audition. He toured the world with Sublime in Rome from October 2009 till April 2011.

Forman is also the founding member of Jelly of the Month Club, the band also consisting of Forman on saxophone, clarinet and organ, the late Bert Susanka on lead vocals and rhythm guitar, Mike “Mic Dangerously” de la Torre on lead vocals and lead guitar, James Kee on bass and upright bass, Scott Wittenberg on drums and Chris “Mr. Crumb” Caplan handling vocals, piano, organ, ukulele, accordion, spoons and guitar. The band has also included Sublime's Bud Gaugh on drums.

Forman is also co-founder of Moxy Brothers, a music production company, alongside No Doubt's Adrian Young. Moxy Brothers have produced, written, and played for dozens of artists and have scored two feature films - the horror film, "Oak" and the thriller, "Misdirection." Both slated for a 2025 release.

== Personal life ==
Forman is married to Kristen, a Newport Beach dermatologist, and has two kids. Despite the lyrical content of Sublime songs, Forman is against recreational drug use, saying "Kids have to understand that drugs take people away. Even if they don’t die, they become ghosts. Drugs take them away from their lives."

== Discography ==
Sublime and Sublime with Rome

- 40oz. to Freedom (1992)
- Sublime (1996)
- Yours Truly (2011)

Other artists

- Del Noah & The Mt. Ararat Finks – In... Blower Explosion!! (1998)
- The Dirty Heads – Cabin By The Sea (2012)
- Steel Pulse - Only One World
- Jelly of the Month Club - Introducing, Jelly of the Month Club & Enjoy the Show
- 3rd Alley - Shiny Shady People & shoulda, woulda, coulda
- Happy Tank - UFUh-O
