= Wonders of the World (album) =

Studio album by Long Beach Dub Allstars
- Released: September 11, 2001
- Studio: Total Access Recording (Redondo Beach, CA)
- Length: 59:26
- Label: Skunk; DreamWorks
- Producer: David Gamson; Marshall Goodman; Oliver Leiber; Paul Leary; The Burn Unit

Long Beach Dub Allstars chronology
Right Back (1999)	Wonders of the World (2001)	Long Beach Dub Allstars (2020)

Singles from Wonders of the world
- 1. "Sunny Hours" Released: 2001

Professional ratings
Review scores
Source	Rating
AllMusic	4/5 stars
Spin	7/10

Wonders of the World is the second studio album by American reggae rock band Long Beach Dub Allstars. It was released on September 11, 2001, via Skunk/DreamWorks Records. Recorded and mixed at Total Access Studios in Redondo Beach, it was produced by Paul Leary, David Gamson, Marshall Goodman, Oliver Leiber, and the Burn Unit. It features guest appearances from Chali 2na, Half Pint, I-Man, Ives Irie, Paulie Selekta, Tippa Irie and Will.i.am. The album debuted at number 59 on the Billboard 200 chart in the United States. Its lead single, "Sunny Hours", peaked at number 28 on the Alternative Airplay, and was used in 2002 films Local Boys and Life or Something Like It and TV series Joey.

== Track listing ==
No.	Title	Producer(s)	Length
1.	"Wonders Dub 1"	Paul Leary	1:05
2.	"Sunny Hours" (featuring will.i.am)	Oliver Leiber; David Gamson; Paul Leary	3:58
3.	"Listen to DJ's"	Paul Leary	3:19
4.	"Rolled Up"	Paul Leary	3:16
5.	"Every Mother's Dream"	Paul Leary	1:48
6.	"Life Goes On" (featuring Half Pint, Ives Irie, Chali 2na and Tippa Irie)	Marshall Goodman	3:17
7.	"It Ain't Easy"	Paul Leary	3:23
8.	"Luke"	Paul Leary	4:07
9.	"Wonders Dub II"	Paul Leary	4:38
10.	"No Way"	Paul Leary	2:29
11.	"Lonely End"	Paul Leary	3:36
12.	"Talkin' the Truth" (featuring Paulie Selekta)	The Burn Unit	3:16
13.	"Free Love"	Paul Leary	3:22
14.	"Lies" (featuring I-Man)	Paul Leary	3:06
15.	"Kablammin' It"	Paul Leary	4:40
16.	"Grass Cloud"	Paul Leary	6:36
17.	"Sunny Hours (Reprise)"	Paul Leary	3:30
Total length:			59:26

== Personnel ==
- Opie Ortiz – vocals, artwork
- Richard "RAS-1" Smith – vocals, guitars
- Jack Maness – vocals, keyboards, Hammond B3 organ
- Tim Wu – vocals, saxophone, flute, MIDI Wind controller
- Eric Wilson – electric and upright bass
- Marshall Goodman – drums, percussion, turntables
- Floyd Gaugh – drums
- Paul Leary – producer (tracks: 1–5, 7–11, 13–17), mixing
- Eddie Ashworth – engineering, mixing
- Brian Gardner – mastering
- Brian "B+" Cross – back cover photo
- William "will.i.am" Adams Jr. – rap vocals (track 2)
- Michael "Miguel" Happoldt – background vocals (tracks: 4, 8, 13), melodica (tracks: 1, 9), electric guitar (track 2), mixing (track 12)
- Jeff "Skunk" Baxter – pedal steel guitar (track 2)
- Aaron Owens – guitar (track 6)
- Gabriel McNair – E-MU keyboard & horn arrangement (track 6)
- Oliver Leiber – producer (track 2)
- David Gamson – producer & mixing (track 2)
- The Burn Unit – producers (track 12)

== Charts ==
Chart (2001)	Peak position
US Billboard 200	59
