= Das Klown =

Musical artist

- Origin: Long Beach, California
- Genres: Thrash; Street punk Punk
- Years active: 1989 – 2005
- Labels: Posh Boy, Flipside, Long Beach Records, Skunk, Know Records
- Members: AJ Randsdell (Vocals)

Das Klown is a street punk band from Long Beach, California, formed in 1989. Known for their "In Your Face" punk style, Das Klown was one of the quintessential 90's SoCal punk bands. Singer AJ Ransdell is often seen performing in clown make-up and a red nose.

== Members ==
- AJ Ransdell - Vocals
- Chris Ekstedt - Guitar
- Brain Coakley - Guitar
- Sam Hare - Bass
- Justin Parnell - Drums

=== Past members ===
- Jayson Van Auken - Guitar
- Jimbo T. - Guitar/Bass
- Rikk Agnew - Guitar
- Nate Light - Bass
- Lantz Krantz - Drums
- Nick Vit - Drums
- Kevin Huddleson - Drums
- Justin Parnell - Drums
- Mike Christie - Guitar
- Eric “Unusual” Helms - Guitar

== Discography ==
(*Note: Discography does not follow in any order)

- Flipside

Das Klown (7-inch EP)

- Posh Boy

Laughing Stalk (CD/LP)

- Doctor Dream

Ha Ha Ha Ha Ha (7-inch EP)

- Triple X

Rapid Fire (CD)
Das Klown "#2" (7-inch EP)

- Know Records

Das Klown/All Day split (7-inch EP)
Das Klown "Blow Yer Self" (7-inch EP)
Das Klown/Drain Bramaged split (7-inch EP)
Das Klown "Holy Crap!" (CD/LP)
Das Klown "Sink Or Swim" (7-inch EP)
Das Klown "Live At Zed" (CD)
What Were We Fighting for? (DK CD compilation)
Bite The Bullet (CD compilation)

- Skunk/Long Beach Records

Long Beach Blvd (CD compilation)
When Punkers were Punk and Parents were Scared (CD compilation)
Antidote (CD/LP)
Secret Hate/Das Klown (7-inch EP)
Skunk Records Sampler Fall '98 (CD)
Skunk Records Sampler Spring '99 (CD)

== See also ==
- Secret Hate
