= Sirens (Sublime with Rome album) =

Studio album by Sublime with Rome
- Released: July 17, 2015
- Recorded: 2014–2015
- Studio: Sonic Ranch in El Paso, Texas
- Genre: Ska; reggae; alternative rock
- Length: 33:53
- Label: BMG
- Producer: Paul Leary

Sublime with Rome chronology
Yours Truly (2011)	Sirens (2015)	Blessings (2019)

Singles from Sirens
- 1. "Wherever You Go" Released: May 13, 2015; 2. "Sirens" Released: June 29, 2015

Sirens is the second album by rock group Sublime with Rome, which was released on July 17, 2015. It is the only album to include notable drummer Josh Freese following Bud Gaugh's departure in 2011.

"Wherever You Go" was released as the album's first single, reaching No. 17 on Billboard's Alternative Songs chart.

== Reception ==
Professional ratings
Aggregate scores
Source	Rating
Metacritic	48/100
Review scores
Source	Rating
Allmusic	3.5/5 stars
Billboard	2/5 stars
Rolling Stone	2.5/5 stars

=== Critical ===
Sirens has been given a Metacritic score of 48, indicating mixed or average reviews. Jon Dolan of Rolling Stone wrote that the album "stirs up the same hey-whatever mix of reggae, hip-hop and punk that made Sublime shirtless charmers 20 years ago", and David Jeffries of AllMusic judged this album "a step up" from their debut album Yours Truly. Garrett Kamps of Billboard magazine on the other hand thought that "the tunes are competently rendered, but that actually makes them worse: That these guys are selling out shows as what amounts to a cover band is the kind of thing you need to be super-baked to wrap your head around."

=== Commercial ===
Sirens was released on 17 July 2015. The album reached No. 34 on the Billboard 200 chart, selling around 13,000 copies in the United States in its first week of release. Album sales quickly fell and the album exited the charts after one week.

== Track listing ==
No.	Title	Length
1.	"Sirens" (featuring The Dirty Heads)	3:15
2.	"Wherever You Go"	3:31
3.	"Brazilia"	3:25
4.	"House Party"	3:31
5.	"Been Losing Sleep"	3:40
6.	"Promise Land Dub"	5:26
7.	"Best Of Me"	2:17
8.	"Put Down Your Weapon"	2:11
9.	"Run and Hide"	1:15
10.	"Skankin" (Fishbone cover)	2:18
11.	"Gasoline"	3:04

== Charts ==
Chart (2015)	Peak position
US Billboard 200	34
US Top Alternative Albums (Billboard)	2
US Independent Albums (Billboard)	5
US Top Rock Albums (Billboard)	3
US Indie Store Album Sales (Billboard)	3

== Personnel ==
- Rome Ramirez – vocals, guitar
- Eric Wilson – bass
- Josh Freese – drums, percussion
- Leigh "LDontheCut" Snyder – DJ/turntables
