= Bud Gaugh =

American drummer

- Born: Floyd Gaugh; Hawaii, U.S.
- Genres: Ska punk; punk rock; reggae; alternative rock; dub
- Occupation: Drummer
- Instruments: Drums; percussion; synthesizer; sampler
- Years active: 1979–present
- Labels: MCA; Skunk; DreamWorks; spinART

Floyd "Bud" Gaugh is an American drummer who is a member of the band Sublime, and previously played in Long Beach Dub Allstars (1997–2002), Eyes Adrift (2002–2003), Volcano (2004), and Sublime with Rome (2009–2011), as well as Phil & the Blanx, Del Mar, and Jelly of the Month Club.

== Biography ==
=== Early life ===
Gaugh was born in Hawaii but grew up in Long Beach, California.

Gaugh was childhood friends with Eric Wilson. Gaugh stated that Eric's father, Bill, "was like a second father to me, a total inspiration". Bill Wilson taught Gaugh how to play drums. Gaugh and Eric Wilson played together in garage punk bands, such as Juice Bros., throughout high school.

=== 1988–1996: Sublime ===
Eric Wilson introduced Gaugh to Bradley Nowell, and the trio went on to form Sublime in 1988. Gaugh's drumming is heard on all four of the band's studio albums: 40oz. to Freedom (1992), Robbin' the Hood (1994), Sublime (1996), and Until the Sun Explodes (2026).

Around 1990, according to Marshall Goodman, Gaugh left Sublime and Goodman assumed sole drumming responsibilities. Gaugh was not the primary drummer on the 40oz. to Freedom record. When Gaugh rejoined, Sublime became a five-person collaboration between himself, Wilson, Nowell, Goodman, and Michael Happoldt. In 1996, Sublime disbanded due to the death of lead singer Bradley Nowell from a heroin overdose.

=== 1996–2009: Post-Sublime bands ===
Gaugh was a founding member of the Long Beach Dub Allstars in 1997. Their first album, released in 1999, was called Right Back. They followed it with Wonders of the World in 2002. Long Beach Dub Allstars broke up in 2002, and Gaugh did not rejoin when the band reunited in 2012. Gaugh stated in an interview that he didn't "harbor any grudges towards any musicians in the band. It was more of outside influences that was a problem there."

Gaugh played drums in Eyes Adrift with Krist Novoselic and Curt Kirkwood. After Eyes Adrift disbanded, he went on to form Volcano with Kirkwood. Volcano released one self-titled album in 2004.

Gaugh formed the surf rock band Del Mar in 2006 with his wife Nicole Gaugh on guitar, alongside guitarist Matt Bode and bassist Mike Martinez. They released one album, After the Quake (2009).

=== 2009–2011: Sublime With Rome ===
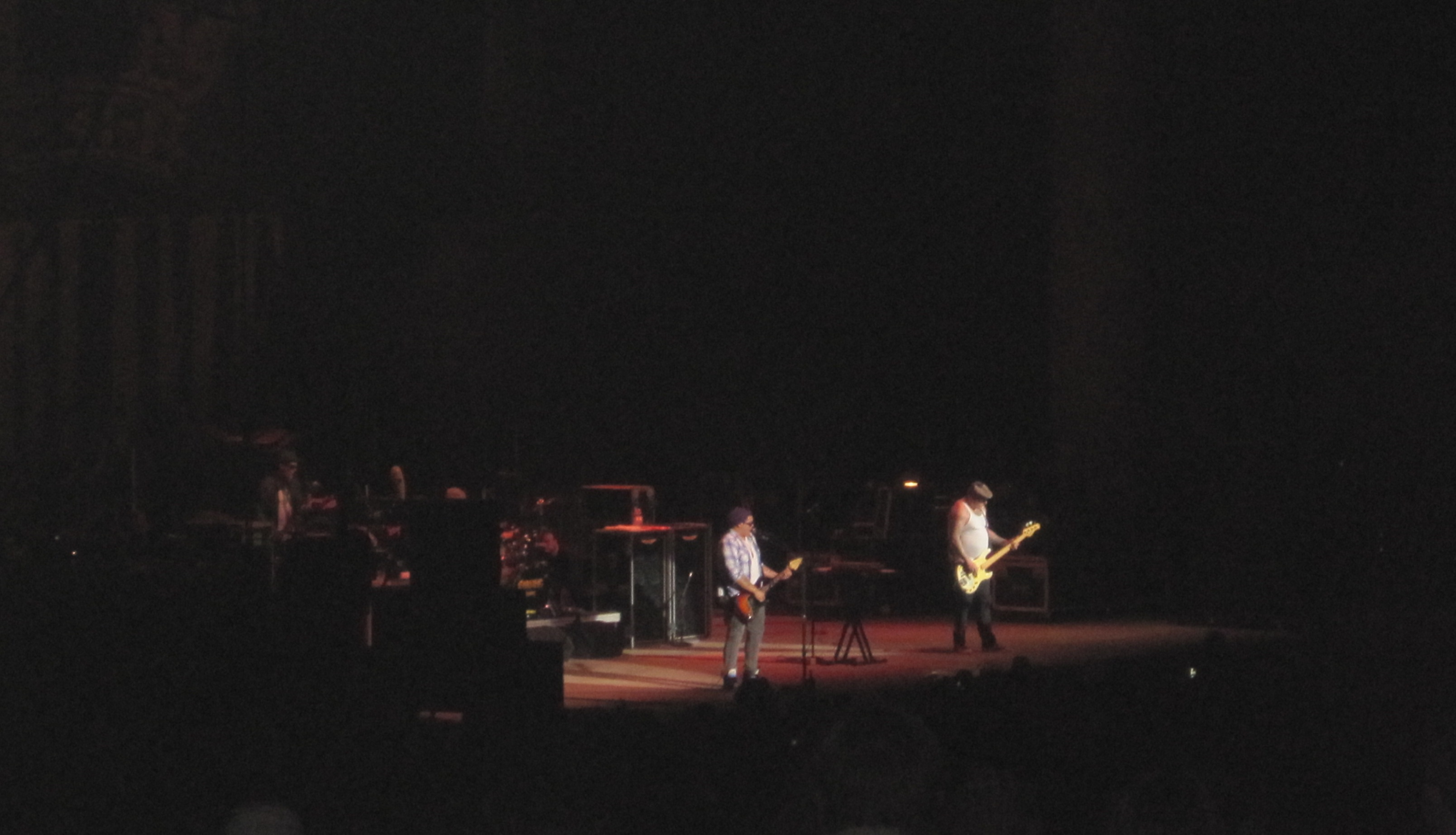
Gaugh performing with Sublime with Rome in 2010

It was announced in early 2009 that Gaugh would be reuniting with Sublime at Cantina Los Tres Hombres in Sparks, Nevada, on February 28, with new frontman and guitarist Rome Ramirez in the place of Bradley Nowell. Following positive response, the band decided to reunite properly in August 2009 for a possible tour and new album. However, not long after the October 2009 performance at Cypress Hill's Smokeout Festival, a Los Angeles judge banned the new lineup from using the Sublime name, and the band was forced to change its name. The new lineup of Eric Wilson, Bud Gaugh, and Rome Ramirez performed together as Sublime with Rome. A debut album, Yours Truly, was released on July 12, 2011.

Gaugh left Sublime with Rome on December 10, 2011 and was replaced by Josh Freese. On January 12, 2012, in an interview posted on budztv.com, Gaugh expressed regrets about touring and recording with Sublime with Rome, stating, "In hindsight I would not have used the name. I didn't want to in the first place, I was talked into it and I would like to apologize to certain people and the fans for trying to justify or talk them into it as well." When asked how it felt to play Sublime songs again, Gaugh said, "It was really good for the first few months; after that, it just felt wrong. Not playing the songs but playing them with the name Sublime, without Brad." When asked if he saw the band reuniting in the future, Gaugh replied, "No, I am done with SWR. I would be into playing music with Eric Wilson, however."

=== 2011–present: Later work and reformation of Sublime ===
Gaugh joined Jelly of the Month Club, and featured on their debut album Introducing, Jelly of the Month Club (2013). He later joined The Yamarone Brothers, described as a "Bigfoot rock band", and performed with the trio Phil and the Blanx.

In 2023, Gaugh rejoined Sublime with Jakob Nowell on vocals. They toured at Coachella and additional music festivals the following year.

== Discography ==
Sublime

- Jah Won't Pay the Bills (1991)
- 40oz. to Freedom (1992)
- Robbin' the Hood (1994)
- Sublime (1996)
- Second-hand Smoke (1997)
- Stand by Your Van (1998)
- Sublime Acoustic: Bradley Nowell & Friends (1998)
- Everything Under the Sun: Rarities (2006)
- Until the Sun Explodes (2026)

Long Beach Dub All-Stars

- Right Back (1999)
- Wonders of the World (2001)

Eyes Adrift

- Eyes Adrift (2003)

Volcano

- Volcano (2004)

Del Mar

- Demo (2007)
- After The Quake (2009)

Sublime with Rome

- Yours Truly (2011)

Jelly of the Month Club

- Introducing the Jelly of the Month Club (2013)
- Enjoy the Show (2018)

== Filmography ==
In 2016, Gaugh appeared on an episode of Finding Bigfoot, where he and long time friend James "Bobo" Fay explore the wilderness in search of bigfoot.
