= Maggie Walters =

American singer

- Born: Kansas City, Missouri, U.S.
- Instruments: Vocals, guitar, piano
- Years active: 2000–present
- Website: maggiewalters.com

Maggie Lee Walters is an American musician living in Austin, Texas. She has released two full-length albums, Maggie Walters (2005) and Midwestern Hurricane (2008).

Walters' songs "Another Living Room" and "Be Careful Love" have appeared in the NBC shows Life and Friday Night Lights, respectively.

== Career ==
Walters' first standing gig was at a Chicago bar owned by Don Gibb, who played Ogre in the 1984 film Revenge of the Nerds. It was Gibb himself who auditioned Walters and chose to feature her several nights a week. Her first demo was recorded in the bathroom of her Wrigleyville apartment on a BR-1180. These songs would later become tracks on Maggie Walters and Midwestern Hurricane.

In 2004, Walters was invited to perform at the Campus Greens Convention in Austin, Texas. In addition, a local radio DJ from KLBJ's The Dudley and Bob Show, had seen Walters play at Gibb's bar in Chicago and invited her to be a guest on his show while she was visiting. Soon after her performances at Campus Greens, Walters returned to Austin to collaborate with one of the musicians she had met on her first trip. Before her first album was complete, a few demos made it into the hands of a KGSR DJ, who began playing a rough mix of "Fingerprints" on the station regularly.

In 2005, Walters released her self-titled debut album, Maggie Walters. To mark the album's release, she played a CD release show at Austin's renowned Cactus Café. She received a four-star review from the Austin American-Statesman and gathered praise from Texas Music Magazine, the Austin Chronicle and others. Soon after, Walters was chosen as a South by Southwest showcasing act, at which time she also made appearances on such shows as KGSR's Live from the Four Seasons, KUT's Ekletikos and The Bob Edwards Show. The independent release sold out and garnered more attention from the industry. Later that year, engineer and producer Dan Workman, co-owner of Houston's SugarHill Recording Studios, approached Walters and the two recorded an EP early in 2006, in time for a second SXSW showcase. It was at this showcase where she was signed to a record label. They wished to use four of the songs from Maggie Walters on the new album, thus the original self-titled album was removed from retail and digital distributors.

To produce the new album, Walters chose the Butthole Surfers guitarist and Sublime producer Paul Leary. Walters again received support from notable musicians, including John Hagan (Lyle Lovett), Ian McLagan, and Ray Wylie Hubbard. Midwestern Hurricane was mastered by Howie Weinberg at Masterdisk in New York City. In 2008, Walters parted ways with her record label but retained the rights to the album.

In 2008, Midwestern Hurricane was released. Soon after, the other tracks from her debut album were re-released.

In 2010, Walters made an appearance on a Ray Wylie Hubbard album and announced that she would be contributing to a new album by East Bay Ray of the Dead Kennedys.

A single ("No Sex", featuring Guðrið Hansdóttir of the Faroe Islands) was released on iTunes on October 19, 2010. A video for the song was released on YouTube on February 22, 2011. The video was featured on the front page of the SXSW 2011 website.

In early 2011, Walters announced that she would be an official showcasing act of SXSW 2011. Later that year, Walters made appearances on several tracks on Sublime with Rome's debut album.

== Discography ==
Studio albums

- Maggie Walters (2005)
- Midwestern Hurricane (2008)

EPs

- The Real Life Cowboy EP (2006, also known as The SugarHill EP, The Pink EP)

== Other works and appearances ==
- The Tiny Tin Hearts - Last Flight of the Martyr Aviator (2009, editing)
- Ray Wylie Hubbard - A. Enlightenment B. Endarkenment (Hint: There is No C) (2010, vocals on tracks "Pots and Pans" and "Opium" and editing)
- Band of Heathens - Top Hat Crown & The Clapmaster's Son (2010, editing)
- Sublime with Rome - Yours Truly (2011, vocals on "You Better Listen" and other tracks)
