= Sublime with Rome =

American reggae rock band (2009–2024)

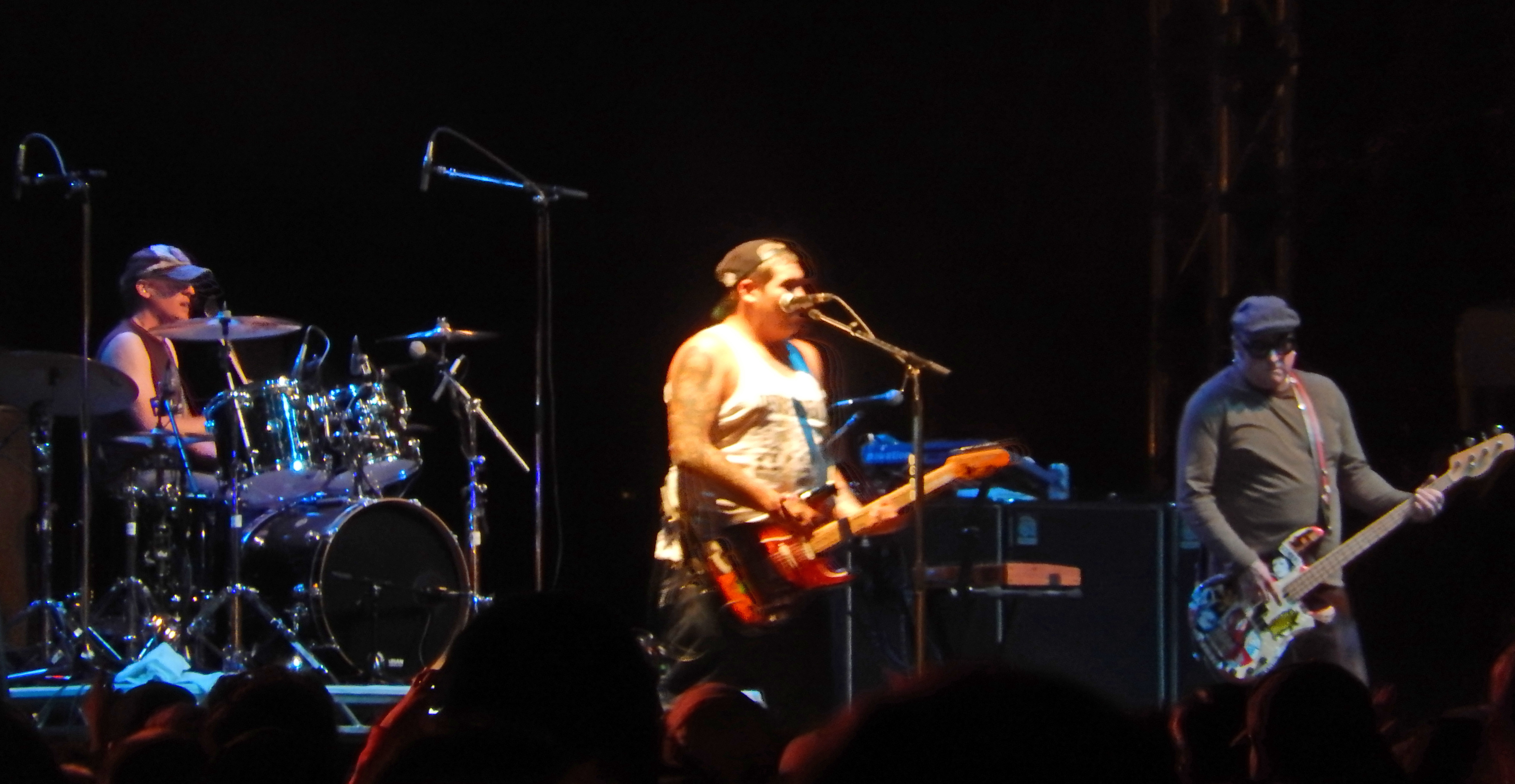
- Sublime with Rome performing in 2013

Background information
- Also known as: Sublime (2009–2010)
- Origin: Long Beach, California, United States
- Genres: Reggae rock; alternative rock; hip hop; dub; ska punk; punk rock
- Years active: 2009–2024
- Labels: Fueled by Ramen; BMG; 5 Music
- Spinoff of: Sublime
- Past members: Bud Gaugh; Eric Wilson; Rome Ramirez; Josh Freese; Carlos Verdugo; Jason Vick; Joe Tomino; Brian Allen
- Website: sublimewithrome.com

Sublime with Rome was a band that began as a musical collaboration between former Sublime members Eric Wilson and Bud Gaugh, and singer and guitarist Rome Ramirez.

Ramirez began performing with Gaugh and Wilson in 2009, where they played under the name "Sublime". The estate of late Sublime frontman Bradley Nowell issued a legal challenge to the use of the trademarked name for a venture not including Nowell. As a result, they changed their name to "Sublime with Rome" in January 2010. The group played at the 2009 Smokeout Festival and embarked on their first tour in 2010, before releasing their debut album, Yours Truly, on July 12, 2011. Gaugh left the band on December 10, 2011, and was replaced by Josh Freese. The lineup of Wilson, Ramirez and Freese recorded the group's second album Sirens, which was released in 2015. Sublime with Rome's third lineup change took place in 2017, when Carlos Verdugo replaced Freese.

In May 2019, the new trio released their first album together, and the third for Sublime With Rome, titled Blessings. The album, produced by Rob Cavallo, features the song "Wicked Heart" as the album's first single, reaching No. 34 on Billboard's Alternative Songs chart.

In 2023, Verdugo left the lineup and was briefly replaced by drummer Jason Vick before Joe Tomino of Dub Trio took over on drums just before the November release of the band's Tangerine Skies EP. A little over a month after the EP's release, Ramirez announced that he would be departing the band at the end of 2024 and moving on to focus on his solo career. On February 26, 2024, Wilson announced that he was no longer a member of Sublime with Rome. In March 2024, the band officially announced its farewell tour dates.

== History ==
=== Pre-Sublime with Rome days (1997–2009) ===
In 1997, Bud Gaugh and Eric Wilson started Long Beach Dub Allstars, their first project since Bradley Nowell's death. The band played Sublime songs as well as new material. After Long Beach Dub Allstars split up in 2002, Wilson went on to form Long Beach Shortbus, while Gaugh went on to form Eyes Adrift and Volcano (which both featured Meat Puppets guitarist/vocalist Curt Kirkwood).

In February 2009 Gaugh and Wilson reunited for a show in Sparks, Nevada at the Cantina Los Tres Hombres and called themselves Sublime. They were joined by a new singer-guitarist whose identity was not announced; on March 1, 2009, Gaugh confirmed this was then-20-year-old Northern California native Rome Ramirez, who had previously collaborated with Wilson on RAWsession where he played Sublime songs such as "Saw Red" and "Boss DJ". The trio played another show at Cypress Hill's Smokeout Festival on October 24, 2009 in San Bernardino, California. The festival also featured performances from Kottonmouth Kings, Slipknot, Deftones, Bad Brains and Pennywise.

=== Lawsuit (2009–2010) ===
On October 23, 2009, one day before the Smokeout Festival concert took place, Nowell's family and the executors of his estate threatened Gaugh and Wilson, along with Ramirez, with a lawsuit if the reconstituted band continued to use the Sublime moniker. The statement was posted to the band's official MySpace page and read as follows:

It was recently announced that Sublime bassist Eric Wilson and Sublime drummer Floyd 'Bud' Gaugh are 'reuniting' and teaming with singer and guitarist Rome Ramirez in a band they intend to call 'Sublime.' Prior to his untimely passing, both Bud and Eric acknowledged that Brad Nowell was the sole owner of the name Sublime. It was Brad's expressed intention that no one use the name Sublime in any group that did not include him, and Brad even registered the trademark 'Sublime' under his own name.

As Brad's heirs, and with the support of his entire family, we only want to respect his wishes and therefore have not consented to Bud and Eric calling their new project 'Sublime.' We have always supported Bud and Eric's musical endeavors and their desire to continue to play Sublime's music. We wholeheartedly supported Bud, Eric and the many talented members of the Sublime posse that formed the Long Beach Dub All-Stars, soon after Brad's death, to honor him through their original recordings, live performances and Sublime music until they disbanded in 2001. But, out of respect for Brad's wishes, we have always refused to endorse any group performing as 'Sublime,' and now with great reluctance feel compelled to take the appropriate legal action to protect Brad's legacy.

Our hope is that Brad's ex-bandmates will respect his wishes and find a new name to perform under, so as to enhance the 'Sublime' legacy without the confusion and disappointment that many fans have expressed upon seeing the announcement.

On November 3, 2009, a Los Angeles judge shut down an effort by the new lineup of Sublime to perform under the name. Jeremiah Reynolds, who represents the estate of original Sublime singer Bradley Nowell commented on the case:

The point we tried to make is that we encourage these gentlemen to go out and play. We think they're great musicians. We just don't think it's appropriate to call a group that doesn't have Bradley [Nowell] and has a new lead singer Sublime. It's consistent with Brad's intentions that we seek to protect the name. The court agreed that Bud and Eric and the new lead singer didn't have the right to go out and call themselves Sublime.

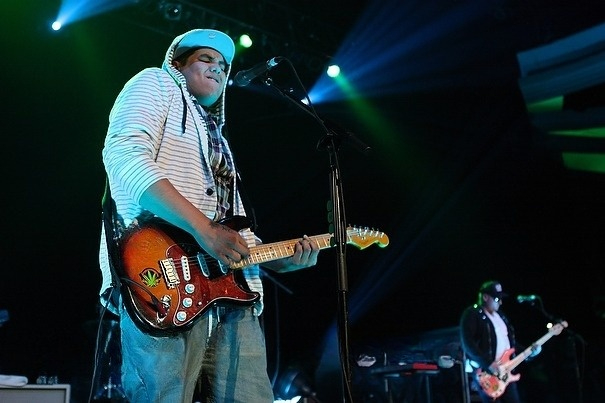
Ramirez and Wilson performing in 2010

As part of the preliminary injunction, the new lineup are said to be unable to perform or record under the name Sublime without approval and permission from the Nowell estate. A spokesman for Gaugh and Wilson declined to comment. Thomas Brackey, who represents the surviving Sublime members, did not return calls. The injunction is dependent upon a bond of $125,000 being posted in the event it is later determined that the defendants – the surviving Sublime members – suffered damages as a result of the ruling. Reynolds said the bond would be posted. Gaugh and Wilson issued the following statement:

Our goal continues to be sharing the music and message of Sublime with all of our fans around the world. We intend to take the court's advice and work on a business solution to this issue. We hope the estate follows suit so the music of Sublime can live on and be accessible to everyone.

In January 2010, the dispute was settled and it was announced that the new lineup of Ramirez, Wilson and Gaugh would perform together under Sublime with Rome.

=== Subsequent touring and Yours Truly (2010–2011) ===
Asked in October 2009 about the future of the project, Gaugh replied:

It'd be great to get back into the studio and make some new music. It'd be great to tour again. But we're taking it a step at a time and as long as each step feels good, then we'll keep on going. One major project under development that we're psyched about is code-named "Brad's House." The idea is to provide free addiction recovery service to underprivileged teens in Brad's honor. The entire Sublime family was devastated by Brad's loss and we would like to help prevent that from happening to others. The band has agreed to allocate proceeds to get this started. We'll begin with one facility but our hope is that we can get other bands and organizations to join us and we can eventually scale it all across the country.

In February 2010, the band confirmed numerous North American dates, as well as plans to tour Europe in May. However, as of June 2010, a European tour in May never came to fruition. Sublime with Rome live shows include Todd Forman on sax and keyboards; Forman was the original sax player on past Sublime studio albums.

Gaugh told Billboard.com that new material from Sublime with Rome was in the cards. The trio wrote three new songs when it first started playing together in February 2009, including one, "Panic", that was performed at all three shows they had done so far. He explained, "We're gonna continue working on material as we're on the road. It's not without question to have a studio in one of the buses while we're on tour. We do a lot of our best creativity on stage, so we'll be trying out new stuff for the fans, even before we go into the studio."

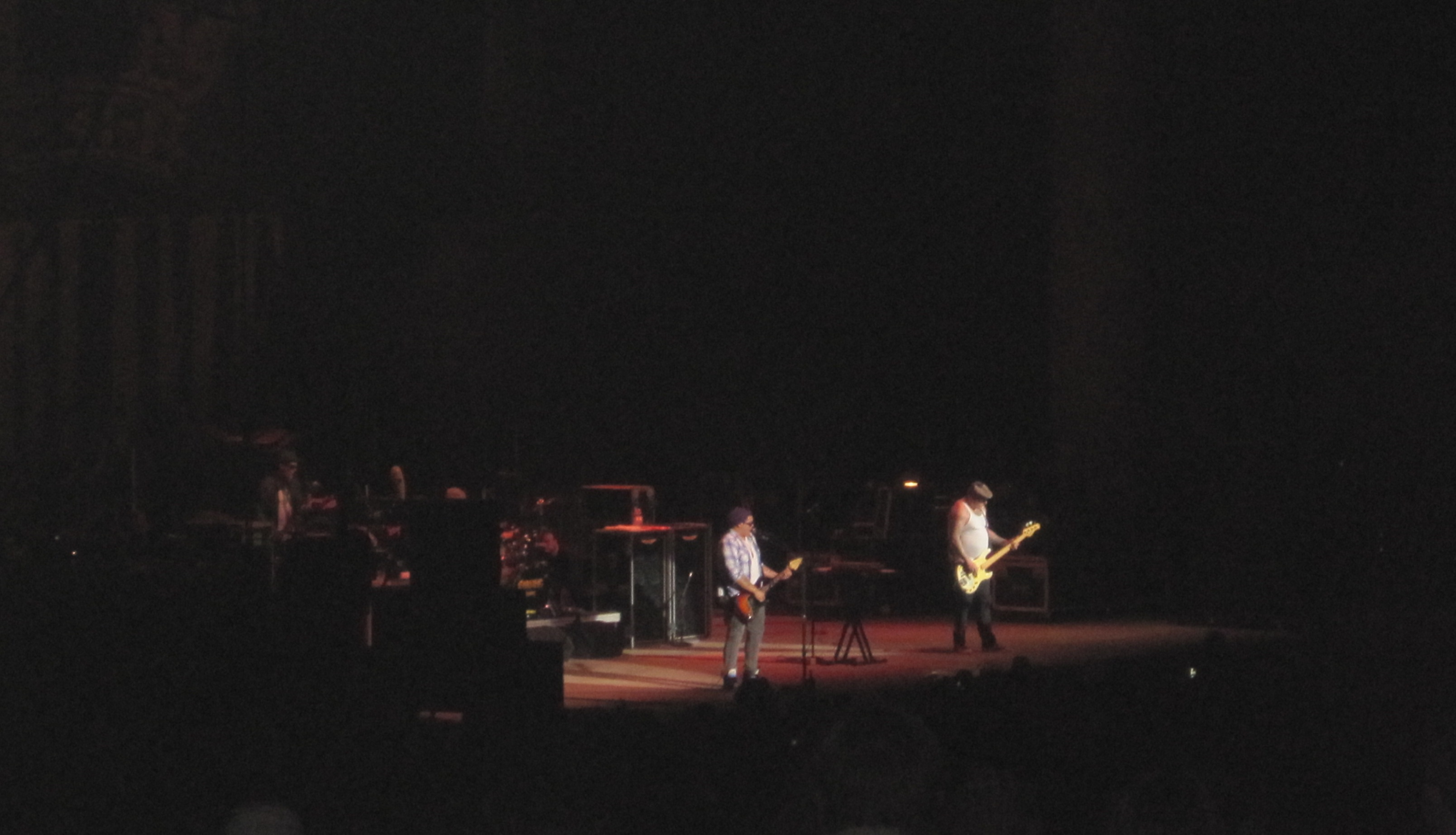
Sublime with Rome performing in Noblesville, Indiana on September 11, 2010

In May 2010, Gaugh revealed to Billboard.com that Sublime with Rome would enter the studio in June for a week "and nail down some of the more worked-out songs, and possibly even finish one or two of them for a late summer radio release". The band was expected to have the album out in 2011. On February 5, 2011, Sublime with Rome announced on their official website that they were planning to enter the studio in March to begin recording their debut album, with Butthole Surfers guitarist Paul Leary producing. Ramirez had said several collaborations were being considered. "There will be special guests and some collaborations as well, like one with Aimee Allen."

On February 21, 2011, the band posted a statement on their Facebook page saying that they had begun recording the album and would be posting "mad videos" to "let everyone know where to go for a behind the scenes look at the Sublime with Rome process." On April 14, 2011, Ramirez posted an update on Sublime with Rome's official website saying that the album was almost finished and projected a summer release. During the summer 2010 tour, Sublime with Rome performed their first new song "Panic" on Jimmy Kimmel Live!. It was also announced that Sublime with Rome officially signed to record label Fueled by Ramen and released their debut album Yours Truly on July 12, 2011.

=== Gaugh's departure and Sirens (2011–2016) ===
On December 10, 2011, at the KROQ Almost Acoustic Christmas, the band announced that it would be the last performance with drummer Bud Gaugh, who would be leaving the group to spend more time with his family as he was expecting a child. Josh Freese filled in for some performances on a temporary basis, before officially joining the band. On January 12, 2012, in an interview posted on budztv.com, Gaugh expressed regrets about touring and recording with Sublime with Rome stating:

In hindsight I would not have used the name. I didn't want to in the first place, I was talked into it and I would like to apologize to certain people and the fans for trying to justify or talk them into it as well. The recording was awkward, It felt rushed, felt like I was playing someone else's parts/songs. Other than "Panic", "Paper Cuts", and "Safe and Sound", it pretty much was. Some of the parts that were added after the fact really ruined some of the songs for me, for my liking. I also never agreed to do extensive touring for three years straight so that soured me on this thing.

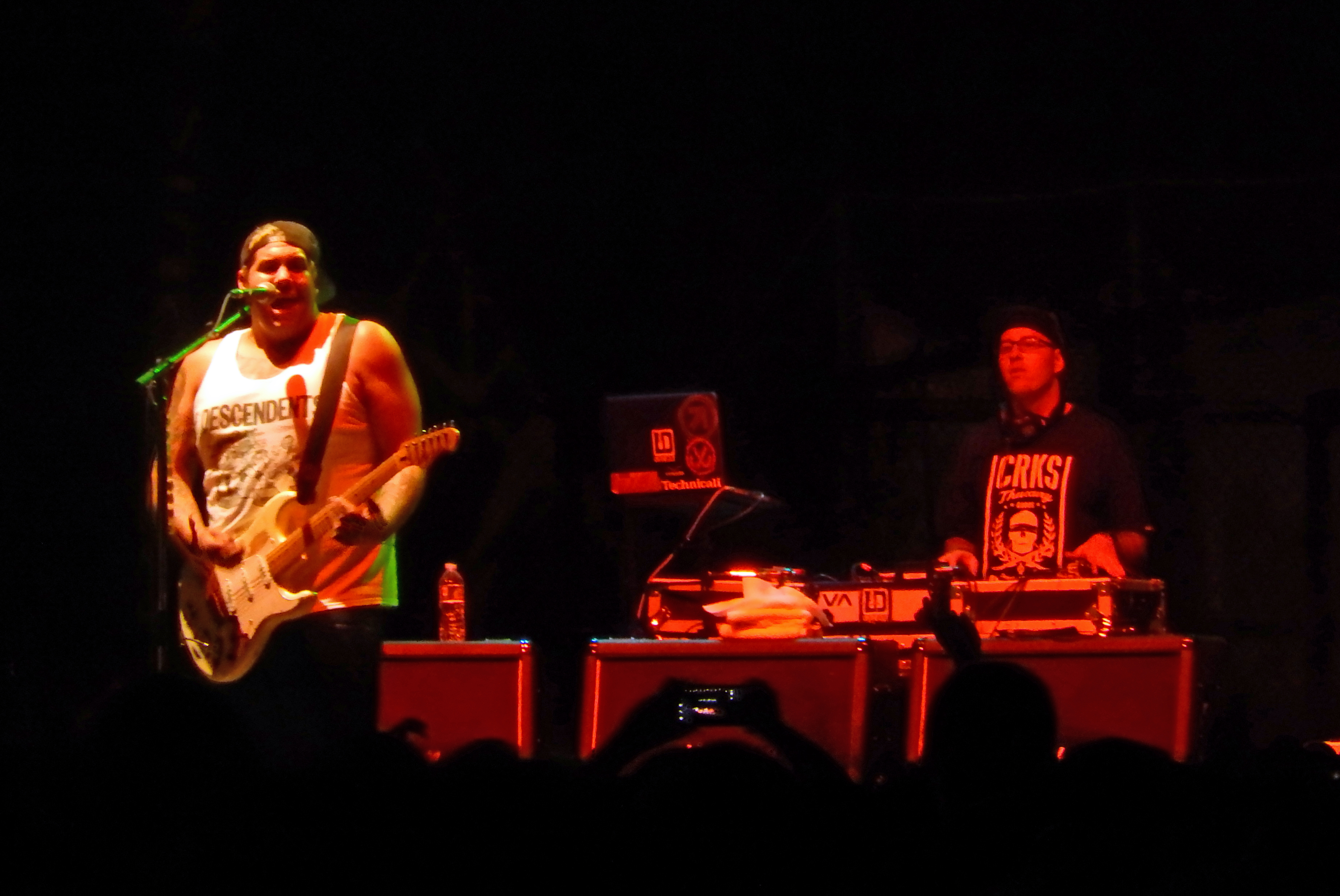
Ramirez and DJ Leigh Snyder performing with the band in 2013

When asked if he saw the band reuniting in the future Gaugh replied, "No, I am done with SWR. I would be into playing music with Eric Wilson, however." When asked how it felt to play Sublime songs again, Gaugh said, "It was really good for the first few months, after that, it just felt wrong. Not playing the songs but playing them with the name Sublime, without Brad."

Despite this, Sublime with Rome continued to tour, with Josh Freese taking Gaugh's place.

By 2013, Sublime with Rome was expected to return to the studio to record their second album. On May 13, 2015, the first single from then-upcoming album Sirens, titled "Wherever You Go", was released on YouTube. A second single was released on YouTube and iTunes, titled "Sirens (Feat. The Dirty Heads)", on June 29, 2015. Sirens was released on July 17, 2015.

=== Blessings and farewell tour (2017–2024) ===
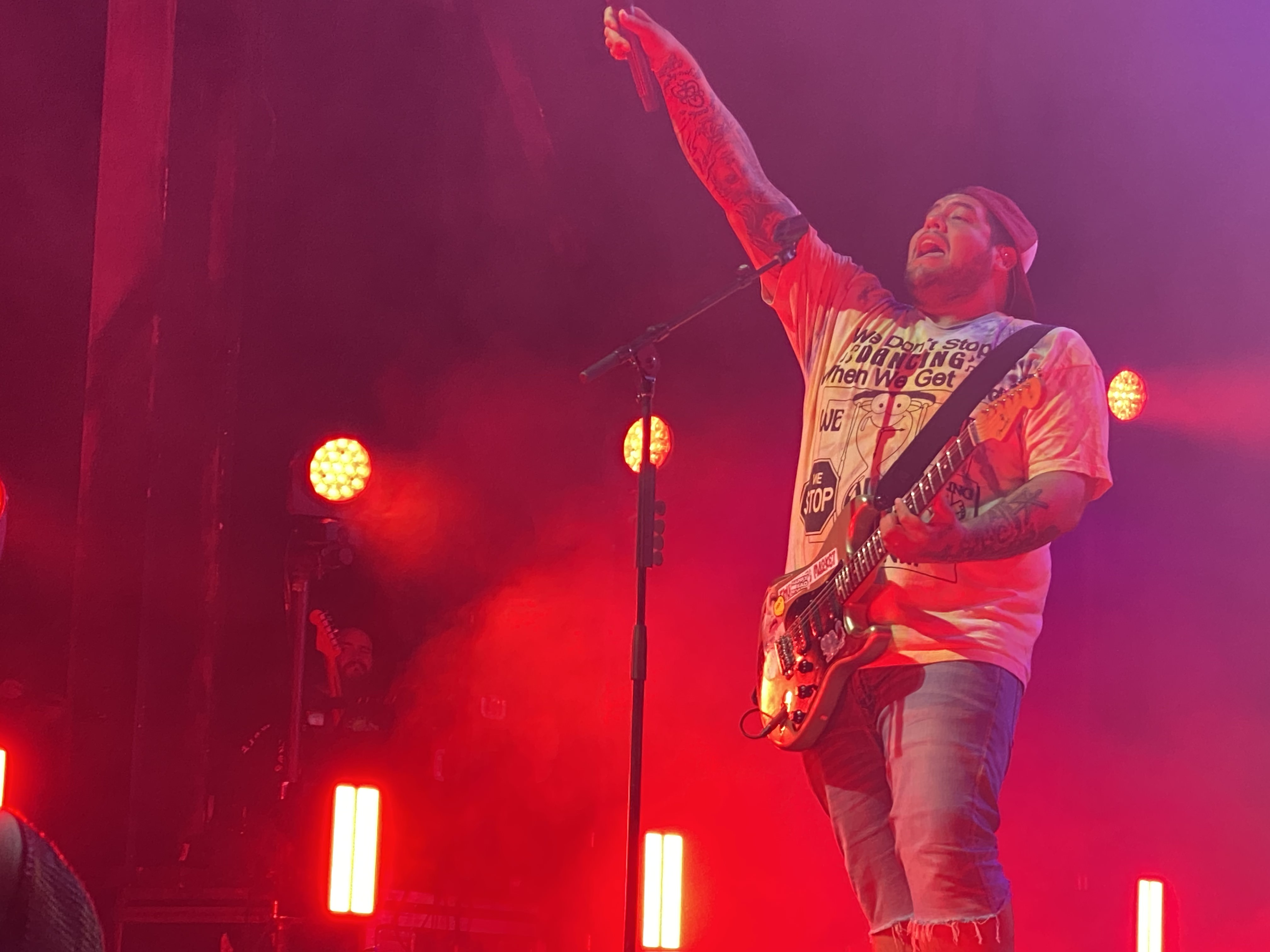
Ramirez performing with Sublime with Rome on the High and Mighty Tour at Coney Island in 2021.

In early 2017, Josh Freese was replaced by former Tribal Seeds drummer Carlos Verdugo. Soon after, the band announced a North American summer tour with The Offspring and The Menzingers. The band's third album, Blessings was produced by Rob Cavallo and released through Red Music in 2019. Ramirez said of the album, "A lot of these songs really came from honestly me being in a spot where I wanted to just write all the lyrics upfront first and focus on what I wanted to say. I just got married, I was having my first child. Things were starting to change for my life; I stopped drinking hard alcohol. Everything was starting to come into focus for this for the next chapter."

During the band's Summertime 2023 tour with Slightly Stoopid, Sublime with Rome performed with new drummer, Jason Vick. After the tour, yet another new drummer, Joe Tomino of Dub Trio, joined the band. In September, the band released a statement that due to a shoulder injury Wilson sustained during the summer tour, Stu Brooks of Dub Trio and Tony Kanal of No Doubt would alternate playing bass for the band's scheduled dates. The band's Tangerine Skies EP was released on November 3, 2023.

On December 11, Wilson and Gaugh reunited to perform with Jakob Nowell as Sublime during a benefit show for Bad Brains vocalist H.R. at the Teragram Ballroom in Los Angeles. One week later, on December 18, Ramirez announced that he would be departing Sublime with Rome at the end of 2024 and moving on to focus on his solo career. The next day, Ramirez announced that the band had to postpone their scheduled 2023 performances in New Zealand due to "unforeseen circumstances" but promised to reschedule the dates for 2024.

On February 26, 2024, Wilson announced via Instagram that he was no longer performing with Sublime with Rome and would only be performing with Sublime, which would continue with Jakob Nowell on lead vocals. On March 4, 2024, the band officially announced its farewell tour with Tomino on drums and Brian Allen replacing Wilson on bass.

On April 5, 2024, the band announced their fourth and final studio album, Sublime with Rome, along with the release of its lead single, "Love is Dangerous". The album was released on May 10, 2024. By the end of 2024, the band split up.

== Members ==
Former members

- Rome Ramirez – lead vocals, guitar (2009–2024)
- **Eric Wilson** – bass, backing vocals, keyboards (2009–2024)
- **Bud Gaugh** – drums, percussion (2009–2011)
- Josh Freese – drums, percussion (2011–2017)
- Carlos Verdugo – drums, percussion (2017–2023)
- Jason Vick – drums, percussion (2023)
- Joe Tomino – drums, percussion (2023–2024)
- Brian Allen – bass, backing vocals (2024)

Touring members

- **Todd Forman** – saxophone, keyboards, auxiliary percussion (2009–2011)
- DJ Rocky Rock – turntables, samples (2011)
- Leigh "LDontheCut" Snyder – turntables, samples (2012–2023)
- Gabrial McNair – keyboards, trombone, backing vocals (2017–2024)
- Tony Kanal – bass, keyboards (2023)
- Stu Brooks – bass, keyboards (2023)

Note: Members and collaborators of original Sublime are in Bold

Timeline

== Tours ==
- Sublime with Rome Tour (2010)
- 311 Unity Tour (2011)
- Sublime with Rome/Cypress Hill/Pepper Tour (2012)
- Sublime with Rome/Rebelution/Pepper Summer Tour (2015)
- Sublime with Rome Summer Tour (2016)
- Sublime with Rome/The Offspring Summer Tour (2017)
- SOJA and Sublime With Rome Summer Tour (2019)
- Dirty Heads/Sublime with Rome: High and Mighty Tour (2021)
- Incubus with Very Special Guest Sublime with Rome and The Aquadolls (2022)
- Summertime Tour with Slightly Stoopid, Atmosphere, and The Movement (2023)
- Farewell Tour (2024)

== Discography ==
=== Studio albums ===
List of studio albums, with selected details and chart positions
Title	Details	Peak chart positions		
Title	Details	US	US Rock	US Indie
Yours Truly	Released: July 12, 2011; Label: Fueled by Ramen; Formats: CD, digital download	9	3	—
Sirens	Released: July 17, 2015; Label: BMG; Formats: CD, digital download	34	3	5
Blessings	Released: May 31, 2019; Label: 5 Music; Formats: CD, digital download	—	—	—
Sublime with Rome	Released: May 10, 2024; Label: 5 Music; Formats: CD, digital download	—	—	—
"—" denotes releases that did not chart

=== Singles ===
List of singles, with selected chart positions
Title	Year	Peak chart positions			Album
Title	Year	US Alt.	US Rock	CAN Alt.	Album
"Panic"	2011	4	10	11	Yours Truly
"Take It or Leave It"	2011	23	37	—	Yours Truly
"Wherever You Go"	2015	17	—	—	Sirens
"Wicked Heart"	2018	34	—	—	Blessings
"Love is Dangerous"	2024	—	—	—	Sublime with Rome

=== Songs ===
Title	Release date	Album
"Can You Feel It"	2011	Yours Truly
"Lover's Rock"	2011	Yours Truly
"Murdera"	2011	Yours Truly
"My World"	2011	Yours Truly
"Only"	2011	Yours Truly
"Panic"	2011	Yours Truly
"Paper Cuts"	2011	Yours Truly
"PCH"	2011	Yours Truly
"Safe and Sound"	2011	Yours Truly
"Same Old Situation"	2011	Yours Truly
"Spun"	2011	Yours Truly
"Take It or Leave It"	2011	Yours Truly
"Your Better Listen"	2011	Yours Truly
"Been Losing Sleep"	2015	Sirens
"Brazila"	2015	Sirens
"House Party"	2015	Sirens
"Promise Land Dub"	2015	Sirens
"Sirens"	2015	Sirens
"Wherever You Go"	2015	Sirens
"Santeria" (Live)	2016	Jam in the Van (Live Session)
"Skankin to the Beat" (Live)	2016	Jam in the Van (Live Session)
"Wherever You Go" (Live)	2016	Jam in the Van (Live Session)
"Wicked Heart"	2018	Blessings
"Blackout"	2019	Blessings
"Blessings"	2019	Blessings
"For The Night"	2019	Blessings
"Goodbyes"	2019	Blessings
"Light On"	2019	Blessings
"May Day"	2019	Blessings
"Spiderweb"	2019	Blessings
"Thank U"	2019	Blessings
"Wild Fire"	2019	Blessings
"Cool & Collected" (feat. Slightly Stoopid)	July 28, 2023	Tangerine Skies EP (Single)
"All I Need"	September 22, 2023	Tangerine Skies EP (Single)
"Tangerine Skies"	November 3, 2023	Tangerine Skies EP
"Battle Scar"	November 3, 2023	Tangerine Skies EP
