= Win a Date with Tad Hamilton! =

2004 film by Robert Luketic

- Theatrical release poster
- Directed by: Robert Luketic
- Written by: Victor Levin
- Produced by: Lucy Fisher; Douglas Wick
- Starring: Kate Bosworth; Topher Grace; Josh Duhamel; Sean Hayes; Nathan Lane
- Cinematography: Peter Collister
- Edited by: Scott Hill
- Music by: Edward Shearmur
- Production company: Red Wagon Entertainment
- Distributed by: DreamWorks Pictures
- Release date: January 23, 2004
- Running time: 96 minutes
- Country: United States
- Language: English
- Budget: $22 million
- Box office: $21.3 million

Win a Date with Tad Hamilton! is a 2004 American romantic comedy film directed by Robert Luketic, written by Victor Levin and starring Kate Bosworth, Topher Grace, Josh Duhamel, Gary Cole, Ginnifer Goodwin, Sean Hayes and Nathan Lane. The film follows a small-town girl (Bosworth) who wins a contest for a date with a male celebrity (Duhamel) and a love triangle forms between the girl, the star, and the girl's best friend (Grace).

Win a Date with Tad Hamilton! was released by DreamWorks Pictures on January 23, 2004. The film received mixed reviews from critics and earned $17.1 million in the United States and $4.2 million overseas for a worldwide total of $21.3 million, making it a commercial failure against a $22 million budget.

== Plot ==
A soldier and nurse emerge from two 1940s-style cars in the middle of the night. As the nurse runs up to the soldier, the camera switches, revealing that this is a film scene.

Rosalee, Cathy, and Pete; Piggly Wiggly store workers in Fraziers Bottom, West Virginia, are watching the film. As the nurse asks for forgiveness and the soldier agrees, the women in the audience are moved to tears, as Pete is clearly unimpressed.

As the ladies wonder what the film's star, Tad Hamilton, is doing at that moment, Tad is described by his agent as, "drinking, driving, smoking, leering and groping all at the same time."

The agent tells Tad that his hedonism is damaging his reputation and career opportunities. To improve his image and convince a film director to cast him, his agents establish a competition to win a date with Tad, with proceeds benefiting the charity Save the Children. Rosalee finds an online advertisement for the competition.

With the help of the Piggly Wiggly customers, and a reluctant Pete, Cathy, and Rosalee raise the $100.00 entrance fee as Pete tells his superior that he will leave for college in Richmond, after he talks "with someone about going to Richmond with me."

A news crew arrives outside Rosalee's home because she has won the date with Tad. A despondent Pete accompanies her to the airport. Awed by Los Angeles, Rosalee becomes tongue-tied in Tad's presence. The date does not go well; Rosalee vomits in the limousine, and when Tad mentions his love of animals, which Pete had warned was a signal of sexual intentions, her suspicions are raised. After seeing Tad's house, Rosalee requests to return to the hotel and soon returns home, leaving Tad thoughtful.

Pete is about to tell Rosalee about moving to Richmond when she is surprised by Tad's sudden arrival. Although she is still cynical, when he admits to not having "his priorities straight," she is convinced of his good intentions.

On a phone call with his agent, Tad insists that he wants to turn over a new leaf and won't return to Los Angeles for a while. When he gathers Rosalee for a date, he leaves a positive impression on Rosalee's father, who had studied hard for the encounter. Pete tries to stop their date by reporting them for illegally parking, and tries to convince Rosalee that Tad is using her. Despite all of Pete's efforts, Rosalee and Tad grow close over the next few days.

In a bar, Pete corners Tad in the men's room. After conceding that Rosalee is in love with Tad, Pete tells him that she is more than a "wholesome small town girl," but a wonderful person with "the kind of beauty a guy only sees once." He explains her six smiles that reveal her emotions.

Pete makes Tad swear not to break Rosalee's heart. When Rosalee is in Tad's hotel room, his agents appear and inform him that the director has cast him in the film. Tad is overjoyed and convinces Rosalee to accompany him to Los Angeles by employing Pete's "six smiles" speech.

After a rousing speech about great love by Angelica, a barmaid with a crush on him, Pete rushes to Rosalee's, confessing his love. She is confused and resolves to still travel to California with Tad. On the plane, Tad fails to identify one of Rosalee's smiles and then confesses his lie, prompting her to return home.

Rosalee runs to Piggly Wiggly and to Pete's, where Angelica tells her how Pete feels and that he is going to Richmond to escape his heartbreak. Rosalee then drives furiously toward Richmond to find Pete. In a manner similar to that of the opening scene, Rosalee and Pete exit their cars and Pete asks her to dance.

== Cast ==
- Kate Bosworth as Rosalee Futch
- Topher Grace as Pete Monash
- Josh Duhamel as Tad Hamilton
- Gary Cole as Henry Futch
- Ginnifer Goodwin as Cathy Feely
- Sean Hayes as Richard Levy the Shameless
- Nathan Lane as Richard Levy the Driven
- Kathryn Hahn as Angelica
- Octavia Spencer as Janine
- Amy Smart (cameo) as Nurse Betty
- Stephen Tobolowsky as George Ruddy
- Moon Bloodgood as Gorgeous Woman
- Mary Jo Smith as Sonja
- Joseph Convery as Mickey (Tad's driver)
- Deena Dill as Reporter
- Bob Glouberman as Rosalee's limo driver
- Jay Underwood as Policeman Tom
- Sam Pancake as Hotel Clerk
- Patrick O'Brien as Father Newell
- Willow Bay as herself
- Todd Eckert as Maitre D'
- David Wolrod as Roger Bodger
- Jessy Moss as herself
- Marshall Goodman as himself
- Danny Weissfeld as himself
- Caleb Speir as himself
- Jordana Brewster (uncredited) as Actress (deleted scene)
- Paris Hilton (uncredited) as Heather (deleted scene)
- Bonnie McKee (uncredited) as herself

== Production ==
Win a Date with Tad Hamilton! was based on a script by Victor Levin. The character's name of Tad Hamilton has been seen as a cross between the names of screen idols Tab Hunter and George Hamilton.

It was the second U.S. film by Australian director Robert Luketic, who found success in 2001 with his American directorial debut Legally Blonde. The film was shot between May and July 2003. The film featured a small cameo from Australian musician Jessy Moss, in addition to using the song "Telling You Now", from Moss's debut album Street Knuckles (2003). This was done to cross-promote her, as she had recently signed to DreamWorks Records, then a sister division to the film's distributor DreamWorks Pictures. However, by the time the film was released, DreamWorks Records was no longer part of the same corporate umbrella, as Universal Music Group announced they were purchasing it for $100 million in November 2003, eventually closing it down in 2005. In the credits of the film, Moss's song is listed as being under license from Universal Music, since the rights to her album had already been transferred to Universal Music Group by that point.

Filming took place in both West Virginia and California. The film intended to evoke a small town feeling, and the town in the movie, Fraziers Bottom, was inspired by the real-life West Virginia community of the same name. Other West Virginia shooting locations included Fayetteville and Grandview, with some additional filming at the London Locks on the Kanawha River. The film's Hollywood scenes were shot in California. These locations included the Los Angeles Convention Center, which was used to portray Los Angeles International Airport, as well as several sites in Malibu and West Hollywood.

== Reception ==
=== Box office ===
The film opened in 2,711 venues on January 23, 2004, and earned $7,320,066 in its opening weekend, ranking third in the North American box office and second among the week's new releases. The film ultimately grossed $17,071,962 in North America and $4,206,494 internationally for a worldwide total of $21,278,456. Based on a $22 million budget, the film was a box-office bomb.

=== Critical response ===
Win a Date with Tad Hamilton! received mixed reviews from critics. On Rotten Tomatoes, the film received a 55% approval rating based on 149 reviews, with an average of 5.60/10. The site's consensus states: "Formulaic romantic comedy works better than it should thanks to a charming cast." Metacritic reports a score of 52 out of 100 based on 35 reviews, indicating "mixed or average reviews". Audiences polled by CinemaScore gave the film an average grade of "B+" on an A+ to F scale.

Roger Ebert criticized the film, noting that Duhamel's character always seems more likeable than Grace's, and that the film spends more time building a romance between Rosalee and Tad rather than between Rosalee and Pete. Bosworth's acting was praised for holding the film together.

Carla Meyer of the San Francisco Chronicle regarded the film as tonally inconsistent in its attempt to be both an old-fashioned romantic comedy and modern (albeit gentle) satire.

Writing in The New York Times, Stephen Holden regarded the film's plot as resembling those of the 1950s, "dressed up just enough to seem contemporary." Holden regarded Bosworth's role as the toughest, as she showed Rosalee's "feet-on-the-ground optimism and innate wisdom" easily.

== Home media ==
The film was released on VHS and DVD by DreamWorks Home Entertainment on April 20, 2004. The DVD features 16 deleted scenes. In February 2006, Viacom (now known as Paramount Skydance) acquired the rights to Win a Date with Tad Hamilton! and all 58 other live-action films DreamWorks had released since 1997, following its $1.6 billion acquisition of the company's live-action film and television assets. It was later made available on Paramount's streaming service Paramount+, and on April 22, 2022, Paramount Home Entertainment released it on Blu-ray.

== Soundtrack ==
The film's soundtrack album was released on January 20, 2004. The release was handled by Columbia Records rather than DreamWorks' own record label DreamWorks Records, which had recently been sold to Universal Music Group. Columbia also handled the soundtrack for 2005's Just like Heaven, another DreamWorks film released following UMG's takeover of DreamWorks Records.

=== Album track listing ===
1. "Superfabulous (Scott Humphrey Remix)" - BT
2. "Special" - Wilshire
3. "Some Days" - Wheat
4. "More Bounce in California" - Soul Kid #1
5. "Why Can't I?" - Liz Phair
6. "Back to You" - John Mayer
7. "Something About You" - Five for Fighting
8. "Days Go By" - Jason Wade
9. "Leading with My Heart" - Alice Peacock
10. "Blue" - The Thorns
11. "Waiting" - Kyle Riabko
12. "I Won't Go Hollywood" - Bleu
13. "Somebody" - Bonnie McKee
14. "Shining" - Kristian Leontiou
15. "Once Again" - Frankie Jordan

=== Other songs ===
The following songs are featured within the film, but weren't included for Columbia's soundtrack album:

- "Once Again" - Lina
- "Whatever Happened to My Rock N' Roll" - Black Rebel Motorcycle Club
- "MMMnn" - Grandadbob
- "Can't Get Enough of Your Love, Babe" - Barry White
- "Telling You Now" - Jessy Moss
- "All I Ever Ask" - Colin Blades
- "Going Back to Cali" - Anti-Matter
- "California Sun" - Jem
- "Song for Pete" - Jason Wade
