= Right Back (album) =

Studio album by Long Beach Dub Allstars
- Released: September 28, 1999
- Studio: Long View Farm, North Brookfield, MA
- Genre: Dub
- Length: 42:04
- Label: DreamWorks; Skunk
- Producer: Field Marshall; Michael "Miguel" Happoldt; Eddie Ashworth

Long Beach Dub Allstars chronology
| Right Back (1999) | Wonders of the World (2001) |

Right Back is the debut album by Long Beach Dub Allstars, released September 28, 1999, through DreamWorks Records. It was followed by the album Wonders of the World, in 2001.

"Saw Red" is a cover of a Barrington Levy song, "She's Mine".

== Critical reception ==
Professional ratings
Review scores
| Source | Rating |
|---|---|
| AllMusic | 3/5 stars |
| Entertainment Weekly | C+ |
| Kerrang! | 4/5 stars |
| Punknews.org | 2.5/5 stars |
| The Village Voice | (dud) |

Exclaim! wrote that "Eric Wilson's bass lines and the background scratching provided by 'The Field Marshall' (Goodman) will make you feel the need to pop in your old recordings of 40 Oz. To Freedom or Robbin' the Hood."

== Track listing ==
| No. | Title | Length |
|---|---|---|
| 1. | "Righteous Dub" (featuring Barrington Levy) | 2:54 |
| 2. | "Rosarito" | 3:08 |
| 3. | "My Own Life" | 2:57 |
| 4. | "Fugazi" | 3:37 |
| 5. | "New Sun" (featuring HR) | 3:37 |
| 6. | "Kick Down" (featuring Dangr) | 4:43 |
| 7. | "Like a Dog" | 3:33 |
| 8. | "Sensi" (featuring Tippa Irie) | 3:57 |
| 9. | "Trailer Ras" | 3:21 |
| 10. | "Pass It On" (featuring Half Pint) | 3:29 |
| 11. | "Soldiers" | 3:15 |
| 12. | "Saw Red (She's Mine)" (featuring Barrington Levy) | 3:33 |
| Total length: | | 42:04 |

== Guest artists ==
This album features many additional artists, including:

- Barrington Levy, performing on "Righteous Dub" & "Saw Red"
- H.R., performing on "New Sun"
- Dangr, performing on "Kick Down"
- Tippa Irie, performing on "Sensi"
- Half-Pint, performing on "Pass It On"
- Fletcher Dragge, guitarist of Pennywise (band), performing on "My Own Life"

== Credits ==
- Eric Wilson: bass
- Bud Gaugh: drums
- Marshall Goodman: drums on 6, 7, 10, and 11, turntables, percussion, and programming
- Opie Ortiz: lead vocals on 3, 6, 7, and 11
- RAS-1: electric guitars, and lead vocals on 2, 4, 7, and 9
- Jack Maness: keyboards, organ, and background vocals
- Tim Wu: sax and flute
- Mixed by: Miguel, Eddie Ashworth, and Field Marshall
- Engineered by: Eddie Ashworth and Miguel Engineers: Rob "Smokey" Soto, and Jessy Moss
- Production Assistant: Jessica Sickle So songs tracked at Record 2, Mendocino, California
- Mastered by Eddy Shreyer at Oasis
- Layout: Opie Ortiz and Donald Stodden
- Artwork: Opie Ortiz and Joe Salamanca
- Art Coordination: Mary Fagot
- Executive Producers: Floyd Gaugh IV, Michael Happoldt, and Eric Wilson
