= Date rape (disambiguation) =

Date rape is a rape in which there has been some sort of romantic or potentially sexual relationship between the two parties.

Date rape may refer to:

- Date rape drug, an incapacitating agent that may be used to commit rape
- "Date Rape" (song) by the band Sublime
- Daterape, an album by Thighpaulsandra
