= Maggie Walters (album) =

Studio album by Maggie Walters
- Released: February 14, 2005
- Genre: Indie rock, indie folk, Americana
- Length: 42:55
- Label: Independent

Maggie Walters chronology
Maggie Walters (2005)	Midwestern Hurricane (2008)

Maggie Walters is the first studio album by American musician Maggie Walters. The album was released in February 14, 2005.

== History and re-release ==
This album was recorded independently by Walters before she had been signed to a record label. When Walters was approached with a record deal, the record company wished to use four of the songs from Maggie Walters on the new album, but planned to have them reworked or remixed. Walters agreed to the terms of the contract, and as a result, the original self-titled album was removed from stores and digital distribution, and was not to be replicated or sold again.

Walters eventually left the record label while retaining the rights to the album she recorded while signed with them (Midwestern Hurricane), partially due to the fact that four of the songs on it came from her original first album.

Subsequently, five of the other tracks from Maggie Walters were re-released in 2008, digitally only. These tracks were "Spin", "Another Living Room", "The Other Spin", "Flash" and "Shades of Gray."

The album was later released in its entirety on iTunes.

== Track listing ==
1. Fingerprints - 5:02
2. Be Careful Love - 3:59
3. Spin - 4:46
4. Ann Marie Explained it All - 3:38
5. Another Living Room - 3:22
6. The Other Spin - 4:29
7. Sundays - 3:34
8. Gibraltar - 4:32
9. Flash - 3:39
10. Shades of Gray - 5:54
