= 40oz. to Freedom =

Studio album by Sublime
- Released: June 1, 1992
- Recorded: 1991–1992
- Studio: Mambo in Long Beach, California
- Genres: Ska punk; reggae rock
- Length: 75:22 (cassette version); 73:48 (compact disc version)
- Labels: Skunk; MCA
- Producers: Sublime; Miguel; Elephant Levitation

Sublime chronology
Jah Won't Pay the Bills (1991)	40oz. to Freedom (1992)	Robbin' the Hood (1994)

Singles from 40oz. to Freedom
- 1. "Date Rape" Released: 1991; 2. "Badfish" Released: 1993

40oz. to Freedom is the debut studio album by American ska punk band Sublime, released on June 1, 1992, on Skunk Records. It was later reissued by MCA. 40oz. to Freedom's sound blended various forms of Jamaican music, including ska ("Date Rape"), rocksteady ("54-46 That's My Number"), roots reggae ("Smoke Two Joints"), and dub ("Let's Go Get Stoned", "D.J.s") along with hardcore punk ("New Thrash", "Hope") and hip-hop (as in "Live at E's").

40oz. to Freedom received mixed reviews from critics upon release, but has since earned an improved public perception. Sublime would not achieve any mainstream success until the release of their self-titled album in 1996, two months after the death of Bradley Nowell. As of 2011, the album has certified sales of two million copies in the US. It is Sublime's second bestselling studio album there; the self-titled album leads with six million. Along with the Offspring's album Smash, 40oz. to Freedom is one of the highest-selling independently released albums of all time.

== Background ==
At the age of sixteen, Bradley Nowell began playing guitar and started his first band, Hogan's Heroes, with Michael Yates and Eric Wilson, who would later become Sublime's bassist. At first, Wilson did not share Nowell's interest in reggae music. Nowell recalled the experience: "I was trying to get them to do (UB40's version of) 'Cherry Oh Baby', and it didn't work. They tried, but it just sounded like such garbage. We were horrible."

In 1990, music student Michael "Miguel" Happoldt approached the band, offering to let the band record in the studio at the school where Happoldt was studying. The band enthusiastically agreed and broke into the school at night, where they recorded from midnight to seven in the morning. The recording session resulted in the popular cassette tape called Jah Won't Pay the Bills, which was released in 1991. The tape helped the band gain a grassroots following throughout Southern California. Using the same tactics implemented for the recording of Jah Won't Pay the Bills, the band recorded 40oz. to Freedom in secrecy at the studios in California State University, Dominguez Hills. Nowell recalled "You weren't supposed to be in there after 9 p.m., but we'd go in at 9:30 and stay until 5 in the morning. We'd just hide from the security guards. They never knew we were there. We managed to get $30,000 worth of studio time for free."

== Influences ==
Sublime themselves credit a number of local reggae and rap bands from California for inspiration in their Thanx Dub. In addition to explicit mentions of artists like KRS-One and Half Pint, Nowell makes copious allusions to others through his lyrics. The line "Stolen from an Africa land" in "Don't Push", for example, alludes to Bob Marley's "Buffalo Soldier". References are also made to Boomtown Rats, Eazy-E, Beastie Boys, Tenor Saw, Pink Floyd, The Specials, The Ziggens, Minutemen, Jimi Hendrix, Just-Ice, Fishbone, Public Enemy, and Flavor Flav, among others.

The album has six covers:

- "Smoke Two Joints" (by The Toyes)
- "We're Only Gonna Die" (by Bad Religion)
- "54-46 That's My Number" (by Toots & the Maytals)
- "Scarlet Begonias" (by Grateful Dead)
- "Rivers of Babylon" (by The Melodians)
- "Hope" (by Descendents)

The song "Don't Push" contains lyrics from the Beastie Boys song "Looking Down the Barrel of a Gun". The song "D.J.s" contains a lyric from Bob Marley's "Ride Natty Ride" with "Dred gotta a job to do". The song "D.J.s" closes with lyrics from the Dandy Livingstone song "Rudy, A Message to You" which was popularized by The Specials, another band often credited as a Sublime influence. In "New Thrash," the words "There ain't no life nowhere" can be heard in the background, a reference to the Jimi Hendrix Experience song "I Don't Live Today" where the same words can be heard. "New Song" starts similarly to the 1990 song 'The Nigga Ya Love To Hate' by Ice Cube, with the line "I heard that payback's a motherfuckin bitch".

== Release history ==
The album was originally released by Skunk Records on compact disc and cassette. The original cassette version contained a longer version of the track "Thanx"; the cassette version was 5:56, while the length was 4:23 on all other releases of the album. A longer instrumental version of the recording appears on the compilation Second-hand Smoke as "Thanx Dub", with a length of 6:28.

The album was reissued by Gasoline Alley Records and MCA with a different track listing, removing the song "Get Out!" and the hidden track "Rawhide" due to copyright issues — "Get Out!" contained unlicensed samples, and "Rawhide", which appeared at the end of "Date Rape", was an uncredited cover of the theme to the TV series of the same name. However, in the album booklet, the lyrics for "Get Out!" are still printed. Additionally, other unlicensed samples were removed from the songs "We're Only Gonna Die for Our Arrogance" and "Let's Go Get Stoned".

The reedited version was released as a picture disc limited edition vinyl album in 2002, following the sixth anniversary of the events of 1996. A limited edition vinyl was released through Hot Topic in 2010.

== Reception and legacy ==
Professional ratings
Review scores
Source	Rating
AllMusic	3/5 stars
Pitchfork	5.6/10
The Rolling Stone Album Guide	2/5 stars

Pitchfork gave the album a mixed review, acknowledging its influence while also critiquing the band for attempting to include too many contradictory styles and influences at once, creating an incoherent sound, saying, "The debut album from the SoCal trio is a flawed artifact of 1990s alt-rock, punk, ska, and hip-hop, but remains a fascinating document of Bradley Nowell as the honey-voiced musical tourist bro."

The author of the article also called the album "prescient" in foreshadowing the role hip-hop would have on late 1990s rock, adding that much of the influence of the album was the lifestyle captured in the lyrics, adding, "the album resonated because it captured a lifestyle. Rejecting the smoldering angst of the grunge music that was beginning to take root on the radio, Sublime made revelry their primary muse, detailing parties, hookups, and bad decisions with such rowdy immediacy." The article also remarks that "time hasn't flattered" the album due to the lyrical content concerning consent and treatment of women.

Remembering the album on the 25th anniversary of its release, LA Weekly wrote, "If 40oz. to Freedom revels in its careening, narcotic whimsy, that's partially why it's stood the test of time. At its core, music is utilitarian, and Sublime reached a universality of experience that can't become obsolete."

=== Commercial performance ===
Since its release in 1992, the album has proved to be a seller over time, moving over two million copies in the US alone and being certified Multi Platinum by the RIAA.

== Track listing ==
All tracks produced by Sublime and Elephant Levitation, except where noted. The songwriting attribution in the liner notes states "all song by Sublime" with the exception of the cover songs. Various sources, including Spotify and Tidal, credit blues guitarist B. B. King for the song What Happened; it appears that this is the result of confusion with his unrelated 1969 song of the same title. Track listing adapted from Tidal.

Skunk Records cassette version
No.	Title	Writer(s)	Producer(s)	Length
1.	"Waiting for My Ruca"	Bradley Nowell; Eric Wilson; Floyd Gaugh	Sublime	2:20
2.	"Get Out!"			3:32
3.	"40oz. to Freedom"	Nowell; Marshall Goodman	Sublime	3:02
4.	"Smoke Two Joints"	Chris Kay; Michael Kay	Miguel	2:53
5.	"We're Only Gonna Die for Our Arrogance"	Greg Graffin		3:21
6.	"Don't Push"	Nowell; Goodman		4:18
7.	"5446 That's My Number/Ball and Chain"	Frederick Hibbert		5:17
8.	"Badfish"	Nowell	Miguel	3:05
9.	"Let's Go Get Stoned"	Nowell; Wilson; Gaugh		3:40
10.	"New Thrash"	Nowell; Goodman		1:30
11.	"Scarlet Begonias"	Jerry Garcia; Robert Hunter	Miguel	3:31
12.	"Live at E's"	Nowell; Wilson; Gaugh		3:08
13.	"D.J.s"	Nowell		3:18
14.	"Chica Me Tipo"	Nowell; Wilson; Gaugh		2:16
15.	"Right Back"	Nowell; Goodman		2:49
16.	"What Happened"	Sublime		3:27
17.	"New Song"	Nowell; Wilson; Gaugh		3:14
18.	"Ebin"	Nowell; Goodman		3:32
19.	"Date Rape / Rawhide"	Nowell; Goodman; Dimitri Tiomkin		4:38
20.	"Hope"	Milo Aukerman		1:43
21.	"KRS-One"	Lawrence Parker; Nowell		2:23
22.	"Rivers of Babylon"	Frank Farian; Brent Dowe; George Reyam; Nowell; James McNaughton		2:29
23.	"Thanx"	Parker; Nowell		5:56
Total length:				75:22

Skunk Records compact disc
No.	Title	Length
23.	"Thanx"	4:23
Total length:		73:48

MCA Records version
No.	Title	Writer(s)	Producer(s)	Length
1.	"Waiting for My Ruca"	Bradley Nowell; Eric Wilson; Floyd Gaugh	Sublime	2:20
2.	"40oz. to Freedom"	Nowell; Marshall Goodman	Sublime	3:02
3.	"Smoke Two Joints"	Chris Kay; Michael Kay	Miguel	2:53
4.	"We're Only Gonna Die for Our Arrogance"	Greg Graffin		3:07
5.	"Don't Push"	Nowell; Goodman		4:18
6.	"5446 That's My Number/Ball and Chain"	Frederick Hibbert		5:17
7.	"Badfish"	Nowell	Miguel	3:04
8.	"Let's Go Get Stoned"	Nowell; Wilson; Gaugh		3:32
9.	"New Thrash"	Nowell; Goodman		1:30
10.	"Scarlet Begonias"	Jerry Garcia; Robert Hunter	Miguel	3:31
11.	"Live at E's"	Nowell; Wilson; Gaugh		3:08
12.	"D.J.s"	Nowell		3:18
13.	"Chica Me Tipo"	Nowell; Wilson; Gaugh		2:16
14.	"Right Back"	Nowell; Goodman		2:49
15.	"What Happened"	Sublime		3:27
16.	"New Song"	Nowell; Wilson; Gaugh		3:14
17.	"Ebin"	Nowell; Goodman		3:32
18.	"Date Rape"	Nowell; Goodman		3:38
19.	"Hope"	Milo Aukerman		1:43
20.	"KRS-One"	Lawrence Parker; Nowell		2:23
21.	"Rivers of Babylon"	Frank Farian; Brent Dowe; George Reyam; Nowell; James McNaughton		2:29
22.	"Thanx"	Parker; Nowell		4:23
Total length:				69:15

== Personnel ==
Sublime

- Bradley Nowell – vocals, guitar, and percussion
- Eric Wilson – bass, vocals ("Live at E's"), and xylophone ("Rivers of Babylon")
- Bud Gaugh – drums and percussion ("Badfish", "Let's Go Get Stoned", "D.J.s", and "New Song")

Other

- Marshall “Ras MG” Goodman – drums (all tracks except "Badfish", "Let's Go Get Stoned", "D.J.s", and "New Song"), turntables, samples, and vocals ("Live at E's")
- Brian Wallace – baritone saxophone
- Chris Hauser – trumpet
- Michael "Miguel" Happoldt – vocals for "Thanx", producer, mixer, unofficial member

== Production ==
- Producers: Michael "Miguel" Happoldt, Sublime, Elephant Levitation
- Engineers: Anthony Antoine Arvizu, Steve McNeil
- Mastering: Brian Gardner
- Artwork: Opie Ortiz
- Photos: Josh Coffman

== Chart positions ==
=== Album ===
Year	Album	Chart	Position
1995	40oz. to Freedom	Heatseekers	No. 1

=== Year-end charts ===
Chart (2002)	Position
Canadian Alternative Albums (Nielsen SoundScan)	133

== Certifications ==
Region	Certification	Certified units/sales
United States (RIAA)	2× Platinum	2,000,000^{^}
^{^} Shipments figures based on certification alone.
