= Panic (Sublime with Rome song) =

Single by Sublime with Rome

from the album Yours Truly
- Released: May 10, 2011
- Recorded: February–April 2011
- Studio: Sonic Ranch in El Paso, Texas
- Genre: Ska punk
- Length: 2:23
- Label: Fueled By Ramen
- Songwriters: Roman Ramirez, Eric Wilson & Bud Gaugh

Sublime with Rome singles chronology
"Panic" (2011)	"Lover's Rock" (2011)

"Panic" is the debut single from Sublime with Rome's debut studio album, Yours Truly. It was first premiered by the Los Angeles radio station KROQ on May 6, 2011.

== Charts ==
=== Weekly charts ===
Chart (2011)	Peak position
Canada Rock (Billboard)	24
US Hot Rock & Alternative Songs (Billboard)	10

=== Year-end charts ===
Chart (2011)	Position
US Hot Rock & Alternative Songs (Billboard)	36
