= The Ziggens =

American rock band

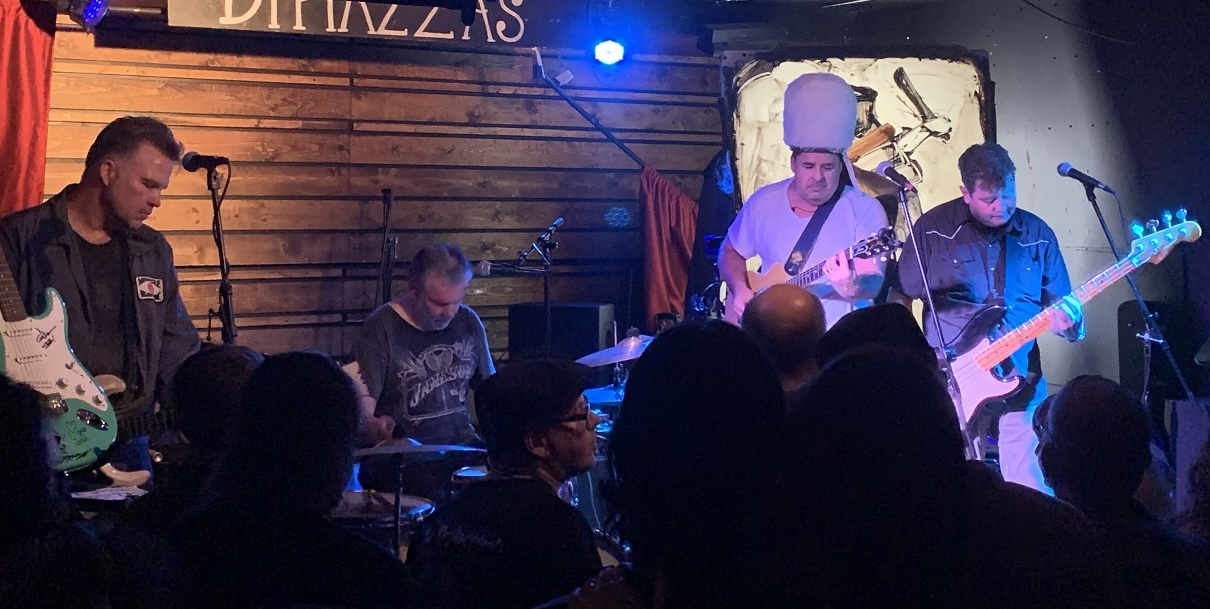
- The Ziggens at their very last show (2020).

Background information
- Origin: Huntington Beach, California, U.S.
- Genres: Surf rock, punk, rockabilly, cowpunk
- Years active: 1990–present
- Labels: Skunk Records; Cornerstone R.A.S.
- Spinoffs: Volcano
- Members: Brad Conyers; Dickie Little
- Past members: Bert Susanka (deceased); Jon Poutney (deceased)

The Ziggens are an American band based out of Huntington Beach, California, United States, whose self-described style of "cowpunksurfabilly" combines elements of cowpunk, surf, rockabilly, punk, ska, and country. The Ziggens were led by Bert Susanka who sang and played rhythm guitar. Other members include Dickie Little on lead guitar, Jon Poutney on bass, and Brad Conyers who plays the drums and provides background vocals. The Ziggens have been playing since the early 1990s and have developed a strong following in Southern California.

The Ziggens were contemporaries with Sublime and were originally signed to their label Skunk Records. Their song "Big Salty Tears" was covered and popularized by Bradley Nowell on the Sublime acoustic album. The Ziggens, and more specifically Susanka, were also mentioned in the Sublime song "Greatest Hits". Also, their song "Outside" is sampled in the Sublime song "Smoke Two Joints" for the line "Smoked cigarettes 'til the day she died!". The Ziggens contributed a cover of the song "Paddle Out" to the Sublime tribute album Look at All the Love We Found, released in June 2005. The Ziggens' bassist Jon Poutney formed the supergroup Volcano with Meat Puppets frontman Curt Kirkwood, Sublime drummer Bud Gaugh, and Sublime soundman Michael "Miguel" Happoldt after the breakup of Eyes Adrift. They released one self-titled studio album in 2004. More recently, Bud Gaugh formed the band Jelly of the Month Club, a children's music side project, with Susanka. The Ziggens are currently signed to Cornerstone R.A.S., which is a subsidiary of Skunk Records. Their seventh studio album, Oregon, was released on September 24, 2021.

Susanka died of ALS on August 17, 2024, at the age of 62. Jon Poutney died on December 10, 2025.

== Discography ==
- C0002 (1990)
- Wake Up & Smell (1991)
- Rusty Never Sleeps (1992)
- Chicken Out! (1995)
- Pit Stop (1995)
- Ignore Amos (1996)
- Pomona Lisa (1998)
- Three Wise Men... and Dickie (1998)
- Live: Tickets Still Available (2000)
- Sleazy Rider (2000)
- The Ziggens (2002)
- Greatest Zits: 1990-2003 (2003)
- Oregon (2021)
- Well qualified to represent the L.B. sea, vol. 1 (2025)
- Well qualified to represent the L.B. sea, vol. 2 (2025)
