= Blessings (Sublime with Rome album) =

Studio album by Sublime with Rome
- Released: May 31, 2019
- Recorded: 2018–2019
- Studio: Sonic Ranch in El Paso, Texas
- Genre: Ska; reggae; alternative rock
- Length: 33:53
- Label: 5 Music
- Producer: Rob Cavallo

Sublime with Rome chronology
Sirens (2015)	Blessings (2019)	Sublime with Rome (2024)

Singles from Blessings
- 1. "Wicked Heart" Released: July 27, 2018; 2. "Spiderweb" Released: January 25, 2019; 3. "Blackout" Released: March 22, 2019; 4. "Light On" Released: April 26, 2019

Blessings is the third studio album by American rock band Sublime with Rome, released on May 31, 2019 through 5 Music. It is the only album to include former Tribal Seeds drummer Carlos Verdugo following Josh Freese's departure in 2017. The album was recorded at Sonic Ranch in El Paso, Texas and was produced by Rob Cavallo.

"Wicked Heart" was released as the album's first single, reaching No. 34 on Billboard's Alternative Songs chart.

== Track listing ==
Credits adapted from iTunes.

No.	Title	Length
1.	"Blessings"	3:30
2.	"Light On"	3:25
3.	"Wild Fire"	2:28
4.	"Spiderweb"	3:05
5.	"Blackout"	3:42
6.	"Wicked Heart"	3:18
7.	"Survive"	3:11
8.	"May Day"	3:27
9.	"One Day At A Time" (featuring Eddie Zuko)	2:23
10.	"Thank U"	2:16
11.	"For The Night"	3:30

== Personnel ==
- Rome Ramirez – vocals, guitar
- Eric Wilson – bass
- Carlos Verdugo – drums, percussion
- Gabrial McNair – trombone, keyboards
- Eddie Zuko – guest vocals on "One Day At A Time"
- Rob Cavallo – production
- Leigh "LDontheCut" Snyder – production on "Survive"
