= Midwestern Hurricane =

Studio album by Maggie Walters
- Released: March 11, 2008
- Genre: Indie rock, indie folk, Americana
- Producer: Paul Leary; Maggie Walters

Maggie Walters chronology
Maggie Walters (2005)	Midwestern Hurricane (2008)

Midwestern Hurricane is the second full-length album by the American musician Maggie Walters, released on March 11, 2008.

It was produced by the Butthole Surfers' Paul Leary and mixed by James Vollentine. The album includes appearances by Ian McLagan, Ray Wylie Hubbard, and the cellist John Hagen (Lyle Lovett).

Due to the terms of the contract under which this album was recorded, four of the songs ("Fingerprints", "Ann Marie", "Sundays" and "Be Careful Love") are remixed or reworked versions of songs from Maggie Walters, Walters' first album. Walters later parted with the label with which Midwestern Hurricane was recorded while managing to retain the rights to the album, partially because these four songs were originally released on her first album.

== Track listing ==
1. Under the Table - 3:00
2. Girls Like Us - 3:23
3. Fingerprints - 5:07
4. Ann Marie - 4:00
5. Captain - 3:21
6. Sundays - 3:36
7. Water Signs - 4:01
8. Be Careful Love - 3:47
9. Midwestern Hurricane - 5:17
10. You Got Something - 2:13
