= Secret Hate =

American punk rock band

- Origin: Long Beach, California
- Genre: Punk
- Years active: 1981-1983, 1998-2000
- Labels: New Alliance Records; Cornerstone R.A.S.
- Members: Mike Davis; Kevin Roach; Rick "June Bug" Selga "Secret Black Davilla"; Bob Schaeffer
- Past members: Reggie Rector; Kim Renee

Secret Hate was a punk rock band based in Long Beach, California, which initially contributed two tracks to the Hell Comes to Your House compilation in 1981, as well as an EP, Vegetables Dancing on the now-defunct New Alliance Records. "The Ballad of Johnny Butt", the fourth track on Vegetables Dancing, was covered by Sublime for their eponymous major label debut in 1996. Secret Hate broke up shortly afterward, but reformed in the late 1990s in order to release a full-length LP entitled Pop Cult Vomit, which was released on Cornerstone R.A.S., a subsidiary of Skunk Records.

== Discography ==
=== EP ===
- Vegetables Dancing (1983)

=== Album ===
- Pop Cult Vomit (2000)

=== Compilation album ===
- Hell Comes to Your House (1981)
