= Volcano (supergroup) =

American supergroup band (2003–2004)

- Origin: United States
- Years active: 2003–2004
- Label: Skunk
- Past members: Curt Kirkwood; Bud Gaugh; Jon Poutney (deceased); Michael 'Miguel' Happoldt (as "Mike Stand")

Volcano was a supergroup formed by Meat Puppets frontman Curt Kirkwood, Sublime drummer Bud Gaugh, Sublime soundman Michael 'Miguel' Happoldt, and bass player of The Ziggens Jon Poutney after the breakup of Eyes Adrift. They released one self-titled studio album in 2004.

In an interview with Rolling Stone, Kirkwood said: "The producer says it sounds a lot like Eighties, SST-era, Up On the Sun Meat Puppets. But there's more bouncy rhythms -- we do a lot more stuff that was inspired by The Selecter, The Specials, and Bob Marley."

Kirkwood wanted to name the band "Pine Cone", but was outvoted by other group members.

The bands' sole LP was remastered by Bob Weston and reissued on digital streaming platforms on April 17, 2025, with a physical 12" release scheduled for June 2025 via Don Giovanni Records, limited to 1000 copies.
