= Long Beach Dub Allstars =

American dub, ska, and reggae rock band

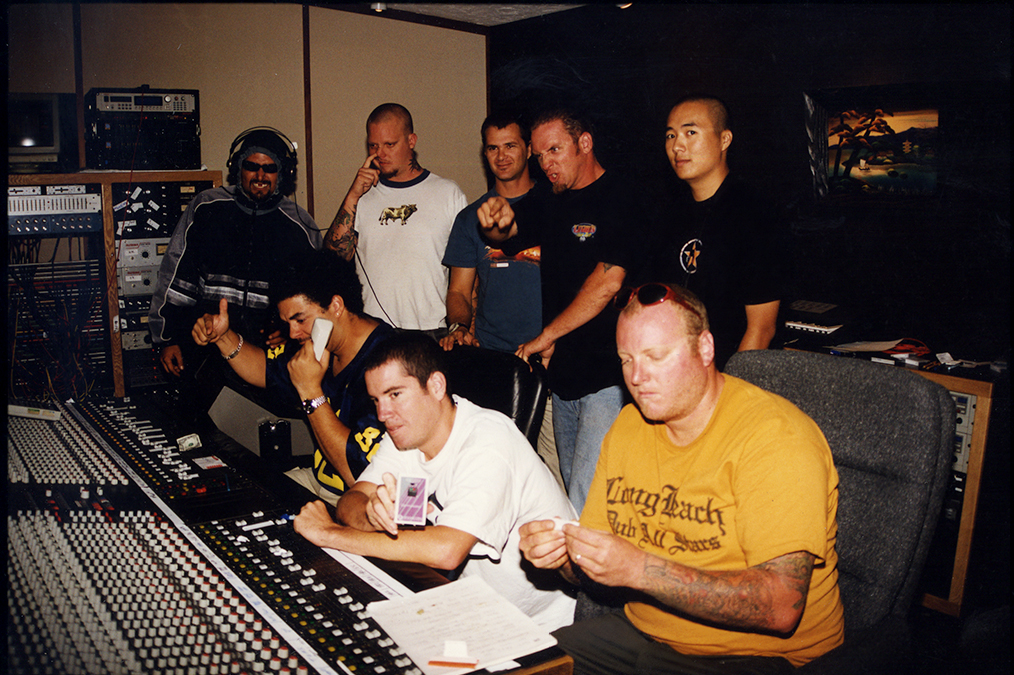
- Long Beach Dub Allstars at the Total Access Studios in 2014

Background information
- Origin: Long Beach, California, U.S.
- Genres: Reggae; ska; dub; punk rock
- Years active: 1997–2002; 2012–present
- Labels: Regime Music Group; Suburban Noize; DreamWorks; Skunk
- Members: Opie Ortiz; Tim Wu; Michael Happoldt; Roger Rivas; Edwin Kampwirth; Ian Foreman
- Past members: Eric Wilson; Bud Gaugh; Isaiah Ikey Owens; Todd Forman; RAS-1; Jack Maness; Marshall Goodman; Devin Morrison
- Website: www.lbdamusic.com

The Long Beach Dub Allstars is an American band formed in 1997 and disbanded in 2002, but reformed 10 years later.

== History ==
=== Initial career (1997–2001) ===
Eric Wilson and Bud Gaugh met in childhood (in 1979) and later started their first garage punk band, consisting of drums, bass and vocals. In 1988, with Bradley Nowell, they formed the ska punk and reggae rock band Sublime, which went on to sell over 17 million albums worldwide. After Nowell's fatal heroin overdose in 1996, Wilson and Gaugh founded the Long Beach Dub Allstars (LBDAS) with RAS-1 from Long Beach reggae band Jah Children on guitar & vocals, who were then joined by frequent Sublime contributors Michael "Miguel" Happoldt, Todd Forman, and "Field" Marshall Goodman.

Eric Wilson said: "We will never replace the greatness that Sublime did or what Bradley has done." The LBDAS were originally a 10-piece and they recorded their debut recording called Right Back, which shortly after completion in 1999 saw the departure of three members. Their second album, Wonders of the World was recorded and released in 2001. It featured "Sunny Hours" featuring will.i.am from The Black Eyed Peas. "Sunny Hours" was also used as the theme song for the Friends spin-off Joey.

=== Breakup and aftermath (2002–2012) ===
In 2002, rumors that the band had broken up began to surface. Apparently the band had taken a hard-drug-free vow and some of the band's members had broken this vow, which caused Bud Gaugh to quit and join Eyes Adrift with Krist Novoselic of Nirvana and Curt Kirkwood of Meat Puppets. Gaugh subsequently played with Kirkwood and Michael Happoldt in the band Volcano. Eric Wilson, Trey Pangborn and RAS-1 formed Long Beach Shortbus with former Slightly Stoopid and temporary Sublime drummer, Kelly Vargas (later replaced by Damion Ramirez). Marshall Goodman, Jack Maness and Opie Ortiz formed Dubcat, with members of Hepcat. Shortbus has had slightly more success than Dubcat, though the latter has yet to release an album. Eric Wilson and Bud Gaugh later reunited in Sublime with Rome, a new incarnation of Sublime which chiefly performs songs by that band and features Rome Ramirez in place of Bradley Nowell. However, Gaugh left shortly after their first tour to focus on family and played a few shows with the band Badfish.

=== Reunion (2012–present) ===
On September 1, 2012, Long Beach Dub Allstars played their first show in 11 years at the Queen Mary Events Park next to the Queen Mary in Long Beach, California, where they opened for The Wailers and played alongside Tribal Seeds. Then on September 30, 2012, Long Beach Dub Allstars performed at the Yost Theater in Santa Ana, California, where they opened for Fishbone. They played another show at the Brixton Southbay in Redondo Beach, California on January 25, 2013, with the local Redondo Beach Band Special "C". The reunion lineup consists of Marshall Goodman "Ras MG" on drums, Michael "Miguel" Happoldt on lead guitar/vocals, Opie Ortiz on vocals, Jack Maness on vocals/guitar/keys, Tim Wu on sax/flute/vocals, and Edwin Kampwith on bass.

In 2017, the group toured across California and played one-off shows in Nevada and Florida. They were set to play two shows in San Francisco and Sacramento early in 2018, as well as a gig at Red Rocks Amphitheatre on April 19.

In 2019, the group toured extensively across the US and parts of Canada with the Aggrolites. Later that year, the group toured Japan.

On May 29, 2020, the Long Beach Dub Allstars released their eponymous third studio album under Suburban Noize Records. The self-titled album features 10 tracks with their first single, "Tell Me" along with a music video.

On June 30, 2023, the Long Beach Dub Allstars released their fourth studio album, Echo Mountain High on Regime Music Group. It features 13 tracks with their first single, "Somewhere" that was released on social media and YouTube on April 21. Other singles released with music videos are "Precious Time" and "Preacha", featuring Long Beach local musician Philileano.

== Lineup ==
=== Current members ===
- Opie Ortiz (lead vocals)
- Michael "Miguel" Happoldt (guitar)
- Tim Wu (alto saxophone, baritone saxophone, flute, vocals)
- Roger Rivas (keyboard, organ)
- Ed Kampwirth (bass)
- Ian Foreman (drums)

=== Touring members ===
Drums:

- Gil Sharone

Guitar:

- Devin Morrison (Expanders/ Man Like Devin)
- Bobby Easton (Trulio Disgracious)
- David Yun (Eureka Sound)
- Chris Brennen (Aggrolites)

Keyboards:

- Roy Fishell (Expanders)
- Ryan Kordich (Eureka Sound)

Horns:

- Brian Wallace “Dub Robot”

=== Former members ===
- RAS-1 (lead vocals, guitar)
- Eric Wilson (bass)
- Bud Gaugh (drums)
- Marshall Goodman "Ras MG" (drums, percussion, turntables)
- Jack Maness (keyboard, vocals)
- Todd Forman (alto saxophone, percussion)
- Isaiah Ikey Owens (keyboard
- Devin Morrison (guitar)
- Brad Croes (saxophone)
- Gil Sharone (drums)

Note: The group started out as a 10-piece, but Forman and Owens left while recording for the album Right Back. It is unclear whether or not they appear on the album. Miguel left shortly after it was recorded; he is shown on the album and is credited, but is not cited as a member.

== Discography ==
=== Albums ===
- Right Back (1999) No. 67 Billboard 200
- Wonders of the World (2001) No. 59 Billboard 200
- Long Beach Dub Allstars (2020)
- Echo Mountain High (2023)

=== Singles ===
- "Trailer Ras" / "Kick Down" (1999)
- "Sunny Hours" (2001) No. 28 Billboard Hot Modern Rock Tracks
- "Holding On" / "Steady Customer" (2017)
- "Somewhere" (2023)

=== Compilation appearances ===
- Free the West Memphis 3 – "The Harder They Come" with Joe Strummer and Tippa Irie.
