= Long Beach Shortbus =

American reggae band (2002–2007)

- Also known as: Shortbus
- Origin: Long Beach, California, United States
- Genres: Reggae; punk rock; pop rock; acoustic
- Years active: 2002–2007
- Labels: Skunk; Long Beach
- Spinoff of: Long Beach Dub Allstars
- Past members: Eric Wilson; RAS-1; Trey Pangborn; Damion Ramirez; Kelly Vargas

Long Beach Shortbus was an American reggae-influenced punk band from Long Beach, California. The band consisted of four regular members: RAS-1 (lead vocals and guitar), Trey Pangborn (guitar), Eric Wilson (bass guitar), and Damion Ramirez (drums). Long Beach Shortbus originated as a side project of RAS-1 and Eric Wilson, eventually taking shape after the Long Beach Dub Allstars disbanded in 2002.

Their first CD was a self-titled extended play (EP) and featured their hit "California Grace." Their second CD was entitled Flying Ship of Fantasy, featuring tracks from their first album. "California Grace" is also available on the soundtrack to the MTV reality series Laguna Beach. On October 7, 2007, it was announced that the band would be parting ways. Their final show took place at the Haunted Ball and Chain festival in San Diego, California, on November 2 and 3. Eric Wilson was later in Sublime with Rome, an incarnation of Sublime which chiefly performed songs by that band, and also featured Rome Ramirez filling in for their late singer/guitarist Bradley Nowell.

== Discography ==
=== Studio albums ===
- Long Beach Shortbus (2002)
- Flying Ship of Fantasy (2004)

=== Compilation albums ===
- Kingrock Entertainment Listen Up Volume No. 1 (2008)

== See also ==
- Sublime
- Long Beach Dub Allstars
