= Jack Maness =

American singer-songwriter

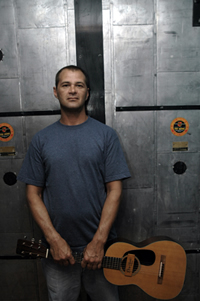

Background information
- Origin: Long Beach, California, United States
- Genres: Acoustic; Reggae
- Occupation: Singer-songwriter
- Instruments: Guitar, keyboard
- Years active: 1992–present
- Label: Skunk Records

Jack Maness is an American singer-songwriter, guitarist, and keyboardist.

Maness began his career singing and playing guitar on Sublime's "Rivers of Babylon", and later joining the Long Beach Dub Allstars as a keyboardist. He was a founding member of Dubcat and has recently released his debut solo album Simple Man featuring members of Dubcat, Slightly Stoopid, and motown bass legend Carol Kaye. Jack's work has been licensed to Lexus auto, Procter and Gamble Bounce fabric softener, and various other media. He has also collaborated with reggae legend Half Pint on a track entitled "Unity" on a release titled No Stress Express. Jack was invited to Jamaica to play at the 2007 Reggae Sumfest. Jack continues to work as a writer and collaborator on musical projects with various groups.

In 2018 Jack was working with lifelong bandmates from Long Beach Dub Allstars.
