= Eyes Adrift =

American band (2002–2003)

- Origin: United States
- Genres: Cowpunk, alternative rock, alternative country
- Years active: 2002–2003
- Label: SpinART
- Past members: Krist Novoselic; Curt Kirkwood; Bud Gaugh

Eyes Adrift (known in Australia as Bud, Curt & Krist) was a three-piece rock supergroup consisting of Krist Novoselic (bass guitar, formerly of Nirvana), Curt Kirkwood (guitar and lead vocals, of Meat Puppets), and Bud Gaugh (drums, formerly of Sublime and Long Beach Dub Allstars). They released a self-titled album in 2002, which was a mixture of punk, grunge, and country, taking all of their previous backgrounds and putting them together. They toured the United States in 2002. They later broke up in 2003, after their debut album performed below expectations. Kirkwood and Gaugh went on to form the supergroup band known as Volcano. The album is currently out of print. Novoselic went on to become a political activist in Seattle, Washington, before forming Giants in the Trees.

In Australia, there was another group called "Eyes Adrift", and rather than pay to license that name, the trio called the band and album "Bud, Curt & Krist".

== Band members ==
- Krist Novoselic – bass guitar, lead vocals
- Curt Kirkwood – guitar, lead vocals
- Bud Gaugh – drums, percussion, synthesizer

== Discography ==
=== Self-titled album ===
Eyes Adrift

Studio album by Eyes Adrift
- Released: September 24, 2002
- Recorded: 2001/2002
- Genre: Rock
- Length: 58:52
- Label: SpinART

Singles from Eyes Adrift
- 1. "Alaska" Released: March 3, 2002

Alternative cover
- On the cover of the Australian version of the album, the band members' faces were reordered to accord with the title.

Professional ratings
Review scores
Source	Rating
AllMusic	2/5 stars
Trouser Press	(favorable)

Eyes Adrift (Bud, Curt & Krist in Australia), the band's only album, was released on September 24, 2002. "Alaska" was the album's only single, released on March 3, 2003 in the UK.

== Track listing ==
1. "Sleight of Hand" – 4:11
2. "Alaska" – 2:51
3. "Inquiring Minds" – 2:46
4. "Untried" – 3:56
5. "Blind Me" – 4:01
6. "Dottie Dawn & Julie Jewel" – 3:04
7. "Solid" – 3:37
8. "Pyramids" – 5:13
9. "Telescope" – 4:06
10. "Slow Race" – 5:00
11. "What I Said" – 4:34
12. "Pasted" – 15:33

"Inquiring Minds" is dedicated to JonBenét Ramsey.

The Japanese edition of the album, released on January 29, 2003 includes two additional tracks; "Son of Pasted" (also known as "The Jerk") and "The Cup & The Lip".

=== "Alaska" single ===
The CD single to "Alaska", released on December 2, 2003 includes the tracks: "The Jerk" and "The Cup & the Lip".

== Personnel ==
- Krist Novoselic – bass guitar, lead vocals on "Inquiring Minds", "Dottie Dawn & Julie Jewel" and "Pasted"
- Curt Kirkwood – guitar, lead vocals on "Sleight Of Hand", "Alaska", "Untried", "Blind Me", "Solid", "Pyramids", "Telescope", "Slow Race" and "What I Said"
- Bud Gaugh – drums, percussion, synthesizer
- Jimmy Shortell – trumpet on "Sleight of Hand"
- John Plymale - Mix Engineer
