= Michael Happoldt =

American musician

Michael "Miguel" Happoldt (born July 5, 1969, in Atlanta, Georgia) is an American musician, producer, songwriter, mixing engineer, and label executive.

== Career ==
While studying at California State University, Dominguez Hills, Happoldt met alternative rock group the Ziggens. He began recording and producing with the group and eventually joined to record their first album, C0002. Inspired by the punk rock and DIY movements of SST, BYO and Dischord Records tracks, in 1989 Happoldt created the logo and label Skunk Records and released the Ziggens' album on cassette.

In 1990, Happoldt moved to Long Beach, California, where he met Sublime's Bradley Nowell at a party. Happoldt invited Sublime to make some live-to-DAT recordings. Intrigued by the Ziggens' cassette release, Nowell played a four-song demo for Happoldt, which Nowell had recorded before meeting Happoldt, and asked him to put it out on Skunk Records.

Happoldt has been involved in some capacity with the Long Beach Dub Allstars, the supergroup Volcano, Lucky Boys Confusion, Unwritten Law, Slightly Stoopid, and Long Beach Shortbus.

Since 2010, Happoldt formed and has led the band Perro Bravo, and they have released three albums to date.

== Personal life ==
Happoldt was raised between Virginia Beach, Virginia, and Lakeland, Florida. Upon graduating high school in 1987, he moved to Carson, California, to attend California State University, Dominguez Hills, where he studied audio recording and music production.

Following Bradley Nowell's death in 1996, Happoldt cared for Nowell's dalmatian dog and Sublime mascot Lou Dog. Lou Dog died on September 17, 2001.
