= Skunk Records =

California-based record label

- Founded: 1990
- Founder: Michael "Miguel" Happoldt; Bradley Nowell
- Distributor: Suburban Noize
- Genre: Third wave ska; reggae; dub
- Country of origin: United States
- Location: Long Beach, California

Skunk Records is a Long Beach, California based record label that was founded by Michael "Miguel" Happoldt and Bradley Nowell (Sublime) in 1990. Skunk is affiliated with the spinoff label Cornerstone R.A.S.

The inspiration for forming a record label came to Happoldt in 1989 as a way to release music for his band the Ziggens. Happoldt met Nowell shortly thereafter, who insisted on having Sublime backed by the nascent label. Happoldt was selective in choosing other acts, which later included Slightly Stoopid, Juice Bros, Philieano, Toko Tasi, and Paulie Nugent. After the death of Nowell, Happoldt took on the label independently. By the early 2000s, the label was in decline. Happoldt continues to make records for the label.

Happoldt has encouraged bands on Skunk to move to larger labels as they increase their audience, as he prefers to focus on music creation instead of marketing.

In 2009, Skunk Records and Suburban Noize Records entered into a distribution partnership. In 2014, the label celebrated its 25th anniversary with a four show tour.

== Artists ==
- Sublime
- Burn Unit
- Corn Doggy Dog and the 1/2 Pound
- Das Klown
- Del Noah & the Mt. Ararat Finks
- Falling Idols
- Filibuster
- Frank Jordan
- Juice Bros.
- LAW
- Long Beach Allday
- Long Beach Dub Allstars
- Long Beach Shortbus
- Jack Maness
- Mishka
- Monsieur Leroc
- Mystic Roots Band
- Pepper
- Perro Bravo
- Philieano
- Secret Hate
- Slightly Stoopid
- Toko Tasi
- Volcano
- The Ziggens

== See also ==
- List of record labels
