= Unwritten Law discography =

- Studio albums: 7
- Extended plays: 2
- Live albums: 4
- Compilation albums: 3
- Singles: 11
- Video albums: 2
- Music videos: 15
- Demo albums: 1
- Other appearances: 5
- Official bootlegs: 1

American rock band Unwritten Law has released seven studio albums, two live albums, two EPs, two video albums, eleven singles, one demo, and thirteen music videos.

Unwritten Law formed in 1990 in Poway, California with an initial lineup of singer Scott Russo, guitarists Steve Morris and Rob Brewer, bassist John Bell, and drummer Wade Youman. They released their six-song demo in 1992 and the EP Blurr in 1993. Their debut album Blue Room was released in 1994 through local label Red Eye Records. The band then signed to Epic Records, who re-released Blue Room and put out 1996's Oz Factor, supported by singles for "Lame", "Denied", and "Superman", the latter of which became the band's first music video. Bell then left the group and the band signed to Interscope Records, bringing in Pivit bassist Micah Albao for the recording of 1998's Unwritten Law. By the time of the album's release Pat "PK" Kim had become their permanent bassist. Unwritten Law was their first album to chart, reaching #16 on Billboard's Heatseekers Albums chart, and spawned five music videos: "Teenage Suicide", "California Sky", "Holiday", "Cailin", and "Lonesome". "Cailin" and "Lonesome" were released as singles, the former being Unwritten Law's first song to chart, reaching #28 on the Alternative Songs chart. In 1999 they released the Visit to Oz EP in Australia, coinciding with their first headlining tour there.

The band's fourth album was 2002's Elva, their first to chart on the Billboard 200, reaching #69. "Up All Night" and "Seein' Red" were both released as singles, the latter becoming the highest-charting song of the band's career by reaching the #1 spot on the Alternative Songs chart. The group then moved to Lava Records and released 2003's Music in High Places, a live acoustic album recorded in Yellowstone National Park for the VH1 series of the same name, which spawned a charting single for "Rest of My Life". Youman was then ejected from the band, so Adrian Young and Tony Palermo played drums on the recording of Here's to the Mourning (2005). Palermo joined the band permanently, and the singles for "Save Me (Wake Up Call)" and "She Says" from the album both reached the Alternative Songs chart, the former being the band's second-highest-charting song at #5. Brewer was fired from Unwritten Law in 2005 and the band continued as a quartet.

In 2006 Interscope released 20th Century Masters: The Millennium Collection, a compilation of tracks from Unwritten Law and Elva. Unwritten Law followed by releasing their own greatest hits album, The Hit List, on Abydos Records in 2007. Consisting mostly of re-recorded versions of songs from their back catalog, it reached #10 on the Independent Albums chart. No singles were released from this album, but a music video was filmed for the new track "Shoulda Known Better". Palermo then left Unwritten Law for Papa Roach and was replaced by Dylan Howard. The band signed to Suburban Noize Records, releasing the live album and DVD Live and Lawless in 2008 and their sixth studio album, Swan, in 2011.

== Albums ==
=== Studio albums ===
Year	Album details	Peak chart positions		
Year	Album details	US	US Ind.	AUS
1994	Blue Room: Released: September 12, 1994; Label: Epic (67363); Format: CD, CS	—	—	—
1996	Oz Factor: Released: April 29, 1996; Label: Epic (67511); Format: CD, CS	—	—	—
1998	Unwritten Law: Released: June 2, 1998; Label: Interscope (90189); Format: CD, CS, DI	—	5	62
2002	Elva: Released: January 29, 2002; Label: Interscope (10571-2); Format: CD, LP	69	—	17
2005	Here's to the Mourning: Released: February 1, 2005; Label: Lava (93147); Format: CD	51	—	27
2011	Swan: Released: March 29, 2011; Label: Suburban Noize; Format: CD	195	—	41
2022	The Hum: Released: July 29, 2022; Label: Cleopatra; Format: CD	—	—	—
"—" denotes an album that did not chart.

=== Live albums ===
Year	Album details	Peak chart positions	
Year	Album details	US	US Ind.
1997	Live in Hollyweird: Released: 1997; Label: Format: CD (limited to 2000 copies)	—	—
2003	Music in High Places: Released: January 21, 2003; Label: Earth Escapes (83632); Format: CD	134	5
2008	Live and Lawless: Released: September 30, 2008; Label: Suburban Noize (427); Format: CD/DVD	—	—
2026	An Evening with Unwritten Law Live in San Diego: Released: July 2026; Label: Cleopatra; Format: CD, vinyl	—	—
"—" denotes an album that did not chart.

=== Compilation albums ===
Year	Album details	Peak chart positions	
Year	Album details	US	US Ind.
2006	20th Century Masters: The Millennium Collection: Released: October 10, 2006; Label: Interscope (06816); Format: CD	—	—
2007	The Hit List: Released: January 2, 2007; Label: Abydos; Format: CD	184	10
2016	Acoustic: Released: April 1, 2016; Label: Cyber Tracks; Format: CD, vinyl, digital download	—	—
"—" denotes an album that did not chart.

=== Demo albums ===
Year	Album details
1992	Six Song Demo: Released: September 1992; Format: CS

== Extended plays ==
Year	EP details
1993	Blurr: Released: 1993; Label: Red Eye; Format: 7"
1999	Visit to Oz: Released: June 1999; Label: Interscope; Format: CD

== Singles ==
Year	Single	Peak chart positions			Album
Year	Single	US Bubbling	US Alternative	AUS	Album
1996	"Lame"	—	—	—	Oz Factor
1996	"Denied"	—	—	—	Oz Factor
1996	"Superman"	—	—	—	Oz Factor
1998	"California Sky"	—	—	—	Unwritten Law
1998	"Holiday"	—	—	—	Unwritten Law
1999	"Cailin"	—	28	—	Unwritten Law
2000	"Lonesome"	—	—	36	Unwritten Law
2001	"Up All Night"	—	14	71	Elva
2002	"Seein' Red"	5	1	73	Elva
2003	"Rest of My Life"	—	16	—	Music in High Places
2005	"Save Me (Wake Up Call)"	8	5	—	Here's to the Mourning
2005	"She Says"	—	32	—	Here's to the Mourning
2007	"Shoulda Known Better"	—	—	—	The Hit List
2011	"Starships and Apocalypse"	—	—	—	Swan
2011	"Sing"	—	—	—	Swan
2012	"Nevermind"	—	—	—	Swan
"—" denotes songs that did not chart.

== Video albums ==
Year	Video details
1999	Live In Australia 99: Released: 1999; Label: N/A; Format: VHS
2003	Live in Yellowstone: Released: 2003; Label: Image (3314); Formats: VHS, DVD
2008	Live and Lawless: Released: September 30, 2008; Label: Suburban Noize (427); Format: CD/DVD

== Music videos ==
Year	Title	Director(s)
1996	"Superman"	
1998	"Teenage Suicide"	Taylor Steele, Emmett Malloy
1998	"California Sky"	Taylor Steele, Emmett Malloy
1998	"Holiday"	Darren Doane, Ken Daurio
1999	"Cailin"	Doug Pray
2000	"Lonesome"	Bill Otto
2002	"Up All Night"	Honey
2002	"Seein' Red"	Marc Webb
2003	"Rest of My Life"	
2005	"Save Me (Wake Up Call)"	Brett Simon
2005	"She Says"	Jessy Terrero
2007	"Shoulda Known Better"	Fernando Apodaca
2011	"Starships and Apocalypse"	Dale Resteghini
2011	"Swan Song"	
2011	"Sing"	Daniel Coolahan
2022	"Ghosted"	Joseph Russo

== Other appearances ==
The following Unwritten Law songs were released on compilation albums, soundtracks, and other releases. This is not an exhaustive list.

Year	Release details	Track(s)
1995	Punk Sucks: Released: 1995; Label: Liberation Records; Format: CD	"C.P.K."
1997	Before You Were Punk: Released: March 11, 1997; Label: Vagrant; Format: CD	"Goody Two-Shoes" (originally performed by Adam Ant; featuring members of Buck-O-Nine)
1999	Short Music for Short People: Released: June 1, 1999; Label: Fat Wreck Chords (FAT 591-2); Format: CD	"Armageddon Singalong"
1999	Burning London: The Clash Tribute: Released: 1999; Label: Epic; Format: CD	"Guns Of Brixton"(originally performed by "The Clash"
1999	Kevin & Bean's Last Christmas: Released: 1999; Label: N/A; Format: CD	"Please Come Home For Christmas"
2000	Hit & Run Soundtrack: Released: 2000; Label: N/A; Format: N/A	"Hit and Run"
2002	Don't Make Me Pull This Thing Over: Released: August 6, 2002; Label: Roadrunner; Format: CD	"Take Me Away (Jodi)"
2002	Santa Clause 2 Soundtrack: Released: November 1, 2002; Label: Disney; Format: CD	"Unwritten Christmas" (featuring Sum 41)
2004	North Shore: Released: 2004; Label: none; Format: unreleased (series theme song)	"Home in Paradise"
2018	Slabratory - Sick Slabs Of Sonic Sound 2: Released: September 18, 2018; Label: None; Format: CD	"I Will Refuse" (originally performed by Pailhead)

== Official bootlegs ==
Year	Album details
1997	Live in Hollyweird: Released: 1997; Label: none; Format: CD
