= The Hit List (Unwritten Law album) =

Greatest hits album by Unwritten Law
- Released: January 2, 2007
- Recorded: 2006 at The Blue Room
- Studio: Glenwood Place Studios in Burbank; Chop Shop in Los Angeles
- Genre: Punk rock; pop-punk; skate punk; melodic hardcore; alternative rock
- Length: 73:14
- Label: Abydos

Unwritten Law chronology
Here's to the Mourning (2005)	The Hit List (2007)	Live and Lawless (2008)

Singles from The Hit List
- 1. "Shoulda Known Better" Released: 2007

Professional ratings
Review scores
Source	Rating
Allmusic	3.5/5 stars

The Hit List is the sixth album by the San Diego–based rock band Unwritten Law, released on January 2, 2007, by Abydos Records. It is a "best of" album that includes 3 songs from their 2005 album Here's to the Mourning, new studio recordings of 14 songs from their earlier albums, and the new songs "Shoulda Known Better" and "Welcome to Oblivion." The earlier songs were all re-recorded by the current lineup of the band, and some differ significantly from the original recordings, reflecting changes in the band's lineup and musical style over the years.

This was the last release by the band to feature drummer Tony Palermo, who left in March 2008 to join Papa Roach.

== Track listing ==
No.	Title	Lyrics	Music	Length
1.	"Shoulda Known Better"	Scott Russo, Mickey Avalon, Cisco Adler	Russo, Morgan Haley	3:23
2.	"Celebration Song" (from Here's to the Mourning)	Russo, Aimee Allen	Russo, Rob Brewer	3:39
3.	"Rescue Me"	Russo	Russo	3:03
4.	"Save Me (Wake Up Call)" (from Here's to the Mourning)	Russo, Allen	Russo, Linda Perry, Allen	3:32
5.	"She Says" (from Here's to the Mourning)	Russo, Allen	Russo, Phil Jamieson	3:59
6.	"Up All Night"	Russo	Russo	3:00
7.	"Welcome to Oblivion"	Russo, A. Jay Popoff	Steve Morris	3:51
8.	"Seein' Red"	Russo	Russo	3:46
9.	"Teenage Suicide"	Russo	Russo, Morris, Brewer, Wade Youman	2:42
10.	"California Sky"	Russo, Youman	Russo, Morris, Brewer, Youman	2:54
11.	"Harmonic"	Russo, Brewer	Russo, Morris, Brewer, Youman	3:42
12.	"Rest of My Life"	Russo	Russo	2:34
13.	"Blame It on Me"	Russo	Brewer, Russo, Youman	2:32
14.	"How You Feel"	Russo	Russo	2:49
15.	"Lonesome"	Russo	Russo, Morris, Brewer, Youman	3:34
16.	"Cailin"	Russo	Russo, Morris, Brewer, Youman	4:02
17.	"Shallow"	Russo, Morris, Brewer, John Bell, Youman	Russo, Morris, Brewer, Bell, Youman	3:00
18.	"Superman"	Russo, Morris, Brewer, Bell, Youman	Russo, Morris, Brewer, Bell, Youman	3:47
19.	"C.P.K."	Russo, Morris, Brewer, Bell, Youman	Russo, Morris, Brewer, Bell, Youman	9:01
20.	"Shoulda Known Better" (Mickey Avalon version; unlisted track)	Russo, Avalon, Adler	Russo, Haley	3:24

== Personnel ==
=== Band ===
- Scott Russo – lead vocals, rhythm guitar
- Steve Morris – lead guitar, backing vocals
- Pat "PK" Kim – bass guitar, backing vocals
- Tony Palermo – drums

=== Additional musicians ===
- Mickey Avalon – backing vocals on "Shoulda Known Better", lead vocals on "Shoulda Known Better" (Mickey Avalon version)
- Rob Brewer – rhythm guitar on tracks 2, 4 & 5
- Adrian Young – drums on "Celebration Song"

=== Production ===
- Sean Bevan – producer, recording engineer (tracks 1, 2, 4, 5, 7, and 20), mix engineer
- Josh Abraham – producer of "Celebration Song" (with Beavan)
- Linda Perry – producer of "Save Me (Wake Up Call)" (with Beavan)
- Critter and Zach Barnhorst – recording engineers (tracks 2, 4, and 5)
- Chris Baseford and Scott Humphrey – recording engineers (tracks 3, 6, and 8–19)
- Greg Collins – additional recording on "Welcome to Oblivion"
- Tom Lord-Alge – mixing of "Shoulda Known Better"
- Brian Gardner – mastering

=== Artwork ===
- Pat Kim and Bonifacio – artwork and design

== Chart positions ==
Year	Chart	Position
2007	Billboard 200	184
2007	Top Independent Albums	5

Chart performance for The Hit List
Chart (2007)	Peak position
US Billboard 200	184
Independent Albums (Billboard)	5
