= Music in High Places =

Live album by Unwritten Law
- Released: January 21, 2003
- Recorded: August 2002 in Yellowstone National Park and at DLI Studios, San Diego
- Genre: Alternative rock
- Length: 36:54
- Label: Earth Escapes
- Producer: Unwritten Law; Anthony Eaton

Unwritten Law chronology
Elva (2002)	Music in High Places (2003)	Here's to the Mourning (2005)

Alternative cover
- Alternative cover used for online pre-order copies of the album.

Professional ratings
Review scores
Source	Rating
Allmusic	2.5/5 stars

Music in High Places is a live album by the San Diego–based rock band Unwritten Law, released in 2003 by Earth Escapes. It was recorded live for the VH1 program Music in High Places and features the band performing acoustic renditions of their songs in various natural settings in Yellowstone National Park (with the exception of "Shallow," which was recorded acoustically in the studio). The version of "Rest of My Life" from this recording was released as a music video and reached No. 16 on US modern rock charts. The album peaked at No. 134 on the Billboard 200.

Most of the songs performed are from the band's preceding two albums, 1998's Unwritten Law and 2002's Elva. It would be the band's final recording with founding drummer Wade Youman, who was ejected from the band shortly after, due to personal and professional issues, until he was reinstated in 2013

== Track listing ==
All lyrics are written by Scott Russo, except where noted.

No.	Title	Lyrics	Music	Length
1.	"Before I Go"	Russo, Wade Youman, Steve Morris	Russo, Morris, Rob Brewer, Youman	3:35
2.	"Rest of My Life"		Russo	2:32
3.	"Seein' Red"		Russo	3:41
4.	"Up All Night"		Russo	2:54
5.	"Blame It on Me"		Brewer, Russo, Wade Youman	3:01
6.	"Geronimo"		Russo, Morris, Youman, Brewer, Pat Kim	3:08
7.	"Cailin"		Russo, Morris, Brewer, Youman	3:56
8.	"Rescue Me"		Russo	3:34
9.	"Elva"		Russo, Nicholas Wright, Phil Jamieson	4:26
10.	"How You Feel"		Russo	2:41
11.	"Shallow"	Russo, Morris, Brewer, John Bell, Youman	Russo, Morris, Brewer, Bell, Youman	3:26
Total length:				36:54

== Personnel ==
=== Band ===
- Scott Russo – lead vocals
- Steve Morris – lead guitar, backing vocals
- Rob Brewer – rhythm guitar, backing vocals
- Pat "PK" Kim – bass guitar
- Wade Youman – drums

=== Production ===
- Don Worsham and Wil Burston – recording engineers
- John Alagia and Jeff Juliano – mixing
- Peter Harding – additional engineering and editing
- Baraka – Pro Tools

=== Artwork ===
- Jeff Nicholas and Marco Orozco – cover design and art direction
- Spencer Thornton and Steve Simmons – photography

== Chart positions ==
Chart positions for Singles from Music in High Places
Year	Single	Chart	Peak position
2003	"Rest of My Life"	US Modern Rock Tracks (Billboard)	16
