= Visit to Oz =

EP by Unwritten Law
- Released: June 1999
- Genre: Punk rock
- Label: Interscope; Rapido
- Producer: Rick Parashar; Gregg Brandalise

Unwritten Law chronology
Unwritten Law (1998)	Visit to Oz (1999)	Elva (2002)

Visit to Oz is an EP by the American punk rock band Unwritten Law, released in June 1999 by Interscope Records and Rapido Records. It was released only in Australia to coincide with the band's first headlining tour there and is currently out of print. It contains two songs from the band's 1998 album Unwritten Law and two demo tracks recorded in 1993, "Kill to Breathe" which would appear in its final form one year later on their 1994 debut Blue Room. The song "Driven", which had previously only appeared on the band's 1992 demo tape, is not available on any other release.

== Track listing ==
1. Cailin - 3:59
2. Lonesome (remix) - 3:24
3. Driven (1993 Demo) - 4:06
4. Kill to Breathe (1993 Demo) - 4:44

== Personnel ==
- Scott Russo - vocals
- Steve Morris - lead guitar
- Rob Brewer - rhythm guitar
- Micah Albao - bass (tracks 1–2)
- John Bell - bass (track 3–4)
- Wade Youman - drums
