= Wrecking Ball =

A wrecking ball is a heavy steel ball suspended from a crane that is used for demolition work.

Wrecking ball may also refer to:

== Music ==
=== Albums ===
- Wrecking Ball (Emmylou Harris album) (1995)
- Wrecking Ball (Dead Confederate album) (2008)
- Wrecking Ball (Bruce Springsteen album) (2012)
  - Wrecking Ball Tour, promotional tour 2012
- Wreckin' Ball, an album by The Hub (1994)

=== Songs ===
- "Wrecking Ball" (Neil Young song) (1989)
- "Wrecking Ball" (Bruce Springsteen song) (2009)
- "Wrecking Ball" (Miley Cyrus song) (2013)
- "Wrecking Ball", a song by 4Him from The Basics of Life
- "Wrecking Ball", a song by Agent 51 from The Red & the Black (2003)
- "Wrecking Ball", a song by Amelia Curran from Hunter, Hunter (2009)
- "Wrecking Ball", a song by Aubrey O'Day (2012)
- "Wrecking Ball", a song by Chris Pureka from How I Learned to See in the Dark (2010)
- "Wrecking Ball", a song by Creeper Lagoon from Take Back the Universe and Give Me Yesterday (2001)
- "Wrecking Ball", a song by Crooked Fingers from Dignity and Shame (2005)
- "Wrecking Ball", a song by Five Finger Death Punch from The Wrong Side of Heaven and the Righteous Side of Hell, Volume 2 (2013)
- "Wrecking Ball", a song by Frankmusik from Do It in the AM (2011)
- "Wrecking Ball", a song by Gama Bomb from The Terror Tapes (2013)
- "Wrecking Ball", a song by Gary Allan from Living Hard (2007)
- "Wrecking Ball", a song by Gillian Welch and David Rawlings from Soul Journey (2003)
- "Wrecking Ball", a song by Grace Slick from Welcome to the Wrecking Ball! (1981)
- "Wrecking Ball", a song by Halfcocked from Occupation: Rock Star (2000)
- "Wrecking Ball", a song by Harvey Danger from Where Have All the Merrymakers Gone? (1997)
- "Wrecking Ball", a song by Helix from Half-Alive (1998)
- "Wrecking Ball", a song by Iko from Ludo Says Hi (2009)
- "Wrecking Ball", a song by Interpol from Our Love to Admire (2007)
- "Wrecking Ball", a song by Kaiser Chiefs as B-side track of the initial release of "I Predict a Riot" (2004)
- "Wrecking Ball", a song by Joe Walsh from Analog Man (2012)
- "Wrecking Ball", a song by Lifehouse from Smoke & Mirrors (2010)
- "Wrecking Ball", a song by The Limousines from Hush (2013)
- "Wrecking Ball", a song by Loaded from The Taking (2009)
- "Wrecking Ball", a song by Mother Mother from O My Heart (2008)
- "Wrecking Ball", a song by Much the Same from Survive (2006)
- "Wrecking Ball", a song by Papa Vs Pretty from Heavy Harm' (2010)
- "Wrecking Ball", a song by Sidewalk Prophets from Live Like That (2012)
- "Wrecking Ball", a song by Slaid Cleaves
- "Wrecking Ball", a song by Smile Empty Soul from 3's (2012)
- "Wrecking Ball", a song by Terri Clark from Roots and Wings (2011)
- "Wrecking Ball", a song by Viva Voce
- "Wrecking Ball", a song by Vixen from Rev It Up (1990)
- "My Wrecking Ball", a song by Ryan Adams from Ryan Adams (2014)

== Literature ==
- Wrecking Ball Press, a UK small-press publisher
- Wrecking Ball, a novel by Christiana Spens
- Diary of a Wimpy Kid: Wrecking Ball, a children's novel by Jeff Kinney

== Other uses ==
- Wrecking Ball (Overwatch), a fictional, playable character in the 2016 video game Overwatch
- Frank Paul the Wrecking Ball, nickname for New Zealand professional rugby league player Frank-Paul Nu'uausala
- Wrecking Ball Brewpub, business establishment in the historic Kriegshaber House in Inman Park, Atlanta
- Wrecking Ball, a playable character in the Skylanders video game franchise

== See also ==
- Mark Recchi (born 1968), Canadian NHL ice hockey player, nicknamed "The Recchin' Ball"
- Balls of Steel (disambiguation)
