= Knuckle Up =

Knuckle Up may refer to:

- 3 Ninjas Knuckle Up, a 1993 comedy film directed by Shin Sang-ok
- Knuckle Up, a 2003 album by Black Pegasus
- "Knuckle Up", a story arc in the comic book series Scalped
