= She Says (Unwritten Law song) =

Single by Unwritten Law

from the album Here's to the Mourning
- Released: September 2005
- Recorded: 2004 at Ocean Recording, Glenwood Place, and Royaltone in Burbank, The Blue Room in Laurel Canyon, Pulse in Hollywood, and Sound Wherehouse in Sherman Oaks
- Genre: Alternative rock
- Label: Lava
- Songwriter(s): Scott Russo, Aimee Allen, Phil Jamieson
- Producer(s): Sean Beavan

Unwritten Law singles chronology
"Save Me (Wake Up Call)" (2005)	"She Says" (2005)	"Starships and Apocalypse" (2011)

Music video
- "She Says" on YouTube

"She Says" is a song by the San Diego–based rock band Unwritten Law, released as the second single from the band's 2005 album Here's to the Mourning. It was written by singer Scott Russo along with Aimee Allen and Phil Jamieson, and was produced by Sean Beavan. It reached No. 32 on Billboard's Alternative Songs chart.

== Track listing ==
All lyrics are written by Scott Russo and Aimee Allen

No.	Title	Music	Length
1.	"She Says"	Russo, Phil Jamieson	3:59
2.	"Get Up" (remix)	Russo, Steve Morris
3.	"F.I.G.H.T." (remix)	Russo

== Personnel ==
=== Band ===
- Scott Russo – lead vocals
- Steve Morris – lead guitar, backing vocals
- Rob Brewer – rhythm guitar, backing vocals
- Pat "PK" Kim – bass guitar
- Tony Palermo – drums on "She Says" and "Get Up"

=== Additional musicians ===
- Adrian Young – drums on "F.I.G.H.T."
- Ben Rosen – programming

=== Production ===
- Sean Beavan – producer, engineer, mixing
- Critter and Zach Barnhorst – engineers
- Zach Barnhorst, Jay Groin, James Murray, and Alex Pavlides – assistant engineers
- Brain Gardener – mastering
