= Swan (album) =

Studio album by Unwritten Law
- Released: March 29, 2011
- Genre: Alternative rock, pop punk
- Label: Suburban Noize Records

Unwritten Law chronology
Live and Lawless (2008)	Swan (2011)	The Hum (2022)

Swan is the seventh studio album by the San Diego–based punk band Unwritten Law. It was released on March 29, 2011, on Suburban Noize Records. It's the band's first album in six years, since 2005's Here's to the Mourning. This is their last album to feature lead guitarist Steve Morris and bassist Pat "PK" Kim, who left Unwritten Law late in 2011, and also their only studio album with Dylan Howard as their drummer; Howard later left in 2013.

In 2010, the band held a contest for fans to submit their designs for the album's cover art, and the band chose three different covers for the album, a different one for advanced copies, internet copies, and retail copies. The album's first single, "Starships and Apocalypse" was released on January 24, 2011.

== Track listing ==
1. "Starships and Apocalypse"
2. "Nevermind"
3. "Dark Dayz"
4. "Last Chance"
5. "Sing"
6. "Superbad"
7. "Let You Go"
8. "Chicken (Ready to Go)" (Feat. Del the Funky Homosapien)
9. "On My Own"
10. "Love Love Love"
11. "Swan Song"

== Charts ==
Chart performance for Swan
Chart (2011)	Peak position
Australian Albums (ARIA)	41
US Billboard 200	195
