= Rest of My Life =

Rest of My Life or The Rest of My Life may refer to:

== Songs ==
- Rest of my Life (Jonas Blue song), 2024
- "Rest of My Life" (Ludacris song), 2012
- "Rest of My Life" (Unwritten Law song), 2003
- "The Rest of My Life" (Prince song), 1999
- "The Rest of My Life" (Sloan song), 2003
- "Rest of My Life", a song by Kottonmouth Kings from Rollin' Stoned, 2002
- "Rest of My Life", a song by Nas from Street's Disciple
- "Rest of My Life", a song by Racey
- "The Rest of My Life", a song by Cheap Trick from We're All Alright!
- "The Rest of My Life", a song by Less Than Jake from In with the Out Crowd

== Television ==
- The Rest of My Life: Degrassi Takes Manhattan, a 2010 Canadian television film concluding season 9 of Degrassi: The Next Generation

== See also ==
- Tonight and the Rest of My Life, an album by Nina Gordon
