= Stray Bullets =

Stray Bullets may refer to:

- Stray Bullets (comics), American independent comic book series
- "Stray Bullets", eleventh song on Agent 51's 2000 album Just Keep Runnin'
- "Stray Bullets", sixth episode of the American Western television series Paradise (1988–91)
- Stray Bullets (film), a 2016 American thriller film

== See also ==
- Stray bullet
- Stray Bullet (disambiguation)
