= The Rattlesnake Aces =

American rock band

- Origin: San Diego
- Genres: Hard rock Rock; Heavy Metal
- Years active: 2010–Present
- Label: Super Trouble/Black Orchid
- Members: Chris Armes; Nathan Claar; Mario Escobar; Wade Youman
- Past members: Knife; Chris O'Gard; Joe Silva
- Website: facebook.com/therattlesnakeaces

The Rattlesnake Aces are an American rock band formed in 2008 from Poway, California (located in San Diego County), formed in 2010. The current lineup consists of front man/songwriter and guitar player Chris Armes, formerly of the notable punk band Agent 51, drummer Wade Youman, former drummer of the widely successful rock band Unwritten Law, original singer of Unwritten Law Nathan Claar, and lead guitarist Mario Escobar of the band Bi-Polar Meltdown.

== Band history ==
=== Formation ===
The Rattlesnake Aces formed in 2008 after both Armes and Youman leaving previous notable bands Unwritten Law and Agent 51. Initially, each band member was part of a thriving local punk rock movement that included other groups such as blink-182 and Unwritten Law. Founding member Chris Armes had attended Poway High School with blink-182 member Tom DeLonge, and both Armes' and Youman's previous bands Unwritten Law and Agent 51 had toured with or played as openers for blink-182 on several occasions.

== Albums ==
On November 11, 2011, the Rattlesnake Aces released their first full length record entitled Black Pegasus to CD, digital, and vinyl formats.
