= CPK =

CPK may refer to:

== Businesses and organizations ==
- California Pizza Kitchen, a restaurant chain
- Chesapeake Utilities (New York Stock Exchange symbol CPK)
- Communist Party of Kampuchea, commonly known as the Khmer Rouge
- Communist Party of Korea, a former political party in Korea
- Communist Party of Kenya, a Kenyan political party

== Science and technology ==
- Process capability index (C_{pk}), a measure of process capability
- CPK coloring, a way to color atoms when visualizing molecular models
- Creatine phosphokinase, an enzyme found in humans, or alternatively a blood test for it

== Transport ==
- Carpenders Park railway station, England (National Rail station code CPK)
- Central Communication Port (Polish: Centralny Port Komunikacyjny), a planned airport in Poland

== Other uses ==
- "C.P.K." (Unwritten Law song)
- Cabbage Patch Kids, a line of children's dolls
- Cosmic Princess Kaguya!, a 2026 Japanese animated musical yuri fantasy film
