= Repentance (Lee "Scratch" Perry album) =

Studio album by Lee "Scratch" Perry
- Released: 19 August 2008
- Label: Narnack
- Producer: Lee "Scratch" Perry, Andrew W.K.

Lee "Scratch" Perry chronology
The Mighty Upsetter (2008)	Repentance (2008)	Scratch Came Scratch Saw Scratch Conquered (2008)

Professional ratings
Review scores
Source	Rating
AllMusic	3.5/5 stars
Okayplayer	71/100

Repentance is the title of the fifty-fourth studio album by Jamaican musician and record producer Lee "Scratch" Perry. It was released on August 19, 2008, by Narnack Records.

Repentance is co-produced by Andrew W.K., and features guest appearances from Aimee Allen, Moby, Don Fleming, Brian Chippendale, Josh Werner, Ari Up, and Sasha Grey.

CMJ New Music Report states "The background of Lee 'Scratch' Perry's 54th studio album is the traditional reggae rhythms and chill-out vocals that have defined his sound over the years. But this time it is drenched in sharp electronic effects, fast driving beats and production by Perry's good friend Andrew W.K. The eclectic mix of influences keeps Perry pumping out tracks that are fresh and club ready."

Spin states the "album enhances Perry's oddball mystique, though not his legacy. Percolating tracks such as 'Pum Pum' and 'Chooga Cane' are more like undercooked, meandering jams than songs, mixing loose grooves and breezy synths as the profane Perry portrays a muttering old codger."

Glide Magazine's David Calarco states "Despite the modern twists integrated on his new album, Perry still holds true to his Jamaican dancehall roots backing most of these genre-hopping songs with aspects of traditional dub palates."

== Track listing ==
1. "Shine"
2. "Fire"
3. "Pum-Pum"
4. "Reggae Man"
5. "Baby Sucker"
6. "Crazy Pimp"
7. "War Dance"
8. "God Save His King"
9. "Santa Claus"
10. "Heart Doctor"
11. "Chooga Cane"
12. "Party Time"
