= Red Alert (Agent 51 album) =

Studio album by Agent 51
- Released: 1998
- Recorded: 1998
- Genre: Punk rock
- Length: 57:11
- Label: Alphabet
- Producer: Agent 51

Agent 51 chronology
Demos and More (1998)	Red Alert (1998)	Just Keep Runnin' (2000)

Red Alert is the debut album by the Poway, California punk rock band Agent 51, released by Alphabet Records in 1998. It established the band's presence in the local punk rock scene. Some of the songs and the album artwork detail the band's fascination with UFOs, extraterrestrials and the possible coverup of their existence by the United States government. An independent music video was filmed for the title track.

After the song "San Diego's Burning" the album has 31 blank tracks, then at 0:51 into track 51 there is a "hidden" semi-instrumental version of "Red Alert," with vocals only on the chorus. After the song, on the same track, there is a clip from the "Area 51" radio program.

== Track listing ==
All tracks are written by Chris Armes and Jered Herndon.

No.	Title	Length
1.	"Red Alert"	2:37
2.	"Work All Day"	2:!5
3.	"Boot to the Brain"	2:21
4.	"Designed"	2:59
5.	"Left Me with Nothin'"	2:21
6.	"5 Miles to Bellevue"	3:01
7.	"Homecoming Queen"	1:47
8.	"The War"	3:27
9.	"Boomerang"	2:27
10.	"No Way"	1:53
11.	"Hitman"	1:57
12.	"Swingin' Doors" (written and originally performed by Merle Haggard))	2:10
13.	"Surprise, Surprise"	2:42
14.	"Gather 'Round"	2:14
15.	"Chuck"	2:26
16.	"Deadlines and Commitments"	2:33
17.	"I'm Not Going Anywhere"	2:37
18.	"Conditioned"	2:10
19.	"San Diego's Burning"	3:27
51.	"Red Alert" (reprise) / "Area 51 radio clip" (hidden track; begins at 0:51)	2:39

- Tracks 20–50 each consist of 4–6 seconds of silence.

== Personnel ==
- Chris "Broken" Armes - guitar, vocals
- Eric "Airwick" Davis - guitar, vocals
- Greg Schneider - bass, vocals
- Rob Hunter - drums

=== Production ===
- Record label: Alphabet Records
- Recorded at DML Studios November 24–26, 1997 by Scott Exum
- Mastered at DML Studios
- Produced by Agent 51
- All songs copyright 1996-1997 Agent 51, except "Swingin' Doors" by Merle Haggard
- Cover design by Agent 51
- Layout by David Klinker
