= Stray Bullet =

Stray Bullet may refer to:

- Stray bullet, a bullet that hits an unintended target
- Stray Bullet (1960 Korean film), a film by Yu Hyun-mok and based on Yi Beomseon's novella Obaltan
- Stray Bullet (2010 film) (رصاصة طايشة), a 2010 Lebanese film by Georges Hachem
- Stray Bullet Games, an American video game development company founded in 2006
- "Stray Bullet", a song by Bruce Springsteen on the 2015 album The Ties That Bind: The River Collection
- "Stray Bullet", a 1997 song by KMFDM from Symbols
- "Stray Bullet", a 1994 song by Organized Konfusion from Stress: The Extinction Agenda
- "Nagaredama", literally "Stray Bullet", a 2021 single by Japanese female idol group Sakurazaka46
- An episode of The Powerpuff Girls.

== See also ==
- Stray Bullets (disambiguation)
