= A Little Happiness =

Studio album by Aimee Allen
- Released: July 21, 2009
- Genre: Pop-folk, reggae fusion
- Length: 40:10
- Label: Side Tracked

Aimee Allen chronology
I'd Start a Revolution If I Could Get up in the Morning (2003)	A Little Happiness (2009)

Professional ratings
Review scores
Source	Rating
Allmusic	3.5/5 stars
Rock on Request	(favorable)

A Little Happiness is the second studio album and the first album to be released from American pop/rock singer-songwriter Aimee Allen, released on July 21, 2009, by Side Tracked Records. The album generated the single, "On Vacation" (#49 Billboard Hot AC). "Calling the Maker" is featured on Tap Tap Revenge 3.

== Track listing ==
No.	Title	Writer(s)	Length
1.	"Change in Weather"		3:00
2.	"Save Me"	Aimee Allen, Linda Perry, Scott Russo	4:04
3.	"On Vacation"	Aimee Allen, Lucian Piane	3:20
4.	"Crazy"	Aimee Allen, Scott Russo	3:26
5.	"Calling The Maker"		4:02
6.	"Santeria"	Bradley Nowell, Bud Gaugh, Eric Wilson	3:25
7.	"Silence is Violence"		3:37
8.	"La La Land"	Aimee Allen, Scott Russo	2:57
9.	"A Little Happiness"		3:18
10.	"Lean into Me"		4:05
11.	"God Talks"		4:56
