= Save Me (Wake Up Call) =

Single by Unwritten Law

from the album Here's to the Mourning
- Released: May 2, 2005
- Recorded: 2004 at Ocean Recording, Glenwood Place, and Royaltone in Burbank, The Blue Room in Laurel Canyon, Pulse in Hollywood, and Sound Wherehouse in Sherman Oaks
- Genre: Alternative rock; pop punk
- Length: 3:34
- Label: Lava
- Songwriters: Scott Russo; Aimee Allen; Linda Perry
- Producers: Sean Beavan; Linda Perry

Unwritten Law singles chronology
"Rest of My Life" (2003)	"Save Me (Wake Up Call)" (2005)	"She Says" (2005)

"Save Me (Wake Up Call)" is a song by the San Diego–based rock band Unwritten Law, released as the first single from the band's 2005 album Here's to the Mourning. It became the second highest-charting single of the band's career, reaching No. 5 on Billboard's Modern Rock Tracks chart.

== Background ==
The song was written by singer Scott Russo along with Aimee Allen, the label didn’t like the chorus that was written, and after working on several different choruses, the label suggested to Russo and Allen that they collaborate with someone to help work on the song, they chose Linda Perry, as Russo had stated in an interview at the time:

They offered to get us with The Matrix and some other people and we were like, “No, no, no, no.” And they’re like, “Linda Perry? You wanna write with her?” We’re like, “Yeah, she’s cool.

It wasn’t a collaboration on the song; we’d already written the song. We came in and she just helped us change a couple chords in the chorus and then just finished the melody with us. So it was more a collaboration with me and my girlfriend and Linda came in and polished up the chorus.

== Track listing ==
All lyrics are written by Scott Russo and Aimee Allen.

No.	Title	Music	Producer	Length
1.	"Save Me (Wake Up Call)" (radio edit)	Russo, Linda Perry, Allen	Sean Beavan, Perry
2.	"Save Me" (Reggae mix)	Russo, Perry, Allen
3.	"Slow Dance" (remix)	Russo, Pat Kim

== Personnel ==
=== Band ===
- Scott Russo – lead vocals
- Steve Morris – lead guitar, backing vocals
- Rob Brewer – rhythm guitar, backing vocals
- Pat "PK" Kim – bass guitar
- Tony Palermo – drums

=== Additional musicians ===
- Ben Rosen – programming

=== Production ===
- Sean Beavan – producer, engineer, mixing
- Linda Perry – producer of "Save Me (Wake Up Call)" (with Beavan)
- Critter and Zach Barnhorst – engineers
- Zach Barnhorst, Jay Groin, James Murray, and Alex Pavlides – assistant engineers
- Brain Gardener – mastering

== Release history ==
Release dates and formats for "Save Me (Wake Up Call)"
Region	Date	Format	Label(s)	Ref.
United States	February 15, 2005	Mainstream airplay	Lava	
