= Pivit =

American punk rock band

- Origin: San Diego, California, U.S.
- Genres: Punk rock, melodic hardcore
- Years active: 1994–2003, 2008–2009, 2015–present
- Label: Red Eye
- Past members: Mark McLemore (drums, 1994-1998); Chris Moore (vocals); Eric Sisson (guitar, 1994-1997); James Banister (guitar); Micah Albao (bass); Chris Lewis (guitar, 1997-2003 2015); Adam Rapps (drums, 1998-2003)

Pivit is an American punk rock band hailing from Poway and Cardiff, California, formed in late 1994 by original drummer Mark McLemore, lead singer Chris Moore, and guitarist Eric Sisson in San Diego County, California. In 1995, they recorded their first demo entitled Find the Fuzz. Eventually they produced 3 albums together, Pressure in 1996, Millennium in 1998 and finally Thanks for Coming Back in 2002.

The band enjoyed moderate success, earning heavy praise from critics and fans and opening for such bands as Blink-182, Incubus, MxPx, Buck-O-Nine, Sack Lunch, Pennywise, Unwritten Law, Mad Caddies, Ten Foot Pole, Home Grown and many local San Diego bands. In June 1998, a video was shot for Pivit's song "Oddessy" in Rancho Bernardo and downtown San Diego, directed by Taylor Steele. A music video was made in 2002 for the song "Fingercuffs", and a video was also made for "Millennium", but only played at live shows.

Since disbanding in 2003, there have been a few reunion shows with Agent 51, Sack Lunch, and Spero Lumina throughout 2008 and 2009. and 2015

== Former members ==
- Chris Moore—vocals
- Micah Albao—bass
- Eric Sisson—guitar, 1994–1997
- James Banister—guitar
- Mark McLemore—drums, 1994–1998
- Chris Lewis—guitar, 1997–2003
- Adam Rapps—drums, 1998–2003

== Discography ==
=== Albums ===
==== Pressure ====
Released in 1996 on Red Eye Records. Produced by Scott Russo of Unwritten Law.

1. "Tell Me"
2. "Open Book"
3. "Light of Day"
4. "Hangnail"
5. "Problem Child"
6. "Control's a Pity"
7. "W.D.I.W.T.S."
8. "Pressure"
9. "Army Man"
10. "Home Sweet Home"
11. "One Minute More"

==== Millennium ====
Released in 1998 on Red Eye Records. Album art by Wade Youman of Unwritten Law. Produced by Pivit.

1. "Intro"
2. "Millennium"
3. "Running Out"
4. "Structure"
5. "Vampire"
6. "Oddessy"
7. "Sour"
8. "Unseen"
9. "On My Own"
10. "Swell"
11. "Stuck On You"
12. "Crash" (Contains a hidden acoustic bonus track after 2 minutes of silence)

==== Thanks for Coming Back ====
Released on September 3, 2002 from Red Eye Records. Produced by Ryan Greene. Recorded in September 2001 at Engine Famous Studios in San Francisco, California.

1. "Redo"
2. "Fingercuffs"
3. "That Girl"
4. "Middle Children"
5. "Sex and Suicide"
6. "Dawson's Creek"
7. "Pop Whore"
8. "Crucified"
9. "Speechless"
10. "Cyberchrist"
11. "From My Bedroom"
12. "Pseudolebrity"

=== Find the Fuzz ===
Released in 1995. Recorded at DML Studios. The tape cover featured a photo of girls from a Guess Jeans ad.

1. "Open Book"
2. "Night on the Town"
3. "I Don't Know"
4. "Wait"
5. "Dream Girl"
6. "W.D.I.W.T.S."
7. "Wasted Time Away"
8. "Golden Arches"

== In popular culture ==
- Pivit's song "One Minute More" was featured during an interview with Kris Markovich in an episode of the skateboarding-themed BlueTorch TV series.
- "Tell Me" was featured in 411VM Issue 31.
- The songs "Fingercuffs" and "Middle Children" were featured in the soundtrack of the PC port of Crazy Taxi, and were again featured along with "Cyberchrist" and "Redo" in the Microsoft Windows port of Crazy Taxi 3: High Roller.
- The song "Cyberchrist" was featured in the 2003 video game Ford Racing 2.
