= Agent 51 =

American punk rock band

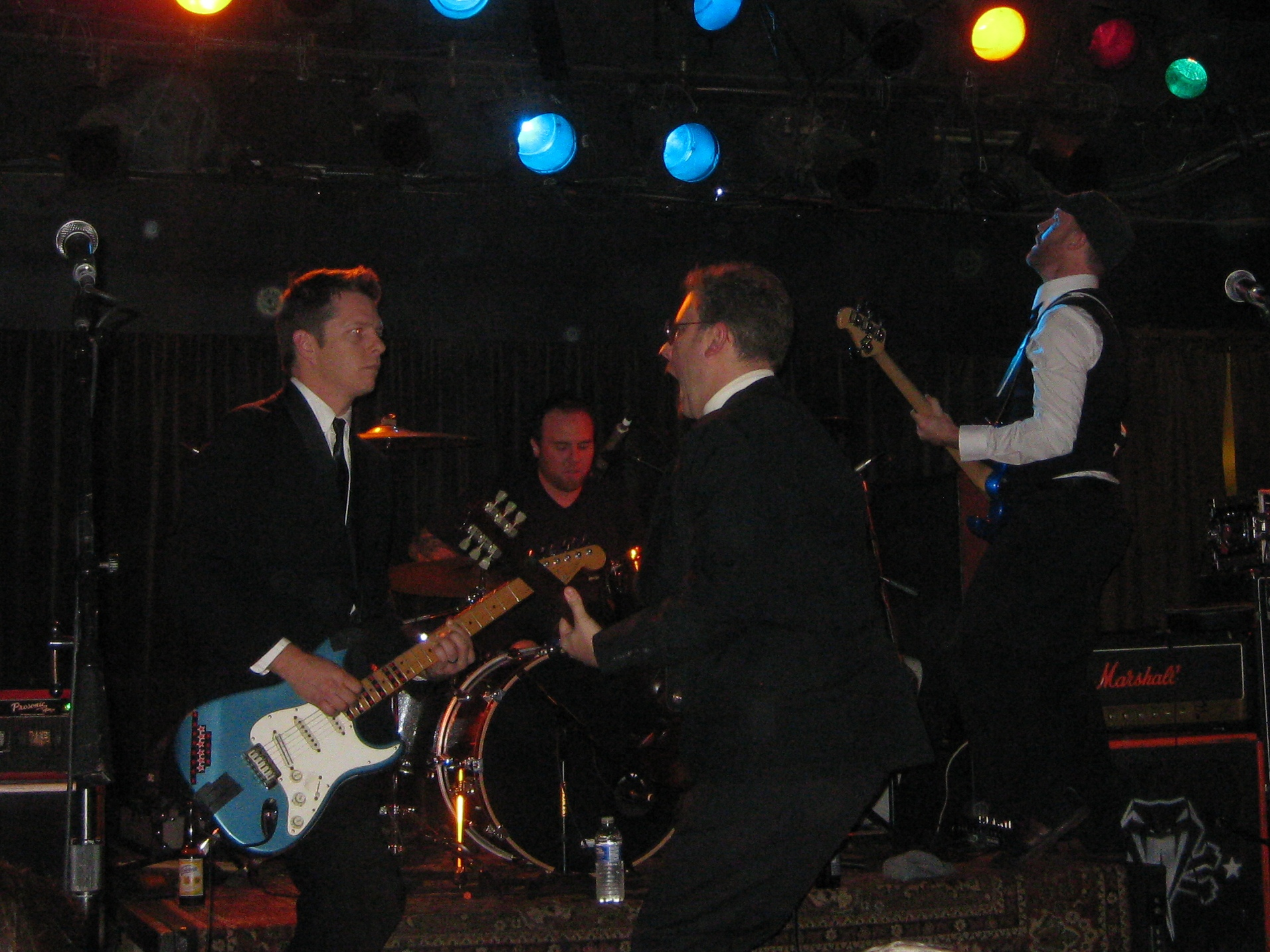
- Left to right: Davis, Levinson, Armes, and Schneider in 2012

Background information
- Origin: Poway, California
- Genres: Punk rock, pop punk, rock and roll
- Years active: 1995–2005, 2008, 2012, 2015, 2018, 2019, 2022, 2023-present
- Labels: Alphabet, Suburban Hooligans, Adeline, Surfdog
- Members: Chris Armes; Eric Davis; Greg Schneider; Mikey Levinson
- Past members: Jered Herndon; Rob Hunter; Sean Scura
- Website: agent51.net

Agent 51 is an American punk rock band from Poway, California, formed in 1995. They released three albums on various record labels before going on indefinite hiatus in 2005. The band played several reunion shows between 2008 and 2022, before returning to active status in 2023. Over the course of their career their music evolved from straightforward punk rock to incorporate aspects of classic rock and heavy metal. The band has maintained a mythology about their origins, which purports them to be rogue secret agents on the run from a clandestine government organization with ties to extraterrestrials.

== Band history ==
=== Formation ===
Agent 51 formed in Poway, California in 1995 under the name Area 51. Initially, the band were part of a thriving local punk rock movement that included other groups such as Blink-182 and Unwritten Law. Founding members Chris Armes, Jered Herndon, and Eric Davis had attended Poway High School with Blink-182 member Tom DeLonge, and Armes' previous band Openfast had played as openers for Blink-182 on several occasions. This experience contributed to the impetus for forming Area 51.

The band's original lineup consisted of Chris Armes on guitar and vocals, Jered Herndon on bass guitar and vocals, and Eric "Airwick" Davis on drums. Herndon and Armes met in kindergarten and first started playing music together at age 13. After the breakup of Openfast, the two began Area 51 together, writing the band's first songs. Eric Davis joined the group shortly after, and the three collaborated on a core of tunes for their eponymous demo, including "Chuck", "Designed", "Runnin' Outta Luck", and "Homecoming Queen"; songs that remain fan favorites to this day. Area 51 began to grow a following with the demo release, but personal issues would lead to Herndon leaving the band in 1997. The band had previously discussed changing their name due to the number of other groups calling themselves Area 51. Herndon was replaced by Greg Schneider, who suggested the name "Agent 51" so that they could continue to use the "neighborhood watch" character Armes had designed and the name stuck. Davis moved to second guitar and Rob Hunter joined as drummer. Later, the band would re-record the songs from the original demo along with new material and release it under the title Red Alert.

=== Early albums and mythology ===
Their first album, Red Alert, was released in 1998 by local label Alphabet Records. The album gained them notoriety in the local punk rock scene, and an independent music video was filmed for the title track. Armes took the stage name "Broken Armes" at this time due to an injury he suffered in 1997 which left his arm in a cast. In order to record his guitar parts on Red Alert he removed the cast himself and recorded while still injured.

Around this time the band began disseminating the mythos that they were rogue secret agents on the run from the government due to their knowledge of secrets related to extraterrestrial life. Schneider's influence matched this theme, suggesting the band wear matching black suits while performing. It also became common for the band to cover songs from the classic rock and 1970s metal genres in concert, such as AC/DC's "You Shook Me All Night Long" and "Highway to Hell."

By the recording of their second album in 2000, Hunter had been replaced on drums by Mike "Mikey L" Levinson. The album, Just Keep Runnin', was released that year on the band's own label Suburban Hooligans Records. The music was faster and slightly less punk-based than Red Alert, and included several songs that had become favorites in the band's live set over the last few years such as "Who's Gunna Riot?" and "The Last Pirate Standing." The album's artwork and liner notes greatly expanded on their secret agent mythos by describing each member as a rogue agent enhanced with superpowers through extraterrestrial DNA and technology, as well as detailing their struggle against a secret government organization called "The Agency." The band played on the Warped Tour that summer on the Ernie Ball side stage, winning Ernie Ball's Battle of the Bands competition. They also recorded the theme song for the short-lived San Diego public-access television cable TV show "Radiation Nation." The song was later included on the 2001 Warped Tour compilation.

Just Keep Runnin' caught the attention of Billie Joe Armstrong of Green Day and his label Adeline Records, who re-released it in 2001 with 2 bonus tracks recorded with new bassist Sean Scura, as Schneider had by then left the group. The band continued to tour, playing at San Diego's Street Scene and other festivals.

=== Success and break-up ===
Agent 51's next album was 2003's The Red & the Black, released on southern California label Surfdog Records. With it the band moved towards a sound more reminiscent of classic rock and Heavy Metal bands such as AC/DC, Motörhead and Def Leppard. They also distanced themselves from their secret agent mythos by not mentioning extraterrestrials or conspiracies, and by ceasing to wear their matching suits in concert. The song "She's My Heroine" received airplay on local rock radio station 91X, while "American Rock n Roll" was used in the opening episode of MTV's The Real World: San Diego and "Air Raid" was later used in the video game Big Mutha Truckers 2. The album was nominated in several categories at the 2003 San Diego Music Awards and won for "best punk album."

Despite their growing popularity, however, Armes announced that he was leaving the band due to musical and financial pressures. Davis and Levinson formed 51 Guns in the summer of 2004, along with drummer Adam Rapps of Pivit. Agent 51 remained inactive until June 2005.

=== Reunion and recent activity ===
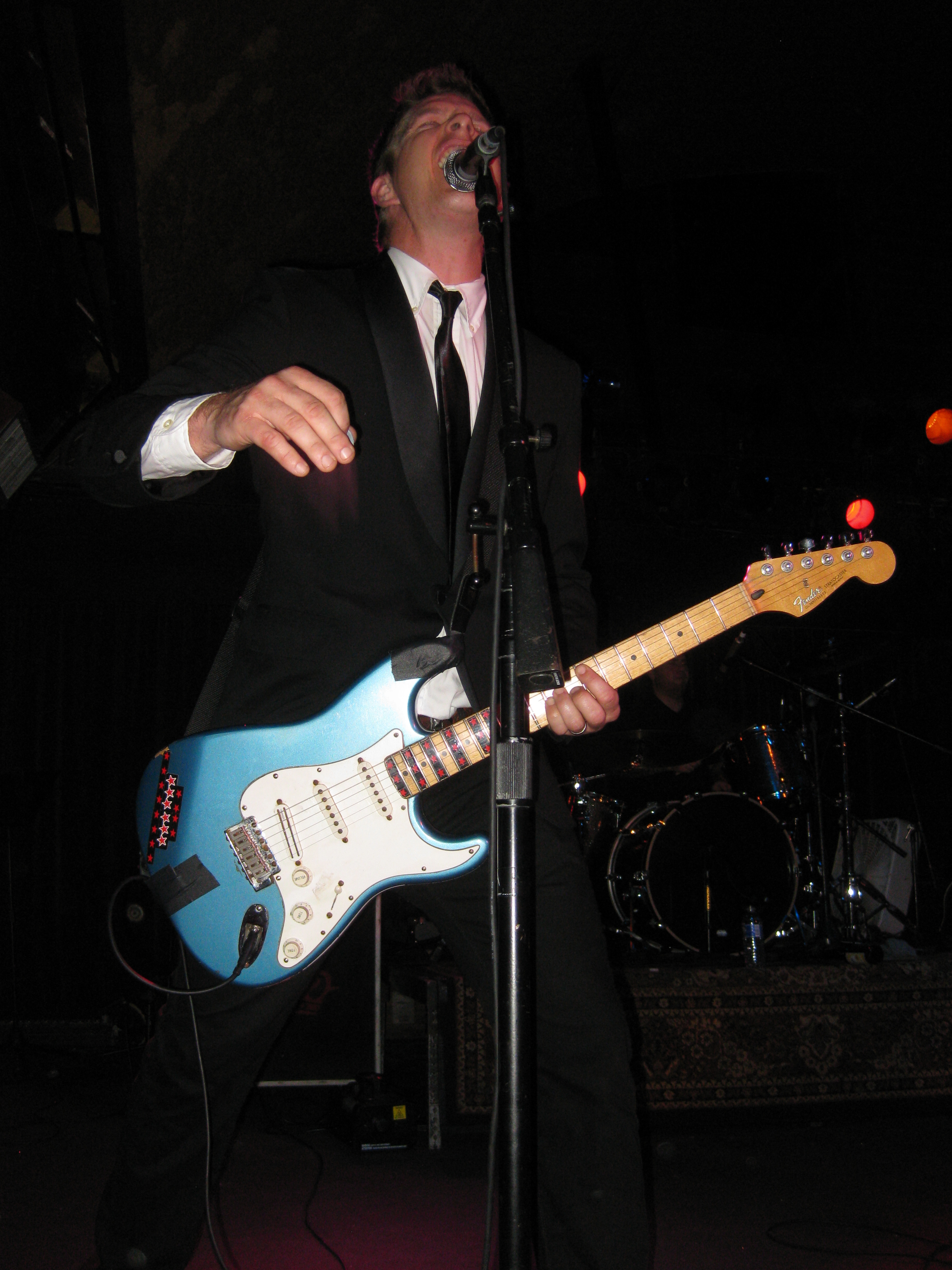
Davis performing with Agent 51 in January 2012

On June 5, 2005 Agent 51 played a reunion show at SOMA, an all-ages music venue in San Diego. This performance featured the most recent lineup of the band including Armes, Davis, and Scura, with drummer Adam Rapps replacing Levinson. The band once again wore matching black suits and made reference to "The Agency" and other aspects of their secret agent mythos. The band remained mostly inactive after this reunion show. Davis resumed playing with 51 Guns, who renamed themselves Arm the Angels in 2006. Scura moved to Utah but eventually returned to San Diego. Levinson left 51 Guns, reuniting with Schneider to form The Megas, a video-game rock band based in Los Angeles. Armes, meanwhile, announced his involvement with The Rattlesnake Aces. Agent 51 played a "comeback" show with Pivit and Arm the Angels in February 2008 with the lineup of Armes, Davis, Scura, and Levinson, with Greg Schneider also performing on several songs. The band reunited again in July 2008, performing with Pivit and Arm the Angels. To coincide with this concert, the band and Alphabet Records re-released Red Alert through iTunes and other digital retailers. Another reunion show was performed in Jan 2012 with the classic lineup coinciding with a brand new 2 song E.P. released digitally to iTunes entitled 'Operation Panther.' The band played more reunion shows in 2018, 2019, and 2022. In early 2021, Chris released his first solo album Ocotillo Rose. The first single 'Lord Let Me Run' debuted on Yucca Thunder Records with plans to digitally release the remaining singles from the album throughout 2021. Agent 51 returned to the studio in 2023, releasing their first new music in over a decade with the singles Tear it All Down, Let Me Go, Mystifying, and Going for the Vault. They returned to the stage in 2024 for a show with Unwritten Law at the Observatory in North Park, and decided to begin work on a new album. After crowdfunding the recording budget, they released their new album "Age of Validation" on June 6th, 2025.

== Band members ==
Agent 51 lineups (only official members listed)
(1995-1997) as Area 51	Chris Armes - guitar, vocals; Jered Herndon - bass, vocals; Eric Davis - drums
(1997–1999) Demos and More Red Alert	Chris Armes - guitar, vocals; Eric Davis - guitar, vocals; Greg Schneider - bass; Rob Hunter - drums
(2000) Just Keep Runnin'	Chris Armes - guitar, vocals; Eric Davis - guitar, vocals; Greg Schneider - bass; Mikey Levinson - drums
(2001–2003) The Red & the Black	Chris Armes - guitar, vocals; Eric Davis - guitar, vocals; Sean Scura - bass; Mikey Levinson - drums
(2005) reunion show	Chris Armes - guitar, vocals; Eric Davis - guitar, vocals; Sean Scura - bass; Adam Rapps - drums
(2008 and 2012) reunion shows	Chris Armes - guitar, vocals; Eric Davis - guitar, vocals; Sean Scura - bass; Greg Schneider - bass; Mikey Levinson - drums

=== Current members ===
- Chris "Broken" Armes - guitar, lead vocals
- Eric "Airwick / E-Rock" Davis - guitar, vocals
- Greg Schneider - bass, vocals
- Mike "Mikey Hell" Levinson - drums

=== Past members ===
- Jered Herndon - bass (1995-1997)
- Rob Hunter - drums (1997–1999)
- Sean Scura - bass (2001–2008)
- Adam Rapps - drums (2005 reunion show)

== Discography ==
Agent 51 discography
- Studio albums: 4
- Extended plays: 1
- Music videos: 1
- Demo: 1
- Other appearances: 6

The discography of Agent 51 consists of four studio albums, one EP, one demo, and one music video.

=== Studio albums ===
Year	Album details
1998	Red Alert: Released: 1998; Label: Alphabet; Format: CD
2000	Just Keep Runnin': Released: 2000; Label: Suburban Hooligans^{[I]} / Adeline Records; Format: CD
2003	The Red & the Black: Released: April 22, 2003; Label: Surfdog; Format: CD
2025	Age of Validation: Released: 2025; Label: Suburban Hooligans; Format: Vinyl/Digital

I Just Keep Runnin' was re-released in 2001 by Adeline Records.

=== Extended plays ===
Year	Album details
2003	Agent 51^{[I]}: Released: 2003; Label: Surfdog; Format: CD

I Agent 51 is a pre-release teaser with four songs from The Red & the Black.

=== Extended plays ===
Year	Album details
2012	Operation Panther E.P.: Released: 2012; Label: Suburban Hooligans; Format: download

=== Singles ===
Year	Album details
2023	Tear It All Down: Released: 2023; Label: Suburban Hooligans; Format: download and streaming

=== Singles ===
Year	Album details
2023	Let Me Go: Released: November 2023; Label: Suburban Hooligans; Format: download and streaming

=== Demos ===
Year	Album details
1998	Demos and More^{[I]}: Released: 1998; Label: MP3.com; Format: CD, music download

I Demos and More consists of demos and finished tracks for Red Alert.

=== Music videos ===
Year	Song	Director	Album
1998	"Red Alert"		Red Alert

Year 2000	Song Radiation Nation	Director Flax Glor	Album Warped Tour 2000 - Compilation
1999	"Radiation Nation"		Radiation Nation

=== Other appearances ===
The following Agent 51 songs were released on compilation albums and as music downloads. This is not an exhaustive list; songs that were first released on the band's albums are not included.

Year	Release details	Track
1998	Pete's Comp: Kids in America: Released: 1998; Label: Alphabet; Format: CD	"Fight for Your Right" (originally performed by the Beastie Boys)
1999	Released: 1999; Label: none; Format: download	"Hardcore Hooligan"
2001	Warped Tour 2001 Tour Compilation: Released: June 19, 2001; Label: SideOneDummy; Format: CD	"Radiation Nation"^{[I]}
2002	Every Dog Will Have Its Day: Released: June 25, 2002; Label: Adeline; Format: CD	"Wrecking Ball"^{[II]}
2005	91X Loudspeaker: Released: 2005; Label: Budweiser True Music; Format: CD	"Sandra Dee"
2006	Released: 2006; Label: none; Format: download	"Automatic Addicts" (demo)

I "Radiation Nation" was originally recorded as the theme song for a local San Diego punk rock television show.

II This is an early version of "Wrecking Ball"; the song was re-recorded for The Red & the Black.
