= Up All Night (Unwritten Law song) =

Single by Unwritten Law

from the album Elva
- Released: November 6, 2001
- Recorded: 2001
- Studio: Total Access, Redondo Beach, California
- Genre: Punk rock; pop rock
- Length: 3:03
- Label: Interscope
- Songwriters: Rob Brewer; Pat "PK" Kim; Steve Morris; Scott Russo; Wade Youman
- Producers: Miguel; Unwritten Law; John Shanks; Steve Morris; Scott Russo

Unwritten Law singles chronology
"Lonesome" (2000)	"Up All Night" (2001)	"Seein' Red" (2002)

Music video
- "Up All Night" on YouTube

"Up All Night" is a song by the San Diego–based rock band Unwritten Law, released as the first single from the band's 2002 album Elva. It was written by singer Scott Russo and produced by Michael "Miguel" Happoldt. It was their second song to chart, reaching number 14 on Billboard's Modern Rock Tracks chart.

== Track listing ==
All lyrics are written by Scott Russo.

No.	Title	Music	Producer	Length
1.	"Up All Night"	Unwritten Law, Inspired by Grinspoons 'Busy' from 'Pushing buttons' EP 1998. Credit- Phil Jamieson and Pat Davern	Miguel, Unwritten Law	3:03
2.	"Darkside"	Russo, James Banister	John Shanks	5:24
3.	"Baby, Baby" (demo)	Russo, Rob Brewer	Steve Morris, Russo	3:25
Total length:				11:52

== Personnel ==
=== Band ===
- Scott Russo – vocals, mix engineer of "Darkside", producer of "Baby, Baby"
- Steve Morris – lead guitar, producer of "Baby, Baby"
- Rob Brewer – rhythm guitar
- Pat "PK" Kim – bass guitar

=== Additional musicians ===
- Josh Freese – drums on "Up All Night"
- Marshall Goodman – percussion on "Up All Night"

=== Production ===
- Miguel – producer of "Up All Night", additional production on "Darkside"
- John Shanks – producer of "Darkside"
- David J. Holman – mix engineer of "Up All Night"
- Eddie Ashworth – engineer of "Up All Night" and "Darkside"
- Mike McMullen – assistant engineer of "Up All Night", additional engineering on "Darkside"
- Dan Chase and Baraka – Pro Tools on "Up All Night" and "Darkside"
- Tal Herzberg – Pro Tools on "Darkside"
- Mark DeSisto – engineer of "Darkside"
- Toby Miller – mix engineer of "Darkside"
- Brian Garder – mastering

=== Artwork ===
- Dean Karr – photography

== Charts ==
Chart performance for "Up All Night"
Chart (2001)	Peak position
Australia (ARIA)	71
US Modern Rock (Billboard)	14
