= Balls of Steel =

Balls of Steel may refer to:

- Balls of Steel (video game), a pinball video game
- Balls of Steel (TV series), a British comedy show hosted by Mark Dolan
- Balls of Steel Australia, Australian TV series based on the British show
- Balls of Steel (Kathy Griffin special), a 2009 stand-up comedy special by comic Kathy Griffin
- Balls of steel, a common catch-phrase from the videogame character Duke Nukem
