= Just Keep Runnin' =

Studio album by Agent 51
- Released: 2000
- Recorded: May–September 2000
- Genre: Punk rock
- Length: 50:37
- Label: Suburban Hooligans, Adeline
- Producer: Agent 51

Agent 51 chronology
Red Alert (1998)	Just Keep Runnin' (2000)	The Red & the Black (2003)

Just Keep Runnin' is a punk rock album by the Poway, California band Agent 51. It was first released in 2000 on the band's own Suburban Hooligans Records label, then was re-released in 2001 by Adeline Records with additional tracks. It was the band's second album and expanded their punk rock sound to include influences of classic rock and heavy metal. It also greatly expanded the band's secret agent mythos, with the liner notes extensively detailing the comic book-style secret origins of the band and its members. According to the story, the band members were rogue secret agents with psychic, cybernetic and alien-enhanced abilities who were struggling against a secret government organization known as "The Agency." The Agency sought to use satellites to control the minds of Earth's population, and Agent 51's mission was to expose the Agency's secrets to the general public disguised as an ordinary rock band. The songs "C.I.A.F.B.I." and "Psychic Spies" dealt directly with this theme. The songs "The Last Pirate Standing", "Free-Wheel" and "Who's Gunna Riot?" had been part of the band's live set for several years under the titles "The Pirate Song", "Free-Wheel Burning" and "Riot."

== Reception ==
Stewart Mason of Allmusic gave Just Keep Runnin' three stars out of five, calling it "basically insubstantial, but a lot of fun" and saying that the band has "a Dickies-like tongue-in-cheek quality".

== Track listing ==
All tracks are written by Chris Armes, except 'The Chosen Ones' by Eric Davis, Chris Armes.

No.	Title	Length
1.	"If It's Blood You Want..."	1:41
2.	"Straight Outta Hell"	2:54
3.	"C.I.A.F.B.I."	2:41
4.	"Screamin' for Justice"	2:24
5.	"Had Enough"	3:13
6.	"Let It Roll"	2:51
7.	"Lock n' Load"	3:38
8.	"Midland Road"	2:49
9.	"The Chosen Ones"	3:17
10.	"Detonated"	2:32
11.	"Stray Bullets"	2:53
12.	"The Blacklist"	2:58
13.	"Psychic Spies"	2:07
14.	"The Last Pirate Standing" (listed as "The Last Pirate Song" on Adeline Records re-release)	3:18
15.	"6th Street Lockdown"	3:08
16.	"Free-Wheel"	3:17
17.	"Who's Gunna Riot?"	2:14
18.	"I Believe"	2:42
Total length:		50:37

Adeline Records re-release bonus tracks
No.	Title	Length
19.	"Programmed" (Armes, Davis, Levinson, Sean Scura)	3:08
20.	"Date with the Dead" (Armes, Davis, Levinson, Scura)	2:36
Total length:		56:21

== Personnel ==
=== Band ===
- Chris Armes – guitar, vocals, art design and illustration
- Eric "E-Rock" Davis – guitar, vocals
- Greg Schneider – bass guitar, vocals (tracks 1–18); story and layout
- Michael "Mikey L" Levinson – drums
- Sean Scura – bass guitar, vocals (tracks 19 and 20)

=== Additional musicians ===
- Shawn Stern of Youth Brigade (band) - backing vocals on "Straight Outta Hell" (original release only)

=== Production ===
- Dan de las Isla – mastering
- Chris Armes and Greg Hewitt – art design and illustration
