= The Red & the Black =

Studio album by Agent 51
- Released: 2003
- Studio: 4th Street Recording
- Genre: Punk rock, rock
- Length: 39:48
- Label: Surfdog
- Producer: Jim Wirt, Gary Hoey

Agent 51 chronology
Just Keep Runnin' (2000)	The Red & the Black (2003)

The Red & the Black is a rock album by the Poway, California band Agent 51, released by Surfdog Records in 2003. It was the band's third album and was named "best punk album" at the 2003 San Diego Music Awards. With it the band distanced themselves from their previous punk rock sound by incorporating much more of an influence of classic rock and heavy metal bands such as AC/DC, Motörhead and Def Leppard. They also distanced themselves from the secret agent mythos they had created for themselves by ceasing to wear matching black suits in concert and by ceasing to write songs dealing with the existence of extraterrestrials and UFOs. The song "Loaded" was originally titled "Fuckin' Loaded" but was changed for printing on the album sleeve. They received airplay on local rock radio station 91X for the song "She's My Heroine." The album was the band's last before their extended hiatus, and they would not reconvene until a reunion show in 2005. Agent 51 have not released any more albums since The Red & the Black.

== Track listing ==
All songs written by Chris Armes.

1. "American Rock N Roll"
2. "Wrecking Ball"
3. "Raised By Wolves"
4. "Loaded"
5. "Kiss of Death"
6. "She's My Heroine"
7. "Aim High"
8. "Kinda Like Murder"
9. "Air Raid"
10. "Hell Bent Whiskey Suicide"
11. "Love With the Devil"
12. "Disappear"
13. "Been So Long"

== Personnel ==
- Chris Armes – guitar, vocals
- Eric "E-Rock" Davis – guitar, vocals
- Sean Scura – bass, vocals
- Michael "Mikey L" Levinson – drums

Production

- Recorded at 4th Street Recording
- Mastered by Tom Baker at Precision Mastering
- Produced, engineered and mixed by Jim Wirt except tracks 7, 11 & 12 produced and engineered by Jim Wirt and Gary Hoey and mixed by Gary Hoey
- Additional production and arrangement by Gary Hoey
- Assistant Engineer: CJ Erickson
- Executive Producer: Dave Kaplan
- Music and lyrics by Agent 51
- Art and layout by Shaddox Design
- Photography by LaGuerra
