= Elva (album) =

Studio album by Unwritten Law
- Released: January 29, 2002
- Recorded: 2001
- Studio: Total Access Recording, Redondo Beach, California
- Genre: Alternative rock; pop rock; pop-punk; power pop
- Length: 50:13
- Label: Interscope
- Producer: John Shanks; Josh Abraham; Miguel; Unwritten Law

Unwritten Law chronology
Unwritten Law (1998)	Elva (2002)	Here's to the Mourning (2005)

Singles from Elva
- 1. "Up All Night" Released: November 9, 2001; 2. "Seein' Red" Released: January 14, 2002

Professional ratings
Review scores
Source	Rating
Allmusic	3/5 stars
Popmatters	Unfavorable
Punknews	link
Rolling Stone	link

Elva is the fourth studio album by the San Diego–based punk rock band Unwritten Law, released on January 29, 2002 by Interscope Records. With it the band moved away from their previously established skate punk style, and towards a more accessible alternative rock sound. The band found success with the song "Seein' Red", which reached No. 1 on the US Modern Rock Tracks charts. This is the band's last studio album to feature founding drummer Wade Youman until their 2022 album, The Hum.

== Production ==
After touring in support of their Self-Titled Album, the band took time off the road and began working on new material. In an interview with MTV, Ex-Guitarist, Rob Brewer had stated:

"It's definitely a little different, I can't really explain how; it's just more of a rock record and there's more material. The album will have more complex instrumentation and a more mature vibe than the group's past work, We're stoked on it, we didn't go into the recording studio thinking we need to write another "Cailin", we believe we have songs that are radio-friendly—we just play what we like and hope everyone else likes it, too".

The band had rented a house in Los Angeles where they could hang out and write songs, though according to Brewer, nothing got done:

We never went to bed while we were in L.A. the whole time, and there were people partying at our house all the time. It was pretty crazy. We had something like a $15,000 bill from trash and damages.

They began recording the new album in the summer of 2000 with producer John Shanks, Brewer further explained:

"We talked with a bunch of other guys who had done much bigger albums," "but they didn't really take the time to listen to the demos and had no solid input on what they liked or didn't like. John was totally different; he really listened to the songs and had some solid ideas.

The band wrote about 30 songs with only 14 making the cut, two songs that didn’t make the album, "Dark Side" and "Baby, Come On" would end up as b-sides on the "Up All Night" single.

The album was finished, but upon listening to what they had, the band decided to scrap the recordings, go back into the studio, and redo the album with new producers Josh Abraham and Michael Happoldt.

In a 2014 interview, Happoldt recalled the sessions:

"Now that was a hybrid because they were on Interscope and there was a lot of pressure and they were used to doing certain things a certain way. So some lines were drawn a little bit there [haha]. But still, I got a lot of soul out of those boys for the condition it was recorded in. You know, huge studios, a lot of pressure from Interscope, but we had a number 1 hit out of that with "Seeing Red".

Elva features guest appearances by Tony Kanal of No Doubt, Josh Freese of The Vandals, and Neville Staple of The Specials. The two "Raleigh Soliloquy" tracks are recordings of the rants of Raleigh Theodore Sakers. Previous recordings of his rants numbered soliloquies I-III had appeared on the Sublime album Robbin' the Hood. After the closing track "Evolution" there is a phone message to singer Scott Russo from Blink-182 singer/guitarist Tom DeLonge, a close friend of the band who had grown up with them in their home town of Poway.

== Track listing ==
All lyrics are written by Scott Russo, except where noted.

No.	Title	Music	Producer	Length
1.	"Mean Girl" (lyrics: Ben Rosen, Russo)	Ben Rosen	John Shanks	3:06
2.	"Up All Night"	Scott Russo	Michael Happoldt, Unwritten Law	3:03
3.	"Sound Siren"	Russo	Shanks	2:50
4.	"How You Feel"	Russo	Happoldt, Unwritten Law	2:45
5.	"Blame It on Me"	Rob Brewer, Russo, Wade Youman	Shanks	2:36
6.	"Seein' Red"	Russo	Happoldt, Unwritten Law	3:47
7.	"Nick and Phil" (no music; spoken word by Nicholas Wright and Phil Jamieson)			0:38
8.	"Hellborn"	Youman, Russo	Shanks	3:19
9.	"Geronimo"	Russo, Steve Morris, Youman, Brewer, Pat Kim	Shanks	3:29
10.	"Rescue Me"	Russo	Happoldt, Unwritten Law	4:01
11.	"Actress, Model..." (lyrics: John Brinton Hogan, Russo)	John Brinton Hogan	Shanks	3:09
12.	"Raleigh (Soliloquy, Pt. V)" (no music; spoken word by Raleigh Theodore Sakers)			0:14
13.	"Babalon"	Russo	Happoldt, Unwritten Law	4:08
14.	"Raleigh (Soliloquy, Pt. VI)" (no music; spoken word by Sakers)			0:42
15.	"Rest of My Life"	Russo	Josh Abraham	2:43
16.	"Elva"	Russo, Nicholas Wright, Phil Jamieson	Happoldt, Unwritten Law	4:08
17.	"Evolution"	Russo, Morris, Youman, Brewer, Kim	Shanks	5:35
Total length:				50:13

== Personnel ==
Unwritten Law

- Scott Russo – lead vocals
- Steve Morris – lead guitar, backing vocals
- Rob Brewer – rhythm guitar, backing vocals
- Pat "PK" Kim – bass guitar
- Wade Youman – drums

Additional musicians

- Nicholas Wright – guitar on "Elva"
- Josh Freese – drums on "Up All Night"
- John Shanks – additional guitar on "Sound Siren," slide guitar on "Actress, Model..."
- Miguel – upbeat guitar on "How You Feel," lead guitar on "Seein' Red"
- Marshall Goodman – percussion on "Up All Night" and "Hellborn"
- Michael Fisher – Indian percussion on "Babalon"
- The Allday Singers – group vocals on "Babalon"
- Tony Kanal – bass guitar on "Rest of My Life"
- Neville Staples – DJ vocal on "Evolution"
- Raleigh Theodore Sakers – spoken vocals on tracks 12 & 14

Artwork

- Steven R. Gilmore – sleeve design, layout, art direction, line drawings (based on original drawings by Wade Youman)
- Wade Youman and Marc B. – art direction
- Mark Baldswin – cover paintings
- Dean Karr – photography

Production

- John Shanks and Miguel – Producers
- Josh Abraham – producer and mixing of "Rest of My Life"
- Mark DeSisto and Tobias Miller – engineers
- Dan Chase, Tal Herzberg, and Baraka – Pro Tools
- Eddie Ashworth – additional engineering
- Mike McMullen and Jerry Moss – assistant engineers
- David J. Holman – mixing
- Mixed at Cactus Studio Hollywood
- Brian Gardner – mastering

== Charts ==
Album

Chart performance for Elva
Chart (2001–2002)	Peak position
Australian Albums (ARIA)	17
US Billboard 200	69

Singles

Chart performance for singles from Elva
Year	Single	Chart	Position
2002	"Seein' Red"	US Modern Rock Tracks	1
2002	"Seein' Red"	Bubbling Under Hot 100 Singles	105
2002	"Seein' Red"	Australian Singles Chart	73
2002	"Up All Night"	US Modern Rock Tracks	14
2002	"Up All Night"	Australian Singles Chart	71
