= Seein' Red (Unwritten Law song) =

Single by Unwritten Law

from the album Elva
- Released: January 14, 2002
- Recorded: 2001
- Studio: Total Access, Redondo Beach, California
- Genre: Alternative rock; post-grunge; pop rock
- Label: Interscope
- Songwriter: Scott Russo
- Producers: Miguel; Unwritten Law

Unwritten Law singles chronology
"Up All Night" (2001)	"Seein' Red" (2002)	"Rest of My Life" (2003)

Music video
- "Seein' Red" on YouTube

"Seein' Red" is a song by the American rock band Unwritten Law, released as the second single on January 14, 2002 from the band's fourth studio album, Elva, which was released on January 29 of that same year. It was written by singer Scott Russo and produced by Michael "Miguel" Happoldt. It became the highest-charting single of the band's career, holding the number one spot on Billboard's Modern Rock Tracks chart for four weeks between May and June 2002. The music video for "Seein' Red" was directed by Marc Webb.

== Track listing ==
No.	Title	Lyrics	Music	Producer	Length
1.	"Seein' Red"	Scott Russo	Russo	Miguel, Unwritten Law	3:47
2.	"Take Me Away"	Russo	Russo	Rick Parashar	4:06
3.	"Mean Girl" (Trickbaby remix)	Ben Rosen, Russo	Rosen	John Shanks	3:25

== Personnel ==
=== Band ===
- Scott Russo – vocals
- Steve Morris – lead guitar
- Rob Brewer - rhythm guitar
- Pat "PK" Kim – bass guitar
- Wade Youman – drums

=== Additional musicians ===
- Miguel – upbeat guitar

=== Production ===
- Miguel – producer
- Mark DeSisto and Tobias Miller – engineers
- Dan Chase, Tal Herzberg, and Baraka – Pro Tools
- Eddie Ashworth – additional engineering
- Mike McMullen and Jerry Moss – assistant engineers
- David J. Holman – mixing – Mixed at Cactus Studio Hollywood
- Brian Garder – mastering

=== Artwork ===
- Dean Karr – photography

== Charts ==
Chart performance for "Seein' Red"
Chart (2002)	Peak position
Australia (ARIA)	73
US Modern Rock (Billboard)	1
