= Oz Factor (album) =

Studio album by Unwritten Law
- Released: April 1996
- Recorded: November–December 1995 at Pyramid Sound, Ithaca, New York
- Genre: Skate punk; melodic hardcore
- Length: 33:57
- Label: Epic
- Producer: Greg Graffin

Unwritten Law chronology
Blue Room (1994)	Oz Factor (1996)	Unwritten Law (1998)

Singles from Oz Factor
- 1. "Lame" Released: 1996; 2. "Denied" Released: 1996; 3. "Superman" Released: 1996

Professional ratings
Review scores
Source	Rating
AllMusic	2/5 stars
The Tampa Tribune	3/4 stars

Oz Factor is the second album and major label debut by American punk rock band Unwritten Law, released in 1996 by Epic Records. The songs "Superman" and "Denied" became minor hits on local rock radio stations.

Unwritten Law supported the album by touring with Bad Religion. It was the band's last album with bassist John Bell, who left the band following the supporting tours.

== Production ==
The band spent about six months writing songs for the album, which was produced by Greg Graffin, of Bad Religion. Brian Baker, also of Bad Religion, appeared on the album as well. The songs "Suzanne" and "Shallow" are re-recordings of songs from the band's debut album, Blue Room.

== Critical reception ==
The Washington Post thought that "only a few tracks (notably 'Shallow' and 'Tell Me Why') bear a strong resemblance to Bad Religion's high-speed folkie-punk, but everything on Oz has been heard somewhere before." The San Diego Union-Tribune determined that the album "gets its mosh-pit kick from Wade Youman's breakneck drums and John Bell's antsy bass and its pop snap from the band's twisted way with a catchy tune." The Tampa Tribune opined that "the title track boasts blistering rhythm work and loose-limbed downshifts a la NOFX."

AllMusic wrote that the album "sounds like a lighter-weight and much lamer version of Green Day's Dookie, having the same power pop take on skatepunk."

== Track listing ==
All tracks are written by Unwritten Law (Scott Russo, Steve Morris, Rob Brewer, John Bell, and Wade Youman).

No.	Title	Length
1.	"Superman"	3:36
2.	"Oz Factor"	2:50
3.	"Suzanne"	2:58
4.	"Denied"	2:24
5.	"Tell Me Why"	2:55
6.	"Rejected"	2:14
7.	"Falling Down"	2:26
8.	"Shallow"	3:11
9.	"Differences"	3:27
10.	"Lame"	2:36
11.	"Stop to Think"	1:19
12.	"The Legend of Johnny and Sarah"	3:50
Total length:		33:57

== Personnel ==
=== Band ===
- Scott Russo – lead vocals
- Steve Morris – lead guitar, backing vocals
- Rob Brewer – rhythm guitar, backing vocals
- John Bell – bass guitar
- Wade Youman – drums

=== Additional musicians ===
- Brian Baker – guitar solo on "Suzanne"

=== Production ===
- Greg Graffin – producer
- Paul DuGre – engineer, mixing
- Rob Hunter – assistant engineer and mixing
- Alex Perialas – additional engineering
- George Marino – mastering

=== Artwork ===
- David Coleman – art direction
- Bagel – cover illustration
- John Dunne – photography
