= Aimee Allen =

American singer-songwriter

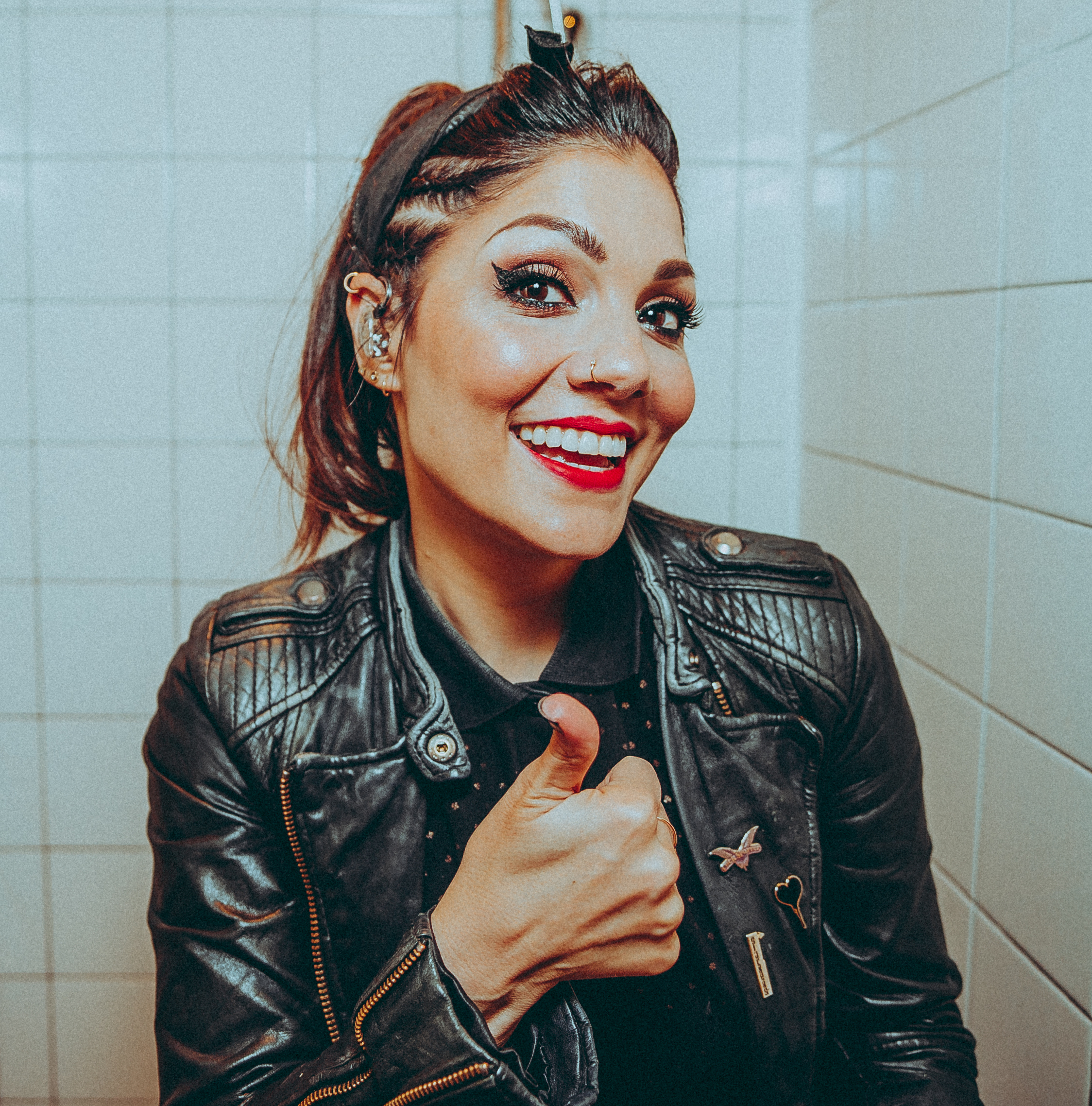
- Aimee Allen in March 2019

Background information
- Also known as: Aimee Interrupter
- Born: February 2, 1979 (age 47); Kalispell, Montana, U.S.
- Genres: Punk rock; ska punk; skate punk; rock; indie pop
- Occupation: Singer-songwriter
- Instrument: Vocals
- Years active: 2002–present
- Labels: Hellcat; Epitaph; Side Tracked; Elektra
- Member of: The Interrupters
- Spouse: Kevin Bivona

Aimee Joan Allen (born February 2, 1979) is an American singer-songwriter based in Los Angeles, California. She is currently the lead vocalist for the ska-punk band the Interrupters under the moniker Aimee Interrupter. As a singer-songwriter, she has collaborated with Mark Ronson, Sublime with Rome, Tim Armstrong of Rancid, Billie Joe Armstrong of Green Day, Linda Perry, Lee "Scratch" Perry, Jimmy Cliff, the Mighty Mighty Bosstones, Travis Barker, Dirty Heads, and Tom Morello.

== Early life ==
Allen was born in Kalispell, Montana. She has said that she had a "rough upbringing", and "ended up in a foster home at a young age and moved from school to school". Growing up, Joan Jett was a big influence and inspiration for Allen.

== Career ==
=== Solo career ===
Allen began singing in bands in Montana and moved to Los Angeles at the age of 18 to pursue a career in music. In Los Angeles, she was lead singer of a punk band with members of No Motiv called Forum. After the band's record deal with MCA fell through, Allen signed a solo deal with Elektra Records in 2002.

Allen was signed to Elektra after producer Randy Jackson saw her band perform live and heard her demo. Her debut album I'd Start a Revolution (If I Could Get Up in the Morning), featuring tracks produced by Mark Ronson and Don Gilmore, was recorded in 2003 but never released due to the label being absorbed by Atlantic Records in 2004. The label did, however, release her first single "Revolution", which was the theme for the WB television series Birds of Prey.

Allen contributed to the songwriting of Unwritten Law's 2005 album Here's to the Mourning, including the single "Save Me (Wake Up Call)", which was co-written and produced by Linda Perry and reached number 5 on the Billboard Alternative Songs chart. A brief romantic relationship between Allen and Unwritten Law lead singer Scott Russo resulted in a side project called Scott & Aimee. Their album Sitting in a Tree was released in 2007 by Side Tracked Records.

In 2007, her song "Stripper Friends" was re-worked and recorded by Kevin Michael featuring Lupe Fiasco as "We All Want the Same Thing". That year, Allen sang the song "Cooties" on the soundtrack to the 2007 film Hairspray.

In 2008, Allen supported presidential hopeful Ron Paul by recording "Ron Paul Revolution Theme Song", and performing at events during the 2008 campaign. She sang backing vocals on Lee "Scratch" Perry’s 2008 album Repentance. Also in 2008, she was co-host of the SuicideGirls radio show on Indie 103.1 FM in Los Angeles.

Allen released her self-produced album, A Little Happiness, on July 21, 2009, on Side Tracked Records with ADA/Warner Brothers. It debuted at No. 27 on the Billboard Heatseekers chart. In support of A Little Happiness, Allen opened for Sugar Ray on their 2009 tour.

In 2011, Allen contributed vocals to the Sublime with Rome debut album Yours Truly, and was featured on the song "Safe and Sound".

Allen was frequently involved with Tim Armstrong's Tim Timebomb and Friends project, which saw the online-release of a song a day for an entire year from 2012 to 2013. She was featured on the songs "Dance Dance Dance", "Let My Love Open The Door", "Safety Pin Stuck In My Heart", "Too Much Pressure", "Concrete Jungle", "Sidekick", and many more. She was also a member of the touring group.

In 2012, she sang background vocals on the Grammy Award winning album Rebirth by Jimmy Cliff.

In 2016, she sang on the song "The War Inside" by Noi!se.

Allen was featured on two songs on the Mad Caddies album Punk Rocksteady, singing on the covers of "Sleep Long", originally by Operation Ivy, and "She's Gone", originally by NOFX.

The Bar Stool Preachers released their album Grazie Governo on August 3, 2018, Allen was featured on the track "Choose My Friends".

In 2019, Aimee Interrupter was featured on the Ratboy song "Night Creature" off his album Internationally Unknown.

On January 25, 2021, the Mighty Mighty Bosstones released a single titled "the Final Parade" which features a guest appearance from Aimee Interrupter, as well members of Rancid, Fishbone, Dance Hall Crashers, Los Skanarles, The Specials, and others.

On June 4, 2021, Tom Morello announced a new collaborative project with The Bloody Beetroots called The Catastrophists EP. The first single, "Radium Girls", featured four women: Aimee Interrupter, Nadya Tolokonnikova of Pussy Riot, Mish Way of White Lung, & Delila Paz of The Last Internationale. The song is about the true story of the Radium Girls, young Illinois factory workers who were the victims of one of the most heinous crimes in US industrial history.

On July 16, 2021, The Dirty Heads released "Rage", a song featuring Aimee Interrupter and produced by Travis Barker of Blink-182. The music video featured graffiti artist RISK.

=== The Interrupters (2009–present) ===
In 2011, Allen formed the ska/punk band the Interrupters with brothers Kevin, Justin, and Jesse Bivona. They met in 2009 on a tour that had Allen, a solo artist at the time, and the Bivona brothers' band, The Telacasters, supporting Dirty Heads and Sugar Ray. Allen and Kevin started writing songs together and brought Kevin's brothers, twins Jesse and Justin, in to play drums and bass leading to the formation of the Interrupters.

The Interrupters' debut self-titled record was released August 5, 2014 on Hellcat/Epitaph Records. The album debuted at No. 95 on the iTunes US Albums chart.

The Interrupters' sophomore record Say It Out Loud was released June 24, 2016 on Hellcat/Epitaph Records. Produced again by Tim Armstrong, the album peaked at No. 7 on the Billboard Heatseekers Album chart, No. 25 on the Billboard Independent albums chart, No. 38 on the Billboard Top Rock Albums chart, No. 22 on the Billboard Vinyl Albums chart, and debuted at No. 56 on the iTunes US Albums chart.

In support of Say It Out Loud, the band performed on the entire Vans Warped Tour during the summer of 2016, embarked on their first US headlining tour, and supported Green Day on the Revolution Radio Tour in Europe, United Kingdom, Australia, New Zealand, and South America.

On May 2, 2018, the Interrupters announced the album Fight the Good Fight, produced by Tim Armstrong, released on June 29 on Hellcat/Epitaph. The lead single, "She's Kerosene", peaked at number 4 on Billboard's Alternative Songs chart, it reached number 1 on the Canadian Rock Music Charts, and was certified gold in Canada. The second single "Gave You Everything" peaked at number 21 on Billboard's Alternative Songs chart and number 2 on the Canadian Rock Music Charts. The album has reached number 2 on the Billboard Independent Albums, and number 141 on the Billboard 200.

On July 26, 2018, the Interrupters made their live television debut on Jimmy Kimmel Live!, performing "She's Kerosene" and "Take Back The Power".

The band was featured on the cover of Kerrang! magazine in May 2019 and was nominated for "Best International Breakthrough" at the 2019 Kerrang! Awards.

On June 18, 2021, the Interrupters released Live In Tokyo!, a live album recorded at the Summer Sonic Festival in 2019.

== Personal life ==
Allen is married to fellow Interrupters band member Kevin Bivona.

== Discography ==
=== Solo albums ===
Title	Album details	US Heat
I'd Start a Revolution If I Could Get Up in the Morning	Released: January 1, 2003; Label: Elektra; Formats: CD, digital download	—
A Little Happiness	Released: July 21, 2009; Label: Side Tracked/Warner; Formats: CD, digital download	27

=== As Scott & Aimee ===
- Sitting in a Tree (2007) – Songwriter, Vocals

=== Solo singles ===
- "Revolution" – I'd Start a Revolution (If I Could Get Up in the Morning) (2003)
- "On Vacation" – A Little Happiness (2009)
- "Calling The Maker – A Little Happiness (2009)

=== Guest appearances ===
- Bleed the Sky – Reveille (2001) – Vocals on "Plastic"
- Here's to the Mourning – Unwritten Law (2005) – Songwriter on "Save Me (Wake Up Call)"
- Repentance – Lee "Scratch" Perry (2008) – Vocals
- Yours Truly – Sublime with Rome (2011) – Vocals on "Safe and Sound" (Deluxe Edition)
- Rebirth – Jimmy Cliff (2012) – Vocals (Grammy Award for Best Reggae Album)
- The Real Enemy – Noi!se (2016) – Vocals on "The War Inside"
- Grazie Governo – The Barstool Preachers (2018) – Vocals on "Choose My Friends"
- Punk Rocksteady – Mad Caddies (2018) – Vocals on "Sleep Long" and "She's Gone"
- Internationally Unknown – Rat Boy (2019) – Vocals on "Night Creature"
- When God Was Great – The Mighty Mighty Bosstones (2021) – Vocals on “The Final Parade”
- "Radium Girls" – Tom Morello (2021) – Featured Vocals
- The Best Of the Dirty Heads – Dirty Heads (2021) – Featured on "Rage"
- Walk Through Fire – Bedouin Soundclash (2022) – Featured on "Walk Through Fire"

=== Soundtracks ===
- Birds of Prey (2002–2003) – Songwriter, Vocals "Revolution" (Theme Song)
- Two for The Money (2005) – Songwriter "Save Me (Wake Up Call)"
- Hairspray (2007) – Vocals on "Cooties"
- Pretty Ugly People (2008) – Songwriter & Vocals on "I'm Here"; Vocals on "Lean Into Me"
- Prom Night (2008) – Songwriter "We All Want The Same Thing"
- Step Up 2: The Streets (2008) – Songwriter "We All Want The Same Thing (Acoustic Version)"
- Sorority Row (2009) – Songwriter & Vocals on "Emergency"
- Lucky (2011) – Vocals on "Crazy"
- Mean Girls 2 (2011) – Vocals on "Days Like This" by Transcenders
- 22 Jump Street (2014) – Songwriter "Live Forever" by Travis Barker featuring Juicy J
- Where To Invade Next (2015) – Singer/Songwriter on "Take Back The Power" by The Interrupters
- The Twilight Zone (2019) – Singer/Songwriter on "Family" by The Interrupters
- The Umbrella Academy (2020) – Vocals on "Bad Guy" by The Interrupters
- Atypical (2021) – Singer/Songwriter on "She's Kerosene" by The Interrupters

== Filmography ==
=== As actress ===
- Undressed (1 episode, 2000)
- The Bold and the Beautiful (as Sam, 4 episodes, 2000)
- This Is My Family (as self/The Interrupters, 2021)
