= Scott Russo =

American singer

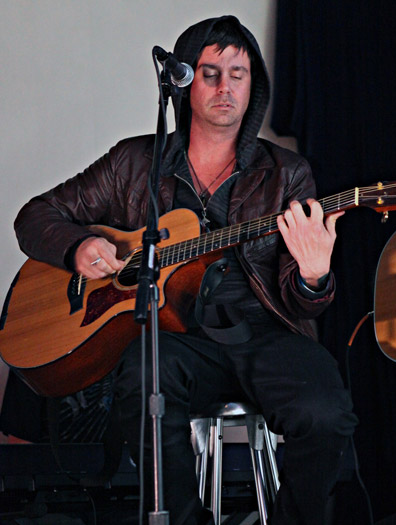
- Russo performing with Unwritten Law in 2011

Background information
- Genres: Punk rock; pop-punk; skate punk; alternative rock
- Occupation: Musician
- Instruments: Vocals; guitar; keyboards
- Years active: 1988–present
- Website: unwrittenlawofficial.com

Scott Russo is an American singer. He is the lead vocalist of the San Diego-based punk rock band Unwritten Law.

== Personal life ==
He was raised in the Rancho Penasquitos suburb of San Diego and is an avid skateboarder and surfer. He is the father of model and singer Cailin Russo, who was the subject of the band's 1998 song "Cailin".

In November 2004, the group was banned from CBGB's New York. Russo was smoking a cigarette on stage in between songs, violating New York smoking laws, his monitors were subsequently turned off. Later on during the show Russo lit up another cigarette, and the lights were turned off. The band continued to play in the dark.

On February 5, 2009, Russo's Rancho Peñasquitos home was lost in a devastating fire. The home and all of the family's personal possessions inside were completely destroyed. Damages were estimated at $500,000, and the property was unfortunately uninsured at the time. Russo later noted that the fire was a "freak accident". The San Diego House of Blues hosted a special benefit concert shortly after the fire to raise relief funds.

In February 2016, Russo underwent surgery for an undisclosed ailment, a development announced by his label, Cyber Tracks.

On March 30, 2023, Russo was arrested by Tampa Police Department for a violation of probation following a performance at the Crowbar. The incident resulted in a bail of $50,000 and the cancellation of the band's Fort Lauderdale show, though the tour continued.
