= Blue Room (Unwritten Law album) =

Studio album by Unwritten Law
- Released: 1994
- Recorded: May–June 1994 at Nestor Studios, El Cajon, California
- Genre: Skate punk
- Length: 33:00
- Label: Red Eye (Original 1994 Release) Epic Records (1995 Reissue)
- Producer: Dave Nestor, Unwritten Law

Unwritten Law chronology
Blue Room (1994)	Oz Factor (1996)

Professional ratings
Review scores
Source	Rating
AllMusic	1.5/5 stars

Blue Room is the debut album by American punk rock band Unwritten Law. It was released in 1994 by Red Eye Records. It was the band's first full-length album and established their presence in the prolific San Diego music scene of the early 1990s. The album attracted the attention of Epic Records, who re-released it a year after its original release.

The album's title is a reference to the single-room apartment that singer Scott Russo lived in during the band's early years and where most of the album was written (the room was painted entirely blue). The song title "C.P.K." stands for "Crazy Poway Kids" and is a reference to the band's hometown of Poway, California (a suburb of San Diego). "Blurred (Part 2)" is a reference to a song on the band's debut EP Blurr. The songs "Shallow" and "Suzanne" would be re-recorded for their second album Oz Factor.

== Track listing ==
All tracks are written by Unwritten Law (Scott Russo, Steve Morris, Rob Brewer, John Bell, and Wade Youman).

No.	Title	Length
1.	"C.P.K."	2:40
2.	"Shallow"	3:13
3.	"What About Me"	2:26
4.	"Suzanne"	2:22
5.	"Obsession"	1:47
6.	"Tribute"	2:26
7.	"Lessons"	2:01
8.	"Superficial Society"	1:52
9.	"Kill to Breathe"	4:38
10.	"Switch"	1:56
11.	"World War III"	1:56
12.	"Blurred (Part 2)"	5:33
Total length:		33:00

== Personnel ==
Unwritten Law

- Scott Russo – vocals
- Steve Morris – guitar
- Rob Brewer – guitar
- John Bell – bass guitar
- Wade Youman – drums

Production

- Dave Nestor – producer, engineer
- Mike Monroe – executive producer
- John Golden – mastering

Artwork

- Greg Raymond – graphic design
- Bagel – cover art - Nathan Bagel Stapley
- Mike Krull – disc art
- Wade Youman – other artwork
- Ben Davis – photography
