= Black Pegasus =

American rapper

- Also known as: Black-P; The Black Mexican; Yo Mamma's Pimp
- Born: Robert Houston II; March 24, 1980 (age 46); Germany
- Origin: Colorado Springs, Colorado, U.S.
- Genres: Hip hop
- Occupation: Rapper
- Years active: 2001-present
- Label: Brass Knuckle Entertainment

Robert Houston II, also known as Black Pegasus or simply Black-P, is an American rapper/South Western hip hop artist. He is the current president and CEO of Brass Knuckle Entertainment.

== Biography ==
Robert Houston II was born on March 24, 1980 in Germany where his father was stationed with the US Air Force, and lived in Arizona, Florida, and New Mexico before his family settled on the Southeast side of Colorado Springs when he was age ten. He is from the Woodside Townhomes section in Colorado Springs. He is of mixed African-American and Mexican descent, hence the title of his fourth album, The Black Mexican. He open enrolled for high school and attended Widefield and Mitchell High School, and began rapping when he was sixteen, soon performing and working in his early days under the name Yo Mamma's Pimp. He worked with the group Fusion of Syllables (F.O.S.) for two years before going solo in 2001. Black-P has released five studio albums (Black Pegasus, Knuckle Up, F**K YO RADIO, The Black Mexican, and Black By Popular Demand), two mixtapes (Black P The Mixtape, and Shitting On the Industry Vol.1), and one collaboration CD (Banana Spitz) with Liquid Assassin of the hip-hop group Grave Plott. His album Brass Knuckle King was released in 2011, and featured guest appearances by Immortal Technique, Liquid Assassin, and Kutt Calhoun. Black P is also currently working on a collaboration album entitled "The Council", which will consist of Black P, King Tef, Hypnautic, and Johnny Rocketz. Black P's seventh studio album, "Yo Mamma's Pimp" (aka YMP), was released in 2013.

Black-P has competed in several battle-rapping contests, winning the Rock the Mic Battle in 2003 and taking second place in Scribble Jam in Cincinnati. He has featured on the MTV shows Road Rules and The Real World and in the NBA Jam 2 video game.

== Discography ==
=== Studio albums ===
- Black Pegasus (2003)
- Knuckle Up (2005)
- F**K YO RADIO (2006)
- The Black Mexican (2008)
- Black By Popular Demand (2010)
- Brass Knuckle King (2011)
- Yo Mamma's Pimp (aka YMP) (2013)
- Flobama (2015)
- Robert Houston ll (2017)

=== Mixtapes ===
- Black P The Mixtape (2004)
- Shitting On the Industry Vol.1 (2009)

=== Collaborations ===
- Black Pegasus Presents: Banana Spitz (2009)
- The Council (2012)

=== Music videos ===
Title	Album
"I Got Next"	Knuckle Up
"Yeah Baby"	Knuckle Up
"Who Ya Gonna Call?"	Knuckle Up
"Bow Your Head"	Knuckle Up
"Keep On Movin'"	Knuckle Up
"So Glad"	F**K YO RADIO!
"Keep It Up, Don't Stop"	The Black Mexican
"Rep That"	The Black Mexican
"Step Into the Ring"	The Black Mexican
"Drop It 4 Me"	Shitting On the Industry Vol.1
"Over & Over"	Black By Popular Demand
"Heaven Kiss"	Black By Popular Demand
"Time Lost"	Brass Knuckle King
"Brass Knuckle King"	Brass Knuckle King
"Snicker Licker"	Brass Knuckle King
"Spank That"	Brass Knuckle King
"We Gone Make It"	Brass Knuckle King
"Notorious B.P."	Brass Knuckle King
"Problem Going Back"	Brass Knuckle King
"So Colorado"	The Council
"All That"	The Council
"What They Talkin' Bout"	The Council
"Sorry I F**ked Your Girl"	The Council
"Not A Game"	The Council
"Stack"	Yo Mamma's Pimp
