= Tony Palermo =

American drummer

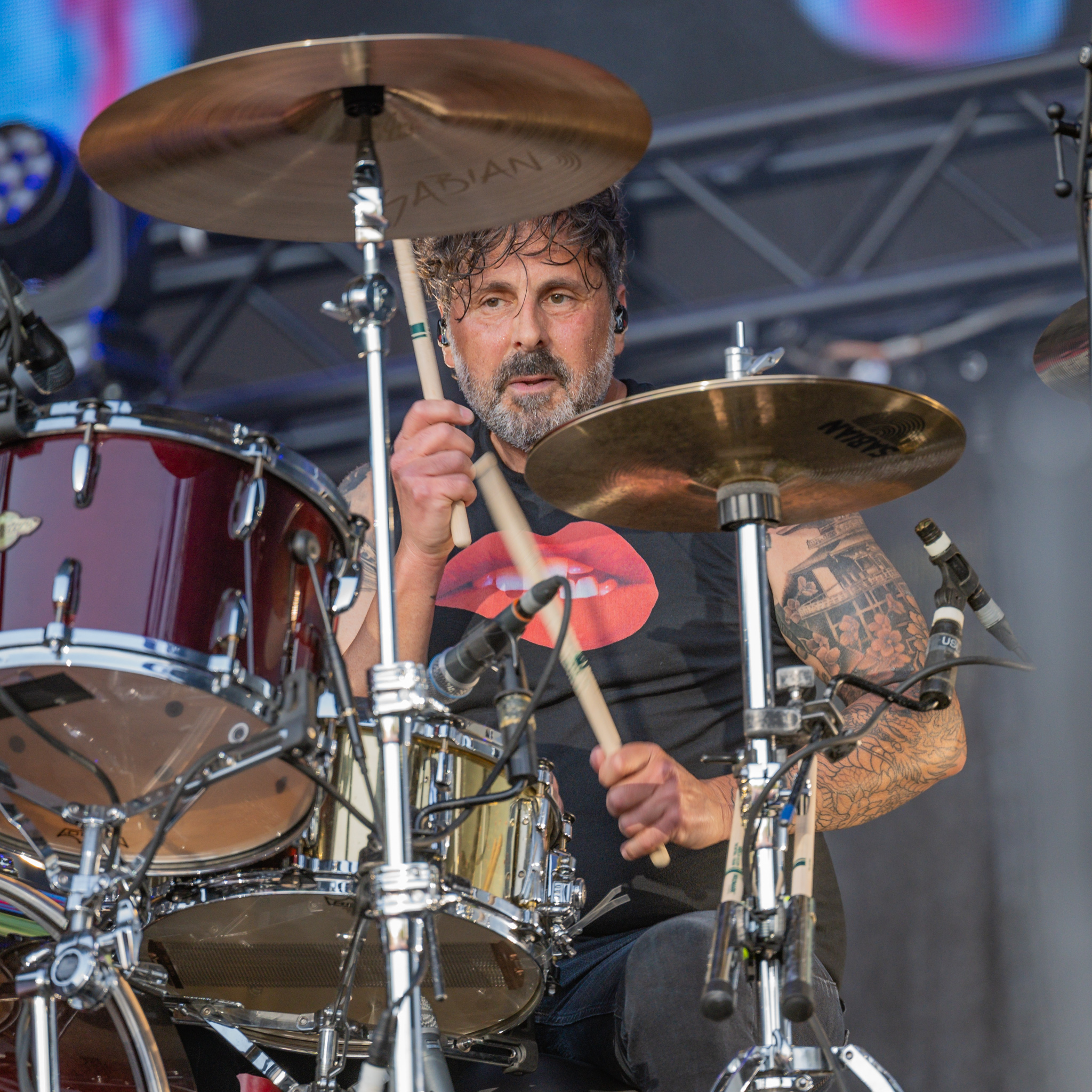
- Palermo performing with Papa Roach in 2023

Background information
- Born: December 12, 1973 (age 52); Salinas, California, U.S.
- Genres: Hard rock; punk rock; alternative rock; nu metal
- Occupations: Musician; drummer
- Instruments: Drums; percussion; bass-guitar
- Years active: 1995–present
- Member of: Papa Roach
- Formerly of: Ten Foot Pole; Sixx:A.M.; Pulley; Unwritten Law
- Website: paparoach.com

Anthony Joseph Palermo (born December 12, 1973) is an American musician who is the drummer of Californian rock band Papa Roach and is the former drummer of punk rock bands Pulley and Unwritten Law. He was also a touring drummer for Sixx:A.M. in summer 2008.

== Musical career ==
=== Ten Foot Pole ===
Tony Palermo began his career as the drummer for the Los Angeles punk band Ten Foot Pole.

=== The Jealous Sound ===
Played on "Kill Them With Kindness", as well as a few tracks on their EP.

=== Unwritten Law ===
Tony Palermo was the drummer for Unwritten Law, with which he was featured on the albums, Here's to the Mourning, and The Hit List. While in Unwritten Law, he was asked to be a touring drummer for Papa Roach before becoming a full-time member.

=== Pulley ===
Palermo became the drummer for punk rock band Pulley after the departure of Jordan Burns. He has since been replaced.

=== Current bands ===
When Papa Roach drummer Dave Buckner was sent to rehab in 2007, the band asked Tony Palermo if he would be willing to play drums for the band live. During the tour, the band formed a relationship with Palermo. In January 2008, when Dave left the band for good, Papa Roach asked Tony to be the band's permanent drummer. It was the band's first line-up change since 1996, also the first since signing with a major label. Tony is featured on six of Papa Roach's albums; Metamorphosis, Time for Annihilation, The Connection, F.E.A.R., Crooked Teeth and Who Do You Trust?. In combination as member from Papa Roach, Tony was also a touring drummer for Sixx:A.M. while the band was on the Crüe Fest tour along with Papa Roach.

== Equipment ==
Drums (Pearl Masterworks in Black Sparkle 6 ply Maple shells)

- 26x16 kick drum (x2)
- 14x9 rack tom
- 16x14 floor tom
- 18x14 floor tom
- 14x6.5 Ultracast snare

Cymbals (Sabian AAX and Paragon)

Paiste cymbals (late 1990s-2011)

- 2002 18" novo china
- 2002 14" heavy hi-hats
- Signature 19" power crash
- Signature 20" power crash
- 2002 22" power ride
- Signature 20" power crash
- 2002 22" crash
- Signature reflector 20" heavy full crash
- Signature reflector 22" heavy full crash
