= Here's to the Mourning =

Studio album by Unwritten Law
- Released: February 1, 2005
- Recorded: 2004 at Ocean Recording, Glenwood Place, and Royaltone in Burbank, The Blue Room in Laurel Canyon, Pulse in Hollywood, and Sound Wherehouse in Sherman Oaks
- Genre: Punk rock
- Length: 46:15
- Label: Lava
- Producers: Josh Abraham; Sean Beavan; Linda Perry

Unwritten Law chronology
Music in High Places (2003)	Here's to the Mourning (2005)	The Hit List (2007)

Singles from Here's to the Mourning
- 1. "Save Me (Wake Up Call)" Released: May 2, 2005; 2. "She Says" Released: September 2005

Professional ratings
Review scores
Source	Rating
Allmusic	2.5/5 stars
Rolling Stone	2/5 stars

Here's to the Mourning is the fifth studio album by American rock band Unwritten Law, released in 2005 by Lava Records. Much of the lyrics on the album were co-written by singer/songwriter Aimee Allen. She and singer Scott Russo soon began a romantic relationship and formed the side project Scott & Aimee. Allen and Linda Perry contributed to the writing of the album's lead single "Save Me (Wake Up Call)," which reached #5 on US modern rock charts. Overall the album reached #51 on the Billboard 200, becoming the highest-ranking album of the band's career. Songs featured in racing games include “Celebration Song”, which is featured on MX vs. ATV Unleashed and Need for Speed: Underground 2. and "F.I.G.H.T" which is featured on Burnout Revenge and Midnight Club 3: Dub Edition.

== Production ==
The band spent about eight months recording the album. When they began to record the album they were without a drummer (founding drummer Wade Youman had been expelled from the band). They were joined in the studio by Adrian Young of No Doubt and Tony Palermo of Pulley who filled in on drums for the recording, as singer Scott Russo stated in a 2005 interview: "They can both play drums really well, on top of their drumming skills, they brought really good energy to the record".

The band got along so well with Palermo that by the time of the album's release he had joined as their permanent drummer.

In a February 2005 interview on Super Request, Russo mentioned that the band started recording the album with producer Josh Abraham, but they felt that the songs were sounding dated, like their previous works, Abraham was fired after a few songs, according to Russo, they wanted the album to sound like a modern day version of Closer, the band tried to get Trent Reznor to produce, but he wasn’t available, so they ended up getting Sean Beavan, who had worked with Nine Inch Nails, Marilyn Manson, and No Doubt.

The album was also the band's last one with rhythm guitarist Rob Brewer, who was ejected from the group in March 2005.

In a 2011 interview, former guitarist Steve Morris had recalled working on the album:

"Here's To The Mourning was written when the band had a lot of interpersonal turmoil going on. None of (us) were really friends let alone a functioning professional band. We fired our original drummer during the writing process do to his personal issues with drugs and other things. And we could barely get into the studio with each other".

== Track listing ==
All lyrics are written by Scott Russo and Aimee Allen.

No.	Title	Music	Drummer	Length
1.	"Intro"	Russo	Tony Palermo	0:50
2.	"Get Up"	Russo, Steve Morris	Palermo	4:11
3.	"Celebration Song"	Russo, Rob Brewer	Adrian Young	3:41
4.	"Because of You"	Russo, Phil Jamieson, Nicholas Wright	Young	3:03
5.	"Lost Control"	Morris	Palermo	2:53
6.	"Save Me (Wake Up Call)"	Russo, Linda Perry, Allen	Palermo	3:31
7.	"I Like the Way" (additional lyrics by Jamieson)	Russo	Palermo	2:58
8.	"Slow Dance"	Russo, Pat Kim	Palermo	3:11
9.	"She Says"	Russo, Jamieson	Palermo	3:59
10.	"Rejection's Cold"	Kim	Young	4:01
11.	"F.I.G.H.T."	Russo	Young	2:48
12.	"Walrus" "Machine" (hidden track)	Russo; Kim	Young	11:09
Total length:				46:15

== Personnel ==
=== Band ===
- Scott Russo – lead vocals
- Steve Morris – lead guitar, backing vocals
- Rob Brewer – rhythm guitar, backing vocals
- Pat "PK" Kim – bass guitar
- Tony Palermo – drums

=== Additional musicians ===
- Adrian Young – drums
- John Krovoza – cello on "Walrus"
- Tom Vos – violin on "Walrus"
- Ben Rosen – programming

=== Production ===
- Sean Beavan – producer, engineer, mixing
- Josh Abraham – producer of "Celebration Song" and "Because of You" (with Beavan)
- Linda Perry – producer of "Save Me (Wake Up Call)" (with Beavan)
- Critter and Zach Barnhorst – engineers
- Zach Barnhorst, Jay Groin, James Murray, and Alex Pavlides – assistant engineers
- Brian Gardner – mastering
- John Michael Gill – cover artist, graphics

== Charts ==
Album

Chart performance for Here's to the Mourning
Chart (2005)	Peak position
Australian Albums (ARIA)	27
US Billboard 200	51

Singles

Chart performance for singles from Here's to the Mourning
Year	Single	Chart	Position
2005	"Save Me (Wake Up Call)"	US Modern Rock Tracks	5
2005	"She Says"	US Modern Rock Tracks	32
