= Unwritten Law (album) =

Studio album by Unwritten Law
- Released: June 2, 1998
- Recorded: July–August 1997 at London Bridge Studios, Seattle; September 1997 at Studio West, San Diego
- Genre: Punk rock
- Length: 44:37
- Label: Interscope
- Producer: Rick Parashar

Unwritten Law chronology
Oz Factor (1996)	Unwritten Law (1998)	Elva (2002)

Singles from Unwritten Law
- 1. "California Sky" Released: 1998; 2. "Holiday" Released: 1998; 3. "Cailin" Released: 1999; 4. "Lonesome" Released: 2000

Professional ratings
Review scores
Source	Rating
Allmusic	4/5 stars

Unwritten Law is the third album by the San Diego–based punk rock band Unwritten Law, released in 1998 by Interscope Records.

It was their first album to chart, reaching No. 16 on Billboard's Top Heatseekers chart. Music videos were filmed for the songs "Teenage Suicide", "California Sky", "Holiday", "Cailin", and "Lonesome". "Cailin" and "Lonesome" were released as singles, the former being Unwritten Law's first song to chart, reaching No. 28 on the Modern Rock Tracks chart.

== Production ==
In June 1997, bassist John Bell had left Unwritten Law, just as the band was preparing to go to Seattle to record their next album, Pivit bassist Micah Alboa was then recruited to fill in on bass.

The band had arrived a few weeks early before recording was to begin at London Bridge Studio, which allowed them time to rehearse and tighten up the songs, as guitarist Rob Brewer had stated:

It was really cool to be up there because we didn’t have any of the distractions of home. Once we got there it rained constantly, so all we did was practice 14 hours a day.

During that time, the band had formed a strong relationship with producer Rick Parashar, who was very enthusiastic about working with the band, as Brewer recalled:

It was the right vibe, the right feeling. We know the guy is very credible, we’ve listened to his records and they all sounded really good.

Brandon Boyd and Mike Einziger of Incubus made a guest appearance on the hidden track "418". An outtake from these sessions, "Take Me Away" later appeared as a b-side on the Seein' Red single.

Following the recording sessions, Pat "PK" Kim of Sprung Monkey joined Unwritten Law as their new permanent bass player.

While the band was in the studio, they were dropped by Epic, and were signed by Interscope Records after Tom Whalley heard the album, as the band recalled:

When we were in Seattle making the record, Epic Records decided to drop us while we were in the studio. They never even heard the new record. After that, we didn't know if we wanted to go back to an independent label or just try to find another major. Interscope Records came in right away and genuinely showed a love for the record. It made sense to go with them.

== Track listing ==
All lyrics are written by Scott Russo except where noted; all music is composed by Unwritten Law (Scott Russo, Steve Morris, Rob Brewer, and Wade Youman).

No.	Title	Length
1.	"Harmonic" (Russo, Brewer)	3:42
2.	"Teenage Suicide"	2:50
3.	"Sorry"	2:58
4.	"California Sky" (Russo, Youman)	3:00
5.	"Cailin"	3:56
6.	"Lonesome"	3:24
7.	"Coffin Text"	2:59
8.	"Holiday"	2:56
9.	"Underground" (Russo, Youman, Brewer)	3:10
10.	"Close Your Eyes"	2:41
11.	"Before I Go" (Russo, Youman, Morris)	4:25
12.	"Genocide" "418" (Russo, Brandon Boyd; hidden track)	9:11
Total length:		44:37

== Appearances in Media ==
- "Harmonic" appeared on the 1998 skate/snowboard film, Decade.
- "Teenage Suicide" appeared in the 1998 thriller film Dead Man's Curve, and the 1998 surf film, The Show.
- "Cailin" appeared in the 1999 horror comedy film, Idle Hands, and the 2000 comedy-drama film, Coyote Ugly.
- "California Sky" appeared on the 2001 PlayStation video game, T.J. Lavin's Ultimate BMX.

== Personnel ==
=== Unwritten Law ===
- Scott Russo – lead vocals
- Steve Morris – lead guitar, backing vocals
- Rob Brewer – rhythm guitar, backing vocals
- Pat "PK" Kim - bass
- Wade Youman – drums, percussion

=== Additional musicians ===
- Micah Albao – bass guitar
- Rick Parashar – piano, keyboards, tambura, percussion
- Geoff Turner – DJ
- Erik Aho – additional guitar on "Cailin"
- Brandon Boyd – spoken vocals and didgeridoo on "418"
- Mike Einziger – additional guitar on "418"
- Craig Yarnold – additional backing vocals on "Holiday"

=== Production ===
- Rick Parashar – producer, engineer, mixing
- Andy Wallace – mixing of "Sorry"
- Jon Plum – assistant producer, engineer, and mixing
- Geoff Ott – second engineer
- Kelly Gray – additional mixing on "Underground" and "418"
- Jon Mathias – engineer of "Holiday"
- George Marino – mastering

=== Artwork ===
- Lorna Turner – graphic design
- Craig Tomkinson and Dave Morris – photography

== Charts ==
Chart performance for Unwritten Law
Chart (2000)	Peak position
Australian Albums (ARIA)	62
