= Unwritten Law =

American punk rock band

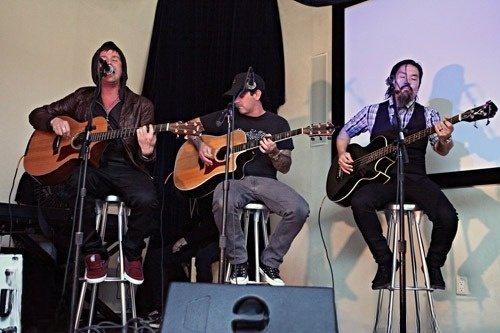
- Unwritten Law performing in 2011

Background information
- Origin: Poway, California, United States
- Genres: Punk rock; pop-punk; skate punk; melodic hardcore; alternative rock
- Years active: 1990–present
- Labels: Red Eye; Epic; Interscope; Lava; Abydos; Suburban Noize; Cyber Tracks; Cleopatra
- Members: Scott Russo; Jonny Grill; Chris Lewis; Scotty Mac; Wade Youman
- Past members: Eric Barth; Jeff Brehm; John Bell; Rob Brewer; Tony Palermo; Steve Morris; Pat "PK" Kim; Dylan Howard; Kevin Besignano; Derik Envy; Ace Von Johnson
- Website: unwrittenlawofficial.com
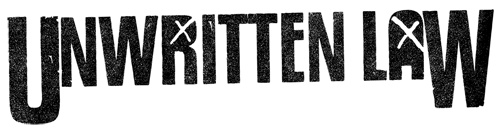

Unwritten Law is an American punk rock band formed in 1990 in Poway, California by drummer Wade Youman. The band has undergone multiple line-up changes, with Youman the sole remaining original member – however, he has left the group twice in its three-decade history. They are best known for their singles "Seein' Red" and "Save Me (Wake Up Call)," both of which peaked in the top 5 in the US Modern Rock charts and the former topping it. The band have also toured extensively both nationally and internationally, most notably as part of the Warped Tour. The band has released seven full-length studio albums to date; their most recent, The Hum, was released in 2022.

== History ==
=== Formation and early years (1990–1994) ===
Unwritten Law was formed in Poway, California by Wade Youman back in the mid-1980s when he was twelve years old. The band's first lineup was Youman on drums, Chris Mussey on vocals, Matt Rathje on guitar, and Craig Winters on bass, Youman described the early incarnations of the group as "kind of Punk, Clashy, and Bauhausy", A number of players came and went throughout the early years, by 1992 the lineup coalesced to include Youman, Rob Brewer on rhythm guitar, Jeff Brehm on bass, and vocalist Scott Russo, who joined the band after doing an impromptu performance of Fugazi's Waiting Room at a house party. They released their first cassette demo on September 9, 1992, known as Six Song Demo. The lineup changed when Brehm left and was replaced by John Bell, with this lineup the band recorded and released the 7" vinyl single Blurr in 1993, which was released by local label Red Eye Records, Steve Morris was then recruited on lead guitar, Unwritten Law quickly established themselves in the prolific San Diego music scene of the early 1990s that also included groups such as Blink-182, Agent 51, Buck-O-Nine, Sprung Monkey, One by One, Drive Like Jehu, and Rocket from the Crypt.

In 1994 the band recorded their first album, Blue Room, which established their early sound of fast-paced punk rock and gave them the opportunity to build their reputation by playing local shows in and around the San Diego area. Songs such as "CPK", "Shallow", and "Suzanne" would become favorites with local fans and would remain in their live set for years to come.

=== Major label signing, Oz Factor (1995–1996) ===
Blue Room attracted the attention of major labels, the band, having distribution problems, left Red Eye Records and signed a recording contract with Epic Records. Their second album, Oz Factor was released in 1996. The songs "Denied" and "Superman" received airplay on several southern California rock radio stations and were released as singles. Over the next year the band toured the United States with bands such as Blink-182 and Pennywise.

=== Interscope Records, self-titled album (1997–1999) ===
By the summer of 1997 bassist John Bell had left the band. Pivit bassist Micah Albao joined them in Seattle for the recording of their next album. Pat "PK" Kim, formerly of Sprung Monkey, would join as their new permanent bass player.

While the band was in the studio, they were dropped by Epic, and had signed to Interscope Records after Tom Whalley heard the recordings their third album, Unwritten Law would be released in June 1998. The singles "Lonesome", "Cailin", and "Teenage Suicide" became minor hits on rock radio stations. and the band embarked on the Vans Warped Tour, which took them across North America, Europe, and Australia. In Australia the band developed an enthusiastic and dedicated following, and they would return there over the next few years and release several singles and live recordings exclusive to the country.

=== Elva, Music in High Places (2000–2003) ===
The band spent a considerable amount of time recording and preparing their next release, 2002's Elva. The album was a stylistic change of pace, deliberately moving away from their established punk rock formula and towards a more accessible hard rock sound. The lead single "Up All Night" became somewhat popular, but it was "Seein' Red" and its accompanying music video which brought the band their greatest success, reaching No. 1 on US modern rock charts. They toured extensively in support of the album alongside bands such as Sum 41 and The Used.

In 2003 the band was invited by VH1 to film an episode of the live acoustic series Music in High Places. The invitation happened somewhat by accident, as the station was hoping to attract Jimmy Eat World but contacted Unwritten Law's management by mistake. The band recorded a set of acoustic performances in various locales at Yellowstone National Park. They prepared the recordings for release as an album, but Interscope declined to release it. The band ended their contract with Interscope and signed to Lava Records, who released Music in High Places as an album. The performance was also released as a DVD entitled Live in Yellowstone. The song "Rest of My Life" from this performance received airplay on modern rock radio stations nationwide.

=== Here's to the Mourning (2004–2005) ===
In March 2004, it was announced that Youman was ejected from the band due to personal and professional issues, Youman released a statement through his website addressing his departure from the band, In a 2014 interview with DyingScene, Youman would call the split devastating:

We were just really hateful towards each other. At that time, me and Scott couldn’t even look at each other because we hated each other so much. It was the same way with Rob at the time. But the label pretty much came in and said “look, you guys have to pick one of these members or the fucking record deal is done

Me and Scott just couldn't see these things out. We couldn't even look at each other. So the band decided to let me go.

Youman would go on to play in various groups, including The Rattlesnake Aces, Demasiado, Underminded, and Black President.

Brooks Wackerman of Bad Religion and Tony Palermo of Pulley would fill in on drums for several shows.

For the recording of their next album Here's to the Mourning, Palermo and Adrian Young of No Doubt would join the band in the studio. The band got along so well with Palermo that by the time of the album's release in 2005 he had joined as their permanent drummer. Much of the lyrics on the album were co-written by singer Scott Russo's girlfriend Aimee Allen, with whom he formed the side project Scott & Aimee. Allen and Linda Perry contributed to the writing of the album's lead single "Save Me (Wake Up Call)", which reached No. 5 on US modern rock charts. This was followed by the single "She Says". The band's song Celebration Song was featured in the soundtracks of Need For Speed: Underground 2 and MX vs. ATV Unleashed.

In November 2004, the group was banned from CBGB's New York. Russo was smoking a cigarette on stage in between songs, violating New York smoking laws, his monitors were subsequently turned off. Later on during the show Russo lit up another cigarette, and the lights were turned off. The band continued to play in the dark.

In March 2005, Brewer was fired from the band after a physical altercation on stage with Russo during a performance at the House of Blues in Anaheim, California. Describing Brewer as irreplaceable, Russo and the other band members chose not to replace him and continued on as a 4-piece. They continued to tour in support of Here's to the Mourning across the United States as well as internationally.

=== Best-of compilation, Live and Lawless and Swan (2006–2012) ===
Unwritten Law spent much of 2006 recording a "best of" album titled The Hit List, which was released on January 2, 2007 by Abydos Records. It includes 17 of the band's most popular songs, most of which were re-recorded by the current lineup, as well as 2 new songs including lead single "Shoulda Known Better". Interscope also released a "best of" compilation entitled 20th Century Masters: The Millennium Collection, which includes songs from the albums Unwritten Law and Elva. On January 3, 2007, the band performed "Shoulda Known Better" on The Tonight Show with Jay Leno. That July the band embarked on a North American tour in support of The Hit List, with Scott & Aimee drummer Dylan Howard filling in for roughly half the tour while Palermo stayed home with his wife, who was due to give birth.

Also during 2007, Palermo acted as fill-in touring drummer for Papa Roach. In March 2008 it was announced that Palermo had joined Papa Roach permanently. Meanwhile, Unwritten Law, with new drummer Dylan Howard, filmed a live DVD at the Key Club in Hollywood, California in March 2008. The album, titled Live and Lawless, was released September 30, 2008 through Suburban Noize Records. Unwritten Law's sixth studio album, Swan, was also released through Suburban Noize on March 29, 2011. On January 24, 2011, Unwritten Law posted on their Myspace page the first single from their new album called "Starships and Apocalypse". They had also been confirmed to play the 2011 Warped Tour.

Guitarist Steve Morris and bassist Pat Kim left Unwritten Law at the end of their Swan Tour in 2011 due to a physical altercation between Scott Russo and Morris. This was kept silent for a few months until after the band finished touring with Warped Tour, although Morris and Kim did not tour with them. Derik Envy, formerly of Red Light Sky, and Kevin Besignano, formerly of Bullets and Octane, had become the permanent replacements for Kim and Morris, respectively.

On August 6, 2011, Youman got invited on stage to play C.P.K. at the Yost Theater in Santa Ana, California., Youman would join the band onstage again in June 2012 to play Harmonic.

=== Lineup changes, Acoustic (2013–2021) ===
In 2013, Youman returned to Unwritten Law after reconciling with Russo. Following Youman's return, Derik Envy and Kevin Besignano both left the band, being replaced with Jonny Grill (Russo's younger brother) and Ace Von Johnson, respectively, Johnson would later be replaced by former Pivit and Fenix TX guitarist Chris Lewis.

While performing at the Hits and Pits festival in Perth, Western Australia on May 18, 2014, the venue cut the power during Up All Night, the band carried on with only drums and the crowd singing along. Russo and Youman would subsequently destroy a hired DW Collector's Series drum kit owned by Mark Eggers of The Casualties. Russo later commented that they weren’t informed about the midnight curfew, further explaining that the promoter didn’t pay any of the bands for that tour.

The band left Suburban Noize, and would release a compilation album called Acoustic on Cyber Track Records on April 1, 2016.

On June 19, 2019, drummer Wade Youman posted on Facebook that he had left the band again and was replaced on drums for four shows by RJ Shankle and then on January 27, 2020 Behind Crimson Eyes drummer Dan Kerby posted on Instagram that he would be filling in on drums for shows in Australia. Youman returned to the band for a third time in 2021.

=== The Hum (2022) ===
On April 29, 2022, the band played their first full performance in two years at Soma San Diego, during their set they were joined on stage by various artists, including members of P.O.D., Buck-O-Nine, Spray Allen, as well as singer Mickey Avalon, and original guitar players Rob Brewer and Steve Morris.

The band released their seventh album, The Hum on July 29, 2022, through Cleopatra Records. It was their first album of new material in 11 years and their first studio album to feature Youman in 20 years.

== Musical style ==
Unwritten Law are characterized as melodic hardcore, punk rock and pop-punk. They have also been described as "punk-revival". Consequence described their sound as "not as splashy as most pop-punk acts". AllMusic said their sound was "rooted in classic punk and melodic hardcore". The band's lyrics are considered to be angsty. Themes explored in their songs include summer.

== Band members ==
Current members

- Wade Youman – drums (1990–2004, 2013–2019, 2021–present)
- Scott Russo – lead vocals, (1990–present), rhythm guitar (2005–present)
- Jonny Grill – bass, backing vocals (2013–present)
- Chris Lewis – lead guitar, backing vocals (2014–present)
- Scotty Mac – rhythm guitar, backing vocals (2017–present)

Former members

- Chris Mussey – lead vocals (1990)
- Matt Rathje – guitar (1990)
- Craig Winters – bass (1990)
- Jeff Brehm – bass (1990–1992)
- John Bell – bass (1992–1997)
- Rob Brewer – rhythm guitar, backing vocals (1990–2005)
- Steve Morris – lead guitar, backing vocals (1990–2011)
- Pat "PK" Kim – bass, backing vocals (1997–2011)
- Tony Palermo – drums (2004–2008)
- Dylan Howard – drums (2008–2013; touring musician 2007, 2016)
- Kevin Besignano – lead guitar, backing vocals (2011–2013)
- Derik Envy – bass, backing vocals (2011–2013)
- Ace Von Johnson – lead guitar, backing vocals (2013–2014)

Former touring musicians

- Ed Murphy – drums (2011)
- Michael Land – drums (2011–2013)
- RJ Shankle – drums (2019, 2020–2021)
- Dan Kerby – drums (2020)

== Discography ==
Studio albums

- Blue Room (1994)
- Oz Factor (1996)
- Unwritten Law (1998)
- Elva (2002)
- Here's to the Mourning (2005)
- Swan (2011)
- The Hum (2022)
