= Rest of My Life (Unwritten Law song) =

Song by Unwritten Law

from the album Elva and Music in High Places
- Released: January 21, 2003
- Recorded: August 2002 in Yellowstone National Park
- Genre: Emo
- Length: 2:32
- Label: Interscope; Earth Escapes
- Songwriter: Scott Russo
- Producers: Unwritten Law; Anthony Eaton

"Rest of My Life" is a song by the San Diego–based rock band Unwritten Law. It originally appeared on their 2001 album Elva, but this version was not released as a single and did not chart. An alternate recording from their 2003 live acoustic album Music in High Places did chart, reaching No. 16 on Billboard's Modern Rock Tracks chart.

== Personnel ==
=== Band ===
- Scott Russo – lead vocals
- Steve Morris – lead guitar, backing vocals
- Rob Brewer – rhythm guitar, backing vocals
- Pat "PK" Kim – bass guitar
- Wade Youman – drums

=== Production ===
- Don Worsham and Wil Burston – recording engineers
- John Alagia and Jeff Juliano – mixing
- Peter Harding – additional engineering and editing
- Baraka – Pro Tools
