= Cailin (song) =

1998 song by Unwritten Law

Song by Unwritten Law

from the album Unwritten Law
- Released: 1998
- Recorded: July–August 1997
- Studio: London Bridge Studios, Seattle
- Length: 3:56
- Label: Interscope
- Songwriters: Scott Russo; Steve Morris; Rob Brewer; Wade Youman
- Producer: Rick Parashar

Music video
- "Cailin" on YouTube

"Cailin" is a song by the San Diego–based rock band Unwritten Law from their 1998 album Unwritten Law. Though it was not released as a single, it became the band's first song to chart, reaching number 28 on Billboard's Modern Rock Tracks chart.

== Background ==
The song is named after singer Scott Russo's daughter, Cailin Russo, about whom he penned the lyrics.

According to ex-guitarist Rob Brewer, the song was almost not released to radio, as the label was not interested in promoting another single from the album, after three previous ones failed to chart. In an interview with MTV, Brewer explained:

"We were kind of expecting the worst. They said, 'We're going to keep you guys, but we're not going to really work the album anymore. We want you to go back and do another one.' And that was kind of a bummer, because we had always thought that 'Cailin' would be a good radio song".

The band's then manager, Bill Silva, then arranged to get the single played on influential West Coast alternative-rock stations, including KROQ-FM, where it quickly became a favorite with listeners.

== Personnel ==
=== Band ===
- Scott Russo – vocals
- Steve Morris – lead guitar
- Rob Brewer – rhythm guitar
- Pat "PK" Kim – bass guitar
- Wade Youman – drums, percussion

=== Additional musicians ===
- Geoff Turner – DJ

=== Production ===
- Rick Parashar – producer, engineer, mixing
- Jon Plum – assistant producer, engineer, and mixing
- Geoff Ott – second engineer
- George Marino – mastering
