= Lana Del Rey videography =

Videos and media by American singer-songwriter

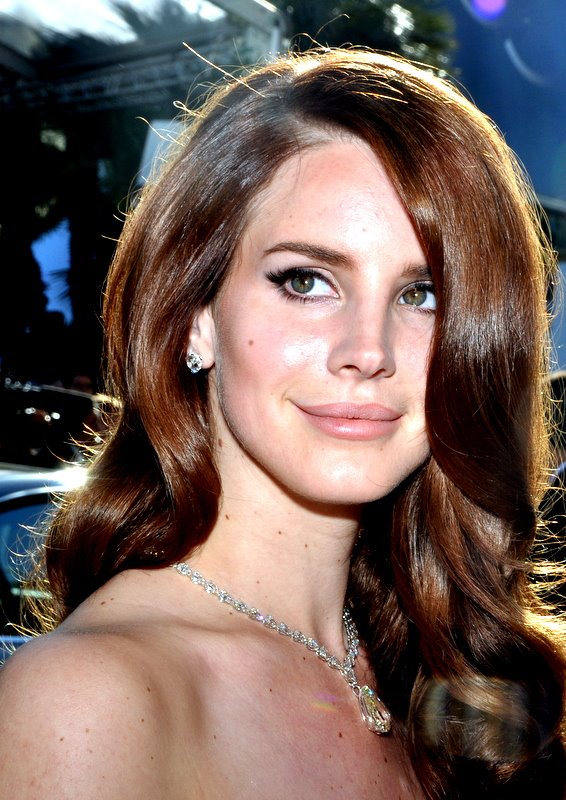
- Del Rey at the 2012 Cannes Film Festival
- Music videos: 55
- Films: 14
- Short films: 6
- Documentary films: 1 (Note: Executive producer)
- Magazine films: 7
- Television appearances: 3
- Web appearances: 15
- Commercials: 3
- Self-directed work: 27

American singer, director and occasional actress Lana Del Rey has appeared in 55 music videos, one documentary film, six short films (five musical), seven magazine films, and three commercials, as well as directing a bulk of her work. Del Rey's first appearance was in the short film Poolside (2010) as Lisa, a rich girl who spends her days smoking cigarettes by the pool. She received top billing for the project. Del Rey then went on to write the treatment for two music films, Ride (2012) and Tropico (2013), which were directed by Anthony Mandler. In 2015, Del Rey served as the executive producer of the film Hi, How Are You Daniel Johnston?. She then made appearances as a performer in Tower of Song: A Memorial Tribute to Leonard Cohen and in The King as herself.

Del Rey has also gained notability as a director. After directing and editing many of the music videos for her first album, Lana Del Ray, she broke into mainstream success with the songs and music videos for "Video Games", and "Blue Jeans" in 2011. Since then, she has directed more music videos, as well as the short film Freak (2016), which she also wrote, and starred as Pamela Courson, alongside Father John Misty, who played her lover, the Doors lead singer, Jim Morrison.

== Music videos ==
=== As a lead artist ===
Key
•	Denotes music video directed by Lana Del Rey

Title	Year	Other artist(s)	Director(s)	Associated album(s)	Ref.
"Methamphetamines" • (unreleased)	2008	—N/a	Lana Del Rey	Non-album song	
"Kill Kill" •	2008	—N/a	Lana Del Rey	Kill Kill / Lana Del Ray	
"Gramma" •	2009	—N/a	Lana Del Rey	Kill Kill / Lana Del Ray	
"Yayo" •	2009	—N/a	Lana Del Rey	Kill Kill / Lana Del Ray	
"Mermaid Motel" •	2009	—N/a	Lana Del Rey	Lana Del Ray	
"Put Me in a Movie" •	2009	—N/a	Lana Del Rey	Lana Del Ray	
"Brite Lites" •	2009	—N/a	Lana Del Rey	Lana Del Ray	
"Jump" •	2009	—N/a	Lana Del Rey	Lana Del Ray	
"Pawn Shop Blues" •	2009	—N/a	Lana Del Rey	Lana Del Ray	
"You Can Be the Boss" •	2010	—N/a	Lana Del Rey	Non-album songs	
"Kinda Outta Luck" •	2010	—N/a	Lana Del Rey	Non-album songs	
"On Our Way" •	2010	—N/a	Lana Del Rey	Non-album songs	
"Hundred Dollar Bill" •	2010	—N/a	Lana Del Rey	Non-album songs	
"Lolita" •	2010	—N/a	Lana Del Rey	Born to Die	
"Diet Mountain Dew" •	2011	—N/a	Lana Del Rey	Born to Die	
"National Anthem" • (demo version)	2011	—N/a	Lana Del Rey	Born to Die	
"Video Games" •	2011	—N/a	Lana Del Rey	Born to Die	
"Blue Jeans" • (original version)	2011	—N/a	Lana Del Rey	Born to Die	
"Born to Die"	2011	—N/a	Yoann Lemoine	Born to Die	
"Blue Jeans" (second version)	2012	—N/a	Yoann Lemoine	Born to Die	
"Carmen" •	2012	—N/a	Lana Del Rey	Born to Die	
"Summertime Sadness"	2012	—N/a	Kyle Newman; Spencer Susser	Born to Die	
"Summertime Sadness" (Cedric Gervais remix)	2012	—N/a	Kyle Newman; Spencer Susser	Born to Die	
"Blue Velvet"	2012	—N/a	Johan Renck	Born to Die: The Paradise Edition / Paradise	
"Bel Air"	2012	—N/a	Kyle Newman; Spencer Susser	Born to Die: The Paradise Edition / Paradise	
"Burning Desire"	2013	—N/a	Anthony Shurmer	Born to Die: The Paradise Edition / Paradise	
"Chelsea Hotel No. 2"	2013	—N/a	Anthony Shurmer	Non-album songs	
"Summer Wine" •	2013	Barrie-James O'Neill	Lana Del Rey	Non-album songs	
"Young and Beautiful"	2013	—N/a	Chris Sweeney; Sophie Muller	The Great Gatsby: Music from Baz Luhrmann's Film	
"Young and Beautiful" (Cedric Gervais remix)	2013	—N/a	Chris Sweeney; Sophie Muller	The Great Gatsby: Music from Baz Luhrmann's Film	
"West Coast"	2014	—N/a	Vincent Haycock	Ultraviolence	
"Shades of Cool"	2014	—N/a	Jake Nava	Ultraviolence	
"Pretty When You Cry" • (unreleased)	2014	—N/a	Lana Del Rey	Ultraviolence	
"Ultraviolence"	2014	—N/a	Francesco Carrozzini	Ultraviolence	
"Honeymoon" (unreleased)	2015	—N/a	Francesco Carrozzini	Honeymoon	
"High by the Beach"	2015	—N/a	Jake Nava	Honeymoon	
"Music to Watch Boys To"	2015	—N/a	Kinga Burza	Honeymoon	
"Love"	2017	—N/a	Rich Lee	Lust for Life	
"Lust for Life"	2017	The Weeknd	Rich Lee	Lust for Life	
"White Mustang"	2017	—N/a	Rich Lee	Lust for Life	
"Mariners Apartment Complex"	2018	—N/a	Chuck Grant	Norman Fucking Rockwell!	
"Venice Bitch"	2018	—N/a	Chuck Grant	Norman Fucking Rockwell!	
"Fuck It, I Love You!" / "The Greatest"	2019	—N/a	Rich Lee	Norman Fucking Rockwell!	
"Doin' Time"	2019	—N/a	Rich Lee	Norman Fucking Rockwell!	
"Don't Call Me Angel"	2019	Ariana Grande; Miley Cyrus	Hannah Lux Davis	Charlie's Angels: Original Motion Picture Soundtrack	
"Let Me Love You Like a Woman" •	2020	—N/a	Lana Del Rey	Chemtrails over the Country Club	
"Summertime (The Gershwin Version)"	2020	—N/a	Unknown	Non-album song	
"Chemtrails over the Country Club"	2021	—N/a	brthr	Chemtrails over the Country Club	
"White Dress"	2021	—N/a	Constellation Jones	Chemtrails over the Country Club	
"Hope Is a Dangerous Thing for a Woman like Me to Have – but I Have It" •	2021	—N/a	Lana Del Rey	Norman Fucking Rockwell!	
"Arcadia" •	2021	—N/a	Lana Del Rey	Blue Banisters	
"Interlude – The Trio" •	2021	—N/a	Lana Del Rey	Blue Banisters	
"Arcadia" • (alternate video)	2021	—N/a	Lana Del Rey	Blue Banisters	
"Blue Banisters" •		—N/a	Lana Del Rey	Blue Banisters	
"Candy Necklace"	2023	Jon Batiste	Rich Lee	Did You Know That There's a Tunnel Under Ocean Blvd	
"Tough"	2024	Quavo	Wyatt Spain Winfrey; Lana Del Rey; Quavo	Non-album song	
"White Feather Hawk Tail Deer Hunter"	2026	—N/a	Unknown	Stove	

=== Guest appearances ===
Title	Year	Artist(s)	Director(s)	Associated album(s)	Ref.
"Stargazing"	2020	The Neighbourhood	Ramez Silyan	Chip Chrome & the Mono-Tones	

== Filmography ==
=== As lead performer ===
Key
†	Denotes film written by Lana Del Rey
•	Denotes film directed by Lana Del Rey

Title	Year	Role(s)	Director(s)	Notes	Ref.
Poolside (credited as Lizzy Grant)	2010	Lisa	Aaron C. Peer	Acting debut	
National Anthem†	2012	Jackie Kennedy / Marilyn Monroe	Anthony Mandler		
Ride†	2012	Artist	Anthony Mandler		
Tropico†	2013	Eve / Mary	Anthony Mandler		
Freak • †	2016	Pamela Courson	Lana Del Rey		
Norman Fucking Rockwell†	2019	Lady of the Canyon	Chuck Grant	Producer, editor, and cinematographer	

=== As executive producer ===
Title	Year	Director(s)	Notes	Ref.
Hi, How Are You Daniel Johnston?	2015	Gabriel Sunday	Documentary film	

=== Magazine films ===
Title	Year	Director(s)	Publication	Ref.
Lana Del Rey	2012	Sean and Seng	Interview	
ZOO Presents Lana Del Rey	2012	Bryan Adams	ZOO	
Nylon X Lana Del Rey	2012	Unknown	Nylon	
L'Officiel Presents Lana Del Rey	2012	Nicole Nodland	L'Officiel	
FADER Presents Lana Del Rey	2014	Maia Stern	FADER	
Madame Figaro Presents Lana Del Rey	2014	Unknown	Madame Figaro	
Lana Del Rey August/September Issue	2015	Unknown	Complex	
In Bed (and in the Bathtub) with Lana Del Rey	2020	Charlie Grant	Interview	
Lana Del Rey's Tour Diary	2024	Chuck Grant	Vogue	

== Television ==
Title	Year	Role(s)	Director(s)	Notes	Ref.
Tower of Song: A Memorial Tribute to Leonard Cohen	2017	Herself	Jack Bender	Tribute concert	
The Kacey Musgraves Christmas Show	2019	Herself	Chris Howe	Amazon Prime concert special	
The Secret Lives of Mormon Wives	2025	Herself		Guest appearance	

== Web interviews ==
Publication / series	Year	Notes	Ref.
index	2008	Episode: "Lizzy Grant Interview"	
RnB Junk	2011	Episode: "An Interview with Lana Del Rey"	
BBC Radio 1	2011–2019	7 appearances	
One-to-Watch by Myspace	2012	Episode: "Meet Lana Del Rey"	
NME Interviews	2012	Episode: "Lana Del Rey"	
Complex Cover	2017	Episode: "Lana Del Rey On "Lust for Life," Avoiding Cultural Appropriation, and Politics"	
KRQQ	2017	Episode: "Lana Del Rey Talks New Album ‘Lust For Life’ On The Kevin & Bean Show"	
Beats Radio One	2017–2018	2 episodes	
MTV News	2018	2 episodes	
World Cafe	2018	Episode: "Lana Del Rey Interview"	
On Air With Ryan Seacrest	2018–2019	2 episodes	
Gucci on YouTube	2019	Episode: "Lana Del Rey behind the scene of #ForeverGuilty Campaign"	
104.3 MY FM	2019	Episode: "Lana Del Rey Talks Working w/ Ariana Grande & Miley Cyrus, James Franco, & More!"	
Alt 98.7	2019	Episode: "Lana Del Rey Talks ’Norman F**king Rockwell’ Working w/ Jack Antonoff, Covering Sublime & More"	
KRQQ	2019	Episode: "Lana Del Rey Talks Sublime, New Album 'Norman F***ing Rockwell'"	

== Commercials ==
List of commercials, showing company / product, year released, and description
Company	Year	Description	Ref.
Keds	2009	Commercial features Del Rey in 2009 walking around Coney Island, Brooklyn while her song "Yayo" plays in the background.	
H&M	2012	Commercial features Del Rey in an old-1960s-inspired lounge where she sings a cover of Bobby Vinton's famous prom anthem "Blue Velvet", which was featured on her second EP Paradise (2012).	
Gucci	2019	Commercial features Del Rey alongside Jared Leto as a married couple in an old-1960s-inspired advertisement for Gucci Guilty, which they are the faces of. The video also features a cameo appearance from Courtney Love.	

== Video games ==
Year	Title	Role	Notes	Ref(s)
2026	Grand Theft Auto VI	Delta Dawne	Back Country Radio host (voice-over)	
