= Born to Die: The Paradise Edition =

Studio album (reissue) by Lana Del Rey
- Released: November 9, 2012
- Recorded: 2010–2012
- Studios: Sarm West, The Square (London); Electric Lemon, Human Feel, Westlake (Los Angeles); Shangri-La (Malibu); The Green Building (Santa Monica, California)
- Genres: Alternative pop; baroque pop; indie pop; orchestral pop; trip hop
- Length: 93:47
- Labels: Interscope; Polydor
- Producers: Patrik Berger; Jeff Bhasker; Chris Braide; DK; Emile Haynie; Dan Heath; Tim Larcombe; Rick Nowels; Justin Parker; Robopop; Al Shux; Rick Rubin

Lana Del Rey chronology
Paradise (2012)	Born to Die: The Paradise Edition (2012)	Tropico (2013)

Born to Die: The Paradise Edition is the reissue of American singer-songwriter Lana Del Rey's second studio album Born to Die (2012). It was released on November 9, 2012, by Interscope and Polydor Records. Released ten months after the original, The Paradise Edition features eight newly recorded tracks, which were simultaneously made available on the standalone extended play Paradise (2012). Although having worked with several producers for each record, Emile Haynie and Rick Nowels are the only producers whose contributions are featured on both discs.

The Paradise Edition performed moderately on international record charts in Europe, where it charted separately from Born to Die and Paradise. While the project was not directly supported by singles of its own, the tracks "Ride" and "Burning Desire" were released from Paradise on September 25, 2012, and March 13, 2013, while "Dark Paradise" was serviced from Born to Die on March 1, 2013. A remix of the track "Summertime Sadness" from Born to Die, produced by Cedric Gervais, was released independently from either project on July 11, 2013; it was later included on select reissues of The Paradise Edition after experiencing success on record charts worldwide.

== Background and release ==
"It's not a new album, it's more like an afterthought, it's the Paradise edition of Born to Die. It's like seven new songs that kind of put a period on the statement that I was making when I was making the record. It's beautiful."

— Del Rey describing the conception and meaning of The Paradise Edition.

Del Rey released her second studio album Born to Die in January 2012 by Interscope Records, Polydor Records, and Stranger Records. It debuted at number two on the U.S. Billboard 200 with first-week sales of 77,000 copies; in doing so, it became the highest opening week for a major-label debut by a female artist since Dream with Me (2011) by Jackie Evancho entered at number two in the United States. In July, Del Rey expressed her intentions release an expanded version of Born to Die subtitled The Paradise Edition, which was initially expected to contain seven newly recorded tracks to supplement the original record. Del Rey unveiled its cover in September, in which she is photographed in a beige-colored one-piece swimsuit standing before a tropical background, and elaborated that the reissue would contain the fifteen-track deluxe version of Born to Die and nine previously unreleased songs.

The final product was first released on November 9 in Australia, and was later made available on November 13 in the United States. The Paradise Edition was packaged as a two-disc product in its physical variation, while a digital version was serviced to online music stores. The newly recorded material was simultaneously made available on the standalone extended play Paradise (2012). The Paradise Edition was released in vinyl record packaging on November 20; it came with the vinyl for Paradise, and designated a slipcase to hold a separately-purchased vinyl of Born to Die. A limited edition box set of the project was released on December 4, 2012; it contained the physical version of the record, an eight-track remix disc, a six-music video DVD, four printed photographs, and a two-track vinyl record with remixes of "Blue Velvet".

== New material ==
The eight tracks appended on The Paradise Edition exemplify a "cinematic" musical style first introduced through Born to Die, and incorporates frequent electric guitar and piano instrumentation like the preceding record. The newly recorded material employs more profane language than the original record, particularly with descriptions of sexual encounters. The second disc commences with the track "Ride", which Tom Breihan from Stereogum described as a "string-drenched ballad" that saw Del Rey exploring the "crossover-soul-pop" musical styles that British singer Adele is commonly associated with. The follow-up track "American" heavily integrates Americana references in its lyrics, and employs minimalist piano and string instrumentation that Sian Watson from Associated Press felt placed the "smoky, effortless vocals" at the forefront of the song. "Cola" begins with the lines "My pussy tastes like Pepsi-Cola / My eyes are wide like cherry pies", which PopMatters' Enio Chiola felt solidified the recurring concept of "a girl trying to find her father in her elder lovers" that unifies the additional tracks.

The fourth track "Body Electric" was distinguished by Jesse Cataldo of Slant Magazine for its string instrumentation, which he described as a "pre-established atmospheric skeletion" given the frequency of their usage on the disc. "Blue Velvet" is a cover version of the 1950s track written by Bernie Wayne and Lee Moris, and was interpreted by Chiola as a "romantic tribute of lovelorn and loss." On the track "Gods & Monsters", Carl Williott from Idolator noted that Del Rey delivered the lyrics "I was an angel / Looking to get fucked hard" and "Fuck yeah, give it to me / This is heaven, what I truly want" with a "sultry numbness" that avoided coming across as a generic song about sex. "Yayo" first appeared on Del Rey's debut studio album Lana Del Ray (2010); David Edwards of Drowned in Sound described the track as "stammeringly beautiful", and directed his commentary towards the genuine emotions of "a heartbeat away from collapse." According to Williott, the eighth and final track "Bel Air" is a "melancholy waltz" that notably employs a "forest nymph chant" during its refrain.

== Promotion ==
"Ride" was originally announced as the lead single from The Paradise Edition, although the track was later recognized as an offering from the standalone extended play Paradise; it was premiered and released through the iTunes Store on September 25, 2012. The song respectively peaked at numbers 21 and 26 on the U.S. Billboard Rock Songs and Adult Alternative Songs component charts, and performed sporadically across international singles charts. After The Paradise Edition was released, "Dark Paradise" was serviced as the sixth single from Born to Die on March 1, 2013, and reached the lower ends of select European singles charts.

== Commercial performance ==
The Paradise Edition charted together with Born to Die on the U.S. Billboard 200, and consequently assisted its parent record in rising from number 79 to number 37 with release-week sales of 16,000 copies. Having charted separately from Born to Die and Paradise throughout much of Europe, the record performed moderately on international record charts. It charted at number four on the Polish Albums Chart, and respectively reached numbers 6 and 15 on the Belgian Ultratop charts in Flanders and Wallonia. The project peaked at number 15 on the Dutch MegaCharts, and appeared at number 22 on both The Official Finnish Charts and the Swedish Sverigetopplistan. Although a specific charting position was not released, The Paradise Edition was certified gold by the Syndicat National de l'Édition Phonographique in France. In Oceania, it reached number 17 on the Australian ARIA Charts, and was acknowledged with a platinum certification in the country. The project also reached number six on the Official New Zealand Music Chart, where it was eventually certified platinum.

== Track listing ==
Credits adapted from the liner notes of Born to Die: The Paradise Edition.

Disc 1 – Born to Die (Deluxe edition)
No.	Title	Writer(s)	Producer(s)	Length
1.	"Born to Die"	Lana Del Rey; Justin Parker	Emile Haynie; Parker^{[b]}	4:46
2.	"Off to the Races"	Del Rey; Tim Larcombe	Patrik Berger; Haynie	5:00
3.	"Blue Jeans"	Del Rey; Haynie; Dan Heath	Haynie	3:30
4.	"Video Games"	Del Rey; Parker	Robopop	4:42
5.	"Diet Mountain Dew"	Del Rey; Mike Daly	Haynie; Jeff Bhasker^{[a]}; Daly^{[b]}	3:43
6.	"National Anthem"	Del Rey; Parker; The Nexus	Haynie; Bhasker^{[c]}; David Sneddon^{[b]}; James Bauer-Mein^{[b]}	3:51
7.	"Dark Paradise"	Del Rey; Rick Nowels	Haynie; Nowels^{[a]}	4:03
8.	"Radio"	Del Rey; Parker	Haynie; Parker^{[c]}	3:34
9.	"Carmen"	Del Rey; Parker	Haynie; Bhasker^{[c]}; Parker^{[b]}	4:08
10.	"Million Dollar Man"	Del Rey; Chris Braide	Haynie; Braide	3:51
11.	"Summertime Sadness"	Del Rey; Nowels	Haynie; Nowels^{[a]}	4:25
12.	"This Is What Makes Us Girls"	Del Rey; Larcombe; Jim Irvin	Al Shux; Haynie	3:58
13.	"Without You"	Del Rey; Sacha Skarbek	Haynie	3:49
14.	"Lolita"	Del Rey; Liam Howe; Hannah Robinson	Haynie; Howe^{[a]}	3:40
15.	"Lucky Ones"	Del Rey; Nowels	Haynie; Nowels^{[a]}	3:45
Total length:				60:40

Disc 1 – Born to Die (Japanese edition bonus track)
No.	Title	Writer(s)	Producer(s)	Length
16.	"Video Games" (Joy Orbison Remix)	Del Rey; Parker	Robopop; Orbison^{[d]}	4:59
Total length:				65:39

Disc 2 – Paradise
No.	Title	Writer(s)	Producer(s)	Length
1.	"Ride"	Del Rey; Parker	Rubin	4:49
2.	"American"	Del Rey; Nowels; Haynie	Nowels; Haynie^{[a]}	4:08
3.	"Cola"	Del Rey; Nowels	Nowels; DK^{[a]}	4:20
4.	"Body Electric"	Del Rey; Nowels	Nowels; Dan Heath	3:53
5.	"Blue Velvet"	Lee Morris; Bernie Wayne	Haynie	2:38
6.	"Gods & Monsters"	Del Rey; Tim Larcombe	Larcombe; Haynie^{[c]}	3:57
7.	"Yayo"	Lana Del Rey	Heath; Haynie	5:21
8.	"Bel Air"	Del Rey; Heath	Heath	3:57
Total length:				33:07

Disc 2 – Paradise (Special edition bonus track)
No.	Title	Writer(s)	Producer(s)	Length
9.	"Burning Desire"	Del Rey; Parker	Haynie	3:51
Total length:				36:58

Disc 2 – Paradise (French edition bonus track)
No.	Title	Writer(s)	Producer(s)	Length
10.	"Summertime Sadness" (Lana Del Rey vs. Cedric Gervais)	Del Rey; Nowels	Cedric Gervais	6:52
Total length:				43:50

Disc 2 – Paradise (German Amazon edition bonus tracks)
No.	Title	Writer(s)	Producer(s)	Length
9.	"Blue Velvet" (Penguin Prison Remix)	Wayne; Morris	Haynie	5:03
10.	"Summertime Sadness" (Todd Terry Remix)	Del Rey; Nowels; De Jour	Haynie; Nowels	6:26
11.	"National Anthem" (bretonLABS Remix)	Del Rey; Parker; The Nexus	Haynie; Bhasker	4:01
12.	"Blue Jeans" (RAC Mix)	Del Rey; Haynie; Heath	Haynie	3:42
13.	"Born to Die" (Kris Di Angelis 'Love Below' Remix)	Del Rey; Parker	Haynie	5:10
14.	"Video Games" (Jakwob and Etherwood Remix)	Del Rey; Parker	Robopop	3:44
Total length:				81:49

Born to Die: The Paradise Edition – Box set edition (bonus CD)
No.	Title	Writer(s)	Producer(s)	Length
1.	"Video Games" (Joy Orbison Remix)	Del Rey; Parker	Robopop; Sterling Fox; Joy Orbison^{[d]}	5:03
2.	"Video Games" (Omid 16B Remix)	Del Rey; Parker	Robopop; Omid Nourizadeh^{[d]}	5:13
3.	"Born to Die" (Moodymann Remix)	Del Rey; Parker	Haynie; Parker; Moody^{[d]}	6:14
4.	"Born to Die" (Gemini Remix)	Del Rey; Parker	Haynie; Parker; Thomas Slinger PKA Gemini^{[d]}	4:51
5.	"Blue Jeans" (Gesaffelstein Remix)	Del Rey; Haynie; Dan Heath	Haynie; Gesaffelstein	4:34
6.	"Blue Jeans" (Penguin Prison Remix)	Del Rey; Haynie; Dan Heath	Haynie; Penguin Prison	5:40
7.	"National Anthem" (Fred Falke Remix Edit)	Del Rey; Parker; The Nexus	Haynie; The Nexus; Jeff Bhasker; Fred Falke^{[d]}	3:49
8.	"National Anthem" (Tensnake Remix)	Del Rey; Parker; The Nexus	Haynie; The Nexus; Bhasker	3:46
Total length:				40:10

Born to Die: The Paradise Edition – Box set edition (bonus DVD)
No.	Title	Director(s)	Length
1.	"Video Games" (music video)	Del Rey	4:47
2.	"Born to Die" (music video)	Mourad Balkeddar; Yoann Lemoine	4:47
3.	"Blue Jeans" (music video)	Oualid Mouaness; Lemoine	4:19
4.	"Blue Jeans" (Lana Del Rey version)	Del Rey	4:01
5.	"National Anthem" (music video)	Heather Heller; Anthony Mandler	7:49
6.	"Summertime Sadness" (music video)	Spencer Susser; Kyle Newman	4:43
Total length:			30:26

Born to Die: The Paradise Edition – Box set edition (bonus 7" vinyl record)
No.	Title	Writer(s)	Producer(s)	Length
1.	"Blue Velvet"	Wayne; Morris	Haynie	2:38
2.	"Blue Velvet" (Penguin Prison Remix)	Wayne; Morris	Haynie; Penguin Prison^{[d]}	5:03
Total length:				7:41

Notes

- ^{^[a]} signifies a co-producer
- ^{^[b]} signifies a vocal producer
- ^{^[c]} signifies an additional producer
- ^{^[d]} signifies a remixer

== Personnel ==
Credits adapted from the liner notes of Born to Die: The Paradise Edition.

=== Disc 1 ===
Performance credits

- Lana Del Rey – vocals (all tracks)
- Emilie Bauer-Mein – backing vocals (track 6)
- James Bauer-Mein – backing vocals (track 6)
- Lenha Labelle – French vocals (track 9)
- David Sneddon – backing vocals (track 6)
- Hannah Robinson – backing vocals (track 14)
- Maria Vidal – additional vocals (tracks 7, 15)

Instruments

- Patrik Berger – guitar, bass guitar, percussion, synthesizer, sampler, drum programming (track 2)
- Jeff Bhasker – guitar (tracks 1, 5, 6); keyboards (track 5); additional keyboards (track 6, 9); additional strings (track 9)
- Chris Braide – guitar, acoustic piano, strings, drum programming (track 10)
- Pelle Hansen – cello (track 2)
- Emile Haynie – drums (tracks 1, 2, 3, 5, 6, 7, 8, 10, 11, 12, 13, 15); keyboards (tracks 1, 2, 6, 7, 8, 9, 11, 13, 15); additional keyboards (tracks 2, 5, 10, 12); guitar (tracks 3, 8, 9, 13, 15)
- Dan Heath – flute (track 11), additional strings (track 13)
- Erik Holm – viola (track 2)
- Liam Howe – additional keyboards, programming (track 14)
- Devrim Karaoglu – additional synthesizer, orchestral drums (track 7); additional pads (track 11)
- Brent Kolatalo – additional drums (track 5)
- Ken Lewis – additional vocal noises (track 1); additional drums (track 5)
- Rick Nowels – guitar (track 7); additional strings (track 11); keyboards (track 15)
- Dean Reid – pads (track 7)
- Al Shux – guitar, bass guitar, keyboards, programming (track 12)
- Sacha Skarbek – omnichord (track 13)
- Fredrik Syberg – violin (track 2)
- Patrick Warren – chamberlain strings (track 7); additional strings (track 11); guitar, keyboards (tracks 11, 15); strings, secondary strings (track 15)

Technical and production

- Carl Bagge – string arrangements (track 2)
- Patrik Berger – production (track 2)
- Jeff Bhasker – co-production (track 5), additional production (tracks 6, 9)
- Chris Braide – production (track 10)
- Lorenzo Cosi – engineering (track 13)
- Mike Daly – vocal production (track 5)
- John Davis – mastering (all tracks)
- Duncan Fuller – mixing assistant (tracks 1, 2, 3, 8, 10, 11, 13)
- Chris Galland – mixing assistant (tracks 5, 6, 7, 12, 15)
- Larry Gold – string arrangements, conductor (tracks 1, 5, 6, 7, 8, 9, 11, 12, 13, 15)
- Dan Grech-Marguerat – mixing (tracks 1, 2, 3, 8, 10, 11, 13, 14)
- Emile Haynie – production (tracks 1, 2, 3, 5, 6, 7, 8, 9, 10, 11, 12, 13, 14, 15)
- Dan Heath – string arrangements, conductor (tracks 3, 6)
- Liam Howe – co-production (track 14)
- Brent Kolatalo – additional recording (track 1)
- Erik Madrid – mixing assistant (tracks 5, 6, 7, 12, 15)
- Manny Marroquin – mixing (tracks 5, 6, 7, 9, 12, 15)
- Kieron Menzies – engineering (track 15)
- The Nexus – vocal production (track 6)
- Rick Nowels – co-production (tracks 7, 11, 15); vocal production (track 15)
- Justin Parker – vocal production (tracks 1, 9); additional production (track 8)
- Robopop – production, mixing (track 4)
- Al Shux – production, vocal production (track 12)
- Steve Tirpak – string assistant (tracks 1, 5, 6, 7, 8, 9, 11, 12, 13, 15)

=== Disc 2 ===
Performance credits

- Lana Del Rey – vocals (all tracks); backing vocals (track 7)

Instruments

- James Gadson – drums (track 1)
- Emile Haynie – drums (track 2, 7); additional keyboards (track 7)
- Dan Heath – percussion (track 4); horns (track 6); keyboards (track 7); strings (tracks 7, 8); piano (track 8)
- Devrim Karaoglu – drums (track 3)
- Jason Lader – bass guitar (track 1)
- Tim Larcombe – keyboards, guitar, drums (track 6)
- The Larry Gold Orchestra – strings (track 5)
- Songa Lee – violin (tracks 1, 8)
- Kieron Menzies – drum programming (track 3)
- Rick Nowels – synthesizer (track 2); keyboards (tracks 2, 3); bass guitar, acoustic guitar, drums (track 3); piano, mellotron, strings (track 4)
- Tim Pierce – electric guitar (track 2); slide guitar (tracks 3, 4)
- Zac Rae – piano, keyboards (track 1)
- Kathleen Sloan – violin (tracks 1, 8)
- Patrick Warren – electric guitar, synthesizer, piano (tracks 2, 3, 4); strings, glockenspiel, brass (track 3); organ (tracks 3, 4); dulcitone, bells, Optigan, mellotron (track 4)

Technical and production

- Graham Archer – vocal engineering (track 7)
- Ben Baptie – mixing assistant (track 5)
- Spencer Burgess Jr. – recording assistant (track 5)
- Nikki Calvert – engineering (track 8)
- Jeremy Cochise Ball – mixing (track 7)
- John Davis – mastering (tracks 1, 2, 3, 4, 5, 6, 7, 8)
- DK – co-production (track 3)
- Tom Elmhirst – mixing (track 5)
- Chris Garcia – additional recording (tracks 2, 3); recording (track 4)
- Larry Gold – string arrangements (track 5)
- Emile Haynie – co-production (track 2); production (tracks 5, 7); additional production (track 6)
- Dan Heath – string arrangements (tracks 1, 6); orchestral arrangements (tracks 2, 4); production (tracks 4, 7, 8); engineering (track 8)
- Jason Lader – recording (track 1)
- Tim Larcombe – production (track 6)
- Eric Lynn – recording assistant (track 1)
- Kieron Menzies – recording, mixing (tracks 2, 3, 4)
- Rick Nowels – production (tracks 2, 3, 4)
- Sean Oakley – recording assistant (track 1)
- Robert Orton – mixing (track 6)
- Tucker Robinson – string recording (track 1); engineering (track 8)
- Jeff Rothschild – mixing (track 8)
- Rick Rubin – production (track 1)
- Andrew Scheps – mixing (track 1)
- Peter Stanislaus – mixing (track 8)
- Jordan Stilwell – additional recording (tracks 2, 3)

== Charts ==
=== Weekly charts ===
Chart (2012–2013)	Peak position
Australian Albums (ARIA)	17
Belgian Albums (Ultratop Flanders)	6
Belgian Albums (Ultratop Wallonia)	15
Dutch Albums (Album Top 100)	15
Finnish Albums (Suomen virallinen lista)	20
Japanese Albums (Oricon)	35
Mexican Albums (Top 100 Mexico)	22
New Zealand Albums (RMNZ)	6
Polish Albums (ZPAV)	4
Swedish Albums (Sverigetopplistan)	22

=== Year-end charts ===
Chart (2013)	Position
Australian Albums (ARIA)	68
Belgian Albums (Ultratop Flanders)	88
Belgian Albums (Ultratop Wallonia)	98
New Zealand Albums (RMNZ)	34

Chart (2014)	Position
Mexican Albums (Top 100 Mexico)	78

== Certifications ==
Region	Certification	Certified units/sales
Australia (ARIA)	Platinum	70,000^{^}
France (SNEP)	Gold	50,000^{*}
Mexico (AMPROFON)	Platinum+Gold	90,000^{^}
New Zealand (RMNZ)	Platinum	15,000^{^}
Spain (Promusicae)	Platinum	40,000^{^}
Sweden (GLF)	2× Platinum	80,000^{‡}
^{*} Sales figures based on certification alone.^{^} Shipments figures based on certification alone.^{‡} Sales+streaming figures based on certification alone.

== Release history ==
Region	Date	Format	Label	Ref.
Australia	November 9, 2012	CD; digital download	Universal Music	
United Kingdom	November 9, 2012	CD; digital download	Polydor	
United States	November 13, 2012	CD; digital download	Interscope	
United States	November 20, 2012	LP	Interscope	
United States	December 4, 2012	Box set	Interscope	
