= Gods & Monsters (song) =

Song by Lana Del Rey

Song by Lana Del Rey

from the EP Paradise and Tropico
- Released: November 9, 2012
- Studio: The Square Recording Studio (London, UK)
- Genre: trip hop • alt-pop • baroque pop
- Length: 3:58
- Label: Interscope; Polydor
- Songwriters: Elizabeth Grant; Tim Larcombe
- Producers: Tim Larcombe; Emile Haynie

Audio
- "Gods & Monsters" on YouTube

"Gods & Monsters" is a song by American singer and songwriter Lana Del Rey from her third extended play Paradise and the reissue of her second album Born to Die, Born to Die: The Paradise Edition. "Gods & Monsters" was released on November 9, 2012, with the rest of the Paradise EP.

== Usage in media ==
Along with "Body Electric" and "Bel Air", "Gods & Monsters" was featured in Del Rey's short film, Tropico. Following the film's release, an EP of the same name that featured the three songs featured in the film was released onto the iTunes store on December 6, 2013. Jessica Lange covered the song in the third episode of American Horror Story: Freak Show. Lange's cover was released to digital outlets on October 22, 2014.

The song has also been used in the soundtrack of the documentary BOSCH: The Garden of Dreams (2016).

== Critical reception ==
"Gods & Monsters" received mixed to positive reviews from contemporary music critics. Idolator reviewer Carl Williot said that "on paper, parts of 'Gods And Monsters' could be a trashy outtake from Rihanna's 'S&M': 'I was an angel / Looking to get fucked hard…Fuck yeah, give it to me / This is heaven, what I truly want.' But the lines are delivered with such sultry numbness that it could be some grand statement on sex and detachment, whether or not that was Lana's intention." Jesse Cataldo of Slant Magazine said that nothing on Paradise except "Burning Desire" and "Gods & Monsters" was as good as the songs on Born to Die. Cataldo went on to call the song "snappy [and] mesmerizing languorousness."

== Commercial performance ==
Due to the popularity of Paradise, "Gods & Monsters", along with several other songs, had ended up charting in multiple territories in 2012. The song became a top 40 hit in the United Kingdom, peaking at number 39 due to its usage in an advert for EastEnders' "Who Killed Lucy?" storyline. It also peaked at number 15 on the Billboard Hot Rock Songs chart. "Gods & Monsters" had gained popularity again in 2014 after it was covered by Jessica Lange on American Horror Story: Freak Show.

== Credits and personnel ==
Credits adapted from the liner notes of Paradise.

Performance

- Lana Del Rey – primary artist

Instruments

- Dan Heath – horns
- Tim Larcombe – keyboard, guitar, drums

Technical

- John Davis – mastering
- Emile Haynie – additional production
- Dan Heath – string arrangements
- Tim Larcombe – production
- Robert Orton – mixing

== Charts ==
Chart performance for "Gods & Monsters"
| Chart (2012–2014) | Peak position |
|---|---|
| France (SNEP) | 92 |
| UK Singles (OCC) | 39 |
| US Hot Rock Songs (Billboard) | 15 |

== Certifications ==
Certifications for "Gods & Monsters"
| Region | Certification | Certified units/sales |
|---|---|---|
| United Kingdom (BPI) | Silver | 200,000^{‡} |
| United States (RIAA) | Gold | 500,000^{‡} |
^{‡} Sales+streaming figures based on certification alone.

== Jessica Lange version ==
"Gods & Monsters"
- The single's digital artwork, using a promotional photo from American Horror Story: Freak Show

Single by Jessica Lange
- Released: October 22, 2014
- Genre: Soundtrack
- Length: 3:55
- Label: 20th Century Fox
- Songwriters: Elizabeth Grant; Tim Larcombe

Jessica Lange singles chronology
| "Life on Mars?" (2014) | "Gods & Monsters" (2014) | "September Song" (2014) |

In 2014, American actress Jessica Lange covered Lana Del Rey's "Gods & Monsters" for the American Horror Story: Freak Show episode "Edward Mordrake (Part 1)". The cover was released as a single on October 22, 2014.

=== Critical reception ===
The cover has received positive reviews from music critics and fans of American Horror Story and Lana Del Rey. Spin.com praised the song but criticized the show for censoring some of the most explicit lyrics in the song. The Huffington Post called Lange's cover a "spooky rendition" of the song, and the highlight of the episode. BuzzFeed said that Jessica Lange had "slayed" the song.

== Rue Snider version ==
"Gods & Monsters"

Single by Rue Snider
- Released: March 1, 2019
- Recorded: September 2017
- Studio: The Bomb Shelter
- Genre: Indie rock
- Length: 3:28
- Label: Independent
- Songwriters: Elizabeth Grant; Tim Larcombe
- Producer: Andrija Tokic

Rue Snider singles chronology
| "Tripping on a Raft with Girls/Go Back to Carolina" (2018) | "Gods & Monsters" (2019) | "City Living/Orlando" (2018) |

In 2019, Brooklyn singer songwriter Rue Snider covered Lana Del Rey's "Gods & Monsters" as the follow-up single to his digital 7" "Tripping on a Raft with Girls/Go Back to Carolina". The song was recorded at The Bomb Shelter in Nashville by Andrija Tokic (Alabama Shakes platinum debut Boys & Girls) during the sessions for Snider's 2018 LP City Living. The cover was released as a single on March 1, 2019.

=== Critical reception ===
The cover received positive reviews from music critics. That Buzzing Sound praised the song, "Rue Snider tackles Lana Del Rey's "Gods & Monsters" by injecting it with a much needed sonic blast."
