= Tropico (2013 film) =

2013 film

- Film poster
- Directed by: Anthony Mandler
- Written by: Lana Del Rey
- Based on: Adam and Eve; Paradise by Lana Del Rey
- Produced by: Heather Heller
- Starring: Lana Del Rey; Shaun Ross
- Cinematography: David Devlin
- Edited by: Jeff Selis
- Music by: Lana Del Rey
- Release dates: December 4, 2013 (Theatrical premiere, Los Angeles); December 5, 2013 (Digital release)
- Running time: 27 minutes
- Country: United States
- Language: English

Full film
- Tropico on YouTube

Tropico is a 2013 musical short film directed by Anthony Mandler, based on the Biblical story of sin and redemption. Split into three chapters, the film was written by Lana Del Rey, who also starred alongside Shaun Ross. Del Rey plays a dual role, portraying the biblical figure of Eve, as well as Mary, the mother of Jesus, while Ross stars as Adam. The film is set to three songs from Del Rey's 2012 extended play (EP) Paradise.

Tropico opened to critical acclaim at its December 4, 2013 premiere at the Cinerama Dome in Hollywood, California. The film was then released digitally on Del Rey's Vevo page the following day. It was also included in the track listing of the film's soundtrack EP, released exclusively to the iTunes Store.

== Plot ==
=== Chapter 1 – Body Electric ===
The movie starts out with Adam (Shaun Ross) and Eve (Del Rey) in the Garden of Eden. God (portrayed by a John Wayne character), Jesus, Marilyn Monroe, and Elvis Presley are all present with Adam and Eve – as "Body Electric" begins to play. The whole movie is intercut with scenes of Del Rey playing Jesus' mother Mary. At the end of the song, Eve – tempted by the snake – decides to eat an apple from Tree of Knowledge of Good and Evil. After she eats it, thunder strikes and she faints. Adam then decides to eat from the apple as well in order to join his lover. As a result of this, they are cast out of their "Paradise", the Garden of Eden.

=== Chapter 2 – Gods & Monsters ===
Del Rey then starts to recite Walt Whitman's "I Sing the Body Electric" as time flash forwards to a modern-day Adam and Eve living in Los Angeles; Del Rey works as a stripper while Ross is a gang member who also works as a clerk at a convenience store during the day. In this segment – "Gods & Monsters" begins to play. After the song ends, Del Rey recites Allen Ginsberg's "Howl" as a group of wealthy middle aged men are seen surprising their friend on his birthday by bringing him strippers. A couple of minutes after the strippers enter the room, Ross and his gang suddenly show up with guns in hand and steal all their money.

=== Chapter 3 – Bel Air ===
God appears and begins to narrate John Mitchum's poem "America, Why I Love Her" ("You ask me why I love her? Well, give me time. I'll explain. Have you seen a Kansas sunset, or an Arizona rain?"). Adam and Eve then get in their car and end up driving to a country-side wheat field. Clips show the pair being baptised as they begin to undress. "Bel Air" then plays in the sunset. The two characters then ascend back into heaven, having finally redeemed themselves, as flying saucers appear in the sky.

== Cast ==
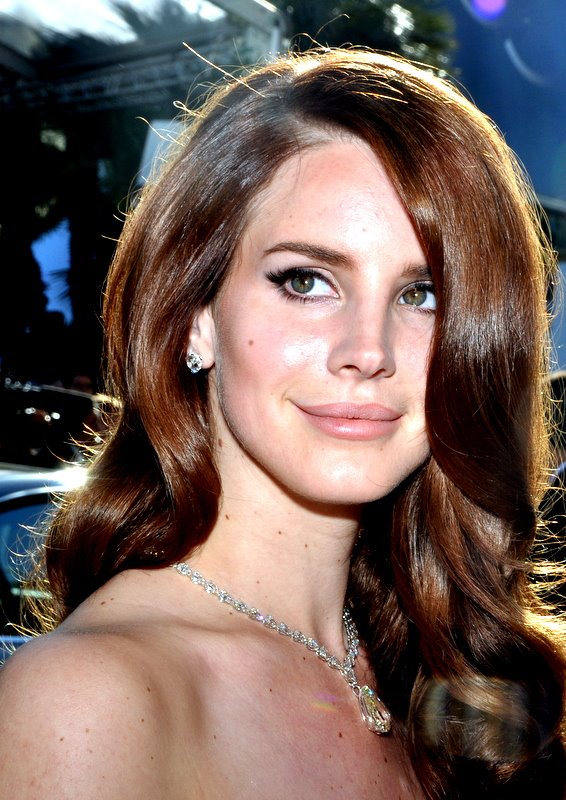
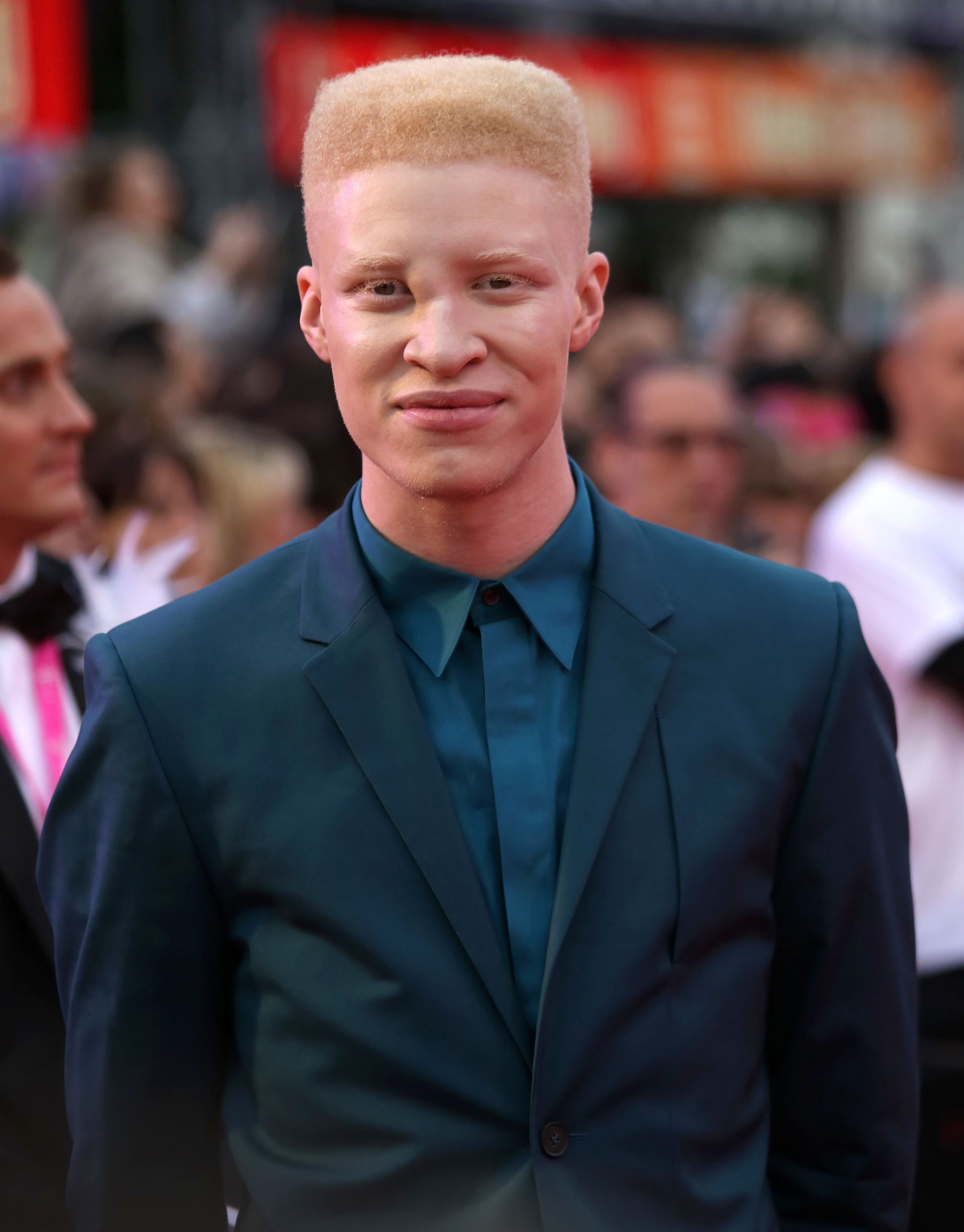
Lana Del Rey (left) stars as Eve and Mary. Shaun Ross (right) stars as Adam.

Religious figures

- Lana Del Rey as Eve and Mary
- Shaun Ross as Adam
- Kevin Lee Light as Jesus

Pop icons

- Jeffrey Wayne Sutherland as John Wayne
- Lloyd Douglas as Elvis Presley
- Jodi Fleisher as Marilyn Monroe

== Production and release ==
Tropico was filmed in late June 2013; it was directed by Anthony Mandler, who also directed Del Rey's previous music videos for "National Anthem" and "Ride". Via social media platforms, Del Rey released several promotional images for the film, one depicting Del Rey in a mantilla as Mary, Mother of Jesus and another with Del Rey holding a snake and posing as Eve, the biblical wife of Adam from the Book of Genesis. In August 2013, Del Rey announced that the film would have two premieres: one at the Hollywood Forever Cemetery in Los Angeles and one in an unspecified location in New York; she referred to the short film as a "farewell". Critics noted that this contradicted other claims by Del Rey that she would release a third studio album, with a demo of the song "Black Beauty" leaking online. On November 22, 2013, an official trailer for Tropico was released; at the end of the trailer, it was announced that the film would be uploaded to Del Rey's official VEVO account on December 5, 2013. On December 3, 2013, it was announced that the film would premiere at the Cinerama Dome in Hollywood, California, prior to its VEVO release. Prior to playing the movie, Del Rey announced the title of her upcoming third album and explained to the audience what she meant when she said that the film is a "farewell", stating: "I really just wanted us all to be together so I could try and visually close out my [Born to Die/Paradise] chapter[s] before I release the new record, Ultraviolence".

== Annotations ==
- 00:06 – The Holy Bible: Genesis 1: 2–4.
- 00:32 – Pater Noster.
- 00:45 – Jewish Invocation.
- 01:35 – Marilyn Monroe.
- 01:39 – Elvis Presley.
- 01:52 – Marilyn Monroe as (Sugar "Kane" Kowalczyk). 'I'm Through With Love', Some Like It Hot, (United Artists, 1959).
- 01:54 – NCIS, (2003–) / John Wayne as (Capt. Nathan Cutting Brittles). She Wore a Yellow Ribbon, (RKO, 1949).
- 02:18 – Marilyn Monroe. The Seven Year Itch, (20th Century Fox, 1955).
- Body Electric.
- 06:32 – Walt Whitman. "I Sing the Body Electric", Leaves of Grass, (1892).
- Gods & Monsters.
- 14:54 – Allen Ginsberg. 'Howl'.
- 18:11 – John Mitchum. 'America, Why I Love Her'.
- Bel Air.

== Reception ==
Upon release, Tropico received mostly positive reviews from critics. Jason Lipshutz of Billboard called the film "a work of overflowing, era-traversing passion" and called the climax of the film "pure bliss". Under the Gun took issue with the "somewhat nonsensical" narration throughout the film, but said as a whole the film was "certainly something special". Similarly, Jimmy So of The Daily Beast also criticized the film's narration and compared it to "a campy arthouse movie" and described Del Rey's videos to this point as being "starved of creativity". In contrast, James Caterino of Examiner gave the film a 5-star review writing "The imagery is breathtaking and the voice-over narration so jam-packed with poetic prose that it sears into the soul... She is an artistic force who never fails to fascinate—and to make us feel". In a slightly more critical but equally optimistic review, Sal Cinquemani of Slant added "It's obvious from the big bang that opens the film that Del Rey and Mandler have zero interest in subtlety, but interestingly, Del Rey doesn't position herself among the film's icons of Americana the way, say, Kanye West or Lady Gaga might. Instead, her work continues to serve as both a tribute to an imagined past and a critique of contemporary pop culture".

== Soundtrack ==
Tropico

EP / soundtrack by Lana Del Rey
- Released: December 6, 2013
- Recorded: 2012
- Length: 38:55
- Labels: Polydor; Interscope
- Producers: Rick Nowels; Dan Heath; Tim Larcombe; Emile Haynie

Lana Del Rey chronology
Born to Die: The Paradise Edition (2012)	Tropico (2013)	Ultraviolence (2014)

The film is set to three songs of Del Rey's own songs: "Body Electric", "Gods & Monsters", and "Bel Air". The songs are taken from Del Rey's extended play Paradise (2012), which was also reissued with her second album Born to Die (2012) as Born to Die: The Paradise Edition in 2012. Del Rey released the songs featured in the film as a short EP, titled after the film. Tropico was released digitally on December 6, 2013 through Polydor and Interscope Records, featuring the songs, as well as the full length film.

=== Track listing ===
Tropico
No.	Title	Writer(s)	Producer(s)	Length
1.	"Body Electric"	Lana Del Rey; Rick Nowels	Nowels; Dan Heath	3:53
2.	"Gods & Monsters"	Del Rey; Tim Larcombe	Larcombe; Emile Haynie	3:57
3.	"Bel Air"	Del Rey; Heath	Heath	3:57
4.	"Tropico film"	Del Rey		27:08
Total length:				38:55

== See also ==
- Art film
- List of films featuring extraterrestrials
- List of films based on the Bible
- Lana Del Rey videography
