= Shaun Ross =

Shaun Ross may refer to:

- Shaun Ross (musician), American bassist
- Shaun Ross (model), American model
