= Cola (Lana Del Rey song) =

Song by Lana Del Rey

from the EP Paradise
- Released: November 9, 2012
- Studio: The Green Building (Santa Monica, CA)
- Genre: Art pop
- Length: 4:20
- Label: Interscope; Polydor
- Songwriters: Elizabeth Grant; Rick Nowels
- Producers: Rick Nowels; DK

Audio
- "Cola" on YouTube

"Cola" is a song by American singer and songwriter Lana Del Rey, taken from her third extended play, Paradise (2012), and the reissue of her second studio album, Born to Die: The Paradise Edition (2012). "Cola" first appeared in a teaser trailer posted to her official YouTube account as a snippet. The lyrics were considered controversial, causing major media outlets to respond.

== Background ==
"Cola"
The controversial "my pussy tastes like Pepsi-Cola" line in "Cola" occurs within the first few seconds of the song.

"Cola" has been described as a "gritty art pop" song. It was written by Del Rey and Rick Nowels, with Del Rey writing lyrics for the song. When Del Rey was asked about the origin of the lyrics, she explained: "My [then]-boyfriend is Scottish; he deems American girls very exotic. He once told me, 'You American girls walk around as if your pussies tasted like Pepsi-Cola, as if you'd wrap yourself into an American flag to sleep.' He deems us all very patriotic." It was produced by Nowels, with co-production handled by the production group DK. The arrangement consists of drum machines programmed by Kieron Menzies, who was also recording engineer, real drums performed by Devrim Karaoglu and Nowels, keyboards, Juno bass and acoustic guitar also played by Nowels, slide guitar performed by Tim Pierce, and strings, glockenspiel, brass, organ, electric guitar, piano and synthesizers played by Patrick Warren. The song was recorded at the Green Building in Santa Monica, with Chris Garcia and Jordan Stilwell doing additional recording. John Davis mastered the track at Metropolis Mastering in London. The song was at one stage referred to under the title of "Pussy" according to registrations at the American Society of Composers, Authors and Publishers (ASCAP) and Harry Fox Agency.

Following the release of "Ride" on September 25, 2012, Del Rey uploaded a trailer containing snippets of the songs from the new Paradise EP and Paradise Edition of Born to Die. In the clip, she sings, "My pussy tastes like Pepsi-Cola/My eyes are wide like cherry pies." In the trailer and first edition of the new track listing, "Cola" is referred to under its alternative title of "Pussy". Yet on the final versions of the Paradise EP and Born to Die: The Paradise Edition it is listed as only "Cola". On November 14, 2012, Digital Spy announced that Del Rey would be releasing the song as the EP's second single. Defending the track, she said that her record label had reservations about releasing it.

After Harvey Weinstein's sexual harassment and assault allegations gained widespread public notoriety in 2017, there was some speculation that the lyric "Harvey's in the sky with diamonds" was a reference to Weinstein's alleged illicit sexual activities involving female stars. In response, Del Rey cut the song from her setlist on her LA to the Moon Tour, stating she did have "a Harvey Weinstein/Harry Winston-type of character in mind" when she wrote the song.

== Critical reception ==
"Cola" received polarized reviews. New Zealand website Stuff wrote "is-she-serious?" as reaction to the lyrics included on "Cola". Hindustan Times criticized the song snippet, saying it proved she was running out of ideas and that the song sounded strangely similar to the other album tracks. Robert Copsey of Digital Spy noted that the hooks on "Cola" were polished, but did not compromise Del Rey's bold image. Noticing how the other tracks on Paradise sound rhythmically similar, Slant Magazine said: "Cola" is the opposite, pushing Del Rey's pop-art take on signifier-addled femme fatality too far into the realm of cheekiness, but also shattering a persona that already exists inside a hall of mirrors."

== Commercial performance ==
The song first charted in Ireland, landing at number 99 before the single's official release date was even announced. The song debuted on the United Kingdom singles chart at number 120 in the week ending on 18 November 2012. With the debut of Paradise, various tracks on the EP charted on Billboard's Hot Rock Songs chart, among them was "Cola", ranking at 22—her highest performance on that chart at the time. Just below "Cola" was "American" at 29 and "Ride" at 30.

=== Weekly charts ===
Chart (2012)	Peak position
France (SNEP)	71
Ireland (Irish Singles Chart)	99
UK Singles (OCC)	120
US Hot Rock Songs (Billboard)	22

=== Certifications ===
Region	Certification	Certified units/sales
Australia (ARIA)	Gold	35,000^{‡}
United Kingdom (BPI)	Silver	200,000^{‡}
United States (RIAA)	Gold	500,000^{‡}
^{‡} Sales+streaming figures based on certification alone.
