= Paradise (Lana Del Rey EP) =

2012 EP by Lana Del Rey

EP by Lana Del Rey
- Released: November 9, 2012
- Recorded: 2012
- Studios: Electric Lemon; Sarm West (London); Shangri-La (Malibu); The Green Building (Santa Monica, California); The Square (London); Westlake (Los Angeles)
- Genres: Baroque pop; trip hop
- Length: 33:07
- Labels: Polydor; Interscope
- Producers: Emile Haynie; Rick Nowels; Dan Heath; Rick Rubin

Lana Del Rey chronology
Born to Die (2012)	Paradise (2012)	Born to Die: The Paradise Edition (2012)

Singles from Paradise
- 1. "Ride" Released: September 25, 2012

Paradise is the third extended play (EP) by American singer-songwriter Lana Del Rey. It was released on November 9, 2012, in Australasia and November 11, 2012, worldwide by Polydor and Interscope. It was additionally packaged with the reissue of her second studio album, Born to Die (2012), titled Born to Die: The Paradise Edition. Grant enlisted collaborators including producers Rick Nowels, Justin Parker and Rick Rubin. The EP's sound has been described as baroque pop and trip hop.

Upon its release, Paradise received generally favorable reviews from music critics. The extended play debuted at No. 10 on the US Billboard 200 with first-week sales of 67,000 copies. It also debuted at No. 10 on the Canadian Albums Chart and peaked within the top five of various other Billboard charts. In Europe, the EP charted within top 10 in Flanders and Poland as well as within the top 20 in Wallonia and the Netherlands.

The EP's lead single was the ballad "Ride", which became a modest hit in the United States, Switzerland, Ireland and France and reached the top 10 in Russia. "Blue Velvet" (a cover of the popular 1950s track) and "Burning Desire" were released as promotional singles. Music videos for "Ride", "Blue Velvet", "Bel Air" and "Burning Desire" were posted to Vevo and YouTube to help promote the EP.

In December 2013, Del Rey released the Anthony Mandler-directed Tropico, a short film that includes the songs "Body Electric", "Gods & Monsters" and "Bel Air". That same month, an EP of the same name was made available for digital purchase, containing the film along with the three aforementioned songs. In 2014, Paradise was nominated for Best Pop Vocal Album at the 56th Annual Grammy Awards.

== Background ==
"Ride"
"Ride" serves as the EP's first single.

In an interview with RTVE on June 15, 2012, Del Rey announced that she had been working on a new album due in November, and that five tracks had already been written, two of them being "Young and Beautiful" and "Gods and Monsters", and another track titled "Body Electric", which was performed and announced as one of her songs at BBC Radio 1's Hackney Weekend. In an interview with Tim Blackwell for radio station Nova 100 in Melbourne, Australia, Del Rey added that her upcoming November release would not be a new album, but more like an EP, which she described as the "Paradise Edition" of Born to Die. Del Rey stated that the new release would contain approximately seven new songs.

Paradise was released on November 12, 2012, in the UK and one day later in the US. The prior album's re-release, titled Born to Die: The Paradise Edition, was available for pre-order offering an immediate download of "Burning Desire" in some countries. The nine tracks were issued as a stand-alone CD or vinyl EP titled Paradise, in a two-disc set including the original Born to Die album tracks, as well as in a deluxe box set including both the album and the EP, a remix CD including eight remixes of songs from Born to Die, a DVD with six music videos and a two-track vinyl 7" single of "Blue Velvet". Two remixes of Blue Velvet were included on the special edition of Paradise exclusively at Target stores, however the remixes were not included on Born to Die: The Paradise Edition.

== Promotion ==
On the day of "Ride"'s release as the EP's first single, Del Rey uploaded a teaser trailer to video-hosting website YouTube, that contained snippets of each track on Born to Die: The Paradise Edition. To promote the album, two promotional singles were also released, a cover version of "Blue Velvet" and "Burning Desire". "Blue Velvet" was used in a television commercial for H&M. "Burning Desire", the album's second promotional single, was used to promote the Jaguar F-Type model; at a promotional concert, Del Rey sang the song, wearing red lipstick, because the model features a built-in lipstick holder. Unlike in the US. where it was released as an EP, Paradise was released in the United Kingdom as a re-release of Born to Die. The song served as the soundtrack for a short film called Desire, directed by Ridley Scott and starring Damian Lewis. A promotional video for "Burning Desire" appeared online on Valentine's Day 2013, featuring Del Rey as her usual lounge singer persona, interspersed with snippets of the Jaguar F-Type. Directed by Ridley Scott, the video was filmed in the Rivoli Ballroom in London's South end.

On November 30, 2012, Del Rey was a musical guest on Later... with Jools Holland and performed her current single, "Ride".

=== Singles ===
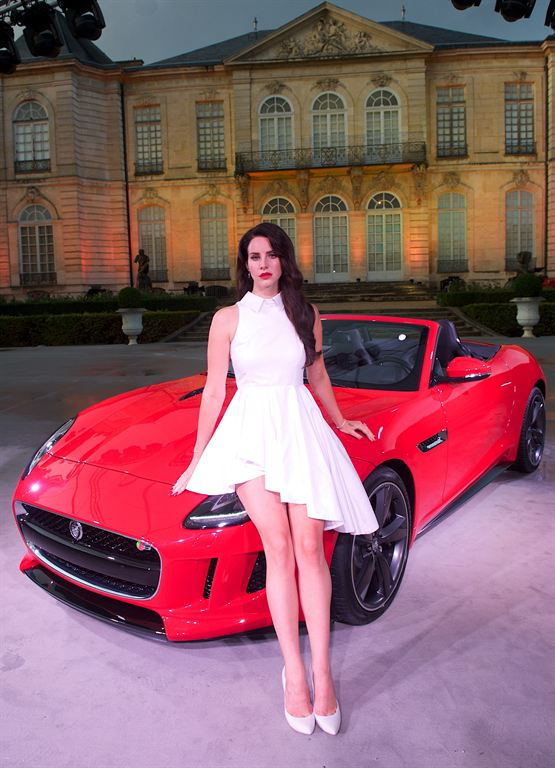
Del Rey appearing in a photoshoot for the Jaguar F-Type automobile in 2012, for which "Burning Desire" served as a promotional single for the EP.

On September 13, 2012, the lead single of Paradise was confirmed to be "Ride", the accompanying music video being shot in Las Vegas, Nevada. It was eventually released for purchase on September 25, 2012. On October 10, Del Rey premiered the music video for "Ride" at the Aero Theatre in Santa Monica, California. On October 12, the music video for "Ride" was released online. Del Rey portrays a prostitute in the video, which the NME described as "not exactly empowering," and said might be seen as "anti-feminist". To further promote the single and album, an EP was released containing remixes of "Ride" by artists including Sohn, MJ Cole, Eli Escobar, 14th, Wes James and James Lavelle.

On September 19, the music video for "Blue Velvet" was released through H&M. On September 20, 2012, "Blue Velvet" was made available for purchase via digital download as the first promotional single from the EP. People who preordered the EP received an immediate download of "Burning Desire". On February 14, 2013, the music video for "Burning Desire" was released. The song was made available for purchase via digital download on March 19, 2013, as the EP's second and final promo single.

=== Other songs ===
The third single from Paradise and the eighth single overall from Born to Die, was announced as "Cola" on November 14, 2012. However, a release date for the single never materialized. Because the description of the trailer listed the song "Cola" as "Pussy", it led to speculation about the song being titled "Pussy" or having a subtitle of that name, but no alternate titles were confirmed, and the official iTunes preorder did not acknowledge any alternate title. "Fresh" and "is-she-serious?" have been some of the reactions to the profane lyrics included on "Cola". Hindustan Times criticized the song snippet, saying it proved she was running out of ideas and that her songs all sounded strangely similar. When asked about the origin of the lyrics to "Cola", Del Rey said: "I have a Scottish boyfriend, and that's just what he says!" Defending the track, she said that her record label had reservations about releasing it.

The song "Body Electric" alludes to Walt Whitman in the lyric, "Whitman is my daddy". The song's chorus of "I sing the body electric" is a direct reference to his poem "I Sing the Body Electric". Del Rey had previously cited Whitman as an inspiration, recalling his chapbook Leaves of Grass as instrumental to her songwriting.

Originally appearing on Del Rey's first EP, Kill Kill, and her debut album, Lana Del Ray, "Yayo" was re-recorded for inclusion on Paradise.

A promotional video for the closing track, "Bel Air", was released on November 8, 2012. The video featured outtakes from the "Summertime Sadness" music video. In the song, Del Rey sings, "Roses, Bel Air, take me there/ I’ve been waiting to meet you/ Palm trees, in the light, I can see, late at night/ Darling I’m willing to greet you/ Come to me, baby." Rolling Stone praised the shift in persona that Del Rey exhibited in the video, noting a significant difference from her usual Americana lounge singer, Jackie O and biker chick alter egos.

=== Film ===
Alongside Paradise, Del Rey released a short film titled Tropico that featured the songs "Body Electric", "Gods and Monsters" and "Bel Air". Tropico was filmed in late June 2013; it was directed by Anthony Mandler, who also directed Del Rey's earlier music videos for "National Anthem" and "Ride". Via social media platforms, Del Rey released several promotional images for the film, one depicting Del Rey in a wimple reminiscent of Mary, Mother of Jesus and another with Del Rey holding a snake and posing as Eve, the biblical wife of Adam from Genesis. In August 2013, Del announced on Twitter that the film would have two premieres, one at the Hollywood Forever Cemetery in Los Angeles and another in an unspecified location in New York; she referred to the short film as a "farewell". Critics noted that this contradicted other claims by Del Rey that she would release a third studio album, coinciding with a demo of the song "Black Beauty" leaking online. On November 22, 2013, an official trailer for Tropico was released; at the end of the trailer, it was announced that the film would be uploaded to Del Rey's official Vevo account on December 5. On December 3, she announced on Facebook and Twitter that Tropico would be screened at the Cinerama Dome in Hollywood, California on December 4 prior to its Vevo release.

== Critical reception ==
Professional ratings
Aggregate scores
Source	Rating
Metacritic	64/100
Review scores
Source	Rating
AllMusic	2.5/5 stars
American Songwriter	3.5/5 stars
Drowned in Sound	8/10
Rolling Stone	3/5 stars
Slant Magazine	3/5 stars
Sputnikmusic	3.5/5
Tiny Mix Tapes	3/5 stars

Paradise received generally positive reviews from contemporary critics. At Metacritic, which assigns a normalized rating out of 100 to reviews from mainstream critics, the EP has received an average score of 64, based on 9 reviews indicating "generally favorable reviews". Gil Kaufman of MTV wrote that "[the reissue] is as mellow and languorous... as she was on her debut." On the snippet video, he said, "...the new songs gives a peek at the gangster Nancy Sinatra's ongoing fascination with a sleepy, seductive sound and lyrics that mix old-fashion girl group obsession with sometimes profane, shocking new-school swagger." Stuff said that the song titles were predictably poker-faced. "Ride" received widely positive reviews, with the only criticism focused on the unrealistic cover art and coy song title. Contactmusic.com noticed that the track adhered to Del Rey's trademark sound, stating that the notion of her even having a trademark after one commercially successful album indicates that "we haven't seen the last of her just yet". Of the production itself, it was said that "Ride" was more accomplished than Del Rey's previous endeavors, with the strengths of the track outshining the flaws. The reviewer concluded by saying, "All that doe-eyed "you can be my full-time daddy / baby" shtick is going to start getting a little tired pretty soon, though, we reckon."

NME said that the most significant lyric in "Ride" read, "I'm tired of feeling like I'm fucking crazy". Pitchfork agreed, saying the aforementioned lyric was a rare moment of raw emotion by Del Rey. Billboard wrote: "Ride' is a long, dreamy ballad that swells into full view during the chorus, when the singer declares, 'Been trying' hard not to get into trouble/But I, I've got a war in my mind… so I just ride." MTV called "Ride" a "slow burn" and "as mellow and languorous...as on her debut." Another MTV review said: "On 'Ride,' Rey sings what she knows best: loneliness, some daddy issues and day-drinking. All of this is probably a metaphor for something, but honestly, we’re still trying to figure out what those 'Born To Die' tigers mean." Cameron Matthew of Spinner noted that Del Rey "amped up on the smokey vocals" with "Ride". Canada.com reviewer Leah Collins called "Bel Air" an Enya-channeled, eerie waltz.

Conversely, The Huffington Post called both "Bel Air" and "Yayo" "filler tracks". Disagreeing with this position, Carl Williot of Idolator said that "Yayo" should have been a single. Calling it Del Rey's most interesting song to date, Williot compared the narration on "Yayo" to the plight of Anna Nicole Smith and said it was "woozy" and "burlesque". As a whole, Williot noted the theme between Born to Die and Paradise shifted from infantilization on the former to sexualization on the EP; songs such as "Burning Desire" and "Ride" were decisively more mature than tracks like "Video Games" from the singer's mainstream debut. Closing the review, Williot said the EP was best listened to "while wearing formal cocktail attire that has become slightly rumpled following some sort of intense argument and/or sexual dalliance." John Bush of AllMusic commented that the EP kept the glacial string arrangements and slow drums that characterized the cinematic atmosphere of Born to Die, while improving in terms of vocals. However, Bush panned the songwriting and lyrical content of Paradise. He singled out the lyrics of "Body Electric" ("Elvis is my daddy/ Marilyn's my mother/ Jesus is my bestest friend/ We get crazy every Friday night/ Drop It Like It's Hot in the pale moonlight") as being "cliché[d]" and "babyish", a trend pervading the entire album. On a positive note, Bush proposed that "Blue Velvet" proved Del Rey was more than capable of performing vocally when given tasteful content. Bush concluded that, overall, Del Rey had lyrically remained in stasis, with the album serving as fodder for her hype and image. According to Bush, the album's significance was embodied by a simile from "Gods and Monsters": "Like a groupie incognito posing as a real singer, life imitates art." Los Angeles Times called the EP "surprisingly strong". Digital Spy said:

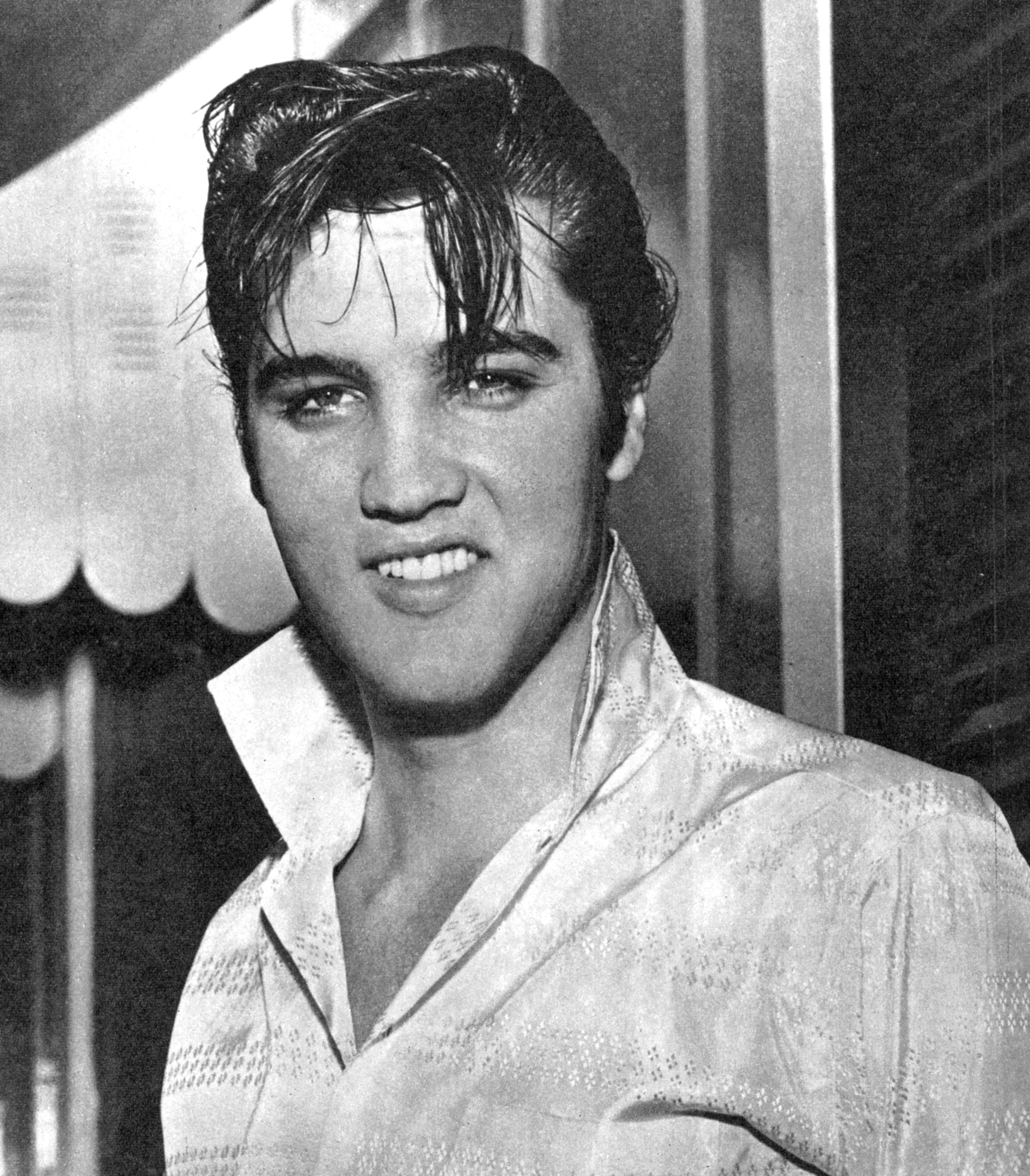
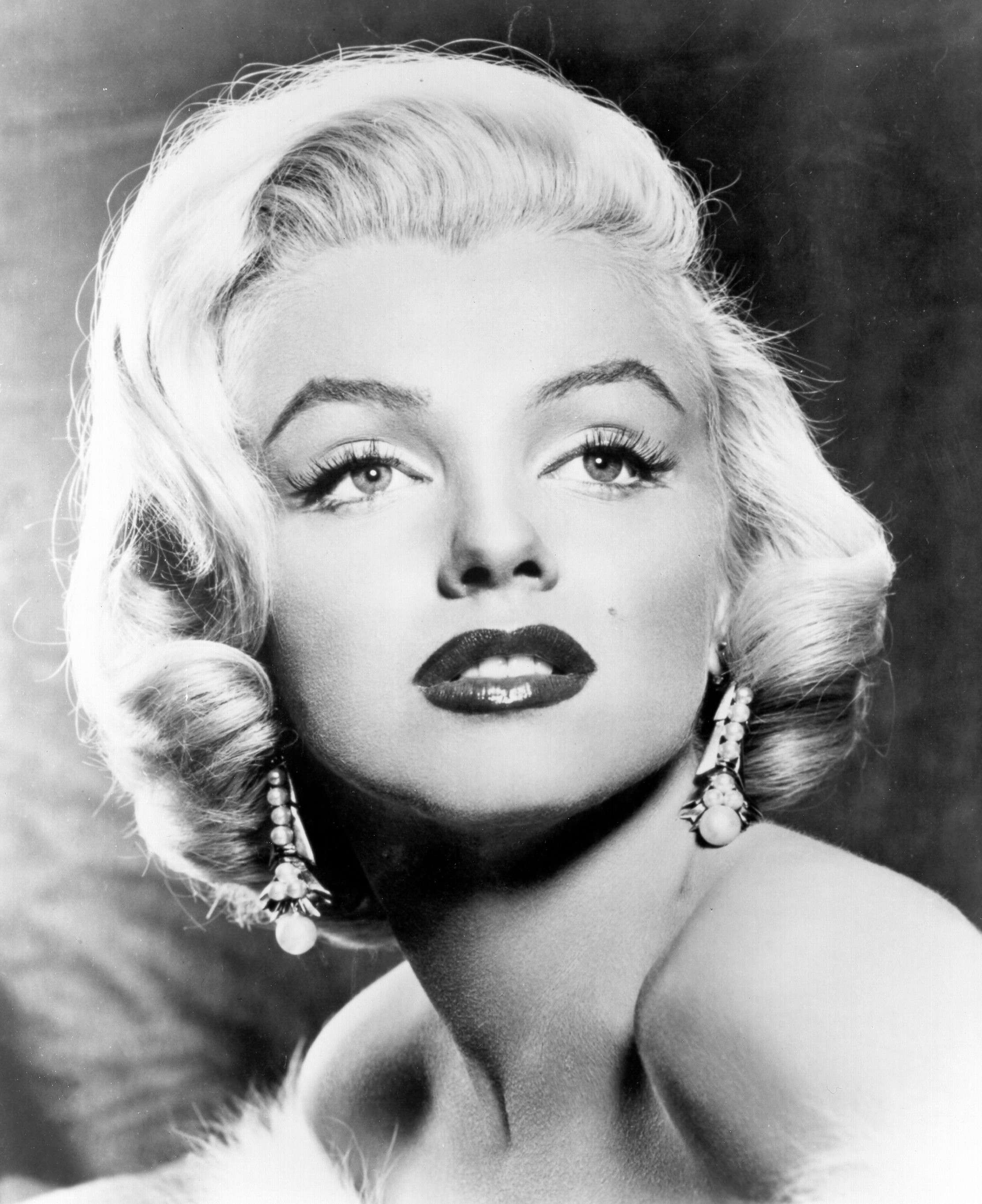
In "Body Electric", Del Rey lends tribute to both Elvis Presley (left) and Marilyn Monroe (right). Music reviewer Carl Williot considered the shout-out clichéd, while other reviewers praised the songwriting.

Current single "Ride" finds her wearing The Boss's influence on her sleeve most plainly with its galloping verses and sweeping melody, albeit delivered with Lana's '50s-styled Hollywood demeanour. Elsewhere, there's more talk of bad boys, cherry pie and other old fashioned glamourisms much like its parent album, but there's still progression to be found. The multiple hooks in "Cola" feel polished without compromising her rebellious nature (she opens it with the line: "My pussy tastes like Pepsi-Cola"), while the booming "Body Electric" sees her revisiting her Marilyn Monroe persona with more believable results than previous attempts. She treads close to being kooky for the sake of kooky on "Yayo", but when she gets it right in the case of "Bel Air" – a snowy, Tim Burton-inspired ballad – Lana proves there's plenty more to be excited for on album two.

Pointing to "Blue Velvet" and "Yayo" as the weaker songs, LGBT lifestyle magazine So So Gay analyzed Paradise as a whole: "The existing themes, stunning musicality, and lyrical strength of the original are complimented [sic] by a series of new tracks that give the listener 'more of the same'." Slant Magazine said the EP could not live up to Born to Die, with tracks "Gods and Monsters" and "Burning Desire" standing in its shadow, and termed it a "grubby cash grab". Drowned in Sound writer David Edwards concurred, due to the release's proximity to the Christmas holiday. Rolling Stone called the album "conceptually sharp". Billboard praised the album's allusions to David Lynch, adding, "her vintage 60s charm just might kill you." Applauding Del Rey's rising stardom, The Daily Record celebrated the EP's commentary on the 2010s zeitgeist. The Prophet Blog wrote: "Paradise, sounds like the record she was always meant to make — not the one she had to. Whereas Born to Die was self-conscious and chart hungry, Paradise allows Lana the freedom to get a little more daring and fully indulge in her love of David Lynch."

In January 2013, Nashville-based producer/singer-songwriter Shane Tutmarc released a cover of Ride. Nashville Scene described it as, "a rad little bit of Americana-stalgia, and to be perfectly honest, I vastly prefer Tutmarc's version of "Ride" over Del Rey's — it's a gauzy, dreamy take on a tune that, in Tutmarc's hands, has a pleasant and memorable melody."

== Commercial performance ==
Paradise debuted at No. 10 on the Billboard 200, selling 67,000 copies in its first week. It has since sold over 332,000 copies in the US.

== Track listing ==
Paradise track listing
No.	Title	Writer(s)	Producer(s)	Length
1.	"Ride"	Elizabeth Grant; Justin Parker	Rick Rubin	4:49
2.	"American"	Grant; Rick Nowels; Emile Haynie	Nowels; Haynie (co.)	4:08
3.	"Cola"	Grant; Nowels	Nowels; DK (co.)	4:20
4.	"Body Electric"	Grant; Nowels	Nowels; Dan Heath	3:53
5.	"Blue Velvet"	Lee Morris; Bernie Wayne	Haynie	2:38
6.	"Gods & Monsters"	Grant; Tim Larcombe	Larcombe; Haynie (add.)	3:57
7.	"Yayo"	Grant	Heath; Haynie	5:21
8.	"Bel Air"	Grant; Heath	Heath	3:57
Total length:				33:07

iTunes Store bonus track
No.	Title	Writer(s)	Producer(s)	Length
9.	"Burning Desire"	Grant; Parker	Haynie	3:51
Total length:				36:58

=== Notes ===
- The EP includes the short film Tropico
- Target edition icludes the Penguin Prison Remix and Lindstrøm Remix of "Blue Velvet".

== Personnel ==
Credits adapted from the liner notes of Paradise.

Performance credits

- Lana Del Rey – vocals (all tracks); backing vocals (track 7)

Instruments

- James Gadson – drums (track 1)
- Emile Haynie – drums (track 2, 7); additional keyboard (track 7)
- Dan Heath – percussion (track 4); horns (track 6); keyboard (track 7); strings (tracks 7, 8); piano (track 8)
- Devrim Karaoglu – drums (track 3)
- Jason Lader – bass guitar (track 1)
- Tim Larcombe – keyboards, guitar, drums (track 6)
- The Larry Gold Orchestra – strings (track 5)
- Songa Lee – violin (tracks 1, 8)
- Kieron Menzies – drum programming (track 3)
- Rick Nowels – synthesizer (track 2); keyboard (tracks 2, 3); bass guitar, acoustic guitar, drums (track 3); piano, mellotron, strings (track 4)
- Tim Pierce – electric guitar (track 2); slide guitar (tracks 3, 4)
- Zac Rae – piano, keyboard (track 1)
- Kathleen Sloan – violin (tracks 1, 8)
- Patrick Warren – electric guitar, synthesizer, piano (tracks 2, 3, 4); strings, glockenspiel, brass (track 3); organ (tracks 3, 4); dulcitone, bells, optigon, mellotron (track 4)

Technical and production

- Graham Archer – vocal engineering (track 7)
- Ben Baptie – mixing assistant (track 5)
- Spencer Burgess Jr. – recording assistant (track 5)
- Nikki Calvert – engineering (track 8)
- Jeremy Cochise Ball – mixing (track 7)
- John Davis – mastering (tracks 1, 2, 3, 4, 5, 6, 7, 8)
- DK – co-production (track 3)
- Tom Elmhirst – mixing (track 5)
- Chris Garcia – additional recording (tracks 2, 3); recording (track 4)
- Larry Gold – string arrangements (track 5)
- Emile Haynie – co-production (track 2); production (tracks 5, 7); additional production (track 6)
- Dan Heath – string arrangements (tracks 1, 6); orchestral arrangements (tracks 2, 4); production (tracks 4, 7, 8); engineering (track 8)
- Jason Lader – recording (track 1)
- Tim Larcombe – production (track 6)
- Eric Lynn – recording assistant (track 1)
- Kieron Menzies – recording, mixing (tracks 2, 3, 4)
- Rick Nowels – production (tracks 2, 3, 4)
- Sean Oakley – recording assistant (track 1)
- Robert Orton – mixing (track 6)
- Tucker Robinson – string recording (track 1); engineering (track 8)
- Jeff Rothschild – mixing (track 8)
- Rick Rubin – production (track 1)
- Andrew Scheps – mixing (track 1)
- Peter Stanislaus – mixing (track 8)
- Jordan Stilwell – additional recording (tracks 2, 3)

== Charts ==
=== Weekly charts ===
Chart (2012–2014)	Peak position
Australian Albums (ARIA)	19
Canadian Albums (Billboard)	10
New Zealand Albums (RMNZ)	19
US Billboard 200	10
US Top Rock Albums (Billboard)	4
US Top Alternative Albums (Billboard)	4
US Vinyl Albums (Billboard)	10

=== Year-end charts ===
Chart (2013)	Position
US Billboard 200	115
US Top Rock Albums (Billboard)	28

== Certifications ==
Region	Certification	Certified units/sales
Australia (ARIA)	Platinum	70,000^{^}
France (SNEP)	Gold	50,000^{*}
^{*} Sales figures based on certification alone.^{^} Shipments figures based on certification alone.

== Release history ==
Region	Date	Format	Catalog	Label	Ref.
Australia	November 9, 2012	CD	3720468	Universal Music	
United States	November 13, 2012	CD; digital download; LP	—N/a	Interscope	
