= I Sing the Body Electric =

Poem by Walter Whitman

"I Sing the Body Electric" is a poem by Walt Whitman from his 1855 collection Leaves of Grass. The poem is divided into nine sections, each celebrating a different aspect of human physicality.

Its original publication, like the other poems in Leaves of Grass, did not have a title. In fact, the line "I sing the body electric" was not added until the 1867 edition. At the time, electric was not yet a commonly used term.

== In popular culture ==
- "I Sing the Body Electric" was used by author Ray Bradbury as the title of both a 1969 short story and the book it appeared in.
- Prior to his book, Bradbury used the title of "I Sing the Body Electric" for a 1962 episode he wrote for The Twilight Zone.
- I Sing the Body Electric was the second album released by the Jazz Fusion band Weather Report in 1972.
- In the 1980 film Fame, the students sing a song called "I Sing the Body Electric", inspired by this poem, at their graduation ceremony.
- "Body Electric" is a song by The Sisters of Mercy released in 1982 and appearing on the compilation album Some Girls Wander By Mistake.
- The song "The Body Electric" appears on the album Grace Under Pressure by the Canadian progressive rock group Rush released April 12, 1984.
- In the 1988 movie Bull Durham, Susan Sarandon's character reads the poem "I Sing the Body Electric" to Tim Robbins' character.
- In the 1988 book The Satanic Verses, the poem is alluded to on page 405 when a character (Joshi) writes a poem called "I sing the Body Eclectic".
- The 1995 book I Sing the Body Electronic, by Fred Moody, chronicles Microsoft's push into multimedia.
- We Sing the Body Electric is the title of the debut album by American hardcore band Sincebyman.
- American singer Lana Del Rey references Walt Whitman and Leaves of Grass in her song "Body Electric", from her EP Paradise (2012). She also quotes some verses from the poem in her short film Tropico (2013).
- We Sing the Body Electric is the title of a live EP by Australian post-rock band Sleepmakeswaves.
- The group Miracle Musical released the song "The Mind Electric" on the album Hawaii: Part II (2012).
- Icarus released the album I Tweet the Birdy Electric in 2004.
- "Sing the Body Electric" is a song by Astrid Williamson from the album Here Come the Vikings.
- "Body Electric", a 2023–2024 audio investigative reporting series from National Public Radio examining the relationship between technology and the human body.
