= Rivoli Ballroom =

1950s ballroom in London

Coordinates: 51.45523°N 0.03717°W

- The Rivoli Ballroom in 2026
- Interactive map of Rivoli Ballroom
- Former names: Crofton Park Picture Palace
- Address: 350 Brockley Road
- Location: Crofton Park, London
- Owner: Bill Mannix
- Capacity: 700

Listed Building – Grade II
- Official name: Rivoli Ballroom
- Designated: 21 December 2007
- Reference no.: 1392344
- Type: Dance hall
- Event: Art Deco

Construction
- Opened: 12 July 1913
- Renovated: 1957–1959
- Expanded: 26 December 1959

Website
- Official website

The Rivoli Ballroom is an 1950s ballroom in London, England. It has original decor and interior fittings, including red velvet, flock wallpaper, chandeliers, glitter balls and oversized Chinese lanterns.

The venue is used as a film location and plays host to dance and musical events.

== History ==
The current building was originally the Crofton Park Picture Palace which opened in July 1913. It was designed by Henley Attwater with a simple barrel-vaulted auditorium. It became The Rivoli Cinema in 1929.

The last film there was shown on 2 March 1957 after which the building was converted to a dance hall by local businessman Leonard Tomlin. It reopened as The Rivoli on Boxing Day, 1959 with a large sprung dance floor of Canadian maple. Further improvements were made with the addition of a Member's Bar in 1960.

On 21 December 2007, the building was granted Grade II-listed status by English Heritage in response to press concern about a possible sale, which might have led to its closure and demolition.

The venue was listed due to its special architectural interest, special historic interest and a rare surviving example of a once common conversion of an early 20th-century cinema to a ballroom.

Owner Bill Mannix, who had owned and preserved the venue for over 40 years, (since the 1980's) planned to sell the building in 2008. Mannix died in 2025, and the building is now operated by his granddaughter, Jayne Williams.

== Style ==
=== Exterior ===
Exterior of the ballroom at night 2006

The Brockley Road frontage is based on an Art Deco elevation which dates from 1931. A broad flight of steps passes into a deep-recessed central foyer. Pilasters, topped with plasterwork urns, terminate the elevation and the frontage currently features two signs reading 'Dancing' and 'Tonight'.

=== Interior ===
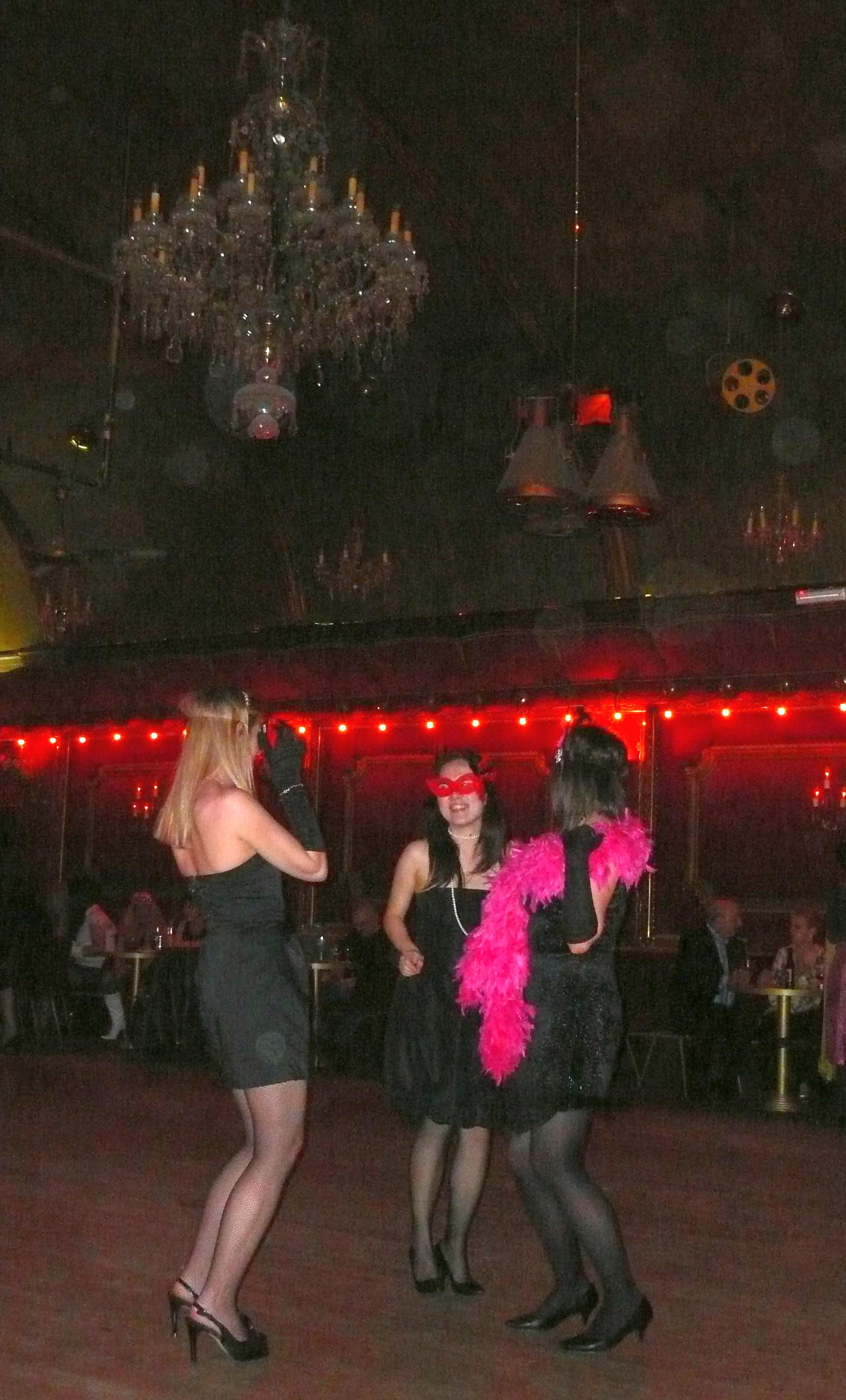
The interior of the Rivoli

The ballroom comprises a mix of neoclassical, Deco and oriental motifs set within a decorative scheme mainly dating from the 1950s. The main auditorium ceiling survives from the earlier cinema. From the off-street entrance steps a small foyer is reached featuring a raked floor and Deco-style marquetry panelling. The main motif is a geometric composition of intersecting curves in a shape with broad segmental top, tapering centre and curved base. The design is accentuated through the use of dark wood inlay and a diamond shape in the centre is picked out in glass or mirror. Although 1920s in inspiration, it is characteristic of the 1950s fashion for reviving the Deco aesthetic that had been unwillingly abandoned with the onset of WWII.

The foyer leads directly into the ballroom, a large auditorium with a shallow barrel-vaulted ceiling, complete with raised viewing dais, stage, proscenium, fixed banquettes and a sprung maple dance floor. The decorative scheme is red velour padded walls with gilt picture-frame style panels and decorated pilasters, scallop-shaped lights, a red velour pelmet, French chandeliers and Chinese lanterns.

Either side of the ballroom are two bars, running the length of the hall, one dating 1958 and the other of 1960. The right hand bar of 1958 features booths and tables with leather upholstery arranged similar to a railway-carriage. The bar at the end of the room has a tiled front of Arabesque interlaced patterns. Lighting is provided by saucer-shaped lamps decorated with a mixture of Georgian and oriental patterns. The panelling motif established in the foyer is continued on various doors, to the ladies powder room and the gentleman's cloakroom for example, and there is also signage throughout the building some of which, to the 'Buffet' for example, appears to be contemporary with the late 1950s refurbishment.

There is a second function room, dating from the late twentieth century, with a neoclassical decorative scheme with gilded Corinthian capitals, a modillion cornice and Adam-esque garlands along the beams which support a ceiling adorned with photographs of Old Master paintings.

== Notable gigs ==
A jive taking place in the ballroom, pictured in 2008

Florence and the Machine, The White Stripes, and Kings of Leon have all performed at the ballroom.

In March 2015, Noel Gallagher played a 'secret gig' for Absolute Radio, promoting his second solo album Chasing Yesterday.

== Use in media ==
=== Music videos ===
The Rivoli Ballroom has found favour with pop video producers and style shoots – Tina Turner's 1984 "Private Dancer" video was shot there and rock band Oasis (2005), pop group S Club 7's "don't stop movin'", singers Charlotte Church and Martine McCutcheon, and fashion model Kate Moss are some glitterati to make use of the venue for shoots. It was used in the 1983 Elton John video for the song "I Guess That's Why They Call It the Blues".

The music video released for Lana Del Rey's promotional single "Burning Desire" was filmed at the Rivoli Ballroom by Ridley Scott in 2013.

Sophie Ellis-Bextor’s 2001 music video for "Murder on the Dancefloor" was filmed at the ballroom, as was the music video for "Freedom of the Night".

=== Film and television ===
The Rivoli Ballroom has been a location for a variety of films.

In 2001 scenes from the file Spy Game, in 2014, the ballroom was used for a flashback sequence shot in the 1940s for the superhero film Avengers: Age of Ultron. as well as featuring in Legend which released in 2015 (where it stood in for "Esmeralda’s Barn" a club the Kray twins owned). Scenes from the 2016 film, The Infiltrator were shot at the ballroom as well. The ballroom was also subsequently featured in the 2023 film Wonka.
