= Shaun Ross (model) =

American model, recording artist and actor (born 1991)

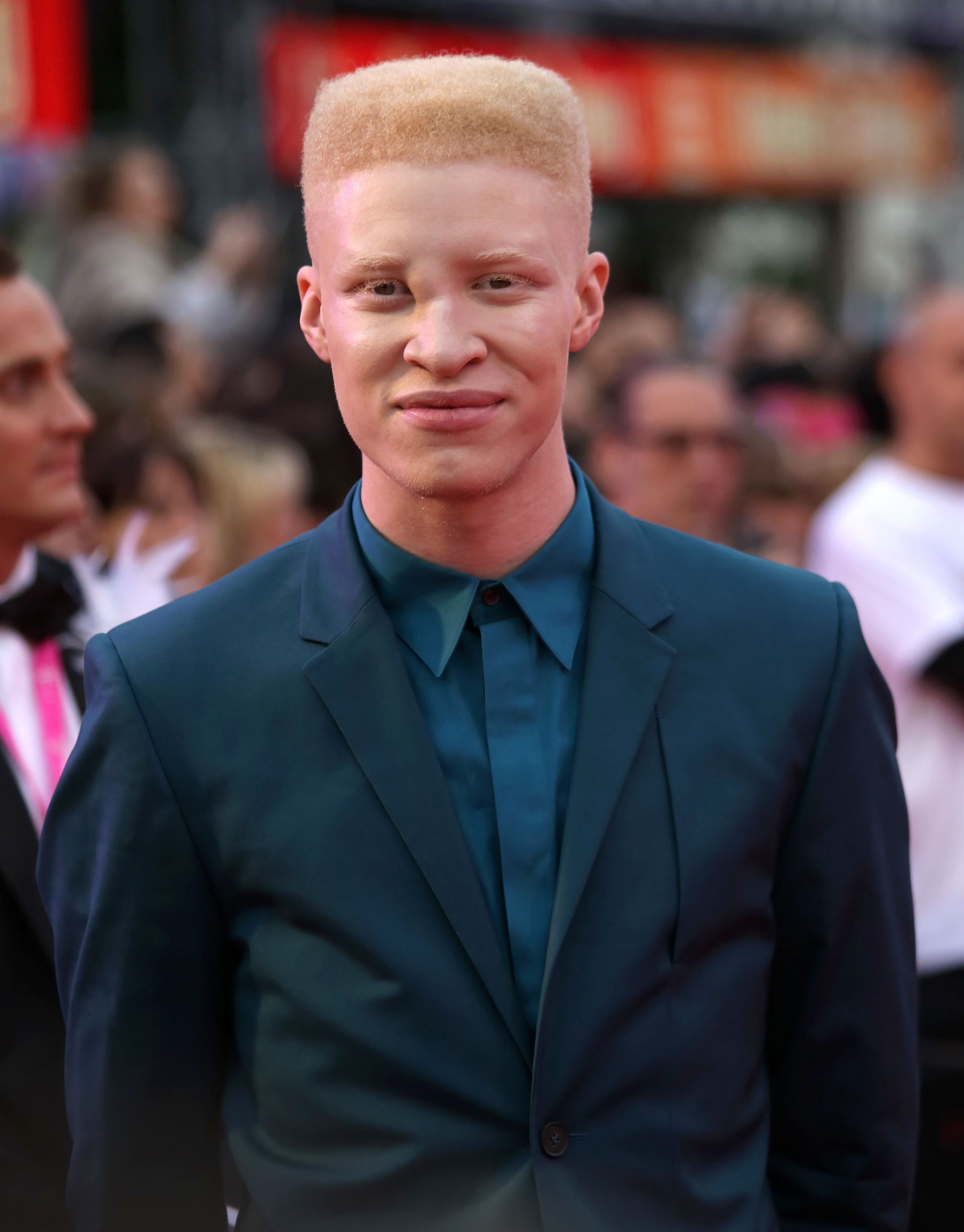
- Shaun Ross in 2014 at the Life Ball charity event
- Born: May 10, 1991 (age 35); New York City, United States
- Occupations: Fashion model; recording artist; actor
- Known for: The first African-American male model with albinism
- Website: www.shaunross.co

Shaun Ross (born May 10, 1991) is an American model, recording artist, and actor. He is known for his work in the fashion world as the first professional male model with the congenital disorder albinism. Ross has worked with various fashion designers, magazines and campaigns, including Givenchy, Alexander McQueen, Vogue, GQ, Nylon and others. In 2018, he collaborated with designer Nina Athanasiou for the "In My Skin" clothing line to bring awareness to albinism. He has also appeared in several videos from music artists, including Beyoncé's "Pretty Hurts", Lana Del Rey's short film Tropico, and Katy Perry's "E.T".

Ross released his debut single "Symmetry", featuring Lizzo on background vocals, in November 2017. He released the single "Chrysalis" in August 2018, and opened for singer ionnalee in Los Angeles. He made his first music festival appearance performing with What So Not at the Life Is Beautiful Music & Art Festival. In 2019, he performed at LA Pride. He performed his song "Good Vein" for the Recording Academy original performance series Press Play, and a cover of Cher's "Believe" for the Recording Academy's Reimagined series.

In 2021, Ross released his first full-length LP on JEX Records, entitled "SHIFT". Its second single, "You Care" was featured in HBO's "The Legend of the Underground", a documentary highlighting Nigerian legislation that discriminates against the LGBTQ community. In May 2021, Ross was the subject of a New York Times Style Section profile piece.

== Early life ==
Ross is of African descent. Born in the Bronx, when he was growing up, Ross dealt with much discrimination for being a person with albinism. He was bullied frequently by his peers, called names such as "Powder", "Wite-Out", and "Casper". After training at the Alvin Ailey School for five years, Ross was discovered on YouTube and crossed over to the fashion industry in 2008 at 16 years old.

== Career ==
At 16, he was represented by Djamee Models in New York City. He was also signed by AMCK Models London. In 2018, he collaborated with designer Nina Athanasiou for the "In My Skin" clothing line to bring awareness to albinism.

Ross has appeared in music videos, including Katy Perry's "E.T.", Beyoncé's "Party" and "Pretty Hurts", Gold Fields' "Dark Again", Issues' "Coma", two music videos from Steve Aoki's extended play 4OKI ("ILYSM" with Autoerotique and "Kids" with Morten), as well as Lana Del Rey's short film Tropico, Leona Lewis' "Fire Under My Feet", Duke Dumont's "Red Light Green Light", and Charli XCX's "Boys".

He released his debut single "Symmetry", featuring Lizzo on background vocals, in November 2017. In August 2018, he released the single "Chrysalis", and opened for singer ionnalee in Los Angeles. He made his first music festival appearance performing with Australian electronic artist What So Not at the Life Is Beautiful Music & Art Festival. In 2019, he performed at LA Pride. He later performed his song "Good Vein" for the Recording Academy original performance series Press Play, and a cover of Cher's "Believe" for the Recording Academy's Reimagined series.

== Personal life ==
Ross participates in the underground ballroom scene in New York and Los Angeles, where he often vogues as the west coaster father of the famed House of Ninja. He is openly gay, and announced his engagement to model and actor David Alan Madrick on August 10, 2022, via Instagram and People magazine.
