= Bel Air (Lana Del Rey song) =

Song by Lana Del Rey

from the EP Paradise and Tropico
- Released: November 9, 2012
- Recorded: 2012
- Studio: Electric Lemon Studios (Hollywood, CA); Westlake Recording Studios (Hollywood, CA)
- Genre: Baroque pop * Dream pop
- Length: 3:57
- Label: Interscope; Polydor
- Songwriters: Lana Del Rey; Dan Heath
- Producer: Heath

Audio
- "Bel Air" on YouTube

"Bel Air" is a song by American singer and songwriter Lana Del Rey. It appears on her third extended play, Paradise. Featuring clips from the "Summertime Sadness" music video, a promotional video for "Bel Air" was released to YouTube in early November 2012. The video has received much critical acclaim. After the release of Paradise, the song charted in the United Kingdom and France.

== Music video and composition ==
A promotional video for the closing track, "Bel Air", was released on November 8, 2012. Filmed by Kyle Newman, the video featured outtakes from the "Summertime Sadness" music video. Spinning amidst a smoky backdrop and flushed with monochromatic blues, greens, and violets, Del Rey is displayed as a celestial being. Although not depicted lip-synching in the video, Del Rey is heard singing the line: "Roses, Bel Air, take me there/ I’ve been waiting to meet you/ Palm trees, in the light, I can see, late at night/ Darling I’m willing to greet you/ Come to me, baby." Rolling Stone praised the shift in persona Del Rey exhibited in the ballad's video, noting a significant difference from her usual Americana lounge singer, First Lady Onassis-Kennedy, and biker chick alter egos. PopCrush reviewer Amy Sciarretto called the video "snoozy", "an artform", and drew comparisons between Del Rey's work and neo-noir films. AOL's Spinner said: "Here's how we imagine the pitch meeting going for Lana Del Rey's new "Bel Air" video. Director: Lana, can you stand around in smoke for a little while and occasionally look at a camera? Lana: Yes. Director: Brilliant!" MTV pointed out the obvious parallels the song title gained with the television program The Fresh Prince of Bel Air. Noting that Del Rey was "stunning" in the video for "Bel Air", Vibe said it would "...definitely keep the Lana-obsessed occupied for a few hours."

In the video description, Del Rey added a transcription. It read: "i lost my reputation, i forgot my truth. But i have my beauty and i have my youth. 'TROPICO' the film, coming next year [sic]". Spinner responded to the ambiguous afterthought with confusion, stating they were not aware of what it meant. As on November 21, 2012, the video for "Bel Air" has garnered over 3 million views on video-hosting website, YouTube. The video has since been made private.

== Usage in media ==
Alongside Paradise, Del Rey launched a short film titled Tropico that features the songs "Body Electric", "Gods and Monsters", and "Bel Air". "Tropico" was filmed in late June 2013; it was directed by Anthony Mandler, who also directed Del Rey's previous music videos for "National Anthem" and "Ride". Via social media platforms, Del Rey released several promotional images for the film, one depicting Del Rey in a wimple reminiscent of Mary, Mother of Jesus and another with Del Rey holding a snake and posing as Eve, the biblical wife of Adam from Genesis. In August 2013, Del announced on Twitter that the film would have two premieres: One at the Hollywood Forever Cemetery in Los Angeles and one in an unspecified location in New York; she referred to the short film as a "farewell". Critics noted that this contradicted other claims by Del Rey that she would release a third studio album, with a demo of the song "Black Beauty" leaking online. It was later cleared that Del Rey meant a farewell to the Born to Die era before moving on to the follow-up, "Ultraviolence". On November 22, 2013, an official trailer for "Tropico" was released; at the end of the trailer, it was announced that the film will be uploaded to Del Rey's official VEVO account on December 5, 2013. On December 3, 2013, Del Rey announced on Facebook that "Tropico" will be screened at the Cinerama Dome in Hollywood, California on December 4, 2013 prior to its VEVO release.

== Critical reception ==
Canada.com reviewer Leah Collins called "Bel Air" an Enya-channeled, eerie waltz. Conversely, The Huffington Post dismissed both "Bel Air" and "Yayo" as Paradise's "filler tracks". Dissatisfied with other songs on Paradise, Digital Spy said, on "Bel Air", Del Rey finally gets it right, calling the song "a snowy, Tim Burton-inspired ballad.

== Charts ==
Chart (2012)	Peak position
France (SNEP)	105
UK Singles (OCC)	184
US Hot Rock Songs (Billboard)	50
