= Blue Velvet (song) =

1951 song

Single by Tony Bennett
- B-side: "Solitaire"
- Released: September 21, 1951
- Recorded: July 17, 1951
- Studio: Columbia 30th Street, New York City
- Genre: Traditional pop
- Length: 3:01
- Label: Columbia
- Songwriters: Bernie Wayne; Lee Morris

Tony Bennett singles chronology
"Cold, Cold Heart" (1951)	"Blue Velvet" (1951)	"Here in My Heart" (1952)

"Blue Velvet"

Single by Bill Farrell
- B-side: "Be Mine Tonight"
- Released: September 1951
- Genre: Traditional pop
- Length: 2:31
- Label: MGM
- Songwriters: Bernie Wayne; Lee Morris

Bill Farrell singles chronology
"Four Twenty A.M. (with The Girlfriends)" (1950)	"Blue Velvet" (1951)	"Heaven Knows Why" (1952)

"Blue Velvet"

Single by Arthur Prysock
- B-side: "The Morningside of the Mountain"
- Released: September 1951
- Recorded: July 23, 1951
- Studio: Decca Studios, Pythian Temple, New York City
- Genre: Traditional pop
- Length: 2:57
- Label: Decca
- Songwriters: Bernie Wayne; Lee Morris

Arthur Prysock singles chronology
"Blue Velvet" (1951)	"(It's No) Sin" (1951)

"Blue Velvet" is a popular song written and composed in 1950 by Bernie Wayne and Lee Morris. A top-20 hit for Tony Bennett in its original 1951 version, the song has since been covered many times, with a 1963 version by Bobby Vinton reaching number one.

== Inspiration and composition ==
Songwriter Bernie Wayne was inspired to begin writing "Blue Velvet" on a 1951 visit to Richmond, Virginia, where he stayed at the Jefferson Hotel. At a party at the hotel, Wayne continually caught sight of a female guest dressed in blue velvet with whom he would have a holiday romance.

== Tony Bennett original version and 1951 covers ==
The song's co-writer Bernie Wayne had pitched "Blue Velvet" to Columbia Records head artists and repertoire man Mitch Miller, who as soon as he had heard the song's opening measure: "She wore blue velvet", had suggested giving the song to Tony Bennett. (Wayne's response: "Don't you want to hear the rest of the song?", caused Miller to opine: "Quit while you're ahead!") Recorded in a July 17, 1951, session with the Percy Faith orchestra and released September 21, 1951, Bennett's version peaked at number 16 on the Billboard chart of Records Most Played by Disc Jockeys, while reaching number 18 on Billboard's chart of Best Selling Pop Singles, and number 18 on Billboard's chart of Most Played Juke Box Records. Bennett's version of "Blue Velvet" made its album debut on a 1959 compilation LP that was also titled Blue Velvet. The single's B-side "Solitaire" was also a top-20 hit.

"Blue Velvet" was expediently covered by Arthur Prysock—whose version although recorded a week after Bennett's evidently was the first version released, in August 1951—Bill Farrell, and Norman Kaye (a solo act who was also a member of the Mary Kaye Trio): the Cash Box Top 50 singles chart ranked Bennett's version and the three covers in tandem, with a peak position of number 12 attained on the chart dated December 1, 1951. Cash Box also ranked Bennett's version as high as number 11 on its chart of the Nation's Top 10 Juke Box Tunes.

The New York Times music journalist Stephen Holden would vaunt "Blue Velvet" as one of the four tracks to define the first phase of Bennett's recording career; according to Holden, "Blue Velvet" along with "Because of You" (1951), "Cold, Cold Heart" (1951), and "Stranger in Paradise" (1953), "stand as the gorgeous final flowering of the high-romantic style invented in the 1940s by Sinatra [with] arranger Axel Stordahl. Pure and throbbing, ...Bennett's voice adds a semi-operatic heft to Sinatra's more intimate crooning style. Male pop singing since [the mid-1950s] has never been [so] unabashedly sweet." In 1957 Bennett would begin a longstanding working relationship with jazz pianist Ralph Sharon who Bennett would recall advised him: "If you keep singing...sweet saccharine songs like 'Blue Velvet' sooner or later...you're going to stop selling [records]" and with his 1957 album The Beat of My Heart - produced and conducted by Sharon - Bennett had launched a new musical persona as an intensely intimate song stylist.

A live version of "Blue Velvet" was featured on the 1962 concert album Tony Bennett at Carnegie Hall, with the selection being included on The Good Life, a 1963 EP release in the UK. Bennett dueted with k.d. lang on a remake of "Blue Velvet" for his 2011 album Duets II, while Bennett's 2012 album Viva Duets featured Bennett duetting on "Blue Velvet" with Maria Gadú, who sang her part in Portuguese. ("Blue Velvet" was a bonus cut on an edition of Viva Duets sold exclusively through Target.)

== The Clovers version ==
"Blue Velvet"

Single by The Clovers
- B-side: "If You Love Me (Why Don't You Tell Me So)"
- Released: 1955
- Recorded: December 16, 1954
- Studio: Atlantic, New York City
- Genre: Rhythm and blues
- Length: 2:38
- Label: Atlantic
- Songwriters: Bernie Wayne; Lee Morris

In 1955, the Clovers released a version of the song through Atlantic Records as a single. The song was initially recorded, produced, and released when the R&B group was still composed of John "Buddy" Bailey (lead singer), Billy Mitchell, Matthew McQuater, Harold Lucas, Harold Winley, and Bill Harris. Various members of the group left, died, or were replaced, although the group as a whole still performed the song regardless of whom its members were. The single reached No. 14 on Billboard's Rhythm & Blues Records chart of "Best Sellers in Stores". In 1956, the Clovers released the song on their eponymous album.

== The Statues version ==
The first version of "Blue Velvet" to appear on the Billboard Hot 100 during the rock 'n' roll era was recorded and released by the Statues, a Nashville-based doo-wop trio consisting of Buzz Cason, Hugh Jarrett, and Richard Williams. In 1959 Cason and Williams, members of local rockabilly band the Casuals, had been invited by Jarrett, a former member of the Jordanaires and later a disc jockey at WLAC, to join him - along with veteran background singer and composer Marijohn Wilkin - to form a vocal chorale who would back artists recording in Nashville; the three male members of the chorale were signed to Liberty Records by label founder Al Bennett, who had Snuff Garrett - in his apparent debut as a producer - record the trio in three sessions at the Bradley Studios at the end of November or the beginning of December 1959.

Two sides from the Garrett sessions had a May 1960 single release credited to the Statues (the group name was a reference to the Statue of Liberty, as the group was signed to Liberty Records): the intended A-side was the Marijohn Wilkin original co-write (with Polly Harrison) "Keep the Hall Light Burning" but it was the flip: a remake of "Blue Velvet", which would not only become a Top Ten hit in Nashville but also rank on regional hit parades across the US rising as high as No. 8 on the September 30, 1960 Top 50 survey for preeminent Los Angeles Top 40 station KRLA. However, the Statues's version of "Blue Velvet" would only accrue enough focused national interest to rank on the Hot 100 for a period of three weeks in August 1960, with a peak of No. 84, while reaching No. 80 on the Cash Box Top 100.

== Bobby Vinton version ==
"Blue Velvet"

Single by Bobby Vinton

from the album Blue on Blue
- B-side: "Is There a Place (Where I Can Go)"
- Released: August 2, 1963
- Recorded: May 27, 1963
- Studio: Columbia, Nashville, Tennessee
- Genre: Orchestral pop
- Length: 2:47
- Label: Epic
- Songwriters: Bernie Wayne; Lee Morris
- Producer: Bob Morgan

Bobby Vinton singles chronology
"Blue on Blue" (1963)	"Blue Velvet" (1963)	"There! I've Said It Again" (1963)

=== Background ===
The most successful recording of "Blue Velvet" was recorded (on May 27, 1963) and released by Bobby Vinton in August 1963, backed by Burt Bacharach and his Orchestra. Bobby Vinton's version reached No. 1 on the Billboard Hot 100 on 21 September 1963 and remained at No. 1 for the subsequent two weeks. "Blue Velvet" also afforded Vinton a No. 1 hit on the U.S. Middle-Road Singles chart, where its No. 1 tenure was eight weeks.

Bobby Vinton's No. 3 hit in the summer of 1963, "Blue on Blue", prompted the recording of the Blue on Blue album comprising songs featuring the word "blue" in the title. Although songwriter Bernie Wayne would recall being told by Vinton that the singer had wanted to record the song since hearing the Tony Bennett version in 1951 it was reportedly Vinton's friend, music publisher Al Gallico, who suggested "Blue Velvet" as a Blue on Blue album track and sent his secretary with a dollar to a music store to purchase the song's sheet music; an hour later, Vinton had recorded "Blue Velvet" in two takes. Vinton did not expect the song to be a hit, and believed that his remake of "Am I Blue?" had more sales potential.

Vinton's version was ranked No. 5 on Billboard's end of year ranking "Top Records of 1963", No. 4 on Cash Box's "Top 100 Chart Hits of 1963", and No. 8 on Cash Box's "Top 100 Chart Hits of 1964".

Vinton's recording failed to make the British charts when originally released, but the track's being heard in a televised ad campaign for Nivea cold cream effected a 1990 UK re-release with "Blue Velvet" reaching No. 2 on the UK Singles Chart.

=== Charts ===
==== Weekly charts ====
Chart (1963)	Peak position
Argentina (Prensario)	6
Australia (Music Maker)	9
Canada (CHUM Hit Parade) (5 weeks)	1
New Zealand (Lever Hit Parade)	1
Peru (La Prensa)	8
Philippines	5
South Africa	6
US Billboard Hot 100	1
US Billboard Middle-Road Singles	1
US Cash Box Top 100	1

Chart (1990–91)	Peak position
Belgium (Ultratop 50 Flanders)	38
Europe (Eurochart Hot 100)	6
Ireland (IRMA)	3
Portugal (AFP)	1
UK Singles (Official Charts)	2

==== All-time charts ====
Chart (1958–2018)	Position
US Billboard Hot 100	596

== Lana Del Rey version ==
"Blue Velvet"
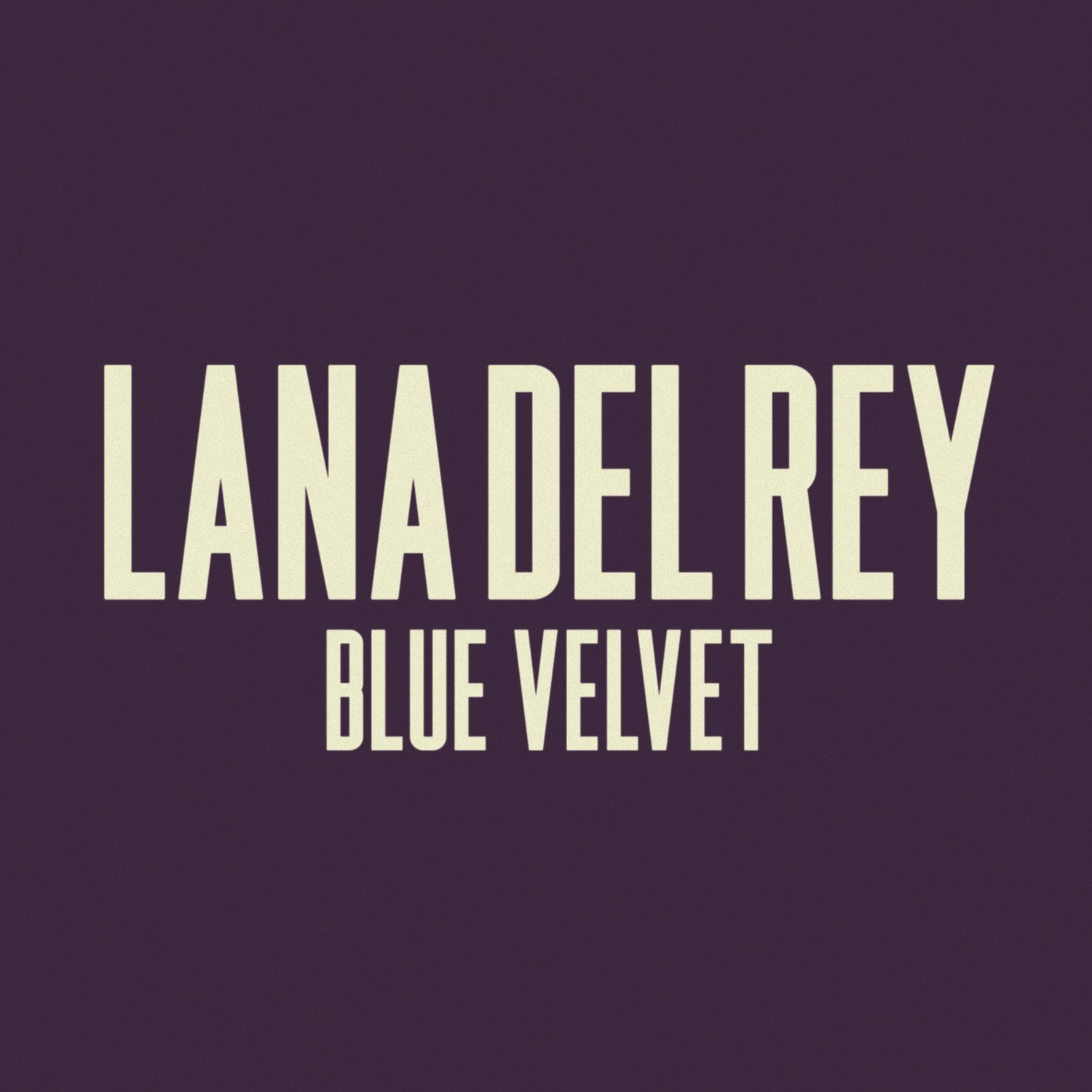

Promotional single by Lana Del Rey

from the EP Paradise
- A-side: "Ride"
- Released: September 20, 2012
- Studio: Record Plant (Los Angeles, CA)
- Genre: Sadcore
- Length: 2:36
- Label: Interscope
- Songwriters: Bernie Wayne; Lee Morris
- Producer: Emile Haynie

Lana Del Rey promotional singles chronology
"Carmen" (2012)	"Blue Velvet" (2012)	"Burning Desire" (2013)

Licensed audio
- "Blue Velvet" on YouTube

American singer and songwriter Lana Del Rey released a cover of the song "Blue Velvet" in 2012. It appears on her third extended play, Paradise. It was released as a promotional single on September 20, 2012, through Interscope Records, and used in an advertising campaign for the clothing retailer H&M.

=== Background ===
Del Rey had recorded a cover of "Blue Velvet" for her 2012 H&M Autumn campaign. On September 20, the song was released as a promotional single. Del Rey was selected for the H&M ad campaign after a performance at a Mulberry dinner party. Industry figures Michelle Williams, Alexa Chung, Elizabeth Olsen, and Anna Wintour attended the party and were impressed by the performance. A public relations manager for H&M said Del Rey was chosen because they "were looking for a style icon and singer to model our fall collection and so Lana Del Rey was the perfect choice."

=== Music video ===
On September 19, the music video for "Blue Velvet", which served as a commercial for the H&M 2012 Autumn Collection as well, was released through H&M. In the video, Del Rey is singing the song in a low-lit room before an audience of pallid people, playing an Americana lounge singer dressed in a pink mohair sweater, She is then hypnotized. Three women dressed identically to Del Rey sit on a couch and watch her coldly. At the end, a little man walks into the room, pulls out the plug for Del Rey's microphone, silencing her. Compared to the David Lynch film of the same name, it was directed by Johan Renck, and composed in post-World War II Americana fashion and the notion of external beauty cloaking inner vulnerability. A behind the scenes video was filmed and posted to H&M's official YouTube channel.

=== Critical reception ===
Rolling Stone called Del Rey's cover "doleful." Jenna Hally Rubenstein, writing for MTV, called the commercial and vocals "moody, totally broody," playfully adding, "What would a Lana Del Rey campaign be if it didn't make you feel a tad depressed?" In the video, Rubenstein said Del Rey was a "ridiculous beauty" sporting a Brigitte Bardot–inspired look, which she added, not every singer can pull off. People said the video was dramatic, intriguing, unique, and played off the moody, vintage Hollywood image of the retro-inspired starlet. Appropriately, they wrote, the video had film noir elements. Specifically, it was compared to the neo-noir film, Mulholland Drive, as well as to the film Blue Velvet itself. In an interview with Artinfo, David Lynch spoke out about Del Rey's cover:

Lana Del Rey, she's got some fantastic charisma and — this is a very interesting thing — it's like she's born out of another time. She's got something that's very appealing to people. And I didn't know she was influenced by me!

=== Track listing ===
Digital download

1. "Blue Velvet" – 2:36

=== Credits and personnel ===
Credits adapted from the liner notes of Paradise.

Performance

- Lana Del Rey – vocals

Instruments

- The Larry Gold Orchestra – strings

Technical and production

- Ben Baptie – mixing assistant
- Spencer Burgess Jr. – assistant recording engineer
- John Davis – mastering
- Tom Elmhirst – mixing
- Larry Gold – string arrangements
- Emile Haynie – production

=== Charts ===
Chart (2012)	Peak position
Austria (Ö3 Austria Top 40)	40
France (SNEP)	40
Germany (GfK)	49
Italy (FIMI)	61
Spain (Promusicae)	44
Switzerland (Schweizer Hitparade)	42
UK Singles (Official Charts)	60

=== Release history ===
Country	Date	Format	Label
France	September 20, 2012	Digital download	Universal
Germany	September 20, 2012	Digital download	Vertigo; Capitol
United Kingdom	September 20, 2012	Digital download	Polydor
United States	September 25, 2012	Digital download	Interscope
Canada	September 25, 2012	Digital download	Interscope

== Other recordings ==
The Moonglows doowop group cover the song on their 1956 Chess Records album, "Look It's The Moonglows." The Paragons released a version of the song as a single in 1960. Their version reached No. 103 on Billboard's "Bubbling Under the Hot 100". It spent three weeks on the chart in the autumn of 1960, sharing the "Bubbling Under" chart for two weeks with the version by the Statues, which had just dropped off the Hot 100 (see Section 4 above).

Lawrence Welk and His Orchestra released a version in 1963, as a single and on the album Wonderful! Wonderful! It reached No. 103 on Billboard's Bubbling Under the Hot 100. A different, fully instrumental recording was featured on Welk's 1965 album Apples & Bananas.

Ronnie McDowell's 1991 album Unchained Melody featured a duet of the song between himself and Vinton.

The 2016 album Upward Spiral by the Branford Marsalis Quartet with vocalist Kurt Elling features a remake of "Blue Velvet".

Australian singer Kylie Minogue recorded "Blue Velvet" and included it as the fourth song in the track list of her 2019 live album Golden Live in Concert.

The Moonglows recorded "Blue Velvet" in 1956, but it was not released for several years.

== Use in film soundtracks ==
Bobby Vinton's version is featured several times in David Lynch's 1986 film Blue Velvet. The film drew partial inspiration from the song's lyrics, where Isabella Rossellini, who plays Dorothy Vallens, a singer in the film, sings the song in-character. Lynch selected the song, because it conceptually matched the mood of the film. Specifically, in an interview he gave to the Village Voice, Lynch said of the song: "The mood that came with that song a mood, a time, and things that were of that time." Songwriter Bernie Wayne would state that at the film's premiere, he was told by Lynch that when he was a high school student in 1963, Vinton's "Blue Velvet" had been his favorite song.
