= Ride (Lana Del Rey song) =

2012 single by Lana Del Rey

Single by Lana Del Rey

from the EP Paradise
- B-side: "Blue Velvet"
- Released: September 25, 2012
- Studio: Shangri-La (Los Angeles, CA); Westlake Recording Studios (Hollywood, CA); Sarm Studios (London, UK)
- Genre: Blue-eyed soul; country-soul; pop soul
- Length: 4:49
- Label: Polydor; Interscope
- Songwriters: Lana Del Rey; Justin Parker
- Producer: Rick Rubin

Lana Del Rey singles chronology
"Summertime Sadness" (2012)	"Ride" (2012)	"Dark Paradise" (2013)

Music video
- "Ride" on YouTube

"Ride" is a song by American singer-songwriter Lana Del Rey from her third extended play (EP), Paradise (2012). The song was written by Lana Del Rey and Justin Parker, while produced by Rick Rubin, the song served as the reissue's first single on September 25, 2012 through Interscope Records. "Ride" is a soulful ballad that thematically involves parental problems, alcohol consumption, and loneliness. The cover for the song depicts Del Rey on a tire swing, wearing cowboy boots and a denim jacket.

"Ride" received critical acclaim from music critics, who compared Del Rey's vocals with that of Adele and Brandon Flowers of the Killers. While only a modest hit in the United States, Switzerland, Ireland, and France, the song reached the top 10 in Russia. The accompanying music video for "Ride" was directed by Anthony Mandler, and was released on October 12, 2012. Del Rey's role in the video was compared to Lolita and A Streetcar Named Desire. The monologue treatment at the start and end of the video met polarized opinion; some considered it "meaningless" and a "gibe to her critics", while others called it "moving".

== Composition ==
"Ride"
"Ride" is a ballad. Del Rey's vocals were called smokey and languorous.

"Ride" is a pop soul, country-soul, and blue-eyed soul ballad. In the song, Del Rey sings over a string-drenched, piano-driven melody produced by Rick Rubin. Lyrically, the song was written by Del Rey and Justin Parker, who co-wrote almost every song on Del Rey's debut album, Born to Die. In the song, Del Rey sings lines such as, "I'm tired of feeling like I'm fucking crazy" and "Been trying' hard not to get into trouble/But I, I've got a war in my mind... so I just ride". The song opens with an audible inhalation, before Del Rey gushes out, "I've been out on that open road". The recording features mild cursing, but is otherwise laced with nostalgic lyrics and husky vocals. To further promote the single and album, an EP was released containing remixes of "Ride". Contributing artists include Sohn, MJ Cole, Eli Escobar, 14th, Wes James, and James Lavelle.

== Critical reception ==
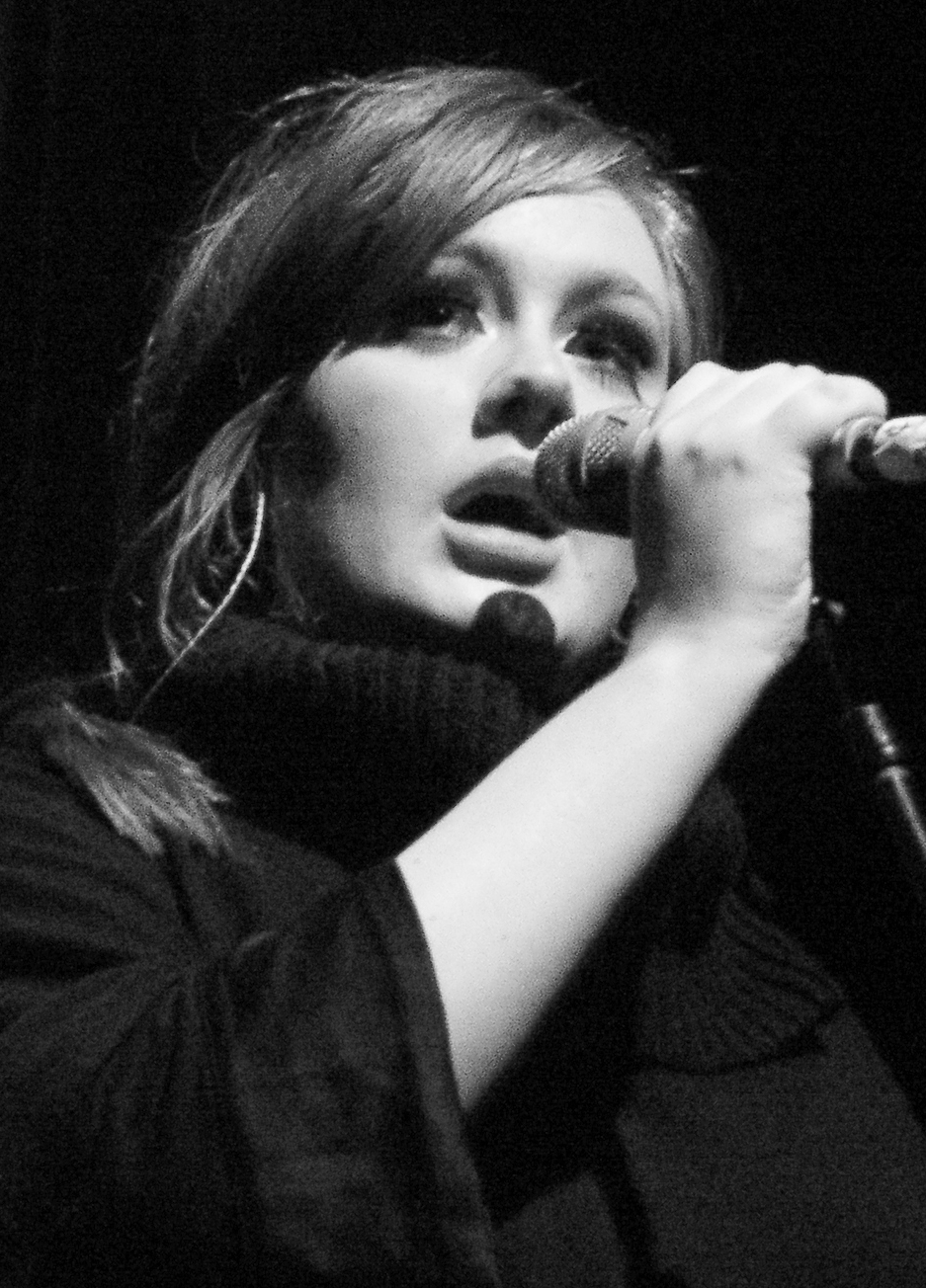
Critics said "Ride" elevated Del Rey to the soul pop levels of singers like Adele.

"Ride" earned critical commendation from music critics. Contactmusic.com noticed the track adheres to Del Rey's trademark sound, stating that the notion of her even having a trademark after one commercially successful album indicates that "we haven't seen the last of her just yet." Of the production itself, it was said that "Ride" is more accomplished than Del Rey's previous endeavors, with the strengths of the track outshining the flaws. The reviewer concluded by saying, "All that doe-eyed “you can be my full-time daddy / baby” shtick is going to start getting a little tired pretty soon, though, we reckon."

NME blogged that the song's most significant lyric read, "I'm tired of feeling like I'm fucking crazy", while stating that the accompanying music video may be produced solely by Del Rey, as the videos for "Carmen" and "Video Games" were. In a separate review for the same publication, Eve Barlow was critical of the song, writing that Del Rey sounded like "an oversexed frog being dragged against a washboard." Pitchfork Media opined aforementioned lyric was a rare moment of raw emotion by Del Rey. Billboard wrote: "Ride' is a long, dreamy ballad that swells into full view during the chorus, when the singer declares, 'Been trying' hard not to get into trouble/But I, I've got a war in my mind… so I just ride." MTV called "Ride" a "slow burn" and "as mellow and languorous...as on her debut." Another MTV review said: "On 'Ride,' Rey sings what she knows best: loneliness, some daddy issues and day-drinking. All of this is probably a metaphor for something, but honestly, we’re still trying to figure out what those 'Born To Die' tigers mean." A third review by MTV dubbed the single the number one "Must Hear" song of the week, saying, "Heaven is truly a place on Earth with you, Miss Lana." Similarities were drawn between "Ride" and work by The Killers frontman, Brandon Flowers, on his solo debut, Flamingo. Stuff said the title "Ride" was predictably pokerfaced. Cameron Matthew of Spinner noted that Del Rey "amped up on the smokey vocals" with "Ride."

Tom Breihan of Stereogum said "Ride": "moves [Del Rey] back to the power of "Video Games" and "Blue Jeans" while simultaneously pushing her into a grand Adele crossover-soul-pop zone. It's really nice. There's hope for this lady yet!" Amanda Dobbins of Vulture wrote that Del Rey is "still calling men who are not her father 'Daddy," on "Ride." Dose reviewer Leah Collins called the record "predictably morose". Complex named "Ride" the eighth best song of 2012.

== Track listing ==
Digital download
No.	Title	Writer(s)	Producer(s)	Length
1.	"Ride" (radio edit)	Lana Del Rey; Justin Parker	Rick Rubin	4:12
2.	"Ride"	Del Rey; Parker	Rubin	4:46
Total length:				8:58

European digital remixes EP (select countries)
No.	Title	Writer(s)	Producer(s)	Length
1.	"Ride"	Del Rey; Parker	Rubin	4:49
2.	"Ride" (Active Child Remix)	Del Rey; Parker	Rubin	3:42
3.	"Blue Velvet" (Penguin Prison Remix)	Bernie Wayne; Lee Morris	Emile Haynie	5:02
4.	"Blue Velvet" (Lindstrom Remix)	Wayne; Morris	Haynie	9:26
Total length:				22:59

US digital remixes EP
No.	Title	Writer(s)	Producer(s)	Length
1.	"Ride" (Sohn Remix)	Del Rey; Parker	Rubin	5:12
2.	"Ride" (M. J. Cole Remix)	Del Rey; Parker	Rubin	5:55
3.	"Ride" (Eli Escobar Remix)	Del Rey; Parker	Rubin	7:52
4.	"Ride" (14th Remix)	Del Rey; Parker	Rubin	3:43
5.	"Ride" (Wes James Remix)	Del Rey; Parker	Rubin	4:20
6.	"Ride" (Lyla's Surprise) (James Lavelle Remix)	Del Rey; Parker	Rubin	8:13
Total length:				35:15

7" vinyl
No.	Title	Writer(s)	Producer(s)	Length
1.	"Ride"	Del Rey; Parker	Rubin	4:49
2.	"Ride" (Active Child Remix)	Del Rey; Parker	Rubin	3:42
Total length:				8:31

== Credits and personnel ==
Credits for Paradise adapted from Barnes & Noble.

Performance

- Lana Del Rey – primary artist, vocals, backing vocals, composer, writer

Technical

- Justin Parker – composer
- Rick Rubin – producer
- Andrew Scheps – mixer

== Charts ==
Chart (2012)	Peak position
Australia (ARIA)	89
Austria (Ö3 Austria Top 40)	63
Belgium (Ultratip Bubbling Under Flanders)	3
Belgium (Ultratip Bubbling Under Wallonia)	6
Denmark (Tracklisten)	40
France (SNEP)	56
Germany (GfK)	44
Ireland (IRMA)	35
Italy (FIMI)	83
Russia (2M)	9
Scottish Singles Sales (Official Charts)	31
Switzerland (Schweizer Hitparade)	20
UK Singles (Official Charts)	32
US Adult Alternative Songs (Billboard)	26
US Hot Rock Songs (Billboard)	21

== Certifications ==
Region	Certification	Certified units/sales
Australia (ARIA)	Platinum	70,000^{‡}
Brazil (Pro-Música Brasil)	Platinum	60,000^{‡}
Denmark (IFPI Danmark)	Gold	45,000^{‡}
New Zealand (RMNZ)	Platinum	30,000^{‡}
United Kingdom (BPI)	Gold	400,000^{‡}
United States (RIAA)	Platinum	1,000,000^{‡}
^{‡} Sales+streaming figures based on certification alone.

== Release history ==
Region	Date	Format	Label	Ref.
Canada	September 25, 2012	Digital download	Interscope	
Italy	September 25, 2012	Digital download	Universal	
Spain	September 25, 2012	Digital download	Universal	
United States	September 25, 2012	Digital download	Interscope	
Italy	October 12, 2012	Contemporary hit radio	Universal	
Germany	November 9, 2012	Digital download	Vertigo	
United Kingdom	November 9, 2012	Digital remixes EP	Polydor	
United Kingdom	November 11, 2012	Digital download	Polydor	
United Kingdom	November 12, 2012	7-inch vinyl	Polydor	
United States	November 19, 2012	Digital remixes EP	Interscope	
