= Burning Desire (song) =

2013 promotional single by Lana Del Rey

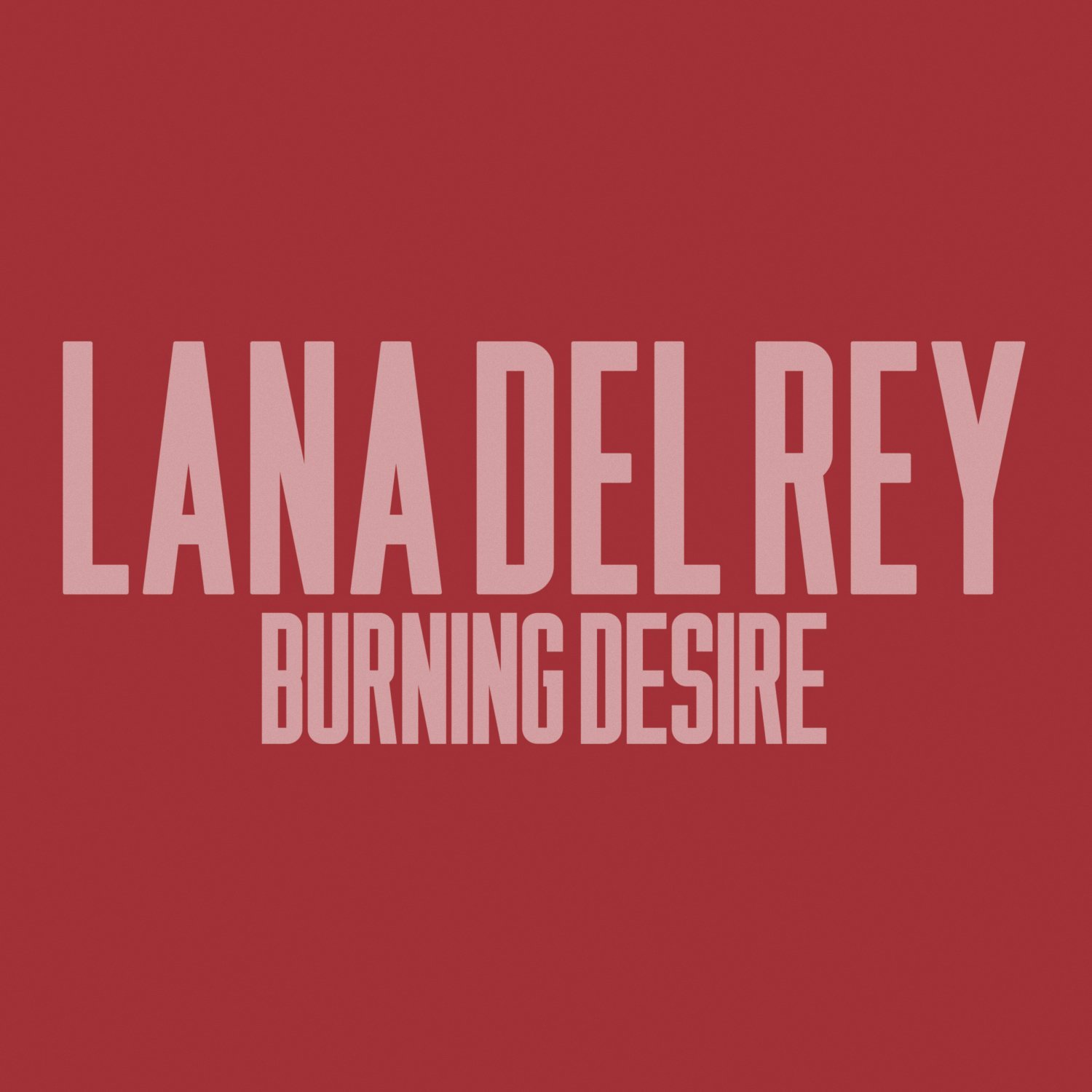

Promotional single by Lana Del Rey

from the EP Paradise
- Released: March 19, 2013
- Studio: Sarm Studios (London, England)
- Genre: Trip hop
- Length: 3:51
- Label: Interscope; Polydor
- Songwriters: Elizabeth Grant; Justin Parker
- Producer: Emile Haynie

Lana Del Rey promotional singles chronology
"Blue Velvet" (2012)	"Burning Desire" (2013)	"Black Beauty" (2014)

Music video
- "Burning Desire" on YouTube

"Burning Desire" is a song by American singer and songwriter Lana Del Rey. Initially available for digital download upon pre-ordering Del Rey's third EP, Paradise, "Burning Desire" was released as a promotional single on March 19, 2013. One month earlier, a music video for the song was released on Valentine's Day. Lyrically composed by Lana Del Rey and her long-time collaborator, Justin Parker, the record was produced by Emile Haynie.

== Background and composition ==
In 2012, Del Rey was named the new figurehead of the latest brand of the Jaguar F-Type automobile. To promote the photoshoot, she sang "Burning Desire" at the Paris Motor Show, wearing red lipstick and a white sundress.

The song is composed by Del Rey and Justin Parker, co-author of the bulk of Born to Die. "Burning Desire" is a tragically-themed love song, with the lyrics: "I drive fast, wind in my hair/ I push it to the limits/ 'Cause I just don't care". Breathless pants and groans begin the track. On writing the song, Del Rey said:

Making art means making tough decisions. I do believe you create your own life path and that you will be rewarded for following your passions—and sticking to it. It's just good to know now, with people like Jaguar and working with them, that I'm not the only one out there with such strident, creative beliefs.

== Music video ==
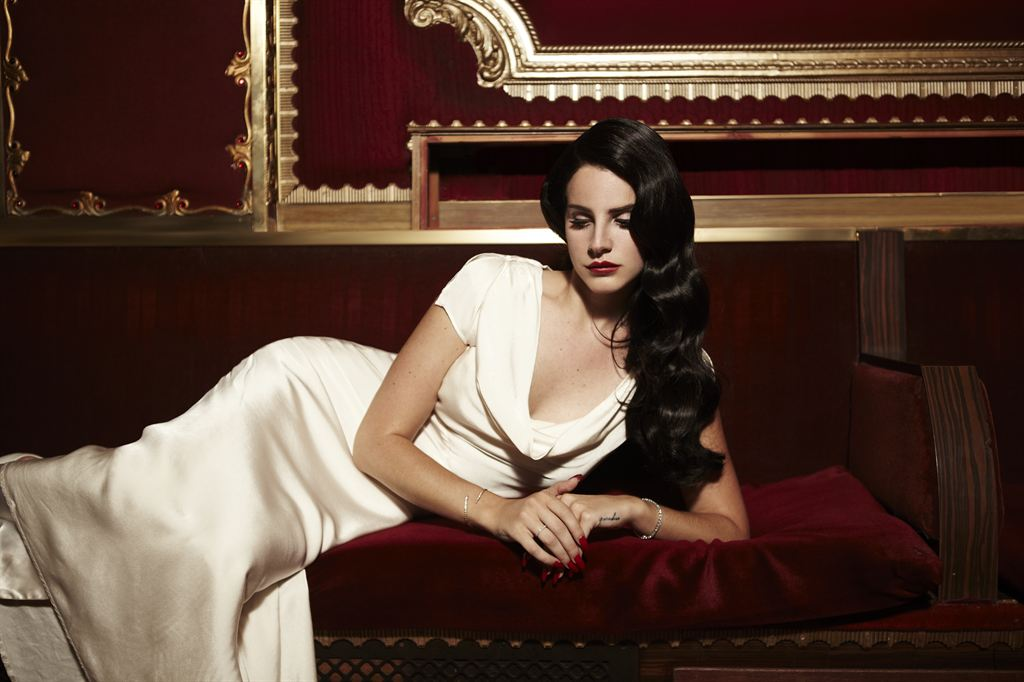
Del Rey in a promotional photograph taken during the filming of the music video for "Burning Desire"

A promotional video for "Burning Desire" appeared online on Valentine's Day of 2013, featuring Del Rey as her usual lounge singer persona, interspersed with snippets of the Jaguar F-Type. Directed by Anthony Shurmer, the video was filmed in the Rivoli Ballroom in London's South end. The video contains "bright red floral imagery, California landmarks name-checked, reckless automotive shout-outs, old Hollywood imagery and cinematic glamour, some epic lipstick[...]". NME called the video "typically sumptuous", heavy on the product placement. Desire Thompson of VIBE noted that Del Rey channeled her inner Jessica Rabbit in the 1960s social-scene video for the promotional single.

== Critical reception ==
Nicole Sia of SPIN said the video was a straightforward affair, channeling Del Rey's typical retro-inspired style, interloped with old-fashioned video clips. "Fast cars might not be everyone's idea of paradise, but at least for LDR it pays the bills." Sia concluded. After hearing the song, The Independent dubbed the singer, "Queen of sultry pop".

== Usage in other media ==
The song serves as the title track to a 13-minute promotional short film for the Jaguar F-Type, called Desire. The film, directed by Adam Smith, produced by Ridley Scott and stars Damian Lewis. Filmed in Chile in 2012, the film was launched in April 2013 at the Sundance Film Festival and available for free streaming online. In the movie, Lewis going by the name Sydney Clarke delivers the Jaguar F-Type to a notorious gangster named Ernesto Martinez (played by Jordi Molla) and finds trouble in a love interest (played by Shannyn Sossamon) in a desert setting.

== Release history ==
Region	Date	Format	Label
Canada, Costa Rica, Mexico, United States	March 19, 2013	Digital download; streaming	Polydor; Interscope

== Charts ==
Chart (2012)	Peak position
UK Singles (OCC)	172
