= Kill Kill =

EP by Lizzy Grant
- Released: October 21, 2008
- Recorded: 2008
- Length: 13:40
- Label: 5 Points
- Producer: David Kahne

Lizzy Grant chronology
Kill Kill (2008)	Lana Del Ray (2010)

Kill Kill is the debut extended play (EP) by American singer-songwriter Lana Del Rey, released under her real name Lizzy Grant, on October 21, 2008, in the United States through 5 Points Records. The three songs on the EP would later be included on the 2010 album Lana Del Ray. "Yayo" would later be re-recorded and released a third time, on Del Rey's 2012 EP, Paradise. "Kill Kill" was the EP's only single. A music video accompanied the track and was published in 2008.

== Background and composition ==
"Kill Kill"
"Kill Kill", the EP's only single, combines electronica and blues rock elements, over Marilyn Monroe inspired vocals. The lyrics were composed solely by Del Rey and were called "dark", "poetic", and "elegant".

The title track, "Kill Kill", was originally titled "The Ocean"; however, the title changed after a record producer dismissed the name as "boring". In frustration, Del Rey crossed out "The Ocean" above the lyrics, and wrote "Kill Kill" in place of a title.

"Yes, when I recorded with Davey (David Kahne), we recorded 13 songs. So I was never expecting to release an EP, but when iTunes came to us, and became fervent supporters and said, "put out anything and we'll give you the artist's spotlight". We decided, okay, we'll just put out an EP, which was released on October 21".

In an interview, Del Rey called the EP's genre "Hawaiian glam metal". Artists that influenced the EP's sound include Elvis Presley, Poison, and Van Halen. Songwriter and producer David Nichtern revealed to MTV that Kill Kill was a way for Del Rey and her team to generate some buzz before releasing a fully produced studio album. Writing for The Huffington Post, Felicia C. Sullivan said that the EP was "decidedly anti-genre", containing elements of jazz, pop, electronica, rock, and blues.

== Critical reception ==
Index Magazine called Kill Kill "lush and cinematic, with strings, Wurlitzers, and electric guitars". On the three tracks, Del Rey's voice was called "gravelly" and inspired by Marilyn Monroe. Felicia C. Sullivan, a journalist for The Huffington Post, wrote that Del Rey's vocals were haunting and soulful on Kill Kill. Lyrically, Kill Kill was called dark, poetic, and elegant. Of the videos shot for Kill Kill, Sullivan said they were "quirky, odd, [and] magical", stating that Del Rey must be "infatuated with Americana". Sullivan said it was safe to say that the tracks of Kill Kill tell the story of a "precocious, but strong-willed woman on display". Del Rey endorsed the critique, adding that she:

"... didn't feel trapped in a trailer park. I felt trapped before I got to the trailer park because I had nowhere to live. When I got my trailer, everyone there had the same taste as I did. We all liked giant, lush, fake flower gardens and liked to decorate the walls with streamers even if it wasn't our birthday. I couldn't have been happier there. Before that, I did dream of escaping. I always just figured it was gonna be a man who would take me away. I don't know if I deserve a good man, but I think about it sometimes".

Shirley Halperin of The Hollywood Reporter noted the EP differs from the tone and sound of Del Rey's debut major label single, "Video Games", which gained Del Rey significant mainstream attention. More specifically, Halperin described a contrast in "Video Games", and Del Rey's works before "Video Games", including Kill Kill, with the former having contained a "breathy, melancholy musings", and the latter having contained a "jazz-meets-electronica lounge" sound.

== Track listing ==
All tracks are written by Elizabeth Grant, except where noted and produced by David Kahne.

Kill Kill track listing
No.	Title	Length
1.	"Kill Kill"	4:00
2.	"Yayo"	5:50
3.	"Gramma (Blue Ribbon Sparkler Trailer Heaven)" (additional writer: Kahne)	3:50
Total length:		13:40
