= Emile Haynie production discography =

The following list is a discography of production by Emile Haynie, an American record producer from Buffalo, New York. It includes a list of songs produced, co-produced and remixed by year, artist, album and title.

== Singles produced ==
List of singles as either producer or co-producer, with selected chart positions and certifications, showing year released, performing artists and album name
| Title | Year | Peak chart positions | | | | | | | | | | Certifications | Album |
| Title | Year | US | US R&B | US Rap | AUS | CAN | FRA | GER | NZ | SWE | UK | Certifications | Album |
|---|---|---|---|---|---|---|---|---|---|---|---|---|---|
| "Stuck in a Box" (Young Sid featuring Stan Walker) | 2010 | — | — | — | — | — | — | — | 15 | — | — | | What Doesn't Kill Me... and From the Inside Out |
| "Runaway" (Kanye West featuring Pusha T) | 2010 | 12 | 30 | 9 | 46 | 13 | — | — | — | 28 | 56 | ARIA: Gold | My Beautiful Dark Twisted Fantasy |
| "Mr. Rager" (Kid Cudi) | 2010 | 77 | — | — | — | — | — | — | — | — | — | | Man on the Moon II: The Legend of Mr. Rager |
| "Life Goes On" (Gym Class Heroes featuring Oh Land) | 2011 | — | — | — | — | — | — | — | — | — | — | | The Papercut Chronicles II |
| "Born to Die" (Lana Del Rey) | 2011 | — | — | — | 34 | — | 13 | 29 | — | 59 | 9 | ARIA: Gold; BPI: Silver | Born to Die |
| "Off to the Races" (Lana Del Rey) | 2012 | — | — | — | — | — | — | — | — | — | — | | Born to Die |
| "Carmen" (Lana Del Rey) | 2012 | — | — | — | — | — | — | — | — | — | — | | Born to Die |
| "Blue Jeans" (Lana Del Rey) | 2012 | — | — | — | — | — | 16 | — | — | — | 32 | | Born to Die |
| "My Kind of Love" (Emeli Sandé) | 2012 | 114 | — | — | 60 | — | 167 | — | — | — | 17 | ARIA: Gold; BPI: Silver | Our Version of Events |
| "Summertime Sadness" (Lana Del Rey) | 2012 | — | — | — | — | — | 56 | 44 | — | — | — | RIAA: Platinum; BVMI: Platinum; IFPI AUT: Gold; IFPI SWI: Gold | Born to Die |
| "National Anthem" (Lana Del Rey) | 2012 | — | — | — | — | — | 152 | — | — | — | 92 | | Born to Die |
| "Blue Velvet" (Lana Del Rey) | 2012 | — | — | — | — | — | 40 | 49 | — | — | 60 | | Paradise |
| "Locked Out of Heaven" (Bruno Mars) | 2012 | 1 | — | — | 4 | 1 | 3 | 7 | 4 | 6 | 2 | RIAA: 5× Platinum; ARIA: 5× Platinum; BPI: Platinum; BVMI: Platinum; IFPI DEN: 2× Platinum; IFPI SWI: Platinum; MC: 5× Platinum; RMNZ: 2× Platinum | Unorthodox Jukebox |
| "Doom and Gloom" (The Rolling Stones) | 2012 | — | — | — | — | 72 | 44 | 64 | — | — | 61 | | GRRR! |
| "Dark Paradise" (Lana Del Rey) | 2013 | — | — | — | — | — | — | 45 | — | — | — | | Born to Die |
| "Burning Desire" (Lana Del Rey) | 2013 | — | — | — | — | — | — | — | — | — | 172 | | Paradise |
| "Afraid" (The Neighbourhood) | 2013 | — | — | — | — | — | — | — | — | — | — | | I Love You. |
| "Gorilla" (Bruno Mars) | 2013 | 22 | — | — | 41 | 23 | 117 | — | — | — | 62 | RIAA: Gold; ARIA: Gold; MC: Gold | Unorthodox Jukebox |
| "Young Girls" (Bruno Mars) | 2013 | 32 | — | — | 62 | 19 | 123 | — | 23 | — | 83 | RIAA: Gold; ARIA: Gold; MC: Gold | Unorthodox Jukebox |
| "Headlights" (Eminem featuring Nate Ruess) | 2014 | 45 | 11 | 5 | 21 | 54 | — | — | — | — | 86 | ARIA: Gold | The Marshall Mathers LP 2 |
| "Final Masquerade" (Linkin Park) | 2014 | — | — | — | 43 | 85 | 45 | 70 | 30 | — | 106 | | The Hunting Party |
| "Guts Over Fear" (Eminem featuring Sia) | 2014 | 22 | 6 | 4 | 22 | 9 | 10 | 35 | 22 | 40 | 10 | | Shady XV |
| "Everyday" (ASAP Rocky featuring Rod Stewart, Miguel and Mark Ronson) | 2015 | — | 53 | — | 49 | — | — | — | — | — | 85 | | At. Long. Last. ASAP |
| "New Love" (Dua Lipa) | 2015 | — | — | — | — | — | — | — | — | — | — | | Dua Lipa |
| "Love" (Lana Del Rey) | 2017 | 44 | — | — | 41 | 48 | 12 | 68 | — | 49 | 41 | | Lust for Life |
| "River" (Eminem featuring Ed Sheeran) | 2017 | 11 | 5 | 5 | 2 | 3 | 23 | 3 | 3 | 1 | 2 | | Revival |
| "Consequences" (Camila Cabello) | 2018 | 51 | — | 75 | — | — | — | — | — | — | — | MC: Gold | Camila |
"—" denotes a recording that did not chart or was not released in that territory.

== 2001 ==
=== A.G. & Party Arty ===
- 00. "R.U.G.D. (Emile Remix)"

=== C-Rayz Walz & Plain Pat - The Prelude ===
- 09. "Gear Abby"

== 2002 ==
=== Cormega - The True Meaning ===
- 01. "Introspective"

=== Wastelandz ===
- King of Luck (featuring Kwasi Modough & R.A.P.)

== 2003 ==
=== Obie Trice - Cheers ===
- 05. "Don't Come Down" (co-produced with Eminem)
- 14. "Hoodrats" (co-produced with Eminem)

=== Raekwon - The Lex Diamond Story ===
- 10. "Robbery" (featuring Ice Water Inc.)

== 2004 ==
=== Ghostface - The Pretty Toney Album ===
- 01. "Intro"

Leftover

- 00. "Struggle"

=== Cormega - Legal Hustle ===
- 03. "Let It Go" (featuring M.O.P.)
- 11. "Deep Blue Seas" (featuring Jayo Felony & Kurupt)
- 14. "Redemption" (featuring AZ)

=== Theodore Unit - 718 ===
- 11. "Daily Routine" (performed by Shawn Wiggs)
- 15. "It's the Unit" (performed by Shawn Wiggs, Cappadonna, Ghostface Killah)

=== The Roots - The Tipping Point ===
Leftover

- 00. "Pity the Child"

== 2005 ==
=== Massive Töne - Zurück in die Zukunft ===
- 01. "Bumerang"
- 02. "Easy" (featuring Fetsum)
- 06. "Mein Job"
- 09. "Wellness"
- 10. "Zurück In Die Zukunkt" (featuring Fetsum)

=== Proof - Searching for Jerry Garcia ===
- 02. "Clap wit Me"
- 20. "Kurt Kobain"

=== AZ - A.W.O.L. ===
- 03. "New York" (featuring Raekwon & Ghostface Killah)

=== C-Rayz Walz - Year of the Beast ===
- 11. "Say Werd"

== 2006 ==
=== Obie Trice - Second Round's on Me ===
- 04. "Wanna Know"

=== Remy Ma - There's Something About Remy: Based on a True Story ===
- 16. "Crazy"

=== Ice Cube - Laugh Now, Cry Later ===
- 07. "Doin' What It 'Pose 2Do"

=== Rhymefest - Blue Collar ===
- 05. "All I Do" (produced with Cochise)
- 14. "Bullet" (featuring Citizen Cope) (produced with Cochise)

== 2007 ==
=== WC - Guilty by Affiliation ===
- 06. "Dodgeball" (featuring Snoop Dogg & Butch Cassidy)
- 13. "Gang Injunctions"

=== Ian Brown - The World Is Yours ===
- 01. "The World Is Yours"
- 04. "Save Us"
- 05. "Eternal Flame"
- 07. "Street Children"

=== NYGz - Welcome 2 G-Dom ===
- 03. "3 Man Weave" (featuring Hustle, Mic Ock & Reef)
- 05. "Sufferin'" (featuring Lil Fame & Rave Roulette)
- 09. "What Kinda Life" (featuring Raw)

== 2008 ==
=== AZ - Undeniable ===
- 05. "What Would You Do" (featuring Jay Rush)

=== Ice Cube - Raw Footage ===
- 03. "It Takes a Nation"
- 12. "Get Money, Spend Money, No Money"
- 17. "Believe It or Not" (iTunes bonus track)

=== Kid Cudi - A Kid Named Cudi ===
- 03. "Is There Any Love" (featuring Wale)
- 10. "50 Ways to Make A Record"

== 2009 ==
=== Michael Jackson - The Remix Suite ===
- 10. "Maria (You Were the Only One)" (Show Me the Way to Go Home Remix)

=== Royce da 5'9" - Street Hop ===
- 01. "Gun Harmonizing" (featuring Crooked I)
- 06. "Far Away"
- 15. "On the Run"

=== Slaughterhouse - Slaughterhouse ===
- 09. "Onslaught 2" (featuring Fatman Scoop)
- 15. "Killaz"

=== Kid Cudi - Man on the Moon: The End of Day ===
- 01. "In My Dreams (Cudder Anthem)"
- 02. "Soundtrack 2 My Life"
- 04. "Solo Dolo (Nightmare)"
- 11. "CuDi Zone"

Leftover

- 00. "Bigger Than You"

== 2010 ==
=== Young Sid - What Doesn't Kill Me... ===
- 04. "What Don't Kill Me"
- 06. "Around the World In A Day"
- 08. "Stuck in a Box" (with Stan Walker)
- 09. "The Heist"
- 10. "Taken Away" (featuring Tyree)

=== Stan Walker - From the Inside Out ===
- 13. "Stuck in a Box" (with Young Sid)

=== Meth * Ghost * Rae - Wu-Massacre ===
- 08. "Pimpin' Chipp"

=== Pill - 1140: The Overdose ===
- 13. "Westsiders" (featuring Killer Mike)

=== Eminem - Recovery ===
- 06. "Going Through Changes"

=== Tinie Tempah - Disc-Overy ===
- 10. "Obsession"
- 13. "Let Go" (co-produced with Naughty Boy)

=== Kid Cudi - Man on the Moon II: The Legend of Mr. Rager ===
- 01. "Scott Mescudi vs. the World" (featuring Cee Lo Green) (co-produced with The Smeezingtons & No I.D.)
- 03. "Don't Play This Song" (featuring Mary J. Blige)
- 04. "We Aite (Wake Your Mind Up)" (co-produced with Plain Pat)
- 06. "Mojo So Dope"
- 09. "Wild'n Cuz I'm Young" (co-produced with Plain Pat)
- 10. "The Mood" (co-produced with No I.D.)
- 12. "Mr. Rager" (co-produced with No I.D. & Jeff Bhasker)
- 13. "These Worries" (featuring Mary J. Blige)
- 15. "All Along"
- 16. "GHOST!" (co-produced with No I.D. & Ken Lewis)

=== Kanye West - My Beautiful Dark Twisted Fantasy ===
- 09. "Runaway" (featuring Pusha T) (co-produced with Kanye West, Jeff Bhasker & Mike Dean)

== 2011 ==
=== STS - The Illustrious ===
- 09. "This Is for You"

=== Paradime - Breaking Beauregard ===
- 09. "Lovely Day"

=== Lil Wayne - Tha Carter IV ===
- 19. "Novacane" (featuring Kevin Rudolf) (Bonus Track)

=== Gym Class Heroes - The Papercut Chronicles II ===
- 03. "Life Goes On" (featuring Oh Land)

== 2012 ==
=== Lana Del Rey - Born to Die ===
- 01. "Born to Die"
- 02. "Off to the Races"
- 03. "Blue Jeans"
- 05. "Diet Mountain Dew"
- 06. "National Anthem"
- 07. "Dark Paradise"
- 08. "Radio"
- 09. "Carmen"
- 10. "Million Dollar Man"
- 11. "Summertime Sadness"
- 12. "This Is What Makes Us Girls"
- 13. "Without You" (Bonus Track)
- 14. "Lolita" (Bonus Track)
- 15. "Lucky Ones" (Bonus Track)

=== Pink - The Truth About Love ===
- 01. "Are We All We Are"

=== Emeli Sandé - Our Version of Events ===
- 02. "My Kind of Love" (co-produced with Daniel "Danny Keyz" Tannenbaum and Craze & Hoax)

=== fun. - Some Nights ===
- 08. "All Alright"
- 09. "One Foot"
- 11. "Out on the Town" (Bonus Track)

=== Bruno Mars - Unorthodox Jukebox ===
- 01. "Young Girls"
- 02. "Locked Out of Heaven"
- 04. "Gorilla"
- 05. "Moonshine"
- 11. "Old & Crazy" (featuring Esperanza Spalding) (Bonus Track)

=== Lana Del Rey - Paradise ===
- 02. "American"
- 05. "Blue Velvet"
- 06. "Gods & Monsters"
- 07. "Yayo"
- 09. "Burning Desire"

=== The Rolling Stones - GRRR! ===
Disc two

- 19. "Doom and Gloom" (co-produced)

== 2013 ==
=== ASAP Rocky - Long. Live. ASAP ===
- 16. "I Come Apart" (featuring Florence Welch) (co-produced with Amanda Ghost) (Deluxe Edition Track)

=== OneRepublic - Native ===
- 07. "Can't Stop" (co-produced with Jeff Bhasker, Tyler Sam Johnson and Ryan Tedder)

=== The Neighbourhood - I Love You. ===
- 01. "How"
- 02. "Afraid"
- 03. "Everybody's Watching Me (Uh Oh)"
- 05. "Let It Go"
- 06. "Alleyways"
- 07. "W.D.Y.W.F.M?"
- 08. "Flawless"
- 09. "Female Robbery"
- 10. "Staying Up"
- 11. "Float"

=== Various artists - Music from Baz Luhrmann's Film The Great Gatsby ===
- 07. "Over the Love" (performed by Florence and the Machine)

=== Dyme-A-Duzin - A Portrait of Donnovan ===
- 06. "Wake Up Free"

=== Travis Scott - Owl Pharaoh ===
- 02. "Bad Mood/Shit on You" (co-produced with J Gramm Beats and Travis Scott)

=== Natalia Kills - Trouble ===
- 02. "Problem" (co-produced with Jeff Bhasker and Guillaume Doubet)
- 03. "Stop Me"
- 04. "Boys Don't Cry" (co-produced with Jeff Bhasker)
- 10. "Watching You"
- 13. "Trouble" (co-produced with Jeff Bhasker and Guillaume Doubet)

=== Sampha ===
- 00. "Too Much" (later reworked and produced by Nineteen85 and Sampha for Drake's Nothing Was the Same)

=== Drake - Nothing Was the Same ===
- 12. "Too Much" (featuring Sampha) (reworked and produced by Nineteen85 and Sampha, "Too Much" original producer, writer, engineer)

=== Eminem - The Marshall Mathers LP 2 ===
- 06. "Legacy"
- 15. "Headlights" (featuring Nate Ruess) (produced with Jeff Bhasker)
- 20. "Beautiful Pain" (featuring Sia) (co-produced with Eminem)

=== Lana Del Rey - Tropico ===
- 02. "Gods & Monsters"

== 2014 ==
=== SZA - Z ===
- 06. "Green Mile"
- 09. "Shattered Ring"
- 10. "Omega"

=== Ed Sheeran - x ===
- 06. "Photograph"

=== London Grammar - If You Wait ===
- 14. "Strong (US Radio Edit)"

=== Linkin Park - The Hunting Party ===
- 11. "Final Masquerade"

=== FKA twigs - LP1 ===
- 03. "Two Weeks" (additional production by FKA twigs)
- 04. "Hours" (additional production with Arca. Produced by Clams Casino)
- 06. "Video Girl" (additional production by FKA twigs)
- 09. "Give Up" (additional production by Arca)

=== Various artists - Shady XV ===
- 06. "Guts Over Fear" (Eminem featuring Sia)

== 2015 ==
=== ASAP Rocky - At. Long. Last. ASAP ===
- 17. "Everyday" (featuring Rod Stewart, Miguel and Mark Ronson) (produced with Mark Ronson and Frans Mernick)

=== Mark Ronson - Uptown Special ===
- 01. "Uptown's First Finale" (credited as additional producer, produced by Mark Ronson and Jeff Bhasker)
- 02. "Summer Breaking" (credited as additional producer, produced by Mark Ronson and Jeff Bhasker)
- 07. "Crack in the Pearl" (credited as additional producer, produced by Mark Ronson and Jeff Bhasker)
- 10. "Heavy and Rolling" (credited as additional producer, produced by Mark Ronson and Jeff Bhasker)

=== Laura Welsh - Soft Control ===
- 03. "Break the Fall"
- 05. "God Keeps"

=== Various artists - Home (Original Motion Picture Soundtrack) ===
- 03. "Cannonball" (performed by Kiesza)

=== Emile Haynie - We Fall ===
- 01. "Falling Apart" (featuring Andrew Wyatt & Brian Wilson)
- 02. "Little Ballerina" (featuring Rufus Wainwright)
- 03. "Wait For Life" (featuring Lana Del Rey)
- 04. "Dirty World"
- 05. "A Kiss Goodbye" (featuring Charlotte Gainsbourg, Sampha & Devonte Hynes)
- 06. "Fool Me Too" (featuring Nate Ruess)
- 07. "Nobody Believes You" (featuring Andrew Wyatt & Colin Blunstone)
- 08. "Come Find Me" (featuring Lykke Li & Romy Madley Croft)
- 09. "Who to Blame" (featuring Randy Newman)
- 10. "Ballerina's Reprise" (featuring Father John Misty & Julia Holter)
- 11. "The Other Side"

=== Various artists - Fifty Shades of Grey: Original Motion Picture Soundtrack ===
- 02. "Undiscovered" (performed by Laura Welsh)

=== Nate Ruess - Grand Romantic ===
- 02. "AhHa" (produced with Jeff Bhasker)
- 03. "Nothing Without Love" (produced with Jeff Bhasker)
- 04. "Take It Back" (produced with Jeff Bhasker)
- 06. "What This World Is Coming To" (featuring Beck) (produced with Jeff Bhasker)
- 08. "Moment" (produced with Jeff Bhasker)
- 12. "Brightside" (produced with Jeff Bhasker)

=== Troye Sivan - Blue Neighbourhood ===
- 04. "Talk Me Down" (produced with Bram Inscore)

== 2016 ==
=== Peter Bjorn and John - Breakin' Point ===
- 05. "Breakin' Point"

=== Florence and the Machine - Songs from Final Fantasy XV ===
- 01. "Too Much Is Never Enough"
- 03. "I Will Be"

=== Lady Gaga - Joanne ===
- 09. "Come to Mama"

=== Bruno Mars - 24K Magic ===
- 06. "Straight Up & Down"
- 07. "Calling All My Lovelies"

== 2017 ==
=== Dua Lipa - Dua Lipa ===
- 07. "New Love" (produced with Andrew Wyatt)

=== Eminem - Revival ===
- 04. "Untouchable" (produced with Eminem, Mark Batson and Mr. Porter)
- 05. "River"

=== Lana Del Rey - Lust for Life ===
- "Love" (produced with Lana Del Rey, Benny Blanco, Rick Nowels, Kieron Menzies)

=== Sam Smith - The Thrill of It All ===
- "Baby, You Make Me Crazy" (produced with Steve Fitzmaurice and Jimmy Napes)

== 2018 ==
=== Lykke Li - So Sad So Sexy ===
- 07: "So Sad So Sexy" (produced with Jeff Bhasker and Malay)

=== Florence + The Machine - High as Hope ===
- 01: "June" (produced with Florence Welch and Brett Shaw)
- 02: "Hunger" (produced with Florence Welch)
- 03: "South London Forever" (produced with Florence Welch and Brett Shaw)
- 04: "Big God" (produced with Florence Welch and Brett Shaw)
- 05: "Sky Full of Song" (produced with Florence Welch and Doveman)
- 06: "Grace" (produced with Florence Welch and Brett Shaw)
- 07: "Patricia" (produced with Florence Welch and Brett Shaw)
- 08: "100 Years" (produced with Florence Welch and Brett Shaw)
- 09: "The End of Love" (produced with Florence Welch and Tobias Jesso Jr.)
- 10: "No Choir" (produced with Florence Welch and Brett Shaw)

=== Camila Cabello - Camila ===
- 06: "Consequences"

== 2019 ==
=== Post Malone - Hollywood's Bleeding ===
- 15. "Myself"

== 2020 ==
=== Alicia Keys - Alicia ===
- 02. "Time Machine" (co-production)

=== Kid Cudi - Man on the Moon III: The Chosen ===
- 01. "Beautiful Trip" (co-production)
- 12. "Sept. 16" (co-production)

=== Miley Cyrus - Plastic Hearts ===
- 12. "Golden G String" (produced by Andrew Wyatt)

== 2021 ==
=== Cosha - Mt. Pleasant ===
- 08. "Bad Luck" (produced with Cosha & Mura Masa)

=== Jeremy Zucker - Crusher ===
- 10. "Sociopath" (featuring keshi)

== 2022 ==
=== Liam Gallagher - C'MON YOU KNOW ===
- 01. "More Power" (produced by Andrew Wyatt)
- 02. "Diamond in the Dark" (produced by Andrew Wyatt)

== 2024 ==
=== Halsey – The Great Impersonator ===
- 18. "The Great Impersonator" (Co produced with Michael Uzowuru)

== 2025 ==
=== Sailorr - From Florida's Finest ===
- 02. "Sincerity"

=== Tate McRae - So Close to What ===
- 06. "Purple Lace Bra"

=== Tate McRae - So Close to What (Deluxe) ===
- 01. "TRYING ON SHOES"
- 03. "NOBODY'S GIRL"
- 04. "HORSESHOE"
