= Wait for Life =

2015 song by Emile Haynie

Single by Emile Haynie featuring Lana Del Rey

from the album We Fall
- Released: 29 January 2015
- Recorded: 2014
- Studio: Chateau Marmont (Los Angeles)
- Length: 4:52
- Label: Interscope
- Songwriters: Emile Haynie; Lana Del Rey; Thomas Bartlett
- Producer: Emile Haynie

Lana Del Rey singles chronology
| "Brooklyn Baby" (2014) | "Wait for Life" (2015) | "High by the Beach" (2015) |

Licensed audio
- "Wait for Life" on YouTube

"Wait for Life" is a song produced by American musician Emile Haynie featuring vocals from American singer-songwriter Lana Del Rey. The pair wrote the song together alongside American pianist Thomas Bartlett. The song was released as a single to promote Haynie's debut album, We Fall, on January 29, 2015. Following the release of Del Rey's 2023 album Did You Know That There's a Tunnel Under Ocean Blvd, from which the track "Sweet" interpolates a melody from "Wait for Life," the song was removed from Spotify. It was restored five days later.

== Background ==
After initial success as a producer for artists including Kanye West, Kid Cudi, and Eminem, Haynie gained notable recognition as a music producer. Through 2011 and 2012, Haynie began working with American indie pop singer Lana Del Rey, producing eight singles from her Born to Die album, namely the title-track, "Off to the Races", "Carmen", "Blue Jeans", "Summertime Sadness", "National Anthem", "Blue Velvet" and "Dark Paradise".

According to Haynie, he was struggling emotionally in 2013 and 2014, leading to him not having the same amount of involvement in Del Rey's follow-up record, Ultraviolence, as he had wanted to have: "I tried doing regular production work... one of the things that was hard at the beginning was I was supposed to be working on Lana's Ultraviolence, and she's someone who is so important to me, and I just couldn't do it. She'd written it already and she had her songs that she'd written on piano, and it would have been more of a production gig, and I just couldn't do it. I made attempts with some of these amazing artists I would have always loved to have worked with, but I just couldn't focus. Then, once it became a real thing that I was making my own album, I didn't need to do anything else."

An article in The Fader stated "When Lana came to Haynie's studio in New York for an Ultraviolence session one afternoon, the two got talking about relationships instead, and spontaneously recorded a demo. That session later became the We Fall track "Wait For Life," a song about impossible romance that's pinned around Lana's soft teasing out of the phrase, I'm lonely."

Speculation began in December 2014 about Haynie and Del Rey possibly releasing a collaborative effort together. Suspicions were confirmed in early-January when the track "Wait for Life" was confirmed.

== Composition ==
Lyrically, the song tells the story of a tragic romance which involves one person maintaining unrealistic expectations that the relationship's fate will change. Haynie revealed in an interview that We Fall is indeed a narrative that details his recovery from a shattered romance.

== Critical reception ==
Emma-Lee Moss of Vice was positive of the song, praising "Lana's husky warble on the line “All I want is to make your money grow”", further adding that it is "[one] of the simplest tracks that leave a lasting impression" Caitilin White of MTV was positive of the pairing of Del Rey's vocals and Haynie's production. Justin Block of Complex praised Haynie's choice of having Del Rey's "sultry voice blast ballads on a deep, multi-faceted track" adding that "Country western strings slide across the song's intro before transitioning into mixture of synths, orchestral strings, and sombering piano chords. Lana blesses Haynie's instrumentation with a silky-soft, airy performance." He would also encouraged the similar sound it had to Del Rey's Born to Die, adding that hit had also matured by incorporating "some of Lana's wholly downtrodden bite."

== Personnel ==
- Emile Haynie – producer, songwriter
- Lana Del Rey – lead vocals, backing vocals, songwriter
- Doveman – songwriter, piano, mellotron
- Larry Gold – woodwind, strings, horns
- Greg Leisz – pedal steele guitar

Credits adapted from the song liner notes on Genius.
