= We Fall =

Studio album by Emile Haynie
- Released: February 24, 2015
- Recorded: 2014
- Studio: Chateau Marmont, Los Angeles, California
- Genre: Indie rock
- Length: 46:06
- Label: Interscope
- Producer: Emile Haynie (also exec.)

Singles from We Fall
- 1. "Falling Apart" Released: September 16, 2014; 2. "Wait for Life" Released: January 29, 2015

We Fall is the debut album by the American music producer Emile Haynie, released on February 24, 2015, by Interscope Records. The album features guest appearances from Andrew Wyatt, Brian Wilson, Rufus Wainwright, Lana Del Rey, Charlotte Gainsbourg, Sampha, Dev Hynes, Nate Ruess, Colin Blunstone, Lykke Li, Romy Madley Croft, Randy Newman, Father John Misty, Doveman and Julia Holter.

== Background ==
Emile Haynie built his musical career producing hip hop music for Eminem, Obie Trice, Raekwon, Ghostface Killah, Proof, Remy Ma, Ice Cube and Rhymefest, among others. In 2009, Haynie teamed up with Plain Pat and Kid Cudi, to launch their record label, Dream On. In 2010, Haynie produced the song "Runaway" for Cudi's GOOD Music label-boss, Kanye West. The song quickly became a hit single, peaking at number 12 on the US Billboard Hot 100 chart. The following year, Haynie began working with American indie pop singer Lana Del Rey, producing eight singles from her Born to Die album, namely the title-track, "Off to the Races", "Carmen", "Blue Jeans", "Summertime Sadness", "National Anthem", "Blue Velvet" and "Dark Paradise". In late 2012, Bruno Mars released the single "Locked Out of Heaven" which was produced by Haynie alongside the Smeezingtons, Mark Ronson and Jeff Bhasker. "Locked Out of Heaven" went on to become certified 4× platinum by the Recording Industry Association of America (RIAA). On January 19, 2015, Haynie announced he would be releasing his debut album, We Fall. Haynie revealed We Fall, is a narrative that details his recovery from a shattered romance.

== Recording and production ==
The recording process began when Haynie traveled from his New York City home, for a stay in Los Angeles for the 56th Annual Grammy Awards, which stretched into six months in Room 39 of Chateau Marmont. To record the album, Haynie called upon his longtime friends and close colleagues he's made throughout the years in the music industry : "I made the album with mostly my friends, who knew what I was going through. I wanted to put the relationship under a microscope, and relive all my emotions, from being pissed off and hurt to a sense of relief."

== Release and promotion ==
"Falling Apart," the album's first single, featuring Andrew Wyatt and Brian Wilson, was serviced to Triple A and non-commercial radio in January. The single is also available as a 12-inch vinyl single exclusively at indie retailers with album pre-order on February 3, 2015.

On January 20, 2015, Haynie released "Wait for Life", which features vocals from Lana Del Rey, as a promotional single along with pre-order for the album.

On February 10, 2015, Haynie released "Come Find Me", featuring Lykke Li and the xx's Romy Madley Croft.

== Critical reception ==
Professional ratings
Aggregate scores
Source	Rating
Metacritic	70/100
Review scores
Source	Rating
AllMusic	4/5 stars
Los Angeles Times	7/10
The New York Times	7/10
Spin	7/10
Rolling Stone	2.5/5 stars
PopMatters	7/10 stars

At Metacritic, which assigns a normalized rating out of 100 to reviews from mainstream critics, the album has an average score of 70 based on six reviews, indicating "generally favorable reviews". Aimee Cliff of The Fader complimented the album, writing, "It's a singular achievement for a debut, and one that could only have been pulled off by Haynie, who over the last 15 years has gradually become the go-to producer for pop's biggest names."

== Track listing ==
All tracks produced by Emile Haynie, except "Falling Apart" and "A Kiss Goodbye", which were co-produced by Haynie and John Hill.

No.	Title	Writer(s)	Length
1.	"Falling Apart" (featuring Andrew Wyatt and Brian Wilson)	Emile Haynie; Wyatt	4:53
2.	"Little Ballerina" (featuring Rufus Wainwright)	Haynie; Wyatt; Nate Ruess	4:47
3.	"Wait for Life" (featuring Lana Del Rey)	Haynie; Del Rey; Thomas Bartlett	4:52
4.	"Dirty World"	Haynie	4:47
5.	"A Kiss Goodbye" (featuring Charlotte Gainsbourg, Sampha, and Dev Hynes)	Haynie; Sampha; John Hill; Annie Clark	3:46
6.	"Fool Me Too" (featuring Nate Ruess)	Haynie; Ruess; Danny Keys	4:05
7.	"Nobody Believes You" (featuring Andrew Wyatt and Colin Blunstone)	Haynie; Wyatt	4:42
8.	"Come Find Me" (featuring Lykke Li and Romy Madley Croft)	Haynie; Li	2:53
9.	"Who to Blame" (featuring Randy Newman)	Haynie; Wyatt; Roger Manning	4:32
10.	"Ballerina's Reprise" (featuring Father John Misty and Julia Holter)	Haynie; Misty; Holter	2:02
11.	"The Other Side"	Haynie	4:49
Total length:			46:06

== See also ==
- Emile Haynie production discography
