= Lana Del Rey (disambiguation) =

Lana Del Rey (born Elizabeth Woolridge Grant in 1985) is an American singer and songwriter.

Lana Del Rey may also refer to:

- Lana Del Ray (album), her self-titled debut album, 2010
- Lana Del Rey (EP), her self-titled second extended play, 2012
