= The Truth (Young Sid album) =

Studio album by Young Sid
- Released: 3 September 2007
- Recorded: 2006
- Genres: New Zealand hip hop, hardcore hip hop, rap
- Label: Move The Crowd,
- Producers: J "Cochise" Ball (exec.), Kingston Harding (exec.), Kirk Harding (co-exec.), Aron Christie (co-exec.), Justin "Juse" Ferguson (co-exec.), Emile, Shuko, Lyr1kz, FBI, Noble, Koolade

Young Sid chronology
The Truth (2007)	What Doesn't Kill Me... (2010)

The Truth is the commercial debut studio album from South Auckland, New Zealand Rapper Young Sid, released through Move The Crowd records (a subsidiary of Universal). The album was the product of Young Sid's visit to New York City in 2006 where he recorded with credited producer Cochise. After spending 16 days in the studio Young Sid returned home to New Zealand where he completed The Truth in the MTC studios.

== Track listing ==
#	Title	Producer(s)	Guest(s)	Time
1	"Redzone"	Emile		4:30
2	"Hood Like Me"	Shuko		3:29
3	"Too Much Pain"	Lyr1kz	Bradd Marquis	3:52
4	"Come And Ride"	FBI	Tyree & Chamillionaire	4:04
5	"MTC It's OVA"	Cochise & Juse	Ethical & Deach	4:27
6	"Undisputed"	Noble		3:42
7	"The Truth"	Cochise	Tyree & Mr Sicc	4:14
8	"Explosive"	Koolade	David Dallas	3:23
9	"The Axe"	Juse		3:16
10	"Hustla's Anthem"	Noble	Chong Nee	3:49
11	"Take You To The Streets"	Shuko		4:09
12	"My Letter"	Lyr1kz	Bradd Marquis	5:32
13	"Hood Like Me(Remix)"	Shuko	Tha Key, Flowz, Ethical, Louie Knuxx, NS, Fizek & Kuruption	4:47

== Awards and nominations ==
=== 2007 Nesian Vibes Awards ===
- 2007 Single of the Year ("Hood like me") - Nominated
- 2007 Hip-Hop Album of the Year ("The Truth") - Nominated

=== 2008 New Zealand Music Awards ===
- 2008 Hip-Hop Album of the Year ("The Truth") - Nominated

=== 2008 Maori Music Awards ===
- 2008 Maori Urban Album of the Year ("The Truth") - Won
