= Lana Del Rey (EP) =

EP by Lana Del Rey
- Released: January 10, 2012
- Genre: Pop
- Length: 17:19
- Labels: Stranger; Interscope
- Producers: Emile Haynie; Patrik Berger; Robopop

Lana Del Rey chronology
Lana Del Ray (2010)	Lana Del Rey (2012)	Born to Die (2012)

Lana Del Rey is the second extended play by American singer-songwriter Lana Del Rey. It was released on January 10, 2012, through Interscope Records. Having signed onto Interscope Records after the success of her debut single "Video Games", the EP was released as a teaser of Del Rey's second album Born to Die (2012). The EP's primary songwriters were Del Rey, Justin Parker and Emile Haynie, while Haynie also led the record's production. The EP debuted and peaked at number 20 on the Billboard 200, and reached number six on both the Billboard Rock Albums and Alternative Albums charts. It received mixed-to-positive reviews from music critics.

== Background ==
In June 2011, after having released her first EP Kill Kill during 2008 and first album Lana Del Rey during 2010 on 5 Points Records, Del Rey was signed by Stranger Records to release her debut single "Video Games". She told The Observer that "Video Games" was never intended to be a single, but she decided to release it as such "because it was [her] favourite". The song and its music video gained viral success, and Del Rey received the Q Award for "Next Big Thing" in October 2011. Later that month, she announced a joint record deal with Interscope Records and Polydor, and revealed in December that Born to Die would be released on January 31, 2012. To promote the upcoming release of Born to Die, Interscope Records released the digital-exclusive EP on January 10, 2012.

== Composition ==
"Blue Jeans"
A 21-second sample of the song, features Del Rey singing over a "stunted" trip-hop beat.

Lana Del Rey is a pop EP; Sputnikmusic's Winesburgohio observed how, throughout the EP, its songs drew inspiration from the music of the 1950s and 1960s while incorporating the "jarringly modern element" of sampling. "Video Games" is a slow ballad built around "eerie, seesawing piano chords"; Del Rey sang it in a low register in an attempt to differentiate it from other songs at the time. The lyrics in its verse "paints scenes of domestic tranquility", while the chorus sees Del Rey confessing her love to a man. "Born to Die" contains string arrangements and elements of hip-hop, with lyrics about making the most of fleeting love. Tim Lee of MusicOMH remarked that the two songs sounded similar, which he attributed to the intent to capitalize on the former's success.

The third track, "Blue Jeans", is a trip-hop ballad featuring a "stunted" beat and a guitar line reminiscent of surf rock. Its lyrics are about a doomed romance between the song's narrator and an absent "gangster" figure. "Off to the Races" has been lyrically described as "a freak show of inappropriate co-dependency", with a narrator whom Priya Elan of NME felt was similar to Sheryl Crow's "down and out drunken loner persona" from her 1994 single "Leaving Las Vegas". The song employs a heavy beat and bassline, and contains a hype man reminiscent of cloud rap.

== Reception ==
Winesburgohio gave the album a 4.5 out of 5 rating, commenting that while they initially did not enjoy the songs on their own, packaging them as an EP "gave them immediacy". John Bush of AllMusic rated the EP 2.5 stars out of 5, despite praising "Video Games".

In the United States, Lana Del Rey debuted and peaked at No. 20 on the Billboard 200 on the week of January 28, 2012, after selling 14,000 digital copies. The EP also peaked at No. 6 on both the Top Rock Albums and Top Alternative Albums charts, and reached No. 7 on the Digital Albums chart. As of February 1, 2012, it has sold 24,000 digital copies in the United States. Additionally, the EP reached No. 18 on the Billboard Canadian Albums chart.

== Track listing ==
Lana Del Rey track listing
No.	Title	Writer(s)	Producer(s)	Length
1.	"Video Games"	Lana Del Rey; Justin Parker	Robopop; Emile Haynie	4:03
2.	"Born to Die"	Del Rey; Parker	Haynie; Parker	4:45
3.	"Blue Jeans"	Del Rey; Haynie; Dan Heath	Haynie	3:30
4.	"Off to the Races"	Del Rey; Tim Larcombe	Patrik Berger; Haynie; Larcombe	5:01
Total length:				17:19

== Credits and personnel ==
Credits adapted from Apple Music.

Performers and instruments

- Lana Del Rey — vocals (all tracks)
- Ken Lewis — vocals (track 2)
- Emile Haynie — drums, keyboards (tracks 2–4), guitar (track 3)
- Jeff Bhasker — guitar (track 2)
- Patrik Berger — programming, guitar, bass guitar, synthesizer, percussion, sampler (track 4)
- Fredrik Syberg — violin (track 4)
- Pelle Hansen — cello (track 4)
- Erik Holm — viola (track 4)

Production

- Emile Haynie — producer (all tracks), songwriter (track 3)
- Robopop — producer (track 1), mixing engineer (track 1)
- Justin Parker — producer (track 2), songwriter (tracks 1, 2)
- Tim Larcombe — producer, songwriter (track 4)
- Patrik Berger — producer (track 4)
- Lana Del Rey — songwriter (all tracks)
- Daniel Law Heath — songwriter, conductor, string arranger (track 3)
- Larry Gold — composer, string arranger (track 2)
- Carl Bagge — string arranger (track 4)
- Brent Kolatalo — recording engineer (track 2)
- Dan Grech-Marguerat — mixing engineer (tracks 2–4)
- Duncan Fuller — assistant mixing engineer (tracks 2–4)

== Charts ==
Chart performance for Lana Del Rey
Chart (2012–2014)	Peak position
Canadian Albums (Billboard)	18
US Billboard 200	20
US Digital Albums (Billboard)	7
US Top Rock Albums (Billboard)	6
US Top Alternative Albums (Billboard)	6
