= Stuck in a Box =

Single by Young Sid featuring Stan Walker

from the album What Doesn't Kill Me... and From the Inside Out
- Released: 14 June 2010
- Genre: rap, hip-hop, soul
- Length: 3:41
- Label: Move The Crowd Records
- Songwriter(s): Emile Haynie, S. Diamond and T. Tautogia
- Producer(s): Emile

Young Sid singles chronology
| "Never Waste a Day" (2010) | "Stuck in a Box" (2010) |

Stan Walker singles chronology
| "Stand Up" (2010) | "Stuck in a Box" (2010) | "Choose You" (2010) |

"Stuck in a Box" is a single by rapper Young Sid from his second studio album, What Doesn't Kill Me..., released on 14 June 2010. It features soul singer Stan Walker.

== Chart performance ==
"Stuck in a Box" débuted on the New Zealand Singles Chart at number twenty-eight. It spent seven weeks in the chart, after peaking at number fifteen.

== Track listing ==
Digital EP
| No. | Title | Length |
|---|---|---|
| 1. | "Stuck in a Box" (featuring Stan Walker) | 3:41 |
| 2. | "What Would You Do" (featuring Tyree) | 4:05 |
| 3. | "Hard Work" | 4:46 |
