= Lana Del Ray (album) =

Studio album by Lana Del Ray
- Released: January 4, 2010
- Recorded: 2008
- Genre: Alternative pop
- Length: 47:38
- Label: 5 Points
- Producer: David Kahne

Lana Del Ray chronology
Kill Kill (2008)	Lana Del Ray (2010)	Lana Del Rey (2012)

Lana Del Ray (Note: Alternatively written as Lana Del Ray A.K.A. Lizzy Grant.) is the debut studio album by American singer-songwriter Lana Del Rey. The album was released by 5 Points Records on January 4, 2010, via the United States Amazon MP3 and iTunes Stores. The record was eventually pulled from retailers soon afterward because, according to Del Rey, the label was unable to fund it. Del Rey ultimately bought back the rights to the album. After the release of her second album, Born to Die (2012), under her stage name Lana Del Rey, she expressed her wish to re-release the album, though this never ended up happening. The album was never released physically, aside from the many bootleg vinyl pressings, CDs, and cassette tapes.

== Recording and history ==
Del Rey released a three-track extended play titled Kill Kill through 5 Points Records in October 2008, during which time she was known as Lizzy Grant. David Kahne recorded the album with Del Rey over a period of three months in 2008. "Yayo" would later be re-recorded and released again, on her 2012 extended play Paradise. Del Rey stated Kahne "is known as a producer with a lot of integrity and who had an interest in making music that wasn't just pop." Her father, Robert Grant, helped with the marketing of the album, which was available for purchase on iTunes for a brief period before being withdrawn. According to Kahne and label owner David Nichtern, Grant bought the rights back from her label, 5 Points, as she wanted it out of circulation. In an interview, Nichtern stated: "Her and her new manager came in and said, 'We want to get this off the market. We're going for a completely new deal. We'll buy you out of the deal'. So we made a separation agreement". In January 2012, upon the release of her second album, Born to Die, Del Rey stated to the BBC that she recently bought back the rights of the album and was planning on re-releasing it in the summer of 2012. In May 2012, she announced that the album would not be re-released that summer. Del Rey did however re-record and re-release "Yayo" on her Paradise EP.

On his official website, Kahne wrote about the recording process and the story behind the song "Gramma" stating, "Lizzy's Gramma is so important in her life. While we were recording, Lizzy had a picture of her Gramma holding her on her lap" and "Lizzy was crying and her Gramma has such a sweet smile on her face, in the sun at the beach."

== Background and release ==
=== Background ===
Del Rey and producer David Kahne recorded 13 tracks for the album in 2008. Instead of immediately releasing the full material, her label put out three of the tracks from the album sessions through a promotional EP titled Kill Kill on October 21, 2008, under the name Lizzy Grant. The EP was a critical success, with critics calling it poetic and elegant and the album led to Del Rey being featured as an emerging artist. Between the release of Kill Kill and the album, Del Rey expressed the desire to change her name. While on a trip to Miami, Del Rey was speaking Spanish with a few of her friends from Cuba, when they landed on "Lana Del Rey". Inspired by Lana Turner and the Ford Del Rey sedan, the name reminded Del Rey and her friends of what she called the glamour of the seaside. "It sounded gorgeous coming off the tip of the tongue" she said. Del Rey at the time opted for the alternate spelling, by spelling it R-A-Y.

=== Initial release ===
The standard album was officially released on January 4, 2010, as a digital exclusive, released only through the iTunes Store and Amazon. During the promotional campaign the album and Del Rey herself would be marketed under three names. At release time, Del Rey and the album were both named "Lana Del Ray" (R-A-Y). However, the album would also be marketed under the name "Lana Del Ray A.K.A. Lizzy Grant", which is the title featured on the album cover, with Del Rey also keeping the name "Lizzy Grant". The album was planned to have a physical release, with a minimal number of CDs being pressed to sell at live shows. During the pressing, Del Rey decided to change the spelling of her name from Lana Del Ray (R-A-Y) to Lana Del Rey (R-E-Y), leading to a small portion of the albums being printed with the new spelling. Eventually, the physical release was cancelled and the CDs were never released.

=== Cancellation and removal ===
Lana Del Ray was removed from the market three months after its initial release. Del Rey and her management made a separation agreement with 5 Points Records on April 1, 2010. After the release of her next album, Born to Die (2012), Del Rey expressed her wish to re-release the album.

On November 9, 2012, Del Rey released Born to Die: The Paradise Edition, a reissue of Born to Die, which consisted of the original deluxe album and 9 new songs which were also marketed as a separate EP, titled Paradise (2012). One of the tracks featured on Paradise was a reworked version of the song "Yayo", the original version of which was the closing track on Lana Del Ray. As of 2026, "Yayo" is the only song from Lana Del Ray to get a physical release.

== Track listing ==
All tracks are written by Elizabeth Grant, except where noted and produced by David Kahne.

Lana Del Ray track listing
No.	Title	Length
1.	"Kill Kill"	3:59
2.	"Queen of the Gas Station" (additional writer: Kahne)	3:06
3.	"Oh Say Can You See"	3:42
4.	"Gramma (Blue Ribbon Sparkler Trailer Heaven)" (additional writer: Kahne)	3:50
5.	"For K, Pt. 2"	3:26
6.	"Jump"	2:53
7.	"Mermaid Motel"	4:01
8.	"Raise Me Up (Mississippi South)"	4:24
9.	"Pawn Shop Blues" (additional writer: Kahne)	3:29
10.	"Brite Lites"	3:00
11.	"Put Me in a Movie"	3:15
12.	"Smarty" (additional writer: Kahne)	2:51
13.	"Yayo"	5:42
Total length:		47:38
