= What Doesn't Kill Me... (Young Sid album) =

Studio album by Young Sid
- Released: 3 May 2010
- Genre: New Zealand hip hop, hardcore hip hop, rap
- Label: Move The Crowd,
- Producer: Emile

Young Sid chronology
The Truth (2007)	What Doesn't Kill Me... (2010)

Singles from What Doesn't Kill Me...
- 1. "Stuck in a Box" Released: Released 14 June 2010

What Doesn't Kill Me is the second studio album by New Zealand urban rapper Young Sid. It features the singles "Never Waste a Day" and "Stuck in a Box" which features New Zealand soul singer Stan Walker. The Album was released on 3 May 2010 and since then has debuted on the RIANZ album charts on 10 May 2010 at number 16. It later peaked at number 11. It then slipped off the charts after 8 weeks in the top 40. The title alludes to the Nietzsche quote.

== Critical reception ==
Sir-Vere of Rip It Up awarded What Doesn't Kill Me... four and a half out of five stars, and praised its lyrical content and non-radio friendly "real music".

== Track listing ==
#	Title	Producer(s)	Guest(s)
1	"Made"	Twice As Nice	
2	"Never Waste A Day"	Twice As Nice	Kayo
3	"You"	Twice As Nice	Deach
4	"What Don't Kill Me"	Emile Haynie	
5	"Here Then Gone"	Twice As Nice	Melanie Fiona
6	"Around the World in a Day"	Emile Haynie	
7	"Wanna Be Like..."	Twice As Nice	
8	"Stuck in a Box"	Emile Haynie	Stan Walker
9	"The Heist"	Emile Haynie	
10	"Taken Away"	Emile Haynie	Tyree
11	"Godfather (I Won't Be Broken)"	Twice As Nice	

Deluxe album bonus tracks

- "As The World Turns" (Produced by Twice As Nice)
- "You Can Make It" feat. Mr Sicc (Produced by Twice As Nice)
- "It's Murder" (Produced by Shuko)
- "What Would You Do" feat. Tyree (Produced by Twice As Nice)
- "Hard Work" (Produced by Juse)

== Awards and nominations ==
=== 2010 New Zealand Music Awards ===
- 2010 Hip-Hop Album of the Year – Nominated

=== 2010 Māori Music Awards ===
- 2010 Māori Urban Album of the Year – Won
