= Headlights (Eminem song) =

2014 single by Eminem

Single by Eminem featuring Nate Ruess

from the album The Marshall Mathers LP 2
- Released: February 5, 2014
- Recorded: 2013
- Studio: Effigy (Ferndale, Michigan)
- Genre: Conscious hip hop; indie pop
- Length: 5:43 (album version); 4:10 (music video)
- Label: Aftermath; Shady; Interscope
- Songwriters: Marshall Mathers; Nathaniel Ruess; Emile Haynie; Jeff Bhasker; Luis Resto
- Producers: Emile Haynie; Jeff Bhasker; Eminem (add.)

Eminem singles chronology
| "The Monster" (2013) | "Headlights" (2013) | "Calm Down" (2014) |

Nate Ruess singles chronology
| "Just Give Me a Reason" (2013) | "Headlights" (2013) | "Nothing Without Love" (2015) |

Music video
- "Headlights" on YouTube

"Headlights" is a song by American rapper Eminem, featuring American singer Nate Ruess of the band Fun. It was originally released on as a fifteenth track song from the former's eighth studio album The Marshall Mathers LP 2, before it was sent to Australia as a fifth and final single on February 5, 2014.

It was written by Eminem, Emile Haynie, Jeff Bhasker, Luis Resto, and Ruess, while being produced by the former three. In the song, Eminem apologizes to his mother, Debbie Mathers, for criticizing her in his earlier songs and for showing scorn and resentment towards her in the past. The song peaked at number 45 on the Billboard Hot 100.

== Background and composition ==
"Headlights"
A 30-second sample of "Headlights" by Eminem featuring Fun's lead singer Nate Ruess from his eighth studio LP The Marshall Mathers LP 2.

Eminem had a difficult relationship with his mother since childhood. In his music, Eminem dissed her on various songs, including his breakthrough hit, "My Name Is", "Role Model", "Kill You", "My Mom", "Without Me", "Marshall Mathers", "Criminal", and most notably "Cleanin' Out My Closet." "Headlights" is an apology to his mother for the years of insults and "his plea for a united (or at least less dysfunctional) family." The title "Headlights" is a reference to their last meeting. As she drove away, he became fixated on the headlights of her car as he coped with feelings of "overwhelming sadness." He admits to his recklessness with lyrics directed towards his mom in the very first line, not really knowing his words would hurt her that much. In the song, Eminem references a few incidents from their rocky relationship, getting kicked out of the house on Christmas Eve, constant fighting, and his younger brother Nathan's removal to foster care. He also expresses regret that he has never let his mother be involved in his children's lives. In the song he acknowledges that his mother wrongfully endured the brunt of the blame for his tough upbringing and even gives her credit for her efforts to raise him as a single parent. Eminem admits that he remains estranged from his mother to this day. He also states that he cringes when he hears "Cleanin' Out My Closet" on the radio and he no longer performs it at shows.

In an interview with Sway Calloway, Eminem stated that, "everything he wanted to address" in regard to his mother is on "Headlights" and he likely will not speak on the topic outside of that particular song. He also told Zane Lowe that;

"It was one of those things that’s bothered me for a little bit. It was one of those things that I needed to get off my chest. So I don’t really have anything to elaborate or expand on that record other than everything that I needed to say, I put on that record."

Debbie Mathers (Nelson) died due to complications from lung cancer on December 2, 2024.

== Recording ==
"Headlights" was produced by Emile and Jeff Bhasker, with additional production by Eminem and additional keyboards by Luis Resto. The song was written by Eminem, Nate Ruess, Emile Haynie, Jeff Bhasker, and Luis Resto. Recording for the song was done at Effigy Studios in Ferndale, Michigan by Mike Strange, Joe Strange and Tony Campana. The song's intro, bridge, and refrain is sung by Fun.'s lead singer Nate Ruess.

== Critical reception ==
"Headlights" was met with generally positive reviews from music critics. Julie Leconte of Now said: "The track's genius partially lies in the anticipatory tension it creates in the listener. Em loves to set us up with faux sentimentality, then laugh when we’re duped. But on 'Headlights' the shoe never drops, leaving us with really sad insight into their non-relationship." Colin McGuire of PopMatters said that the song "gives us quite possibly the most touching moment Em has ever put on wax".

DJ Booth stated that "even though the hook on 'Headlights', by Fun's Nate Ruess, is light and airy exactly where it should have been deep, the raw and crushingly emotional lyrics from Eminem, especially ones that put an end to his running feud with his mother, are more than powerful enough to make 'Headlights' remarkable". Andy Gill of The Independent also praised the track, calling it "an almost shockingly apologetic love-letter to the mother he once denigrated so viciously". Edna Gundersen of USA Today stated that "it's an admirable confession" but "a so-so track".

== Music video ==
The music video was filmed in Detroit, Michigan on April 5, 2014, and directed by Academy Award winning film director Spike Lee. It was released on May 11, 2014, Mother's Day in the United States. The video takes a non-chronological look at the turbulent relationship from his mother's first-person perspective. This music video, running at 4 minutes and 10 seconds, uses the shortened version, in which Ruess' first chorus before Eminem's first verse, and the third verse (which is majorly sung by Ruess) before the end of its album version, are omitted.

== Track listing ==
| No. | Title | Writer(s) | Producer(s) | Length |
|---|---|---|---|---|
| 1. | "Headlights" | Marshall Mathers; Nathaniel Ruess; Emile Haynie; Jeff Bhasker; Luis Resto | Emile Haynie; Jeff Bhasker; Eminem^{[a]} | 5:43 |

Notes

- ^{^[a]} signifies an additional producer.

== Charts ==
=== Weekly charts ===
| Chart (2013–14) | Peak position |
|---|---|
| Australia (ARIA) | 21 |
| Australia Urban (ARIA) | 4 |
| Belgium (Ultratip Bubbling Under Flanders) | 64 |
| Belgium Urban (Ultratop Flanders) | 40 |
| Canada Hot 100 (Billboard) | 54 |
| Ireland (IRMA) | 60 |
| UK Singles (OCC) | 63 |
| UK Hip Hop/R&B (Official Charts) | 9 |
| US Billboard Hot 100 | 45 |
| US Hot R&B/Hip-Hop Songs (Billboard) | 11 |
| US Pop Airplay (Billboard) | 25 |
| US Rhythmic Airplay (Billboard) | 17 |

=== Year-end charts ===
| Chart (2014) | Position |
|---|---|
| US Hot R&B/Hip-Hop Songs (Billboard) | 67 |

== Certifications ==
| Region | Certification | Certified units/sales |
|---|---|---|
| Australia (ARIA) | 2× Platinum | 140,000^{‡} |
| New Zealand (RMNZ) | Gold | 15,000^{‡} |
| United Kingdom (BPI) | Silver | 200,000^{‡} |
| United States (RIAA) | Platinum | 1,000,000^{‡} |
^{‡} Sales+streaming figures based on certification alone.

== Release history ==
| Country | Date | Format | Label |
|---|---|---|---|
| Australia | February 5, 2014 | Contemporary hit radio | Universal Music |
| United States | March 4, 2014 | Rhythmic contemporary radio | Aftermath; Shady; Interscope |
| United States | March 4, 2014 | Contemporary hit radio | Aftermath; Shady; Interscope |
| Italy | April 11, 2014 | Contemporary hit radio | Aftermath; Interscope |
| United Kingdom | May 19, 2014 | Contemporary hit radio | Aftermath; Interscope |
