= Born to Die =

- Standard edition cover (Note: Deluxe edition cover features the Born to Die writing in a red typeface.)

Studio album by Lana Del Rey
- Released: January 27, 2012
- Studios: Studio 13 (London); Human Feel Studios (Los Angeles, CA); BMG Studios (New York City); Electric Lady (New York City); The Cutting Room (New York City)
- Genres: Alternative pop; baroque pop; trip hop; indie pop; orchestral pop; sadcore
- Length: 49:28
- Languages: English; French
- Labels: Stranger; Interscope; Polydor
- Producers: Emile Haynie; Robopop; Jeff Bhasker; Al Shux; Rick Nowels

Lana Del Rey chronology
Lana Del Rey (2012)	Born to Die (2012)	Paradise (2012)

Singles from Born to Die
- 1. "Video Games" Released: October 7, 2011; 2. "Born to Die" Released: December 30, 2011; 3. "Blue Jeans" Released: March 30, 2012; 4. "National Anthem" Released: June 15, 2012; 5. "Summertime Sadness" Released: June 22, 2012; 6. "Dark Paradise" Released: March 1, 2013

Born to Die is the second studio album by American singer-songwriter Lana Del Rey. It was released on January 27, 2012, through Interscope Records and Polydor Records as her major label debut. A reissue of the album, subtitled The Paradise Edition, was released on November 9, 2012. The new material from the reissue was also made available on a separate extended play (EP) titled Paradise.

Before the album's release, Del Rey had attracted attention with her 2011 singles "Video Games" and "Born to Die", which contrasted contemporary electronic/dance music with a cinematic sound accompanied by dramatic strings. A predominantly baroque pop and trip hop album, Born to Die features the same cinematic composition. The lyrics are about love, sex, and drugs, and feature prominent references to 1950s and 1960s Americana. The album was the world's fifth best-selling album of 2012. In 2023, it became the second album by a woman to spend more than 500 weeks on the US Billboard 200, where it peaked at number 2, and topped charts in Australia and various European countries including France, Germany, and the UK. In December 2025, Born to Die became the longest charting album by a female artist in Billboard 200 history with 618 weeks.

Born to Die was supported by four further singles: "Blue Jeans", "Summertime Sadness", "National Anthem", and "Dark Paradise". "Summertime Sadness" peaked at number 6 on the Billboard Hot 100, becoming Del Rey's highest-charting single in the US at the time. The album polarized contemporary critics; praise was directed toward the album's distinctive sound, while criticism targeted its repetitiveness and melodramatic tendencies. Del Rey's image during promotion of Born to Die was controversial; tabloid media accused her of inauthentic marketing tactics to gain an audience in the indie music scene. Despite an initially ambivalent reception, the album has been retrospectively ranked in best-of lists by several publications including The Guardian and NME, and helped Del Rey acquire cult status among music fans.

== Background and development ==
In 2007, Elizabeth "Lizzy" Grant signed a recording contract with the record label 5 Point Records, and began planning her debut studio album. But after hiring new management services, taking an interest in adopting the stage name Lana Del Ray, and a perceived lack of motivation during production, she found herself in conflict with the record label and her producer David Kahne. The final product, Lana Del Ray, was digitally released in January 2010, and her stage name was respelled Lana Del Rey shortly after its launch. Grant was successfully bought out of her recording contract at her manager's request; consequently, Lana Del Ray was pulled out of circulation before physical versions were produced.

After settling on her current stage name, Del Rey signed a recording contract with Stranger Records in June 2011, and released the track "Video Games". Initially, she had released the song because it was her "favorite" and had no intentions of releasing it as a single, although the video went viral on YouTube after its premiere. During an appearance on the French television series Taratata in November 2011, Del Rey announced that her second studio album would be titled Born to Die.

In an interview with British GQ, Del Rey revealed she was sent to boarding school in Connecticut at age 14 to get sober from alcoholism and said much of Born to Die is written about her experiences with alcohol while living in New York:

I was a big drinker at the time. I would drink every day. I would drink alone. I thought the whole concept was so fucking cool. A great deal of what I wrote on Born to Die is about these wilderness years. A lot of the time when I write about the person that I love, I feel like I'm writing about New York. And when I write about the thing that I've lost I feel like I'm writing about alcohol because that was the first love of my life. Sure, there have been people, but it's really alcohol.

The photograph used on the cover for Born to Die was shot in Carpenders Park, Watford by Nicole Nodland, while Del Rey and David Bowden oversaw the overall direction for its packaging. On behalf of Complex, Dale Eisinger ranked the cover eighth on the magazine's list of "The 50 Best Pop Album Covers of the Past Five Years", commending its usage of the typeface Steelfish and speaking favorably of the "ominous" feeling it evoked, which he credited to "the shadows or whatever the shapes in the background are [and] how properly Lana can affect her detached and still-flawless persona to a simple gaze". The album's track listing was announced on January 9, 2012, while the record was released on January 31 in the United States; it became Del Rey's first album with Interscope Records after she secured a distribution arrangement with them.

== Composition ==
"National Anthem"
A 22-second sample of the song's chorus, features Del Rey incorporating a Jessica Rabbit persona over a "lush-strings-meet-hard-beats" background.

Born to Die's music style has been described as alternative pop, "sultry, overstated orchestral pop," baroque pop, indie pop, sadcore and trip hop. Of the style of her vocals on the album, Del Rey said: "people weren't taking me very seriously, so I lowered my voice, believing that it would help me stand out. Now I sing quite low... well, for a female anyway".

The singer's first singles, "Video Games" and "Born to Die" were described variously as "quasi-cabaret balladry", "woozy and sometimes soporific soundtrack soul", and "pop". Del Rey described "Video Games" as "Hollywood sadcore". Tim Lee of musicOMH noted the songs are extremely similar, commenting that "her (alleged) agents clearly having stumbled upon a formula with which they can (allegedly) print money and (allegedly) further consign Lana's secretive, (allegedly) real debut LP to the annals of history. You didn't hear it from us, right?". Del Rey was described as a "gangsta Nancy Sinatra", although she cites Britney Spears, Elvis Presley and Antony and the Johnsons as her musical influences. When asked about her musical style, Del Rey said:

I would have loved to be part of the indie community. But I wasn't. I was looking for a community, I don't even know any people who are musicians. I never met that indie popular indie, whoever the fuck that is. Who IS indie? First of all, I can't really get my head around what indie music is. Because if you've heard of it, it's sort of pop music, right? Because it's, like, popular? Or is it just that it's not on the radio? It's not like I was in an indie community and then I blew up. It's like, I was living on the street and I'm not – like, for real, you know what I'm saying?

The lyrics of "Off to the Races" have been called "a freak show of inappropriate co-dependency", with a chorus that recalls Sheryl Crow's "down and out drunken loner persona" in her 1994 single "Leaving Las Vegas". Pryia Elan of NME noted that the track "almost falls under the weight of this persona. There's none of 'Video Games''s measured, piano-led reflection. Instead the psychosexual rumblings of the lyrics and the dual voices she uses offset the comparatively simple musical shades on display."

Del Rey's vocals on "Off to the Races", "National Anthem", and "Diet Mountain Dew" were described as "chatty" and "almost rapping". Her vocals on "Million Dollar Man" were likened to those of "a highly medicated Fiona Apple". Compared to soundtracks for James Bond films, Born to Die contains trip hop beats and a cinematic sound reminiscent of the 1950s. Thematically, Born to Die refers to sex and drugs, with Del Rey playing a Lolita-esque persona. Bill Lamb, a reviewer at About.com, wrote that "National Anthem" seems "lost in a messy blend of money, sex, and corporate greed, but it is the rousing yet graceful arrangement that solidifies the song's point of view as a clever critique of a society that is just as messy as these words". "National Anthem", Lamb says, fits into the lyrical structure of Born to Die in that the theme is that of a "bitter, albeit narcotized, criticism of all of the wealth and emotional artifice Lana Del Rey is accused of embracing". NME observed that Del Rey sings like a "perfect mannequin" on "National Anthem", criticizing the track for baldly revisiting the beat-driven chorus of "Born to Die".

== Promotion ==
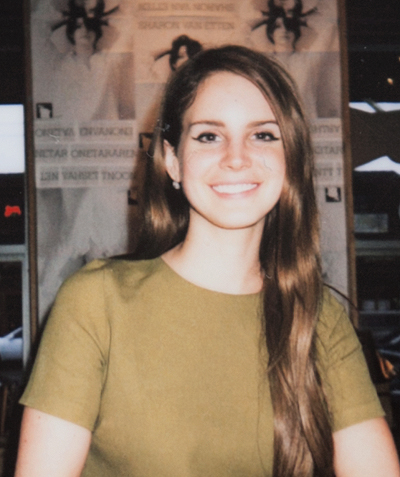
Del Rey promoting her album in March 2012, in Seattle, Washington

To promote Born to Die, Del Rey embarked on the Born to Die Tour from November 4, 2011, to September 25, 2012. Mainly consisting of concerts in Europe, the tour also visited North America and Australia.

"Video Games" was featured for the first time on The CW's Ringer on September 28, 2011, during a pivotal scene, propelling Del Rey into the mainstream. Del Rey also promoted the album with performances in a number of live appearances, including for MTV Push, and at the Bowery Ballroom, where, according to Eliot Glazer of New York, "the polarizing indie hipstress brought her 'gangsta Nancy Sinatra' swag". Matthew Perpetua of Rolling Stone commented that, despite Del Rey's nervousness and anxiety while performing live, she "sang with considerable confidence, though her transitions from husky, come-hither sexuality to bratty, girlish petulance could be rather jarring". Del Rey also performed "Video Games" on Dutch television program De Wereld Draait Door, on British music television show Later... with Jools Holland, and on a show at Chateau Marmont in Los Angeles, California.

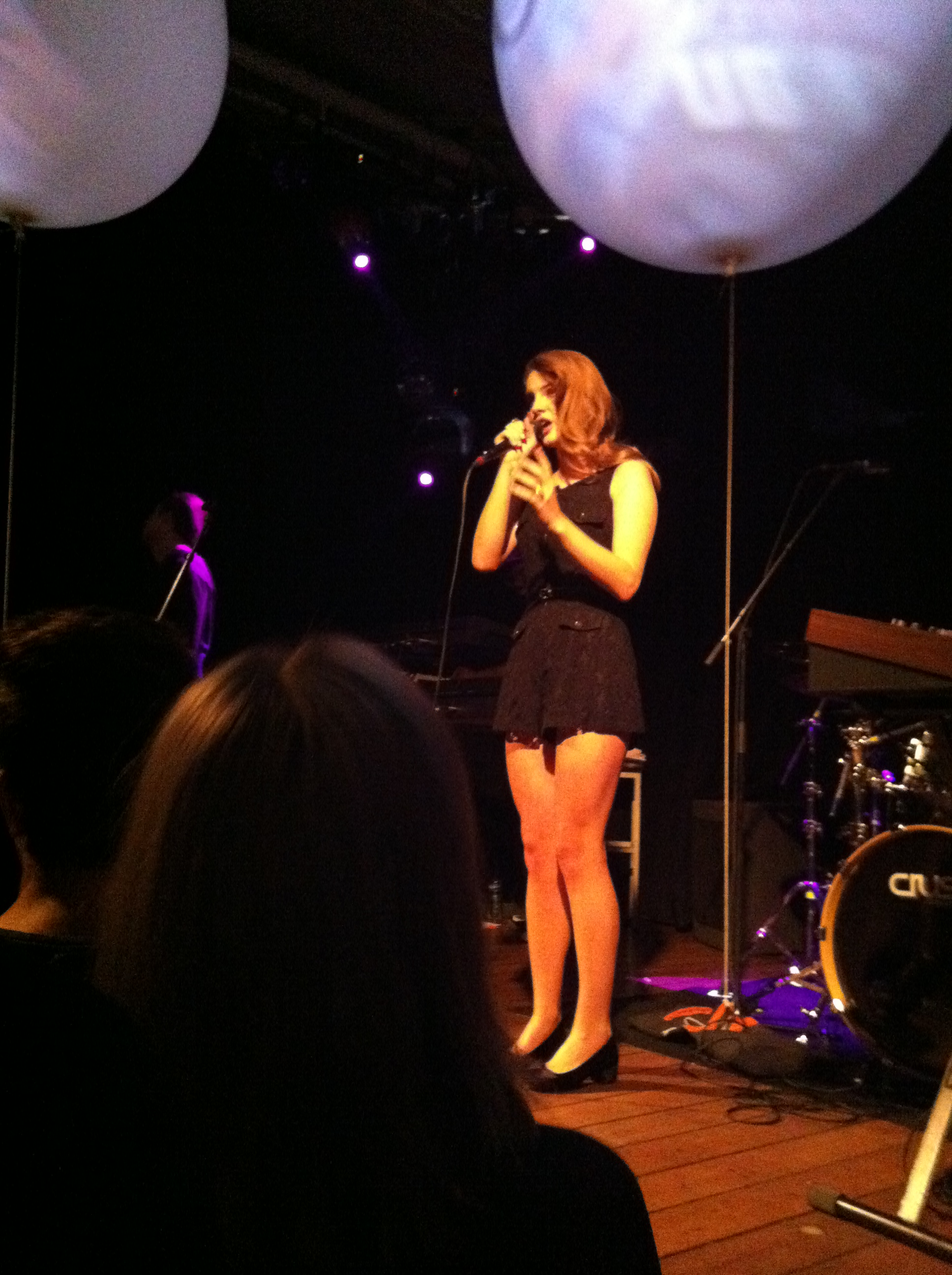
Del Rey performing during the Born to Die Tour in Amsterdam, 2011

She gave several interviews to newspapers and online magazines such as The Quietus, The Observer, and Pitchfork, while creating her own music videos for several tracks such as "Blue Jeans" and "Off to the Races". On January 14, 2012, Del Rey appeared on Saturday Night Live to perform "Blue Jeans" and "Video Games". Her performance soon came under scrutiny, and was criticized by NBC anchor Brian Williams, who called it "the worst in SNL history". SNL cast member Andy Samberg and the host of that week's episode, Daniel Radcliffe, came to her defense, with the latter stating that the criticism towards her was less about the performance and more about "her past and her family". Ringer played another Del Rey song, "Blue Jeans", on February 14, 2012, during the last scene of episode 13.

== Singles ==
"I feel like 'Video Games' and 'Blue Jeans' and 'Born to Die' are all like part of a trilogy; I had met this guy and I was really struck by him visually and when it became clear that we couldn't be together anymore, I just knew in my heart that I would still honor that relationship for a long time... It was just more about living in the memories of the best of the past and just honoring that time."

— Lana Del Rey

"Video Games" was released as Del Rey's debut single on October 10, 2011. The song received mostly positive reviews from critics, who praised Del Rey's vocals and considered it one of the best songs of 2011. "Video Games" attained worldwide success, reaching number one in Germany and top-ten positions in Austria, Belgium, Czech Republic, France, Netherlands, Ireland, Poland, Scotland, Switzerland and the United Kingdom. An accompanying music video, directed and edited by Del Rey, contained video clips of skateboarders, cartoons, shots from old afties, and paparazzi footage of Paz de la Huerta falling down while intoxicated. The music video helped increase Del Rey's online popularity. The second single and title track, "Born to Die", was released as a digital download on December 30, 2011. The music video for it leaked on December 14, and was based on a concept Del Rey created, directed by Yoann Lemoine. Rolling Stone gave the video a generally favorable review.

Del Rey announced "Blue Jeans" as the third single from the album. It was officially released on April 6, 2012. An accompanying music video directed by Lemoine premiered around the web on March 19, 2012. "Summertime Sadness" was released as the fourth single on June 22. The official music video was released on July 20. "National Anthem" was announced as the fifth single and released on July 6. Its music video was released on June 27. "Dark Paradise" was released as the final single on March 1, 2013, only in Germany, Switzerland, Austria and Poland.

"Radio" charted at number 67 in France. "Without You" debuted at number 121 in the UK. "Off to the Races" was released as a promotional single in The Netherlands on January 6, 2012. A music video, directed by Del Rey, was released on December 22, 2011. "Carmen" was released as a promotional single in Germany, Austria, and Switzerland on January 26, 2012. On February 27, 2012, Del Rey revealed on Facebook that the video for "Carmen" was shot and would be finished being edited that day. It was released on April 21, 2012.

== Critical reception ==
Professional ratings
Aggregate scores
Source	Rating
AnyDecentMusic?	6.2/10
Metacritic	62/100
Review scores
Source	Rating
AllMusic	2.5/5 stars
Chicago Tribune	2/4 stars
The Daily Telegraph	4/5 stars
Entertainment Weekly	C+
The Guardian	4/5 stars
The Independent	2/5 stars
NME	8/10
Pitchfork	5.5/10
Rolling Stone	2/5 stars
Spin	6/10

=== Initial reviews ===
At Metacritic, which assigns a weighted mean rating out of 100 to reviews from mainstream critics, the album received an average score of 62 based on 37 reviews, indicating "generally favorable reviews".

Jaime Gill of BBC Music commented that the album "isn't perfect", criticizing the production of songs such as "Dark Paradise", but concluded that Born to Die is the most distinctive debut album since Glasvegas's eponymous disc released in 2008. Slant Magazine writer Sal Cinquemani commented that several tracks had their production changed for the album, making tracks such as "National Anthem" and "This Is What Makes Us Girls" less "radio-friendly". Cinquemani wrote, "ironically, the album's sole weakness is the strength of its immaculate production, which can be a bit overwhelming over the course of 12 tracks." Alexis Petridis of The Guardian said that Born to Die is "beautifully turned pop music, which is more than enough", with most melodies "constructed magnificently", but that Del Rey "doesn't have the lyrical equipment to develop a persona throughout the album." Greg Kot of the Chicago Tribune gave a negative review, criticizing the repetitive production.

Rob Sheffield of Rolling Stone declared that the lyrics, with their "pop-trash perversity", were the strength of the album, but that Del Rey had a voice that was "pinched and prim" and "wasn't ready to make an album yet". He concluded, "Given her chic image, it's a surprise how dull, dreary and pop-starved Born to Die is." AllMusic critic John Bush wrote: "There is a chasm that separates 'Video Games' from the other material and performances on the album, which aims for exactly the same target—sultry, sexy, wasted—but with none of the same lyrical grace, emotional power, or sympathetic productions... an intriguing start, but Del Rey is going to have to hit the books if she wants to stay as successful as her career promised early on". Channing Freeman of Sputnikmusic disliked the album, saying, "The worst thing about Born to Die is that even its great songs contain problems". The Observer's Kitty Empire said that, unlike pop singers Lady Gaga and Katy Perry and their "hedonic outpourings", "Lana Del Rey's partying is fuelled by a knowing sadness, and sung in that laconic, hypnotic voice, which ultimately saves this thoroughly dissolute, feminist nightmare of a record for the romantics among us".

The A.V. Club's Evan Rytlewski panned the album, writing, "Shallow and overwrought, with periodic echoes of Kesha's Valley Girl aloofness, the album lives down to the harshest preconceptions against pop music". Randall Roberts of Los Angeles Times also noted that Del Rey's vocals have "so much potential and yet [are] unrefined", and said that despite having standout tracks like "Summertime Sadness" and "Dark Paradise", listening to the album "has become tiring and woozy, like if you'd taken a half-dozen Ambiens when you'd put the record on—and now you're getting very, very sleepy". Pitchfork's Lindsay Zoladz commented: "The album's point of view—if you could call it that—feels awkward and out of date... [it] never allows tension or complexity into the mix, and its take on female sexuality ends up feeling thoroughly tame. For all of its coos about love and devotion, it's the album equivalent of a faked orgasm—a collection of torch songs with no fire". Alex Denney of NME gave a positive review, saying: "Although it's not quite the perfect pop record 'Video Games' might have led us to wish for, Born to Die still marks the arrival of a fresh—and refreshingly self-aware—sensibility in pop."

=== Retrospective acclaim ===
Born to Die has received retrospective reviews through the years, with many critics and journalists giving it a second chance and publishing think-pieces about the industry's perspective on Del Rey. Meaghan Garvey, writing for Pitchfork, said that "it’s a drag to rehash the Born to Die discourse now [...] a conversation so tediously narrow," praising the album as "thrillingly rich." In 2021, Pitchfork included it in their "Rescored" list, with Anna Gaca claiming that "Born to Die turned out to be a sign of things to come, like genre-agnostic pop ballads with hip-hop beats, and the arch, depressive languor that’s more mainstream than ever." Craig Jenkins from Vulture agreed, stating that "in retrospect, it was a dumb conversation." He added that Born to Die "came from nowhere with a fully formed [...] aesthetic that was perhaps too much too soon," arguing that "it felt time-displaced and familiar all at once, like discovering a [...] cassette tape from that part of the 90s where trip hop invaded pop." Dan Solomon, writing for CultureMap, asked to fellow music critics to "keep [the controversy] in the past," arguing that it is "simplistic to dismiss Born to Die." He described the album as "easy to listen to," and "great-sounding," while praising "Off to the Races" as "a self-assured performance from a singer in control of her voice, a mix of acting and singing." He also called "Dark Paradise" and "Summertime Sadness" standouts. In a similar opinion, Grantland's Alex Pappademas questioned if "there [was] any way to separate the Internet hatred of Lana Del Rey from her sort of surprisingly good album."

Chris Lacy from Albumism stated that "it's crystal-clear [Del Rey] is the mastermind behind Born to Die," describing the album as a "realistic portrait of addiction, sexual obsession, abnormality and fear." He also praised the album's music videos, calling them "epic short films that were thought-provoking" and that they "would've made Michael Jackson proud." However, he noted that the album "loses steam midway," calling closing track "This Is What Makes Us Girls" a "saving grace." Jesse Cataldo from Slant Magazine named Born to Die Del Rey's second best album in 2021, describing it as a "startlingly composed premiere effort." Miranda Mikkola from Gay Times called Born to Die "one of the greatest major-label debut albums of the century," stating that "it's still a gorgeous album that we love to revisit every now and then," while marking "Off to the Races", "National Anthem" and "Dark Paradise" as standouts. On a similar note, Angelina Fay from No Majesty agreed that the album is "still great to rediscover" and praised it as "timeless in every sense of the word." Rhian Daly, writing for NME, argued that Del Rey "was too special to live in the shadows of other artists [...] she just had to find her path to that point." Rob Harvilla from The Ringer had a rather mixed retrospective review, writing that Born to Die was "spotty but occasionally excellent" and rating it as "her worst album." However, he called "Video Games" "an alarmingly great song", described "Radio" as "gorgeous" and praised Del Rey as "the perfect artist of our times." Billboard included the title track in their Songs That Defined the Decade list and called it "one of the most standout musical moments on the album."

== Accolades ==
=== Awards ===
Year	Organization	Award	Result	Ref.
2012	GAFFA Awards (Denmark)	International Album of the Year	Won	
2012	GAFFA Awards (Norway)	International Album of the Year	Won	
2013	Swiss Music Awards	Best Album Pop / Rock International	Nominated	
2013	Xbox Entertainment Awards	Best Album	Won	
2014	Billboard Music Awards	Top Rock Album	Nominated	

=== Year-end lists ===
Publication	List	Rank	Ref.
NME	50 Best Albums of 2012	45	
Slant	25 Best Albums of 2012	9	
Fact	The 50 Best Albums of 2012	19	
The Guardian	Best Albums of 2012	17	
Complex	The 50 Best Albums of 2012	4	
Uncut	Uncut's Top 75 New Albums of 2012	51	

=== Decade-end lists ===
Publication	List	Rank	Ref.
Billboard	The 20 Best Albums of 2010s (So Far)	20	
Billboard	The 100 Greatest Albums of the 2010s	31	
NME	NME's Greatest Albums of the Decade: The 2010s	10	
Uproxx	All the Best Albums of the 2010s	97	
The Independent	The 50 Best Albums of the Decade	3	
Noisey	The 100 Best Albums of the 2010s	18	
The Guardian	The 100 Best Albums of the 21st Century	70	
Stereogum	100 Best Albums of the 2010s	40	

== Commercial performance ==
In the United Kingdom, Born to Die sold 50,000 copies on its first day of release. It debuted at number one on the UK Albums Chart and sold 116,745 copies. By accumulating digital sales of 50,007, the album became the fifth album ever to sell upwards of 50,000 downloads in a single week. Additionally, it was the fastest selling album of 2012, becoming the first album to reach 100,000 copies sold in that year. Born to Die remained atop the chart in its second week, selling an additional 60,000 copies. In the UK, the album was certified six-times platinum and by March 2023 had sold 1.4 million copies. On the UK albums chart, Born to Die's chart run and sales were combined with the release of Paradise.

In France, the album debuted at number one on the French Albums Chart with sales of 48,791, whose 16,968 digital copies. The album remained at the top position the following week with 23,888 copies sold. With over 1,000,000 copies sold as of September 2019, it is one of the best-selling albums in France of all time. In New Zealand, the album debuted and peaked at number two on the charts, spending forty weeks in the chart. After the conjunction of Born to Die: The Paradise Edition, the album charted at number six. "Born to Die" is the fifty-seventh best charting album of all time in New Zealand.

In the United States, the album attained first-week sales of 77,000 copies, subsequently debuting at number two on the Billboard 200, behind Adele's 21, and shipped over 500,000 units in the country by January 2013, getting Gold certification. On the week ending August 31, 2013, though the album was in its eighty-first week on the chart, it re-entered the top twenty at number 20, selling 13,000 copies. As of January 2024, Born to Die has sold 2.3 million copies in the United States, and has been certified five-times platinum by the RIAA for album units equivalent to five million.

According to the International Federation of the Phonographic Industry (IFPI), Born to Die was the fifth global best-selling album of 2012 with sales of 3.4 million copies. By June 2014, the album had sold seven million copies worldwide.

== Legacy ==
"It's common knowledge, at this point, that Lana Del Rey is Lizzy Grant's invented persona, an entirely new character that she created when her own music didn't seem to be going anywhere [...] But when 'Video Games' hit as hard and as early as it did, she suddenly had to rush out an album, and she didn't have the luxury of figuring out the different directions that this character could go."

— Tom Breihan of Stereogum

With the release of Born to Die, Del Rey became the main focus of attention of the press for her image as well as her music. Since her debut with "Video Games", Del Rey had been causing many to begin to accuse her of trying to erase her past with a different type of songs and style. Considering the album's composition and her appearance, many tabloids began to question her authenticity and claim that her success was due only to her beauty. Also, speculation arose that Del Rey was just a character created by Lizzy Grant and pop music industry, with her label trying to get a place and audience within indie music.

Business Insider's Kevin Lincoln commented that Lana was manufactured by her label and used "Video Games" as a form of advertising. In defense of the singer, Jaime Gill from BBC Music wrote: "If you want an explanation for the unlikely rise of Lana Del Rey, it isn't that hard to find. Ignore accusations of cynical marketing and inauthenticity, or speculation about surgery and daddy's money – that's not important. And don't get distracted by YouTube statistics or the hyperbole, this isn't about new media. It's about something older and more mysterious than that; the extraordinary, resilient power of pop music". Sasha Frere Jones of The New Yorker came out in defense of the artist as well, writing: "The weirder strain of criticism concerns authenticity [...] Detractors cite a variety of presumed conspiracies, some involving the influence of her father, Rob Grant [...] The rumor of manipulative managers guiding her; the reality of professional songwriters working for her [...] and how Grant's top lip got so big so fast [...] Surely no equivalent male star would be subject of the same level of examination." Sharing a similar view, Ann Lee wrote in Metro: "I know it's fun to slate [Lana] but she's got a great voice – that's a fact". Sal Cinquemani of Slant Magazine also proved to be in favor of Del Rey, declaring: "I was initially puzzled by the accusations of inauthenticity that were hurled with such vehemence and frequency at Lana Del Rey in the wake of her meteoric rise to it girl status last year [...] And I guess we're supposed to lament the fact that, unlike Amy Winehouse, she doesn't appear to have a predilection for dope or booze to back up her supposed bad-girl bona fides. But since when exactly has 'authenticity' ever been a criterion in pop music?".

=== Global impact on pop-music ===
Born to Die's sound, themes and aesthetic left a major impact in popular music. In 2019, The Washington Post named Del Rey one of the "five people who helped shape the culture of the past decade." Max Migowsky from Indie described her as "the figurehead of an entire generation," while Zachary Small from Hyperallergic called Born to Die "ahead of its time." Al Horner from Red Bull agreed, marking Born to Die as "[a] blueprint for a new sonic world" and describing its sound as the feminine equivalent of grunge music. He argued that Del Rey's success "convinced record labels to take a chance on [...] emotionally vulnerable pop" and stated that "there's never been more space for melancholy in popular music." Sorrell Forbes from uDiscover Music named Born to Die "the most powerful moment in her career," while arguing that Del Rey brought "the sound [the public was] looking for." Del Rey herself stated in an interview with Pitchfork in 2019 that "there's been a major sonic shift culturally. I think I had a lot to do with that." Omar N. Goulding from Culturizando called Born to Die "the most influential album of the decade," arguing that "people were getting tired of happy music and wanted to listen to something different" and that Del Rey "set the [sad girl] trend into pop culture." Richard S. He, writing for Billboard, said that Born to Die is "one of the main catalysts for pop's mid-2010s shift from brash EDM to a moodier, hip-hop-inflected palette." Billboard later included the album's title track as one of the 100 songs that defined the 2010s, adding that it influenced "a sonic shift that completely changed the pop landscape." Critics and journalists alike agree that Born to Die influenced the works of Lorde, Billie Eilish, Miley Cyrus and Taylor Swift, among others. Swift herself named Del Rey the "most influential artist in pop."

Born to Die was listed among publications' best-of lists of the 2010s decade, including NME (No. 10) and The Independent (No. 3). The Guardian included the album at number 70 on its 2019 list of The 100 Best Albums of the 21st Century.

== Track listing ==
Credits adapted from the liner notes of Born to Die.

Standard edition
No.	Title	Writer(s)	Producer(s)	Length
1.	"Born to Die"	Elizabeth Grant; Justin Parker	Emile Haynie; Parker^{[b]}	4:46
2.	"Off to the Races"	Grant; Tim Larcombe	Patrik Berger; Haynie	5:00
3.	"Blue Jeans"	Grant; Haynie; Dan Heath	Haynie	3:30
4.	"Video Games"	Grant; Parker	Robopop	4:42
5.	"Diet Mountain Dew"	Grant; Mike Daly	Haynie; Jeff Bhasker^{[a]}; Daly^{[b]}	3:43
6.	"National Anthem"	Grant; Parker; David Sneddon; James Bauer-Mein	Haynie; Bhasker^{[c]}; Sneddon^{[b]}; Bauer-Mein^{[b]}	3:51
7.	"Dark Paradise"	Grant; Rick Nowels	Haynie; Nowels^{[a]}	4:03
8.	"Radio"	Grant; Parker	Haynie; Parker^{[c]}	3:34
9.	"Carmen"	Grant; Parker	Haynie; Bhasker^{[c]}; Parker^{[b]}	4:08
10.	"Million Dollar Man"	Grant; Chris Braide	Haynie; Braide	3:51
11.	"Summertime Sadness"	Grant; Nowels	Haynie; Nowels^{[a]}	4:25
12.	"This Is What Makes Us Girls"	Grant; Larcombe; Jim Irvin	Haynie; Al Shux	3:58
Total length:				49:28

Deluxe edition
No.	Title	Writer(s)	Producer(s)	Length
13.	"Without You"	Grant; Sacha Skarbek	Haynie	3:49
14.	"Lolita"	Grant; Liam Howe; Hannah Robinson	Haynie; Howe^{[a]}	3:40
15.	"Lucky Ones"	Grant; Nowels	Haynie; Nowels^{[a]}	3:45
Total length:				60:40

=== Notes ===
- ^{^[a]} signifies a co-producer
- ^{^[b]} signifies a vocal producer
- ^{^[c]} signifies an additional producer
- Target edition includes the bonus tracks "Without You" and "Lolita" on the standard edition.
- North America iTunes Store and Japan editions include the Joy Orbison Remix of "Video Games".
- French FnacMusic edition includes the White Lies C-Mix of "Video Games", and the French digital reissue the Woodkid and The Shoes Remix of "Born to Die".
- The Paradise Edition includes the EP Paradise on disc two.

== Personnel ==
Credits adapted from the liner notes of Born to Die.

=== Performance credits ===
- Lana Del Rey – vocals (all tracks)
- Emilie Bauer-Mein – backing vocals (track 6)
- James Bauer-Mein – backing vocals (track 6)
- Lenha Labelle – French vocals (track 9)
- David Sneddon – backing vocals (track 6)
- Hannah Robinson – backing vocals (track 14)

=== Instruments ===
- Patrik Berger – guitar, bass guitar, percussion, synthesizer, sampler, drum programming (track 2)
- Jeff Bhasker – guitar (tracks 1, 5, 6); keyboards (track 5); additional keyboards (track 6, 9); additional strings (track 9)
- Chris Braide – guitar, acoustic piano, strings, drum programming (track 10)
- Pelle Hansen – cello (track 2)
- Emile Haynie – drums (tracks 1, 2, 3, 5, 6, 7, 8, 10, 11, 12, 13, 15); keyboards (tracks 1, 2, 6, 7, 8, 9, 11, 13, 15); additional keyboards (tracks 2, 5, 10, 12); guitar (tracks 3, 8, 9, 13, 15)
- Dan Heath – flute (track 11), additional strings (track 13)
- Erik Holm – viola (track 2)
- Liam Howe – additional keyboards, programming (track 14)
- Devrim Karaoglu – additional synthesizer, orchestral drums (track 7); additional pads (track 11)
- Brent Kolatalo – additional drums (track 5)
- Ken Lewis – additional vocal noises (track 1); additional drums (track 5)
- Rick Nowels – guitar (track 7); additional strings (track 11); keyboards (track 15)
- Dean Reid – pads (track 7)
- Al Shux – guitar, bass guitar, keyboards, programming (track 12)
- Sacha Skarbek – omnichord (track 13)
- Fredrik Syberg – violin (track 2)
- Patrick Warren – chamberlain strings (track 7); additional strings (track 11); guitar, keyboards (tracks 11, 15); strings, secondary strings (track 15)

=== Production ===
- Carl Bagge – string arrangements (track 2)
- Patrik Berger – production (track 2)
- Jeff Bhasker – co-production (track 5), additional production (tracks 6, 9)
- Chris Braide – production (track 10)
- Lorenzo Cosi – engineering (track 13)
- Mike Daly – vocal production (track 5)
- John Davis – mastering (all tracks)
- Duncan Fuller – mixing assistant (tracks 1, 2, 3, 8, 10, 11, 13)
- Chris Galland – mixing assistant (tracks 5, 6, 7, 12, 15)
- Larry Gold – string arrangements, conductor (tracks 1, 5, 6, 7, 8, 9, 11, 12, 13, 15)
- Dan Grech-Marguerat – mixing (tracks 1, 2, 3, 8, 10, 11, 13, 14)
- Nicole Nodland – photography
- Mat Maitland – design
- Emile Haynie – production (tracks 1, 2, 3, 5, 6, 7, 8, 9, 10, 11, 12, 13, 14, 15)
- Dan Heath – string arrangements, conductor (tracks 3, 6)
- Liam Howe – co-production (track 14)
- Brent Kolatalo – additional recording (track 1)
- Erik Madrid – mixing assistant (tracks 5, 6, 7, 12, 15)
- Manny Marroquin – mixing (tracks 5, 6, 7, 12, 15)
- Kieron Menzies – engineering (track 15)
- The Nexus – vocal production (track 6)
- Rick Nowels – co-production (tracks 7, 11, 15); vocal production (track 15)
- Justin Parker – vocal production (tracks 1, 9); additional production (track 8)
- Robopop – production, mixing (track 4)
- Al Shux – production, vocal production (track 12)
- Steve Tirpak – string assistant (tracks 1, 5, 6, 7, 8, 9, 11, 12, 13, 15)

== Charts ==
=== Weekly charts ===
Chart (2012–2025)	Peak position
Australian Albums (ARIA)	1
Austrian Albums (Ö3 Austria)	1
Belgian Albums (Ultratop Flanders)	2
Belgian Albums (Ultratop Wallonia)	1
Canadian Albums (Billboard)	3
Croatian Albums (HDU)	3
Czech Albums (ČNS IFPI)	5
Danish Albums (Hitlisten)	3
Dutch Albums (Album Top 100)	2
Finnish Albums (Suomen virallinen lista)	5
French Albums (SNEP)	1
German Albums (Offizielle Top 100)	1
Greek Albums (IFPI)	1
Hungarian Albums (MAHASZ)	16
Irish Albums (IRMA)	1
Italian Albums (FIMI)	5
Japanese Albums (Oricon)	35
Mexican Albums (Top 100 Mexico)	34
New Zealand Albums (RMNZ)	2
Norwegian Albums (VG-lista)	1
Polish Albums (ZPAV)	2
Portuguese Albums (AFP)	3
Russian Albums (2M)	4
Scottish Albums (Official Charts)	1
South African Albums (RISA)	14
South Korean Albums (Gaon) Deluxe edition	79
Spanish Albums (Promusicae)	7
Swedish Albums (Sverigetopplistan)	14
Swiss Albums (Schweizer Hitparade)	1
UK Albums (Official Charts)	1
US Billboard 200	2
US Digital Albums (Billboard)	1
US Top Rock Albums (Billboard)	1
US Top Alternative Albums (Billboard)	1
US Top Catalog Albums (Billboard)	3
US Indie Store Album Sales (Billboard)	2
US Vinyl Albums (Billboard)	1

=== Year-end charts ===
Chart (2012)	Position
Australian Albums (ARIA)	14
Austrian Albums (Ö3 Austria)	6
Belgian Albums (Ultratop Flanders)	2
Belgian Albums (Ultratop Wallonia)	8
Danish Albums (Hitlisten)	14
Dutch Albums (Album Top 100)	33
French Albums (SNEP)	7
German Albums (Offizielle Top 100)	4
Hungarian Albums (MAHASZ)	72
Irish Albums (IRMA)	6
Italian Albums (FIMI)	37
New Zealand Albums (RMNZ)	11
Polish Albums (ZPAV)	3
Russian Albums (2M)	5
Spanish Albums (PROMUSICAE)	29
Swiss Albums (Schweizer Hitparade)	2
UK Albums (OCC)	4
US Billboard 200	70
US Top Alternative Albums (Billboard)	14
US Top Rock Albums (Billboard)	21
Worldwide	5

Chart (2013)	Position
Australian Albums (ARIA)	76
Danish Albums (Hitlisten)	59
French Albums (SNEP)	40
German Albums (Offizielle Top 100)	77
Hungarian Albums (MAHASZ)	61
Italian Albums (FIMI)	67
New Zealand Albums (RMNZ)	34
Spanish Albums (PROMUSICAE)	29
Swiss Albums (Schweizer Hitparade)	29
UK Albums (OCC)	59
US Billboard 200	53
US Top Alternative Albums (Billboard)	7
US Top Rock Albums (Billboard)	10

Chart (2014)	Position
Italian Albums (FIMI)	73
Mexican Albums (Top 100 Mexico)	78
UK Albums (OCC)	68
US Billboard 200	56
US Top Alternative Albums (Billboard)	9
US Top Rock Albums (Billboard)	11
US Alternative Albums	9

Chart (2015)	Position
US Billboard 200	62

Chart (2016)	Position
Polish Albums (ZPAV)	98
US Billboard 200	116

Chart (2017)	Position
US Billboard 200	143
US Top Alternative Albums (Billboard)	17
US Top Rock Albums (Billboard)	26

Chart (2018)	Position
US Top Alternative Albums (Billboard)	16
US Top Rock Albums (Billboard)	32

Chart (2019)	Position
Top Alternative Albums (Billboard)	15
US Top Rock Albums (Billboard)	35

Chart (2020)	Position
Belgian Albums (Ultratop Wallonia)	187
US Billboard 200	176
US Top Alternative Albums (Billboard)	8
US Top Rock Albums (Billboard)	20

Chart (2021)	Position
Belgian Albums (Ultratop Flanders)	100
Belgian Albums (Ultratop Wallonia)	174
Polish Albums (ZPAV)	69
US Billboard 200	151
US Top Alternative Albums (Billboard)	11
US Top Rock Albums (Billboard)	22

Chart (2022)	Position
Belgian Albums (Ultratop Flanders)	62
Belgian Albums (Ultratop Wallonia)	117
German Albums (Offizielle Top 100)	88
Lithuanian Albums (AGATA)	43
Polish Albums (ZPAV)	30
UK Albums (OCC)	70
US Billboard 200	116
US Top Alternative Albums (Billboard)	10
US Top Rock Albums (Billboard)	26

Chart (2023)	Position
Australian Albums (ARIA)	48
Austrian Albums (Ö3 Austria)	17
Belgian Albums (Ultratop Flanders)	34
Belgian Albums (Ultratop Wallonia)	46
Danish Albums (Hitlisten)	90
Dutch Albums (Album Top 100)	36
German Albums (Offizielle Top 100)	27
Hungarian Albums (MAHASZ)	20
New Zealand Albums (RMNZ)	44
Polish Albums (ZPAV)	30
Swedish Albums (Sverigetopplistan)	77
Swiss Albums (Schweizer Hitparade)	41
UK Albums (OCC)	28
US Billboard 200	48
US Top Alternative Albums (Billboard)	4

Chart (2024)	Position
Australian Albums (ARIA)	54
Austrian Albums (Ö3 Austria)	9
Belgian Albums (Ultratop Flanders)	35
Belgian Albums (Ultratop Wallonia)	43
Dutch Albums (Album Top 100)	45
German Albums (Offizielle Top 100)	13
Hungarian Albums (MAHASZ)	29
Polish Albums (ZPAV)	92
Swiss Albums (Schweizer Hitparade)	23
UK Albums (OCC)	36
US Billboard 200	57

Chart (2025)	Position
Austrian Albums (Ö3 Austria)	15
Belgian Albums (Ultratop Flanders)	64
Belgian Albums (Ultratop Wallonia)	91
Dutch Albums (Album Top 100)	80
German Albums (Offizielle Top 100)	19
Hungarian Albums (MAHASZ)	40
Swiss Albums (Schweizer Hitparade)	31
UK Albums (OCC)	51
US Billboard 200	94

=== Decade-end charts ===
Chart (2010–2019)	Position
Australian Albums (ARIA)	60
Norwegian Albums (VG-lista)	16
UK Albums (OCC)	34
UK Vinyl Albums (OCC)	64
US Billboard 200	117

== Certifications ==
Region	Certification	Certified units/sales
Argentina	Gold	
Australia (ARIA)	4× Platinum	280,000^{‡}
Austria (IFPI Austria)	5× Platinum	100,000^{*}
Belgium (BRMA)	Platinum	30,000^{*}
Brazil (Pro-Música Brasil)	Platinum	40,000^{*}
Canada (Music Canada)	5× Platinum	400,000^{‡}
Colombia	Gold	
Denmark (IFPI Danmark)	5× Platinum	100,000^{‡}
France (SNEP)	Diamond	1,000,000
Germany (BVMI)	5× Platinum	1,000,000^{‡}
Hungary (MAHASZ)	Gold	3,000^{^}
Ireland (IRMA)	2× Platinum	30,000^{^}
Italy (FIMI)	3× Platinum	150,000^{‡}
Mexico (AMPROFON)	Platinum+Gold	90,000^{^}
New Zealand (RMNZ)	7× Platinum	105,000^{‡}
Norway (IFPI Norway)	Gold	15,000^{*}
Poland (ZPAV)	Diamond	100,000^{*}
Portugal (AFP)	2× Platinum	30,000^{^}
Russia (NFPF)	Platinum	10,000^{*}
Singapore (RIAS)	Gold	5,000^{*}
Spain (Promusicae)	Platinum	40,000^{^}
Sweden (GLF)	Gold	20,000^{‡}
Sweden (GLF) "The Paradise Edition"	2× Platinum	80,000^{‡}
Switzerland (IFPI Switzerland)	2× Platinum	60,000^{^}
United Kingdom (BPI)	6× Platinum	1,800,000^{‡}
United States (RIAA)	5× Platinum	5,000,000^{‡}
Summaries
Europe (IFPI)	2× Platinum	2,000,000^{*}
^{*} Sales figures based on certification alone.^{^} Shipments figures based on certification alone.^{‡} Sales+streaming figures based on certification alone.

== Release history ==
Region	Date	Format	Edition	Label	Ref.
Germany	January 27, 2012	CD; digital download; LP	Standard; Deluxe	Universal Music	
Ireland	January 27, 2012	CD; digital download; LP	Standard; Deluxe	Polydor	
France	January 30, 2012	CD; digital download	Standard; Deluxe	Universal Music	
United Kingdom	January 30, 2012	CD; digital download; LP	Standard; Deluxe	Polydor	
United States	January 31, 2012	CD; digital download	Standard; Deluxe	Stranger; Interscope	
Australia	February 3, 2012	CD	Standard; Deluxe	Universal Music	
Japan	February 8, 2012	CD; CD/DVD; digital download	Standard; Deluxe	Universal Music	
United States	February 21, 2012	LP	Standard; Deluxe	Stranger; Interscope	
