= Sid Diamond =

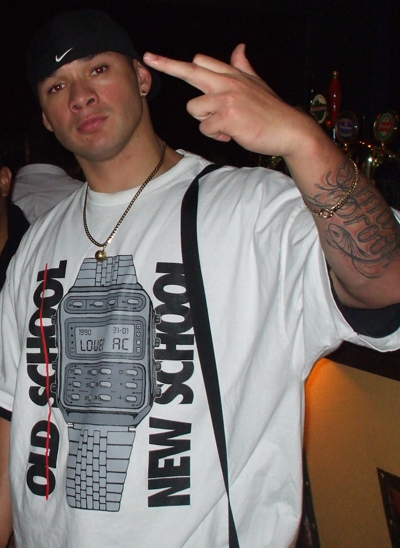
- Diamond in Dunedin, Otago in 2008

Background information
- Also known as: Sid Diamond, Young Sid
- Born: Sidney Diamond; 7 July 1986 (age 40); Auckland, New Zealand
- Genres: Trip hop, New Zealand hip hop
- Years active: 2005–present
- Label: Move The Crowd Records
- Website: http://www.movethecrowd.co.nz/

Sidney Diamond (born 7 July 1986), previously known by the stage name Young Sid, is a New Zealand rapper.

== Biography ==
Sid Diamond was born in South Auckland, New Zealand and later moved to Manukau City, Auckland. He is of Cook Island and Māori descent, and was raised in the Manukau suburb of Ōtara. Diamond's father, Vincent George, was the president of a gang called the Tribesmen, and his mother, Victoria, was an alcoholic who died of lung cancer in 2009. His older brother, Karlos, who is currently imprisoned, was an aspiring rapper under the name Mr Sicc, and a member of an Ōtara gang called Bad Troublesome Ward. At a young age, Diamond was arrested twice for fighting, and carried weapons such as a knife and an axe, but said in a 2009 interview that Karlos worked to prevent him from getting involved with gangs.

Sid first became attracted to American hip hop after listening to Karlos' copy of the 1988 N.W.A single "Gangsta Gangsta." He recorded his first song at the age of eleven, and was part of a short-lived group called The Murder Squad.

== Career ==
Diamond formed hip-hop trio Smashproof in 2005 with members Tyree and Deach, and they signed a contract with Move The Crowd Records (a subsidiary of Universal) during his first semester of university; he dropped out shortly thereafter in order to pursue his music career full-time. His solo debut, The Truth, was released on Move The Crowd in 2007, and featured a guest appearance by Chamillionaire. He spent three weeks in New York recording the tracks, many of which were produced in Croatia, France, and Auckland. The album would then go on to debut at No. 27 in its lone week on the RIANZ top-40 album charts on 10 September, and won Urban Album of the Year honors at the 2008 Māori Music Awards. However, he came under controversy in February 2008 when he appeared in a music video for the track "Put Your Colourz On", which featured South Auckland street gang members.

His first album with Smashproof, titled The Weekend, was released in March 2009. The featured single, "Brother," broke a 23-year-old record for the longest consecutive run at number one by a New Zealand-based act on the country's singles chart. Sid was the opening act for Ice Cube's Straight Outta Compton Tour concert in Manukau City on 22 August 2007.

In 2010, Diamond released his second album, What Doesn't Kill Me..., which charted for eight weeks and won him his second Urban Album of the Year at the Māori Music Awards.

== Discography ==
=== Albums ===
Date	Title	Label	Chart peak
September 2007	The Truth	Move the Crowd/Universal	No. 27 (NZ)
May 2010	What Doesn't Kill Me...	Move the Crowd/Universal	No. 11 (NZ)
April 2026	Everything	Move the Crowd	No. 24 (NZ)

=== Singles ===
Title	Featured Performers	Album	Producers	Year
"Hood Like Me"		The Truth	Shuko	2007
"Hood Like Me (Remix)"	Fizek, Louie Knuxx, Ethical, Flowz, K54	The Truth	Shuko	2007
"Too Much Pain"	Brad Marquis	The Truth	Lyr1kz	2007
"Undisputed"		The Truth	Noble	2007
"MTC its OVA"	Ethical, Deach	The Truth	Cochise, Juse	2007
"My Letter"	Brad Marquis	The Truth	Lyr1kz	2007
"MADE"		What Doesn't Kill Me	Twice As Nice	2009
"Never Waste a Day"	Kayo	What Doesn't Kill Me	Twice As Nice	2010
"Stuck in a Box"	Stan Walker	What Doesn't Kill Me	Emile	2010
"You"	Deach	What Doesn't Kill Me	Twice As Nice	2010

=== Mixtape Appearances ===
Title	Featured Artists	DJ	Year
Speed of Sound Vol 1'	MTC	DJ Nino Brown	2005
Speed of Sound Vol 2'	MTC	DJ Manchoo	2006
Speed of Sound Vol 3'	MTC	DJ SMV	2007
Major Flavours Vol 2 (Australia)'	Urban Artists from NZ, Aus, USA	DJ Sirvere	2008
Speed of Sound Vol 4 (Domestic Disturbance)'	Young Sid	DJ Danny-ill	2009
Get Ready Mixtape'	Sir T Hosted By Young Sid	DJ SMV	2010
Speed of Sound Vol 5'	MTC	DJ Manchoo	2010

=== Other guest appearances ===
Title	Performers	Album	Producers	Year
"Oh No"	Tyree (feat. Deach)	Global Casino	Juse	2005
"Ride Till I Die"	Juse (feat. Smashproof and Kaeson)	Global Casino	Juse	2005
"Who Better Than This (Remix)"	PNC (feat. Scribe, David Dallas, Louie Knuxx, Koma, and Mareko)	P, N Whoa (Single)	41	2006
"Turn it Up"	DJ Sirvere (feat. Smashproof and MZRE)	Major Flavours	N/A	2006
"Put Ya Colours On"	Fizek (feat. Face Killa, Gravity, Punchline, and 187)	Skull Fingers Up (The Sample) (EP)	N/A	2008
"3rd Class Living"	Ethical (feat. M1)	Ages Turn	N/A	2008
"Problem Child"	Ethical (feat. Cyphanetic)	Ages Turn	N/A	2008
"Talk of the Town" (remix)	Ethical (feat. Tyson Tyler, Kardinal Offishall, and Grandmaster Roc Raida)	Coming of Age (EP)	Emile	2008
"Chop 'Em Down"	Ethical	Coming of Age (EP)	Twice As Nice	2008
"You Already Know"	Nesian Mystik	Elevator Musiq	DMON	2008
"Brother"	Smashproof with Gin Wigmore	The Weekend	F.B.I	2009
"It's Friday"	Smashproof	The Weekend	Styles Fuego	2009
"Ordinary Life"	Smashproof	The Weekend	Twice As Nice	2009
"Monstars Ink (Remix)"	Tyson Tyler (feat. Monsta Ganjah and Flowz)	Reality Cheque	Yorel	2009
"First Time"	David Dallas (feat. Jordache and Niko)	Something Awesome	P-Money & 41	2009
"Really Don't Care (Remix)"	Derty Sesh (feat. Ethical)	Sic Love	Derty Sesh	2009
"Deachy is Back (SP Remix)"	Deach (feat. Tyree)	Vision	Twice as Nice	2010
"Move The Crowd"	MTC	Speed of Sound Vol.5	Styalz Fuego	2010
"Ready For Whatever"	SIR T	Walk With Me	Twice As Nice	2010

== Awards and nominations ==
=== Nesian Vibes Awards ===
Year	Award	Category	Work	Result
2007	Nesian Vibe Awards	Best Artist		Nominated
2007	Nesian Vibe Awards	Best M.C.		Nominated
2007	Nesian Vibe Awards	Best Group	Smashproof	Nominated
2007	Nesian Vibe Awards	Best Album	The Truth	Nominated

=== Māori Music Awards ===
Year	Award	Category	Work	Result
2008	Māori Music Awards	Māori Urban Album of the Year	The Truth	Won
2008	Māori Music Awards	Māori Male Solo Artist of the Year		Nominated
2010	Māori Music Awards	Māori Urban Album of the Year	What Doesn't Kill Me	Won
2010	Māori Music Awards	Māori Male Solo Artist of the Year		Won

=== New Zealand Music Awards ===
Year	Award	Category	Work	Result
2008	New Zealand Music Awards	Hip-Hop Album of the Year	The Truth	Nominated
2009	New Zealand Music Awards	Most Singles Sold	Smashproof featuring Gin – Brother	Won
2009	New Zealand Music Awards	Best Music Video	Chris Graham – Brother	Won
2009	New Zealand Music Awards	People's Choice Award	Smashproof	Won
2009	New Zealand Music Awards	Urban/Hip-Hop Album of the Year	Smashproof – The Weekend	Nominated
2009	New Zealand Music Awards	Single of the Year	Smashproof featuring Gin – Brother	Nominated
2009	New Zealand Music Awards	Breakthrough Artist of the Year	Smashproof	Nominated
2010	New Zealand Music Awards	Urban/Hip-Hop Album of the Year	What Doesn't Kill Me	Nominated
