= Off to the Races (song) =

Promotional single by Lana Del Rey

from the album Born to Die
- Released: December 20, 2011
- Studio: Human Feel Studios (Los Angeles, CA)
- Genre: Alternative hip-hop; baroque pop; alt-pop
- Length: 5:01
- Label: Stranger; Interscope
- Songwriters: Lana Del Rey; Tim Larcombe
- Producers: Patrik Berger; Emile Haynie

Lana Del Rey promotional singles chronology
"Off to the Races" (2011)	"Carmen" (2012)

Licensed audio
- "Off to the Races" on YouTube

"Off to the Races" is a song by American singer and songwriter Lana Del Rey. First appearing on her self-titled Interscope debut, the song was re-released on her second studio album, Born to Die (2012). The song was written by Del Rey and Tim Larcombe. Emile Haynie and Patrik Berger paired up for the song's production. It was released in the UK as iTunes Single of the Week on December 20, 2011. In the Netherlands, "Off to the Races" was released as a digital single on January 6, 2012.

== Composition ==
"Off to the Races" describes Del Rey's relationship with an elder boyfriend, presumed to be a sugar daddy. The singer employs an "almost rapping" technique, hip-hop beat and heavy basslines, similar to that of "National Anthem" and "Diet Mountain Dew" in the song. Pitchfork Media said the rapping technique was almost "chatting." The song refers to Vladimir Nabokov's novel, Lolita, with lyrics such as, "Light of my life, fire of my loins". The song depicts Del Rey being bikini-clad eye candy while swimming in front of her lover while he sips on Cristal Champagne, while she remarks that he loves with "every beat of his cocaine heart" despite her crass Los Angeles mannerisms, and also references Riker’s Island. "Off to the Races" also features elements of cloud rap, such as "the distinct echoing of a hypeman in the background", and has Del Rey adopt a "baby-doll voice" during the song.

== Background and performances ==
"Off to the Races" was first available on Del Rey's now defunct SoundCloud profile on May 23, 2010. "Off to the Races" was released in the UK as iTunes Single of the Week on December 19, 2011. It was then released as a digital single in the Netherlands on January 6, 2012, on the iTunes Store. A video for "Off to the Races" was released through digital channels and was produced solely by Del Rey, similar to her previous hits. The video features Latin American gangsters, femme fatale figures with guns, and a race track. At the Ruby Lounge in Manchester, UK, Del Rey performed the song for the first time, along with "Video Games" and "Blue Jeans". It was the final song of the set. The song was also featured as the finale of The Endless Summer Tour and the LA to the Moon Tour.

== Critical reception ==
"Off to the Races" received mixed reviews, having been lyrically described as "a freak show of inappropriate co-dependency". Giving the song a negative review, indie music website Pitchfork said it "...aim[s] for chatty, sparkling opulence," adding that she "doesn't have the personality to bring it off." The Guardian wrote that "Off to the Races' turns Del Rey from vintage siren to R&B hoochie most convincingly. There's jazz in Del Rey's dextrous vocal, and new territory in the swoop and pow of Haynie's undertow." Comparing the song to "Video Games" and "Blue Jeans", The Huffington Post blogged that the song was "...pretty good...and it sounds just as catchy..." Of the song's music video, reviewer Robbie Daw commented: "...it seems the video's producer was off to find the cheesiest footage of old shoot-'em-up '80s B-movies for this clip."

== Track listing ==
Digital download

1. "Off to the Races" – 5:01

== Charts ==
Chart (2012)	Peak position
US Alternative Digital Songs (Billboard)	22
US Hot Rock Songs (Billboard)	40

== Certifications ==
Region	Certification	Certified units/sales
Australia (ARIA)	Gold	35,000^{‡}
Brazil (Pro-Música Brasil)	Gold	30,000^{‡}
New Zealand (RMNZ)	Gold	15,000^{‡}
United Kingdom (BPI)	Silver	200,000^{‡}
United States (RIAA)	Platinum	1,000,000^{‡}
^{‡} Sales+streaming figures based on certification alone.
