= National Anthem (Lana Del Rey song) =

2012 single by Lana Del Rey

Single by Lana Del Rey

from the album Born to Die
- Released: June 15, 2012
- Genre: Alternative hip hop
- Length: 3:51
- Label: Interscope; Polydor
- Songwriters: Lana Del Rey; Justin Parker; The Nexus; Penny Foster (DJ Fresh, Imani Williams, Theo Lucas)
- Producers: Emile Haynie; Jeff Bhasker; David Sneddon; James Bauer-Mein

Lana Del Rey singles chronology
"Blue Jeans" (2012)	"National Anthem" (2012)	"Summertime Sadness" (2012)

Music video
- "National Anthem" on YouTube

"National Anthem" is a song recorded by the American singer-songwriter Lana Del Rey for her second album, Born to Die (2012). It was released as the album's fourth single on June 15, 2012, through Interscope Records.

The music video for the song premiered on June 27, 2012. It is directed by Anthony Mandler. It depicts Del Rey as Marilyn Monroe and Jacqueline Kennedy and ASAP Rocky as John F. Kennedy. It portrays the assassination of John F. Kennedy. Positive reviews noted the song's critical evaluation of lavish lifestyles, noting its contribution to the lyrical and thematic structure of the album as a whole.

== Composition ==
In the chorus, Del Rey sings, "Tell me I'm your national anthem / Red, white, blue's in the sky / Summer's in the air, baby, heaven's in your eyes." At the close of the recording is a multi-layered narrative treatment. The introduction features the classic rendition "Happy Birthday Mr. President" as performed by Marilyn Monroe. Unlike the other songs on Born to Die, Del Rey employs an alternative rapping technique, hip hop beat and heavy basslines, similar to that of "Off to the Races" and "Diet Mountain Dew". Pitchfork Media said the rapping technique was almost "chatting".

== Reception and legacy ==
"National Anthem"
A 22-second sample of the song's chorus, features Del Rey incorporating a Jessica Rabbit persona over a "lush-strings-meet-hard-beats" background.

Initial critical reception to the song (like its parent album) was mixed, but retrospectively has been acclaimed as amongst the best of Del Rey's storied catalogue. Vocally, NME observed that Del Rey sings like a "perfect mannequin" on "National Anthem", criticizing the track for baldly revisiting the beat-driven chorus of "Born to Die". Further, NME praised certain elements of the track, saying: "As she sings of a relationship of a well-heeled man and a blank canvas woman, she invokes not only the dreamland of the monied classes (The Hamptons) and their could-be motto 'Money is the anthem of success' but also invokes the spectre of Vietnam with a reference to 'The Queen Of Saigon'." Digital Spy called the running theme of Born to Die, "demonic Stepford moll", which "National Anthem" fit into. The track was praised for having a: "laconic, anaesthetised vocal that conjures up images of her swigging from a bottle of Hendricks. There's a deep sadness underneath the sweeping string section and gangster hip-hop beats, but it's the chorus's fleeting glimpse of euphoria that'll keep you coming back."

On the Fourth of July, the song gains more attention due to its name being reminiscent of the American National Anthem. On July 4, 2017, the song received 58x times the daily average number of views.

== Music video ==
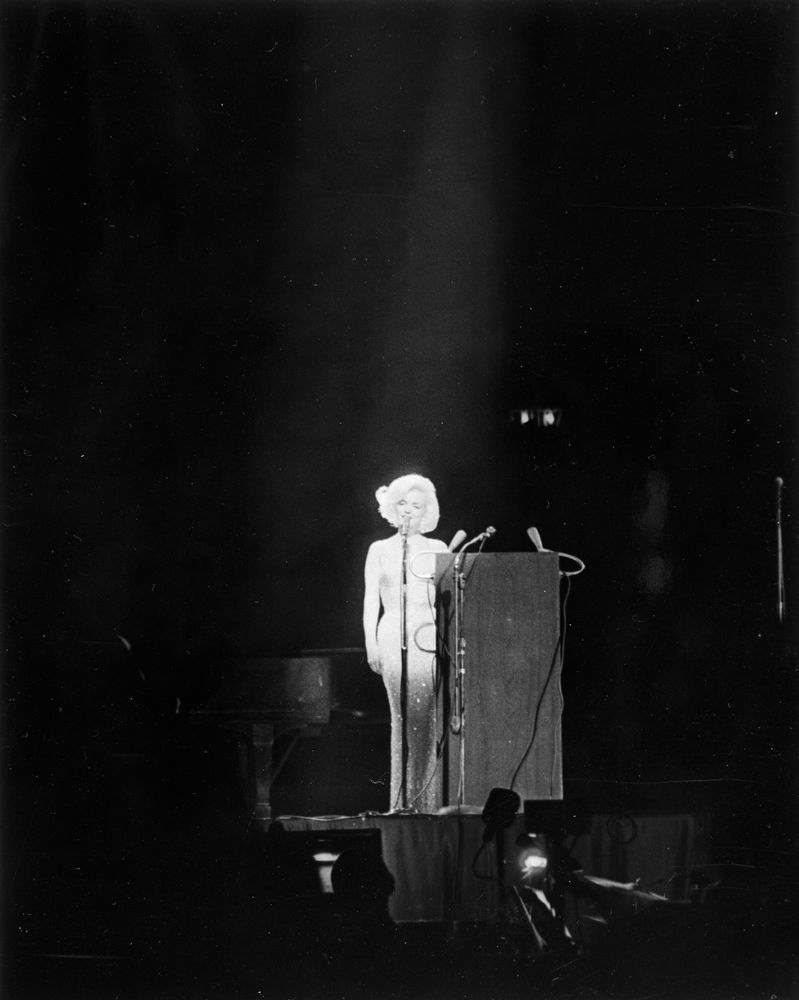
In the opening of the video, Del Rey reenacts Marilyn Monroe's infamous "Happy Birthday, Mr. President" performance for JFK.

=== Background and development ===
The music video for "National Anthem" was directed by Anthony Mandler in May 2012. It premiered on June 27, 2012. Mandler stated the concept was Del Rey's and that she was "really interested in exploring this loss of innocence, this idea that what you think you're experiencing is maybe not what it's always going to be. Because when you say 'Kennedy,' that immediately evokes something, just like when I say 'It's a Romeo and Juliet story.' So I think using that power, that pedigree of the story is a really fascinating place to show the loss of something, the breakdown of something."

Mandler described the video as being seen "through [Onassis'] eyes, seeing this kind of castle crumble in the moment, and that shot where she's coming up out of the car, and the pain in her eyes, that destruction, it's like the whole castle is crumbling around her." Del Rey cited the video as "definitely the most beautiful thing" she's ever done. Del Rey wrote the treatment for herself and ASAP Rocky saying "he'd be really perfect to star in it."

The video was premiered on June 27, 2012, through Noisey magazine's YouTube channel.

=== Synopsis ===
The video begins with Del Rey performing as Marilyn Monroe in a re-enactment of Monroe's infamous 1962 performance of "Happy Birthday, Mr. President". The rest of the video depicts Del Rey as Jacqueline Kennedy and rapper ASAP Rocky as John F. Kennedy in re-enactments of home videos during which they party on yachts, lay out by the pool, and run on the beach with their three small children. The video ends with a re-enactment of the infamous Zapruder film showing Kennedy's assassination and Del Rey reading from a love letter addressed to Kennedy, which is written from the perspective of Onassis reflecting on her and Kennedy's relationship, saying "And I remember when I met him, it was so clear that he was the only one for me." As well as his charm and personality, saying "When he walked in... every woman's head turned, everyone stood up to talk to him." This monologue may be derived from a little known-letter from Jacqueline Onassis to her husband, but in fact the letter seen in the video is an original piece written by Lana Del Rey.

=== Reception and impact ===
In January 2015, Billboard named the video as one of the 20 best music videos of the 2010s (so far). In December 2019, the magazine listed the video as the 11th greatest music video of the decade. Pedestrian magazine called the video "the best music of the decade". Harper's Bazaar ranked the video the sixth "most fashionable video of all time".

== Track listing ==
- Digital download
1. "National Anthem" – 3:50
2. "National Anthem" (Fred Falke Remix Edit) – 3:46
3. "National Anthem" (Tensnake Remix) – 3:43
4. "National Anthem" (Afterlife Remix) – 3:48
- Picture disc
1. "National Anthem" – 3:50
2. "National Anthem" (Breton Labs Remix) – 5:23

== Credits and personnel ==
- Lana Del Rey – vocals, songwriter
- The Nexus – songwriter, vocal producer
- Justin Parker – songwriter
- Penny Foster – songwriter
- Emile Haynie – producer, drums, keyboards
- Jeff Bhasker – additional production, additional keyboards, guitar
- James Bauer-Mein, David Sneddon, Emilie Bauer-Mein – backing vocals
- Larry Gold, Dan Heath – string arrangement, conductor
- Steve Tirpak – string assistance
- Manny Marroquin – audio mixing
- Erik Madrid, Chris Galland – audio mixing assistance

Credits adapted from Born to Die liner notes.

== Charts ==
Chart (2012)	Peak position
Belgium (Ultratip Bubbling Under Flanders)	40
France (SNEP)	152
UK Singles (Official Charts)	92
US Rock Songs (Billboard)	37

== Certifications ==
Region	Certification	Certified units/sales
Australia (ARIA)	Platinum	70,000^{‡}
Brazil (Pro-Música Brasil)	Platinum	60,000^{‡}
Denmark (IFPI Danmark)	Gold	45,000^{‡}
New Zealand (RMNZ)	Platinum	30,000^{‡}
United Kingdom (BPI)	Platinum	600,000^{‡}
United States (RIAA)	Platinum	1,000,000^{‡}
^{‡} Sales+streaming figures based on certification alone.

== Accolades ==
Year	Awards ceremony	Award	Results	Ref.
2012	UK Music Video Awards	Best Pop Video – International	Nominated	
2012	UK Music Video Awards	Best Styling in a Video	Nominated	

== Release history ==
Release dates and formats for "National Anthem"
Region	Date	Format	Label	Ref.
Italy	June 15, 2012	Radio airplay	Universal	
United Kingdom	July 6, 2012	Digital download	Polydor	
United Kingdom	July 9, 2012	Picture disc	Polydor	

== See also ==
- Assassination of John F. Kennedy in popular culture
