= List of Lana Del Rey live performances =

Lana Del Rey live performances
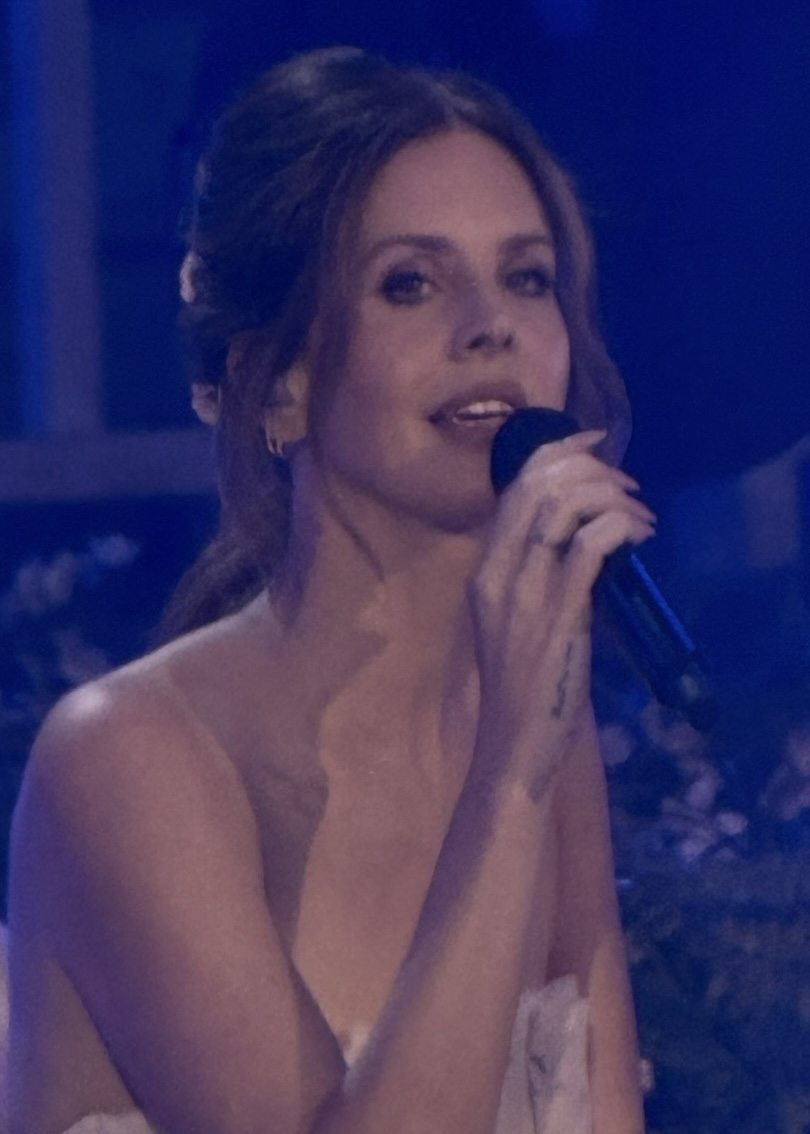
- Del Rey performing in Dublin June, 2025
- Concert tours: 6
- One-off concerts: 12
- Live performances: 28

Since her debut, American singer-songwriter Lana Del Rey has embarked on five headlining concert tours, performed at 78 festivals, and has made 13 appearances on television shows as a guest performer. Del Rey has headlined music festivals including Coachella in 2024, numerous BBC events, and seven Lollapalooza festivals internationally.

After the viral success of her single "Video Games" in 2011, Del Rey performed the song, and occasionally its follow-up single "Blue Jeans", on several television shows in France and England before debuting the songs on American television shows Late Night with David Letterman, Jimmy Kimmel Live!, and on Saturday Night Live. Following criticism for her performance on the latter, Del Rey cancelled several television performances and instead focused on her Born to Die Tour (2011–12). The tour's success saw the re-release of her debut studio album as Born to Die: The Paradise Edition, which was supported by its lead single, "Ride". In hopes of avoiding further scrutiny in the United States, Del Rey promoted the song solely with performances on English and French programs while she further promoted her work through her second headlining tour, the Paradise Tour (2013–14).

After her second major-label release, Ultraviolence (2014), Del Rey embarked on The Endless Summer Tour in 2015, which had Grimes and Courtney Love as its supporting acts. Following this, Del Rey released her third-major label record, Honeymoon, and embarked on a tour of 14 festivals in North America and Europe. Following the release of Lust for Life (2017), Del Rey embarked on a small promotional tour before announcing her fourth headlining concert tour, the LA to the Moon Tour (2018). The tour grossed over $22 million and had several supporting acts, including Kali Uchis, Jhene Aiko, and Børns.

On August 1, 2019, Del Rey announced The Norman Fucking Rockwell! Tour in support of her sixth studio album of the same name. The announcement came the same day as the release of the album trailer and the day after the tracklist and release date announcement.

After a few festival performances were revealed, Del Rey announced a 2023 tour in support of her album Did You Know That There's a Tunnel Under Ocean Blvd. These tour dates were Del Rey's first performances since the beginning of the COVID-19 pandemic.

In 2024, Del Rey announced a one-off concert on June 20, 2024 at Fenway Park in Boston. The concert ended up being delayed for more than two hours due to severe thunder storms and lightning. Since the venue had an 11 p.m. curfew, the set list ended up being shortened, leaving some fans disappointed.

== Concert tours ==
Title	Dates	Associated album(s)	Continent(s)	Shows	Gross
Born to Die Tour	November 4, 2011 – September 25, 2012	Born to Die	Oceania; Europe; North America	39	—N/a
Paradise Tour	April 3, 2013 – October 18, 2014	Paradise	Asia; Europe; North America; South America	94	—N/a
The Endless Summer Tour	May 7, 2015 – June 16, 2015	Ultraviolence	North America	20	US $685,478,538+
LA to the Moon Tour	January 5, 2018 – July 24, 2019	Lust for Life	North America; South America; Oceania; Europe	47	US $22,498,408+
The Norman Fucking Rockwell! Tour	September 21, 2019 – June 9, 2020	Norman Fucking Rockwell	North America; Asia	28	US $2 million
2023 tour	May 27, 2023 – October 5, 2023	Did You Know That There's a Tunnel Under Ocean Blvd	South America; Europe; North America	27	—N/a
2025 UK and Ireland Tour	June 23, 2025 – July 4, 2025		Europe	6	—N/a

== Music festivals ==
Date	Venue/Event	City	Country	Performed song(s)	Ref.
October 14, 2006	Loveseat Collective House Party	New York	United States	—N/a	
November 15, 2006	Jezebel Music Coverfest	New York	United States	—N/a	
June 21, 2007	Fête de la Musique	New York	United States	—N/a	
June 15, 2012	Sónar	Barcelona	Spain	—N/a	
June 17, 2012	Lovebox Festival	London	England	"Blue Jeans"; "Body Electric"; "Born to Die"; "Summertime Sadness"; "Without You"; "Million Dollar Man"; "Video Games"; "National Anthem"	
June 22, 2012	Isle of Wight Festival	Newport	Wales	"Blue Jeans"; "Born to Die"; "Summertime Sadness"; "Without You"; "Video Games"; "National Anthem"	
June 24, 2012	Radio 1's Hackney Weekend	London	England	"Blue Jeans"; "Body Electric"; "Born to Die"; "Million Dollar Man"; "Summertime Sadness"	
June 27, 2012	Hove Festival	Arendal	Norway	—N/a	
June 29, 2012	Rock Werchter	Werchter	Belgium	—N/a	
July 1, 2012	Eurockéennes	Belfort	France	—N/a	
July 4, 2012	Montreux Jazz Festival	Montreux	Switzerland	"Blue Jeans"; "Body Electric"; "Born to Die"; "Summertime Sadness"; "Without You"; "Million Dollar Man"; "Carmen"; "Video Games"; "National Anthem"	
July 5, 2012	House Festival	London	England	—N/a	
July 6, 2012	Super Bock Super Rock	Sesimbra	Portugal	—N/a	
July 13, 2012	Latitude Festival	Southwold	England	—N/a	
July 15, 2012	Melt! Festival	Gräfenhainichen	Germany	—N/a	
July 21, 2012	Spin Off Festival	Adelaide	Australia	—N/a	
July 28, 2012	Splendour in the Grass	Yelgun	Australia	—N/a	
September 25, 2012	iTunes Festival	London	England	"Blue Jeans"; "Body Electric"; "Born to Die"; "Summertime Sadness"; "Million Dollar Man"; "Video Games"; "Radio"; "Without You"; "National Anthem"	
April 13, 2013	Electronic Beats Festival	Prague	Czechia	—N/a	
July 5, 2013	Festival Jardins de Pedralbes	Barcelona	Spain	—N/a	
July 8, 2013	Rockwave Festival	Malakasa	Greece	"Cruel World"; "Cola"; "Blue Jeans"; "Born to Die"; "Honeymoon"; "High by the Beach"; "Freak"; "Carmen"; "Serial Killer"; "Lolita"; "Ultraviolence"; "Summertime Sadness"; "Yayo"; "Video Games"; "Off to the Races"	
July 10, 2013	Byblos International Festival	Byblos	Lebanon	—N/a	
August 2, 2013	Lollapalooza	Chicago	United States	—N/a	
November 9, 2013	Planeta Terra Festival	São Paulo	Brazil	—N/a	
November 12, 2013	Indie Fun Fest	Santiago	Chile	—N/a	
November 14, 2013	Planeta Terra Festival	Buenos Aires	Argentina	—N/a	
April 13, 2014	Coachella Valley Music and Arts Festival	Indio	United States	—N/a	
April 20, 2014	Coachella Valley Music and Arts Festival	Indio	United States	—N/a	
May 10, 2014	Sweetlife Festival	Columbia	United States	—N/a	
June 13, 2014	NorthSide Festival	Aarhus	Denmark	—N/a	
June 14, 2014	Bergenfest	Bergenhus	Norway	—N/a	
June 20, 2014	Citadel Music Festival	Berlin	Germany	—N/a	
June 21, 2014	Fête de la Musique	Paris	France	—N/a	
June 26, 2014	Bråvalla Festival	Norrköping	Sweden	—N/a	
June 4, 2014	Monte-Carlo Sporting Summer Festival	Monaco City	Monaco	—N/a	
June 5, 2014	Vida Festival	Vilanova i la Geltrú	Spain	—N/a	
June 15, 2014	Live at the Marquee	Cork	Ireland	—N/a	
June 17, 2014	Carcassonne Festival	Carcassonne	France	—N/a	
June 28, 2014	Glastonbury Festival	Pilton	England	—N/a	
August 24, 2014	Rock en Seine	Saint-Cloud	France	—N/a	
September 20, 2014	Music Midtown Festival	Atlanta	United States	—N/a	
October 4, 2014	Austin City Limits Music Festival	Austin	United States	—N/a	
October 11, 2014	Austin City Limits Music Festival	Austin	United States	—N/a	
May 24, 2015	Sasquatch! Music Festival	George	United States	—N/a	
June 7, 2015	Governors Ball Music Festival	New York	United States	—N/a	
June 3, 2016	Orange Warsaw Festival	Warsaw	Poland	—N/a	
July 9, 2016	TW Classic Festival	Werchter	Belgium	—N/a	
July 10, 2016	Park Live Festival	Moscow	Russia	—N/a	
July 13, 2016	Montreux Jazz Festival	Montreux	Switzerland	"Cruel World"; "Cola"; "Blue Jeans"; "Born to Die"; "Honeymoon"; "Salvatore"; "High by the Beach"; "Freak"; "Carmen"; "Serial Killer"; "Lolita"; "Ultraviolence"; "Summertime Sadness"; "Yayo"; "Video Games"; "Ride"; "Off to the Races"	
July 13, 2016	Moon and Stars	Locarno	Switzerland	—N/a	
July 13, 2016	Les Vieilles Charrues	Carhaix-Plouguer	France	—N/a	
July 19, 2016	Rockwave Festival	Malakasa	Greece	—N/a	
July 23, 2016	Monte-Carlo Sporting Summer Festival	Monaco City	Monaco	—N/a	
July 28, 2016	Lollapalooza	Chicago	United States	—N/a	
July 30, 2016	Osheaga Festival	Montreal	Canada	—N/a	
August 7, 2016	Outside Lands Music and Arts Festival	San Francisco	United States	—N/a	
August 28, 2016	Ohana Festival	Dana Point	United States	—N/a	
September 4, 2016	Electric Picnic	Stradbally	Ireland	—N/a	
November 20, 2016	Corona Capital	Mexico City	Mexico	—N/a	
March 17, 2017	South by Southwest	Austin	United States	—N/a	
May 20, 2017	KROQ Weenie Roast	Carson	United States	—N/a	
May 27, 2017	BBC Radio 1's Big Weekend	Hull	England	—N/a	
June 23, 2017	Lollapalooza Paris	Paris	France	—N/a	
August 9, 2017	Øyafestivalen	Oslo	Norway	—N/a	
August 11, 2017	Flow Festival	Helsinki	Finland	"Body Electric"; "Cherry"; "Shades of Cool"; "Blue Jeans"; "Born to Die"; "White Mustang"; "Summertime Sadness"; "Music to Watch Boys To"; "Ultraviolence"; "Change"; "Ride"; "Love"; "Video Games"; "Off to the Races"	
August 12, 2017	Way Out West Fest	Gothenburg	Sweden	"Body Electric"; "Cherry"; "Shades of Cool"; "Blue Jeans"; "Born to Die"; "White Mustang"; "Music to Watch Boys To"; "Ultraviolence"; "Change"; "Ride"; "Love"; "Video Games"; "Summertime Sadness"; "Off to the Races"	
August 19, 2017	Live Musical Festival	Kraków	Poland	—N/a	
October 28, 2017	Camp Flog Gnaw Carnival	Los Angeles	United States	"13 Beaches"; "Diet Mountain Dew"; "Cherry"; "Blue Jeans"; "Born to Die"; "West Coast"; "White Mustang"; "Lust for Life"; "Ride"; "Love"; "Video Games"; "Off to the Races"	
March 17, 2018	Lollapalooza Argentina	Buenos Aires	Argentina	"13 Beaches"; "Cherry"; "Pretty When You Cry"; "White Mustang"; "High by the Beach"; "Born to Die"; "Blue Jeans"; "National Anthem"; "West Coast"; "Lust for Life"; "Change" / "Black Beauty" / "Young and Beautiful" / "Ride"; "Video Games"; "Summertime Sadness"; "Off to the Races"	
March 19, 2018	Lollapalooza Chile	Santiago	Chile	"13 Beaches"; "Cherry"; "Pretty When You Cry"; "White Mustang"; "High by the Beach"; "Born to Die"; "Blue Jeans"; "National Anthem"; "West Coast"; "Lust for Life"; "Change" / "Black Beauty" / "Young and Beautiful" / "Ride"; "Video Games"; "Summertime Sadness"; "Off to the Races"	
March 23, 2018	Estéreo Picnic Festival	Bogotá	Colombia	"13 Beaches"; "Cherry"; "Pretty When You Cry"; "White Mustang"; "High by the Beach"; "Born to Die"; "Blue Jeans"; "National Anthem"; "West Coast"; "Lust for Life"; "Change" / "Black Beauty" / "Young and Beautiful" / "Ride"; "Video Games"; "Summertime Sadness"; "Off to the Races"	
March 25, 2018	Lollapalooza Brazil	São Paulo	Brazil	"13 Beaches"; "Cherry"; "Pretty When You Cry"; "White Mustang"; "High by the Beach"; "Born to Die"; "Blue Jeans"; "National Anthem"; "West Coast"; "Lust for Life"; "Change" / "Black Beauty" / "Young and Beautiful" / "Ride"; "Video Games"; "Ultraviolence"; "Serial Killer"; Yayo"; "Get Free"; "Summertime Sadness"	
June 29, 2018	Aerodrome Festival	Panenský Týnec	Czechia	"13 Beaches"; "Cherry"; "Pretty When You Cry"; "White Mustang"; "Born to Die"; "Blue Jeans"; "Lust for Life"; "Change" / "Black Beauty" / "Young and Beautiful"; "Ride"; "Video Games"; "Summertime Sadness"; "National Anthem"; "Off to the Races"	
August 10, 2018	Sziget Festival	Budapest	Hungary	"13 Beaches"; "Cherry"; "Pretty When You Cry"; "White Mustang"; "Born to Die"; "Burnt Norton"; "Blue Jeans"; "Lust for Life"; "Change" / "Black Beauty" / "Young and Beautiful"; "Ride"; "The Blackest Day"; "Yayo"; "Video Games"; "Summertime Sadness"; "National Anthem"; "Gods & Monsters"; "Get Free"; "Off to the Races"	
March 22, 2019	BUKU Music + Art Project	New Orleans	United States	"Blue Jeans"; "Cherry"; "White Mustang"; "Pretty When You Cry"; "Born to Die"; "Mariners Apartment Complex"; "Video Games"; "High By The Beach"; "National Anthem"; "Summertime Sadness"; "Off to the Races"; "Venice Bitch"	
June 22, 2019	Malahide Castle	Dublin	Ireland	"West Coast" (intro); "Born to Die"; "Cherry"; "White Mustang"; "Pretty When You Cry"; "Blue Jeans"; "Burnt Norton" (interlude); "Mariners Apartment Complex"; "Change" / "Black Beauty" / "Young and Beautiful"; "Ride"; "Video Games"; "Doin' Time"; "National Anthem"; "Summertime Sadness"; "Off to the Races"; "Old Money"; "Venice Bitch"	
June 27, 2019	Tinderbox Festival	Odense	Denmark	"West Coast" (intro); "Born to Die"; "Cherry"; "White Mustang"; "Pretty When You Cry"; "Blue Jeans"; "Burnt Norton" (interlude); "Mariners Apartment Complex"; "Change" / "Black Beauty" / "Young and Beautiful"; "Ride"; "Video Games"; "Doin' Time"; "National Anthem"; "Summertime Sadness"; "Off to the Races"; "Venice Bitch"	
June 27, 2019	Lollapalooza Stockholm	Stockholm	Sweden	"West Coast" (intro); "Born to Die"; "Cherry"; "White Mustang"; "Pretty When You Cry"; "Blue Jeans"; "Burnt Norton" (interlude); "Mariners Apartment Complex"; "Change" / "Black Beauty" / "Young and Beautiful"; "Ride"; "Video Games"; "Doin' Time"; "National Anthem"; "Summertime Sadness"; "Off to the Races"; "Venice Bitch"	
July 6, 2019	Open'er Festival	Gdynia	Poland	"West Coast" (intro); "Born to Die"; "Cherry"; "White Mustang"; "Pretty When You Cry"; "Blue Jeans"; "Burnt Norton" (interlude); "Mariners Apartment Complex"; "Change" / "Black Beauty" / "Young and Beautiful"; "Ride"; "Video Games"; "Doin' Time"; "National Anthem"; "Summertime Sadness"; "Off to the Races"; "Venice Bitch"	
July 18, 2019	Super Bock Super Rock	Sesimbra	Portugal	"West Coast" (intro); "Born to Die"; "Cherry"; "White Mustang"; "Pretty When You Cry"; "Blue Jeans"; "Burnt Norton" (interlude); "Mariners Apartment Complex"; "Change" / "Black Beauty" / "Young and Beautiful"; "Ride"; "Video Games"; "Doin' Time"; "National Anthem"; "Summertime Sadness"; "Off to the Races"; "Venice Bitch"	
July 19, 2019	Festival Internacional de Benicàssim	Benicàssim	Spain	"West Coast" (intro); "Born to Die"; "Cherry"; "White Mustang"; "Pretty When You Cry"; "Blue Jeans"; "Burnt Norton" (interlude); "Mariners Apartment Complex"; "Change" / "Black Beauty" / "Young and Beautiful"; "Ride"; "Video Games"; "Doin' Time"; "National Anthem"; "Summertime Sadness"; "Off to the Races"; "Venice Bitch"	
July 21, 2019	Latitude Festival	Southwold	England	"West Coast" (intro); "Born to Die"; "Cherry"; "White Mustang"; "Pretty When You Cry"; "Blue Jeans"; "Burnt Norton" (interlude); "Mariners Apartment Complex"; "Change" / "Black Beauty" / "Young and Beautiful"; "Ride"; "Video Games"; "Doin' Time"; "National Anthem"; "Summertime Sadness"; "Off to the Races"; "Venice Bitch"	
July 24, 2019	Paleo Festival	Nyon	Switzerland	"West Coast" (intro); "Born to Die"; "Cherry"; "White Mustang"; "Pretty When You Cry"; "Blue Jeans"; "Burnt Norton" (interlude); "Mariners Apartment Complex"; "Change" / "Black Beauty" / "Young and Beautiful"; "Ride"; "Video Games"; "Doin' Time"; "National Anthem"; "Summertime Sadness"; "Off to the Races"; "Venice Bitch"	
May 27, 2023	MITA Festival	Rio de Janeiro	Brazil	"Nature Boy" (intro); "A&W"; "Young and Beautiful"; "Bartender"; "The Grants"; "Flipside"; "Cherry"; "Pretty When You Cry"; "Ride"; "Born to Die"; "Blue Jeans"; "Norman fucking Rockwell"; "Arcadia"; "Ultraviolence"; "White Mustang"; "Candy Necklace"; "Venice Bitch"; "Diet Mountain Dew"; "Summertime Sadness"; "Did You Know That There's a Tunnel Under Ocean Blvd"; "Video Games"	
June 3, 2023	MITA Festival	São Paulo	Brazil	"Nature Boy" (intro); "A&W"; "Young and Beautiful"; "Bartender"; "The Grants"; "Flipside"; "Cherry"; "Pretty When You Cry"; "Ride"; "Born to Die"; "Blue Jeans"; "Norman fucking Rockwell"; "Arcadia"; "Ultraviolence"; "White Mustang"; "Candy Necklace"; "Venice Bitch"; "Diet Mountain Dew"; "Summertime Sadness"; "Get Free"; "Did You Know That There's a Tunnel Under Ocean Blvd"; "Cinnamon Girl"; "Video Games"	
June 24, 2023	Glastonbury Festival	Pilton	England	"Nature Boy" (intro); "A&W"; "Young and Beautiful"; "Bartender"; "The Grants"; "Cherry"; "Pretty When You Cry"; "Ride"; "Born to Die"; "Blue Jeans"; "Norman fucking Rockwell"; "Arcadia"; "Candy Necklace"; "Ultraviolence"; "White Mustang"; "Video Games"	
July 2, 2023	La Prima Estate Festival	Camaiore	Italy	"Nature Boy" (intro); "A&W"; "Young and Beautiful"; "Bartender"; "Chemtrails over the Country Club"; "The Grants"; "Cherry"; "Pretty When You Cry"; "Ride"; "Born to Die"; "Blue Jeans"; "Norman fucking Rockwell"; "Arcadia"; "Ultraviolence"; "White Mustang"; "Candy Necklace"; "Salvatore"; "Venice Bitch"; "Diet Mountain Dew"; "Summertime Sadness"; "Did You Know That There's a Tunnel Under Ocean Blvd"; "Video Games"	
July 4, 2023	Ziggo Dome	Amsterdam	Netherlands	"Nature Boy" (intro); "A&W"; "Young and Beautiful"; "Bartender"; "Chemtrails over the Country Club"; "The Grants"; "Cherry"; "Pretty When You Cry"; "Ride"; "Born to Die"; "Blue Jeans"; "Norman fucking Rockwell"; "Arcadia"; "Ultraviolence"; "White Mustang"; "Candy Necklace"; "Salvatore"; "Venice Bitch"; "Diet Mountain Dew"; "Summertime Sadness"; "Did You Know That There's a Tunnel Under Ocean Blvd"; "Video Games"; "Nature Boy" (outro)	
July 7, 2023	3Arena	Dublin	Ireland	"Nature Boy" (intro); "A&W"; "Young and Beautiful"; "Bartender"; "Chemtrails over the Country Club"; "The Grants"; "Cherry"; "Pretty When You Cry"; "Ride"; "Born to Die"; "Blue Jeans"; "Norman fucking Rockwell"; "Arcadia"; "Ultraviolence"; "White Mustang"; "Candy Necklace"; "Salvatore"; "Diet Mountain Dew"; "Summertime Sadness"; "Did You Know That There's a Tunnel Under Ocean Blvd"; "Video Games"; "Nature Boy" (outro)	
July 9, 2023	BST Hyde Park	London	England	"Nature Boy" (intro); "A&W"; "Young and Beautiful"; "Bartender"; "Chemtrails over the Country Club"; "The Grants"; "Cherry"; "Pretty When You Cry"; "Ride"; "Born to Die"; "Blue Jeans"; "Norman fucking Rockwell"; "Arcadia"; "Ultraviolence"; "White Mustang"; "Candy Necklace"; "Salvatore"; "Diet Mountain Dew"; "Summertime Sadness"; "Did You Know That There's a Tunnel Under Ocean Blvd"; "Video Games"; "Nature Boy" (outro)	
July 10, 2023	Olympia	Paris	France	"Nature Boy" (intro); "A&W"; "Young and Beautiful"; "Bartender"; "Chemtrails over the Country Club"; "The Grants"; "Cherry"; "Pretty When You Cry"; "Ride"; "Born to Die"; "Blue Jeans"; "Norman fucking Rockwell"; "Arcadia"; "Ultraviolence"; "White Mustang"; "Candy Necklace"; "Salvatore"; "Diet Mountain Dew"; "Summertime Sadness"; "Did You Know That There's a Tunnel Under Ocean Blvd"; "Video Games"; "Nature Boy" (outro)	
July 15, 2023	Festival d'été de Québec	Quebec	Canada	To be announced	
July 30, 2023	Newport Folk Festival	Newport	United States	To be announced	
August 6, 2023	Lollapalooza	Chicago	United States	To be announced	
August 11, 2023	Outside Lands Music and Arts Festival	San Francisco	United States	To be announced	
October 1, 2023	All Things Go Fall Classic	Columbia	United States	To be announced	
October 11, 2026	2026 Singapore Grand Prix	Singapore		"Young and Beautiful"; "Video Games"; "West Coast"; "White Feather Hawk Tail Deer Hunter"; "Henry, Come On"; "Chemtrails Over The Country Club"; "Ultraviolence"; "Ride"; "Norman Fucking Rockwell"; "Did You Know That There's a Tunnel Under Ocean Blvd"; "Blue Jeans"; "Born To Die"; "Summertime Sadness"	

== One-off concerts ==
Date	Venue	City	Country	Performed song(s)	Ref.
July 24, 2017	Brixton Academy	London	England	"Cruel World"; "Cherry"; "Shades of Cool"; "Blue Jeans"; "Born to Die"; "Summertime Sadness"; "Video Games"; "Serial Killer"; "White Mustang"; "In My Feelings"; "Ultraviolence"; "Ride"; "Love"; "Off to the Races"	
July 31, 2017	House of Blues	Chicago	United States	"Body Electric"; "Cherry"; "Shades of Cool"; "Blue Jeans"; "Born to Die"; "White Mustang"; "Cruel World"; "Music to Watch Boys To"; "Ultraviolence"; "Change"; "Ride"; "Love"; "Video Games"; "Summertime Sadness"; "Get Free"; "Off to the Races"	
August 1, 2017	House of Blues	Anaheim	United States	"Body Electric"; "Cherry"; "Shades of Cool"; "Blue Jeans"; "Born to Die"; "White Mustang"; "Cruel World"; "Music to Watch Boys To"; "Ultraviolence"; "Change"; "Salvatore"; "Ride"; "Love"; "Million Dollar Man"; "Video Games"; "Summertime Sadness"; "Off to the Races"	
August 22, 2017	Echo Arena	Liverpool	England	"Body Electric"; "Cherry"; "Shades of Cool"; "Blue Jeans"; "Born to Die"; "White Mustang"; "Burnt Norton"; "Music to Watch Boys To"; "Ultraviolence"; "Change"; "Ride"; "Love"; "Video Games"; "Summertime Sadness"; "Off to the Races"	
August 23, 2017	SSE Hydro	Glasgow	Scotland	"Body Electric"; "Cherry"; "Shades of Cool"; "Blue Jeans"; "Born to Die"; "White Mustang"; "Burnt Norton"; "Music to Watch Boys To"; "Ultraviolence"; "Change"; "Ride"; "Love"; "Video Games"; "Summertime Sadness"; "Off to the Races"	
September 5, 2017	Bill Graham Civic Auditorium	San Francisco	United States	"Cruel World"; "Cherry"; "Shades of Cool"; "Blue Jeans"; "Born to Die"; "White Mustang"; "Music to Watch Boys To"; "Ultraviolence"; "Change"; "Ride"; "Love"; "Body Electric"; "Video Games"; "Summertime Sadness"; "Off to the Races"	
September 8, 2017	Santa Barbara Bowl	Santa Barbara	United States	"Cruel World"; "Cherry"; "Shades of Cool"; "Blue Jeans"; "Born to Die"; "White Mustang"; "Music to Watch Boys To"; "Ultraviolence"; "Change"; "Ride"; "Love"; "Body Electric"; "Video Games"; "Summertime Sadness"; "Off to the Races"	
October 23, 2017	Terminal 5	New York City	United States	"13 Beach"; "Diet Mountain Dew"; "Cherry"; "Shades of Cool"; "Blue Jeans"; "Born to Die"; "White Mustang"; "Lust for Life"; "Music to Watch Boys To"; "Ultraviolence"; "Change"; "Ride"; "Love"; "Video Games"; "Summertime Sadness"; "Get Free"; "Off to the Races"	
October 24, 2017	Terminal 5	New York City	United States	"13 Beach"; "Diet Mountain Dew"; "Cherry"; "Shades of Cool"; "Chelsea Hotel No. 2"; "Pretty When You Cry"; "Blue Jeans"; "Born to Die"; "White Mustang"; "Lust for Life"; "Music to Watch Boys To"; "Ultraviolence"; "Change"; "Ride"; "Love"; "Video Games"; "Summertime Sadness"; "Off to the Races"	
October 13, 2019	Grammy Museum at L.A. Live	Los Angeles	United States	"Norman Fucking Rockwell"; "Bartender"; "Mariners Apartment Complex"; "For Free" (Joni Mitchell cover) (with Weyes Blood and Zella Day); "How to Disappear" (with Jack Antonoff); "Venice Bitch" (with Jack Antonoff)	
December 21, 2020	Ally Coalition Talent Show	New York City	United States	"Silent Night"; "Let Me Love You Like a Woman"	
September 3, 2023	Robert's Western World	Nashville	United States	"Stand by Your Man" (Tammy Wynette cover)	

== Broadcast performances ==
Year	Title	Country	Performed song(s)	Notes
2011	Later... with Jools Holland	England	"Video Games"	
2011	La musicale speciale	France	"Video Games"; "Blue Jeans"	
2011	Le Grand Journal	France	"Video Games"; "Blue Jeans"	
2011	De wereld draait door	Netherlands	"Video Games"	
2011	Inas nacht	Germany	"Video Games"	
2011	Taratata	France	"Video Games"	
2012	The Jonathan Ross Show	England	"Video Games"	Episode: "2.1"
2012	Saturday Night Live	United States	"Video Games"; "Blue Jeans"	Episode: "Daniel Radcliffe/Lana Del Rey"
2012	Absolute Radio	England		
2012	Zane Lowe Sessions	England	"Video Games"	
2012	Le grand journal	France	"Video Games"; "Million Dollar Man"	
2012	Late Night with David Letterman	United States	"Video Games"	Episode: "19.83"
2012	Jimmy Kimmel Live!	United States	"Video Games"	Episode: "10.120"
2012	LIVE 105	United States	"Video Games"	
2012	American Idol	United States	"Video Games"	Episode: "Top 10 Results"
2012	Buenas noches y Buenafuente	Spain	"Video Games"	Episode: "1.2"
2012	The Voice UK	England	"Blue Jeans"	Episode: "Live Show 1 Results"
2012	BBC Radio 1 Hackney Weekend 2012	England	"Video Games"; "Blue Jeans"; "Born to Die"; "Off to the Races"; "Summertime Sadness"; "National Anthem"; "Million Dollar Man"; "Body Electric"	Television special
2012	Radio One Live Lounge	England	"Video Games"; "Born to Die"	
2012	Langs de Leeuw	Netherlands	"Ride"	
2012	C à vous	France	"Ride"	
2012	Later... with Jools Holland	England	"Ride"	
2012	Radio One Live Lounge	England	"Goodbye Kiss"	
2015	Radio One Live Lounge	England	"High by the Beach"; "Honeymoon"; "Terrence Loves You"	
2019	Radio One Live Lounge	England	"Doin' Time"; "Break Up with Your Girlfriend, I'm Bored"	
2020	Late Night with Jimmy Fallon	United States	"Let Me Love You Like a Woman"	Pre-recorded due to the COVID-19 pandemic.
2021	The Late Show with Stephen Colbert	United States	"Arcadia"	Pre-recorded due to the COVID-19 pandemic.
2023	Christmas at Graceland	United States	"Unchained Melody"	Television special
