= Paradise Tour =

2013–14 concert tour by Lana Del Rey

- World tour by Lana Del Rey
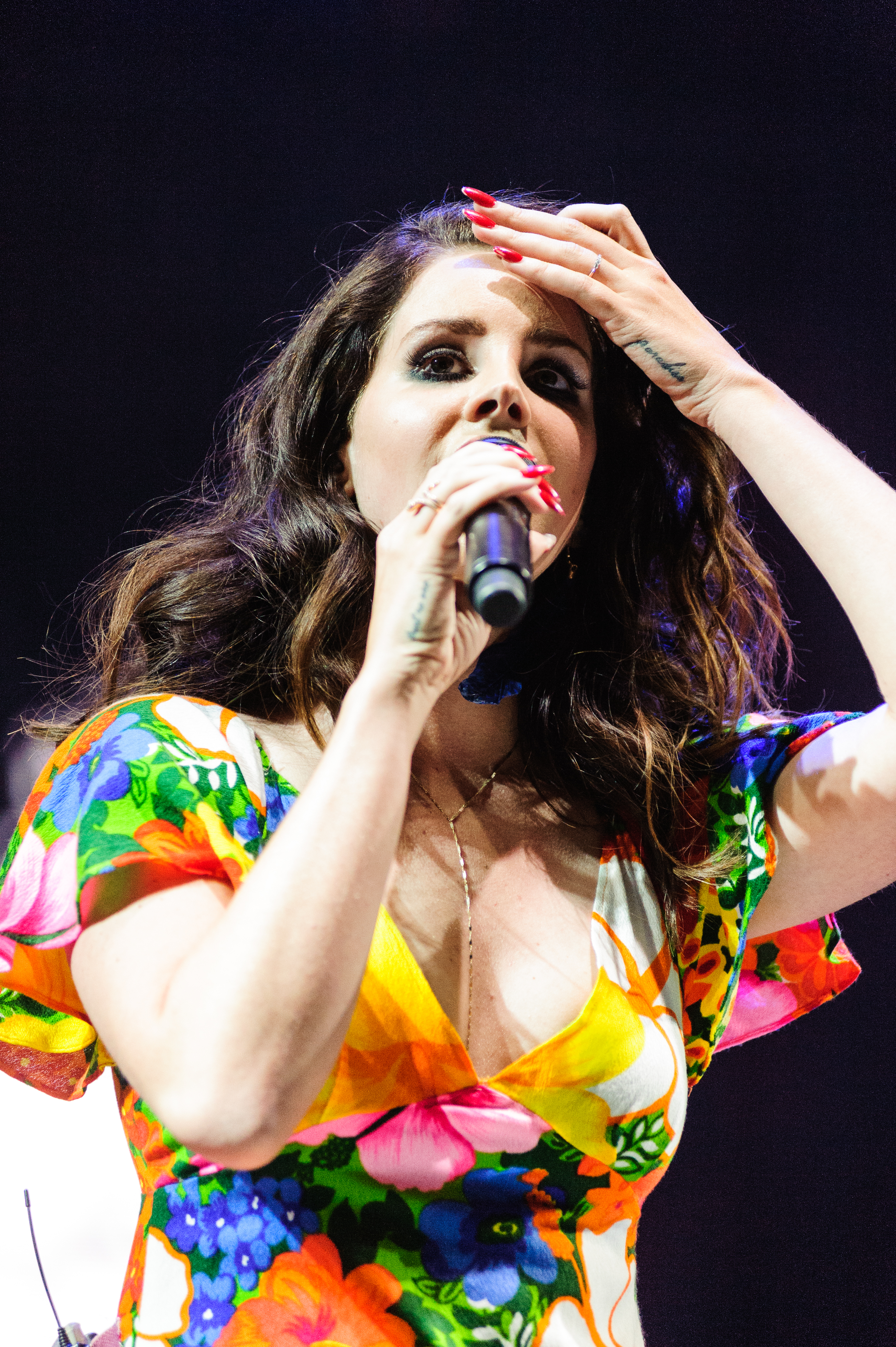
- Del Rey performing for the tour during Coachella
- Location: North America; Europe; Asia; South America
- Associated album: Paradise
- Start date: April 3, 2013
- End date: October 18, 2014
- Legs: 7
- No. of shows: 54 in Europe; 1 in Asia; 34 in North America; 5 in South America; 94 in total

Lana Del Rey concert chronology
- Born to Die Tour (2011–12); Paradise Tour (2013–14); The Endless Summer Tour (2015)

The Paradise Tour was the second concert tour by American singer, Lana Del Rey, in support of her third extended play, Paradise. The tour kicked off on April 3, 2013, at Galaxie Mega Hall in Amnéville, France and visited many major European countries during the spring and summer in 2013. The tour concluded on October 18, 2014, at the Hollywood Forever Cemetery in Los Angeles. Overall, the tour lasted over eighteen months from April 2013 to October 2014 and visited four continents.

== Background ==
On November 12, 2012, Del Rey released her third extended play, Paradise worldwide. The extended play was released as a stand-alone EP, but was also re-released with her second studio album, Born to Die, which was named Born to Die: The Paradise Edition. The EP debuted at number 10 on the United States Billboard 200 with a first week sales of 67,000 copies and also charted fairly in other European countries. The album also gained positive reviews from many critics including the Rolling Stone calling the EP "conceptually sharp" and the Los Angeles Times stating that the album is "strong". Dates for a tour in support of the EP were announced on October 31, 2012, beginning with an extensive European leg of shows, and tickets became available on November 5, 2012. Gradually, Del Rey began to add more dates including festival and headlining shows in many European countries such as Germany, Sweden, and Norway. During 2013, Del Rey announced dates for United States, Turkey, Brazil, Chile, and Argentina. Most of the European shows from April to May 2013 were supported by Kassidy, a Scottish band fronted by Del Rey's then boyfriend, Barrie-James O'Neill.

The tour was later extended into 2014, during the 2014 shows Del Rey performed songs from Ultraviolence. During February and March 2014, a leg of North American shows were announced surrounding Del Rey's appearances at the Coachella Valley Music and Arts Festival. Throughout the following months, more dates were announced including European and American festival shows, and headlining shows in Mexico. The entire tour concluded with two one-off shows at the Hollywood Forever Cemetery in Los Angeles during October 2014.

== Set list ==
This set list is representative of the show on May 3, 2013, in Turin, Italy. It does not represent all dates throughout the tour.

1. "Cola"
2. "Body Electric"
3. "Blue Jeans"
4. "Born to Die"
5. "Carmen"
6. "Million Dollar Man"
7. "Blue Velvet"
8. "American"
9. "Without You"
10. "Knockin' on Heaven's Door" (Bob Dylan cover)
11. "Young and Beautiful"
12. "Ride"
13. "Summertime Sadness"
14. "Burning Desire"
15. "Video Games"
16. "National Anthem"
Notes
- Del Rey performed a cover of Cole Porter's "I Love Paris" on April 27 and 28, 2013 in Paris, France.
- "Young and Beautiful" was added to the setlist on April 30, 2013 in Esch-sur-Alzette, Luxembourg.
- "Dark Paradise" was performed on May 6, 2013 in Rome, Italy.
- "Burning Desire" was only performed during international shows.

== Shows ==
List of concerts showing date, city, country, venue and opening act
| Date | City | Country | Venue | Opening acts |
Europe
| April 3, 2013 | Amnéville | France | Galaxie Mega Hall | —N/a |
| April 5, 2013 | Copenhagen | Denmark | Tap1 | Kassidy |
| April 6, 2013 | Hamburg | Germany | Barclays Arena | Kassidy |
| April 8, 2013 | Stockholm | Sweden | Annexet | Kassidy |
| April 10, 2013 (Note: The show on April 10, 2013 in Oslo, Norway was originally planned to take place at Sentrum Scene, but the venue was upgraded due to popular demand.) | Oslo | Norway | Oslo Spektrum | Kassidy |
| April 12, 2013 | Copenhagen | Denmark | Falconer Salen | Kassidy |
| April 13, 2013 (Note: The show on April 13, 2013 in Prague, Czech Republic was part of the Electronic Beats Festival.) | Prague | Czechia | Archa Theatre | —N/a |
| April 15, 2013 | Berlin | Germany | Velodrom | Kassidy |
| April 17, 2013 | Düsseldorf | Germany | Mitsubishi Electric Halle | Kassidy |
| April 19, 2013 | Vienna | Austria | Bank Austria Halle | Kassidy |
| April 20, 2013 | Frankfurt | Germany | Jahrhunderthalle | Kassidy |
| April 25, 2013 | Munich | Germany | Zenith | Kassidy |
| April 27, 2013 | Paris | France | Olympia | Kassidy |
| April 28, 2013 | Paris | France | Olympia | Kassidy |
| April 30, 2013 | Esch-sur-Alzette | Luxembourg | Rockhal | Kassidy |
| May 1, 2013 | Geneva | Switzerland | SEG Geneva Arena | Kassidy |
| May 3, 2013 | Turin | Italy | Pala Alpitour | Kassidy |
| May 4, 2013 | Monaco | | Salle Garnier | Kassidy |
| May 6, 2013 | Rome | Italy | PalaLottomatica | Kassidy |
| May 7, 2013 (Note: The show on May 7, 2013 in Assago, Italy was originally planned to take place at Alcatraz, but the venue was upgraded due to popular demand.) | Assago (Note: Promoted as Milan) | Italy | Mediolanum Forum | Kassidy |
| May 9, 2013 | Madrid | Spain | Sala Riviera | Kassidy |
| May 12, 2013 | Birmingham | England | O_{2} Academy | Kassidy |
| May 13, 2013 | Birmingham | England | O_{2} Academy | Kassidy |
| May 16, 2013 (Note: The May 16, 2013 show in Glasgow was originally scheduled to be held over two nights (May 15 and 16) at the O_{2} Academy, but the venue was upgraded due to popular demand.) | Glasgow | Scotland | SEC Centre | Kassidy |
| May 19, 2013 | London | England | Eventim Apollo | Kassidy |
| May 20, 2013 | London | England | Eventim Apollo | Kassidy |
| May 23, 2013 | Manchester | England | O_{2} Apollo | Sam Bradley |
| May 24, 2013 | Manchester | England | O_{2} Apollo | Billy Locket |
| May 26, 2013 | Dublin | Ireland | Vicar Street | Kassidy |
| May 27, 2013 | Dublin | Ireland | Vicar Street | Kassidy |
| May 29, 2013 | Amsterdam | Netherlands | Heineken Music Hall | Kassidy |
| May 31, 2013 | Brussels | Belgium | Forest National | Kassidy |
| June 2, 2013 | Warsaw | Poland | Torwar Hall | Dawid Podsiadło |
| June 4, 2013 | Vilnius | Lithuania | Siemens Arena | Golden Parazyth |
| June 10, 2013 | Kyiv | Ukraine | Palace "Ukraine" | The Maneken |
| June 12, 2013 | Minsk | Belarus | Minsk-Arena | Markas Palubenka |
| June 14, 2013 | Riga | Latvia | Arēna Rīga | Iiris |
| June 16, 2013 | Helsinki | Finland | Hartwall Arena | Kari Tapiiri |
| July 5, 2013 (Note: The show on July 5, 2013 in Barcelona, Spain was a part of Festival Jardins de Pedralbes.) | Barcelona | Spain | Royal Palace of Pedralbes | L.A. |
| July 8, 2013 (Note: The show on July 8, 2013 in Malakasa, Greece was part of the Rockwave Festival.) | Malakasa (Note: Promoted as Athens) | Greece | Terra Vibe Park | —N/a |
Asia
| July 10, 2013 (Note: The show on July 10, 2013 in Byblos, Lebanon was part of the Byblos International Festival.) | Byblos (Note: Promoted as Beirut) | Lebanon | Byblos Seaside Amphitheater | The Wanton Bishops |
Europe
| July 15, 2013 (Note: The show on July 15, 2013 in Krasnogorsk, Russia, was originally scheduled to take place on June 8, 2013 but it was postponed due to Del Rey's throat infection.) | Krasnogorsk (Note: Promoted as Moscow) | Russia | Crocus City Hall | —N/a |
| July 17, 2013 (Note: The show on July 17, 2013 in Saint Petersburg, Russia, was originally scheduled to take place on June 6, 2013 but it was postponed due to Del Rey's throat infection.) | Saint Petersburg | Russia | Ice Palace | Andrei Samsonov & Laska Omnia |
North America
| August 1, 2013 (Note: The show on August 1, 2013 in Chicago was part of the Lollapalooza After Shows.) | Chicago | United States | House of Blues Chicago | Max Jury |
| August 2, 2013 (Note: The show on August 2, 2013 in Chicago was part of Lollapalooza.) | Chicago | United States | Grant Park | —N/a |
Europe
| September 20, 2013 (Note: The show on September 20, 2013 in Istanbul, Turkey, was originally scheduled to take place on July 7, 2013 but it was postponed due to Gezi Park protests.) | Istanbul | Turkey | KüçükÇiftlik Park | Yok Öyle Kararlı Şeyler |
Latin America
| November 4, 2013 | Mexico City | Mexico | Pepsi Center WTC | —N/a |
| November 7, 2013 | Belo Horizonte | Brazil | Chevrolet Hall | Silva |
| November 9, 2013 (Note: The show on November 8, 2013 in São Paulo, Brazil was part of the Planeta Terra Festival.) | São Paulo | Brazil | Campo de Marte Airport | —N/a |
| November 10, 2013 | Rio de Janeiro | Brazil | Citibank Hall | Silva |
| November 12, 2013 (Note: The show on November 12, 2013 in Santiago, Chile was part of the Indie Fun Fest.) | Santiago | Chile | Movistar Arena | —N/a |
| November 14, 2013 (Note: The show on November 12, 2013 in Buenos Aires, Argentina was part of the Planeta Terra Festival.) | Buenos Aires | Argentina | Tecnópolis | —N/a |
North America
| April 11, 2014 | Paradise (Note: Promoted as Las Vegas) | United States | The Chelsea | Born Casual |
| April 13, 2014 (Note: The shows on April 13 and 20, 2014 in Indio, California were part of the Coachella Valley Music and Arts Festival.) | Indio | United States | Empire Polo Club | —N/a |
| April 15, 2014 | Phoenix | United States | Comerica Theatre | —N/a |
| April 18, 2014 | San Francisco | United States | Bill Graham Civic Auditorium | —N/a |
| April 20, 2014 | Indio | United States | Empire Polo Club | —N/a |
| April 23, 2014 | Grand Prairie | United States | Verizon Theatre at Grand Prairie | —N/a |
| April 25, 2014 (Note: The show on April 24, 2014 in New Orleans, Louisiana was originally planned to take place at The Sugar Mill, but the venue was upgraded due to popular demand.) | New Orleans | United States | Bold Sphere Music | —N/a |
| April 27, 2014 | Miami | United States | The Fillmore Miami Beach | —N/a |
| April 28, 2014 | Orlando | United States | Hard Rock Live | —N/a |
| May 1, 2014 | Atlanta | United States | Tabernacle | Jimmy Gnecco |
| May 2, 2014 | Nashville | United States | Ryman Auditorium | Jimmy Gnecco |
| May 5, 2014 | Montreal | Canada | Bell Centre | Jimmy Gnecco |
| May 6, 2014 | Boston | United States | House of Blues Boston | Jimmy Gnecco |
| May 8, 2014 | Wallingford | United States | Toyota Oakdale Theatre | Jimmy Gnecco |
| May 10, 2014 (Note: The show on May 10, 2014 in Columbia, Maryland was part of the Sweetlife Festival.) | Columbia | United States | Merriweather Post Pavilion | —N/a |
| May 11, 2014 | Philadelphia | United States | Skyline Stage at the Mann | Jimmy Gnecco |
| May 13, 2014 | Toronto | Canada | Sony Centre for the Performing Arts | Jimmy Gnecco |
| May 15, 2014 | Detroit | United States | Masonic Temple Theater | Jimmy Gnecco |
| May 16, 2014 | Chicago | United States | Aragon Ballroom | Jimmy Gnecco |
| May 19, 2014 | Morrison | United States | Red Rocks Amphitheatre | Jimmy Gnecco |
| May 25, 2014 | Vancouver | Canada | PNE Amphitheatre | Father John Misty |
| May 27, 2014 | Seattle | United States | WaMu Theater | Father John Misty |
| May 30, 2014 | Los Angeles | United States | Shrine Exposition Hall | Father John Misty |
Europe
| June 13, 2014 (Note: The show on June 13, 2014 in Aarhus, Denmark was part of the NorthSide Festival.) | Aarhus | Denmark | Ådalen | —N/a |
| June 14, 2014 (Note: The show on June 14, 2014 in Bergen, Norway was part of Bergenfest.) | Bergen | Norway | Bergenhus Fortress | —N/a |
| June 20, 2014 (Note: The show on June 20, 2014 in Berlin, Germany was part of the Citadel Music Festival.) | Berlin | Germany | Spandau Citadel | Max Jury |
| June 21, 2014 (Note: The show on June 21, 2014 in Paris, France was part of Fête de la Musique.) | Paris | France | Olympia | —N/a |
| June 26, 2014 (Note: The show on June 26, 2014 in Norrköping, Sweden was part of Bråvalla Festival.) | Norrköping | Sweden | Bråvalla Wing | —N/a |
| June 29, 2014 (Note: The show on June 29, 2014 in Pilton, England was part of Glastonbury Festival.) | Pilton | England | Worthy Farm | —N/a |
| July 4, 2014 (Note: The show on July 4, 2014 in Monaco City, Monaco was part of Monte-Carlo Sporting Summer Festival.) | Monaco | | Monte-Carlo Sporting | —N/a |
| July 5, 2014 (Note: The show on July 5, 2014 in Vilanova i la Geltrú, Spain was part of the Vida Festival.) | Vilanova i la Geltrú | Spain | Masia d'en Cabanyes | —N/a |
| July 15, 2014 (Note: The show on July 15, 2014 in Cork, Ireland was part of Live at the Marquee.) | Cork | Ireland | Docklands | Max Jury |
| July 17, 2014 (Note: The show on July 17, 2014 in Carcassonne, France was part of the Carcassonne Festival.) | Carcassonne | France | Jean-Deschamps Theatre | —N/a |
| August 24, 2014 (Note: The show on August 24, 2014 in Saint-Cloud, France was part of Rock en Seine.) | Saint-Cloud | France | Domaine National de Saint-Cloud | —N/a |
North America
| September 20, 2014 (Note: The show on September 20, 2014 in Atlanta was part of Music Midtown.) | Atlanta | United States | Piedmont Park | —N/a |
| October 4, 2014 (Note: The shows on October 4 and 11, 2014 in Austin, Texas were part of the Austin City Limits Music Festival.) | Austin | United States | Zilker Park | —N/a |
| October 6, 2014 | Mexico City | Mexico | National Auditorium | —N/a |
| October 7, 2014 | Mexico City | Mexico | National Auditorium | —N/a |
| October 9, 2014 | Monterrey | Mexico | Cintermex | —N/a |
| October 11, 2014 | Austin | United States | Zilker Park | —N/a |
| October 17, 2014 | Los Angeles | United States | Hollywood Forever Cemetery | Carlos Gabriel Niño |
| October 18, 2014 | Los Angeles | United States | Hollywood Forever Cemetery | Carlos Gabriel Niño |

=== Cancelled shows ===
List of cancelled concerts showing date, city, country, venue and reason for cancellation
| Date | City | Country | Venue | Reason |
|---|---|---|---|---|
| August 20, 2014 | Tel Aviv | Israel | Tel Aviv Convention Center | 2014 Gaza War |

=== Box office score data ===
| Venue | City | Attendance | Revenue |
|---|---|---|---|
| Barclays Arena | Hamburg | 9,489 / 10,532 (90%) | $461,282 |
| Shrine Exposition Hall | Los Angeles | 4,850 / 4,850 (100%) | $266,750 |
