= Dark Paradise =

2013 single by Lana Del Rey

Single by Lana Del Rey

from the album Born to Die
- Released: March 1, 2013
- Studio: The Cutting Room (New York, NY)
- Genre: Trip hop
- Length: 4:03 (album version); 3:52 (radio version)
- Label: Universal; Vertigo
- Songwriters: Elizabeth Grant; Rick Nowels
- Producer: Emile Haynie

Lana Del Rey singles chronology
"Ride" (2012)	"Dark Paradise" (2013)	"Young and Beautiful" (2013)

Licensed audio
- "Dark Paradise" on YouTube

"Dark Paradise" is a song recorded by the American singer-songwriter Lana Del Rey for her second album, Born to Die (2012). It was written by Lana Del Rey and Rick Nowels, while production was handled by Emile Haynie. Nowels and Devrim Karaoglu produced the radio mix of the song. The song was released on March 1, 2013, by Universal and Vertigo Records, as the sixth and final single from Born to Die.

The song received mainly mixed reviews from critics, with many criticizing her melodramatic performance, and also the repetition of production and lyrical content. However, many believed the attraction of the criticism proved it as a highlight. Noticeably less successful than other singles from the album, "Dark Paradise" managed to gain some commercial success in Central Europe, becoming a top five hit on Polish airplay.

== Background and release ==
In an interview in June 2012, Del Rey said she would not release the song as a single but did plan to release a music video in September 2012. However, no music video was released, and on January 29, 2013, an official radio edit of "Dark Paradise" was serviced to German radio stations. On the same day, it was announced that the song would serve as the fifth single in Austria and Germany, and the sixth single in Switzerland. It was released as a digital download in the three countries on March 1, 2013.

== Lyrics and composition ==
Billboard said about the song's lyrics: "Del Rey once again declares her undying love for her bad-boy lover," adding that the song's melody "recalls late-'80s Madonna".

== Critical reception ==
The song garnered mixed reviews from critics. Most critical reviews came from the melodramatic tone of the song, along with the lyrical content and repetitive production. Billboard gave the song a negative review, saying that "fatigue sets in" when this song comes up on the album, and that the song "would be a subpar ballad for Del Rey" even if she had never released "Blue Jeans" or "Video Games". Jaime Gill from BBC Music used the song as an example as why Born to Die isn't perfect, saying that "it slumps slightly towards the end, and the glossy trip-hop production grows wearying on lesser [G]othic melodramas like 'Dark Paradise'." David Edwards from Drowned in Sound said along with "Carmen" that they weren't the best tracks on the album, saying, "The dreary fallen angel whimsy of 'Carmen' sums up precisely the unfocused drift that critics often use to malign her and on songs such as 'Dark Paradise', the caricature extends beyond our empathy."

On the other hand, many critics believed that the criticism towards the song attracted it as a standout towards the album. Los Angeles Times named it among the best tracks on the album along with "Video Games" and "Summertime Sadness". MuuMuse highlighted the album as a standout, saying "Yet beneath the song's gothic exterior lies an deeply romantic sentiment, suggesting that love trumps all circumstances—even death [...]"

Rolling Stone magazine ranked it 46th in their list of 50 best Lana Del Rey songs, and said although it was the album's weakest single, the song was a "Tumblr-era earworm". Similarly, Alexis Petridis of The Guardian said the melodies of "Dark Paradise" effortlessly "sweep the listener along with them." Billboard said the melodies were reminiscent of Madonna's sound in the late 1980s and called the song a "subpar ballad".

== Track listings ==
All tracks are written by Lana Del Rey and Rick Nowels.

CD single and digital download
No.	Title	Producer(s)	Length
1.	"Dark Paradise" (radio mix)	Nowels; Devrim Karaoglu	3:52
2.	"Dark Paradise"	Emile Haynie	4:04
Total length:			7:56

== Credits and personnel ==
Credits adapted from the liner notes of Born to Die and Dark Paradise.

Performance

- Lana Del Rey – vocals
- Maria Vidal – additional vocals

Instruments

- Emile Haynie – drums, keyboard
- Devrim Karaoglu – additional synthesizer, orchestral drums
- Rick Nowels – guitar
- Dean Reid – pads
- Patrick Warren – chamberlain strings

Technical and production

- John Davis – mastering
- Chris Galland – mixing assistant
- Larry Gold – string arrangement, conductor
- Emile Haynie – production (album version)
- Devrim Karaoglu – production (radio mix)
- Erik Madrid – mixing assistant
- Manny Marroquin – mixing
- Rick Nowels – co-production (album version); production (radio mix)
- Steve Tirpak – string assistant

== Charts ==
Chart (2013)	Peak position
Austria (Ö3 Austria Top 40)	42
Germany (GfK)	45
Poland Airplay (ZPAV)	5
Switzerland (Schweizer Hitparade)	48

== Certifications ==
Region	Certification	Certified units/sales
Australia (ARIA)	Platinum	70,000^{‡}
Austria (IFPI Austria)	Gold	15,000^{*}
New Zealand (RMNZ)	Platinum	30,000^{‡}
United Kingdom (BPI)	Gold	400,000^{‡}
United States (RIAA)	Platinum	1,000,000^{‡}
^{*} Sales figures based on certification alone.^{‡} Sales+streaming figures based on certification alone.

== Release history ==
Country	Date	Format(s)	Label
Austria	March 1, 2013	CD single; digital download	Vertigo; Universal
Germany	March 1, 2013	CD single; digital download	Vertigo; Universal
Switzerland	March 1, 2013	CD single; digital download	Vertigo; Universal
