= Bradley Soileau =

American model, DJ, producer, and designer

- Born: Bradley Chedester Cabaness-Soileau; March 27, 1986 (age 40); Baton Rouge, Louisiana, U.S.
- Occupations: Model, DJ, producer, designer
- Spouse: Porcelain Black (m. 2012; div. 2014)
- Modeling information
- Height: 6 ft 1 in (1.85 m)
- Hair color: Auburn (dyed blonde)
- Eye color: Gray
- Agency: Red Model Management (NY)
- Waist: 31 (US)
- Inseam: 33 (US)

Bradley Chedester Cabaness-Soileau (born March 27, 1986), known professionally as Bradley Soileau, is an American model, DJ, and designer known for appearing in Lana Del Rey's music videos "Blue Jeans" (2012), "Born to Die" (2012), and "West Coast" (2014).

== Personal life ==
He is of French, German, and Spanish descent. He has mentioned having a stepmother and stepfather. He said his last name is pronounced like "swallow".

In April 2012, he married singer Porcelain Black. They divorced in 2014.

On August 18, 2021 Soileau was diagnosed with cirrhosis.

== Public image ==
=== Tattoos ===
Soileau is commonly noted for his tattoos. He has one on his forehead that reads "War inside my head" which is a reference Suicidal Tendencies' song "War Inside My Head". He has zombie praying hands from his temple to down below his ear.

== Artistry ==
His clothing design has caught the attention of Vogue's Kelly Conner for its unique blend of styles.

== Filmography ==
=== Music videos ===
Year	Title	Artist	Role
2012	"Born to Die"	Lana Del Rey	Love interest
2012	"Blue Jeans"	Lana Del Rey	Love interest
2014	"West Coast"	Lana Del Rey	Love interest
2015	"A Study in Duality"	Brooke Candy	Member of "Fag Mob"
2015	"Escape"	Zimmer, Emilie Adams	
2019	"Noid"	Yves Tumor	Police officer
2022	"The Man For You"	Patriarchy	The Husband
