= Born to Die Tour =

2011–2012 concert tour by Lana Del Rey

- World tour by Lana Del Rey
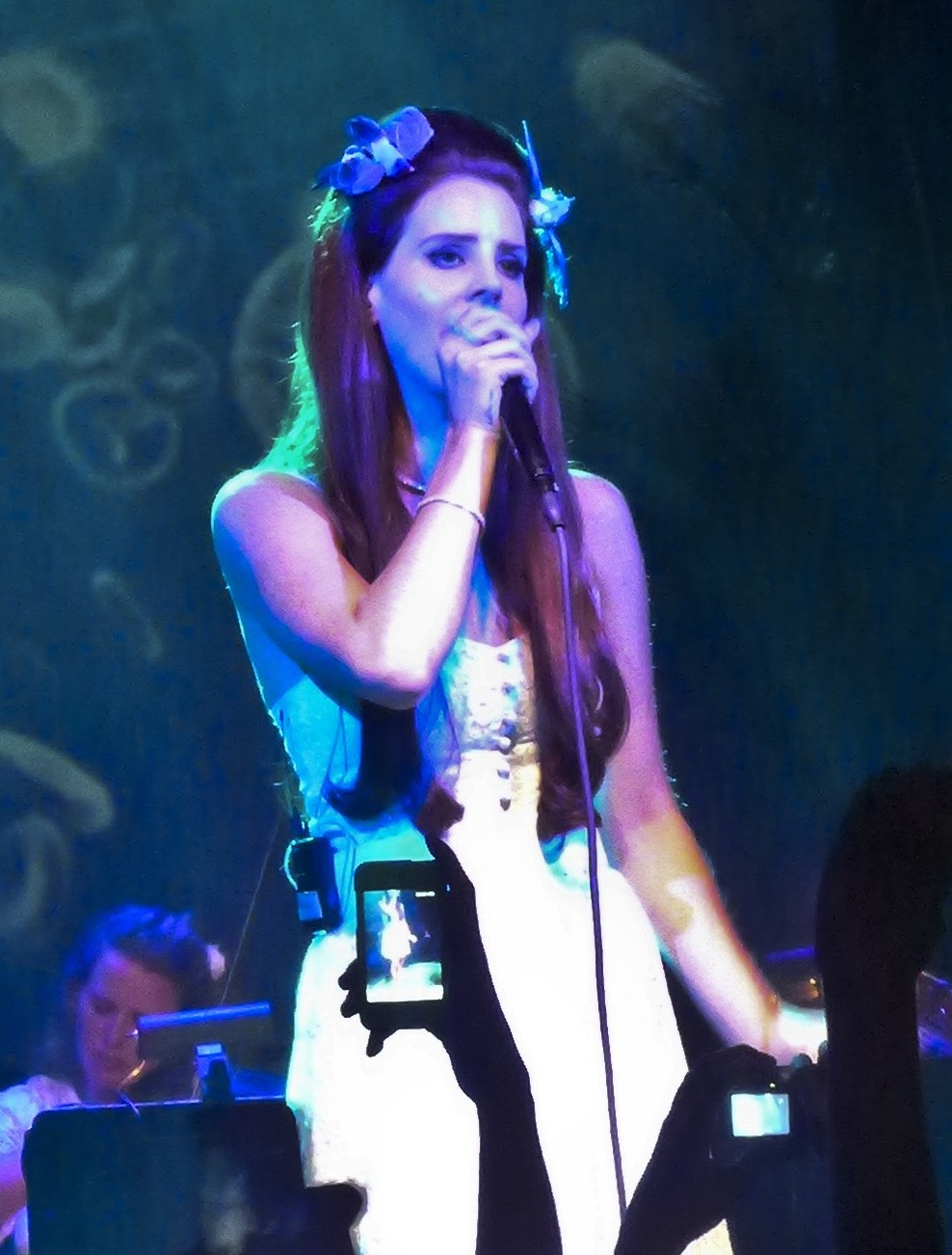
- Del Rey performing at the Irving Plaza in New York City on June 7, 2012.
- Location: Europe; North America; Australia
- Associated album: Born to Die
- Start date: November 4, 2011
- End date: September 25, 2012
- No. of shows: 24 in Europe; 9 in North America; 6 in Australia; 40 in total
- Supporting acts: Jake Bugg; Jarrod Gorbel; Zach Heckendorf; Zebra Katz; Vince Kidd; Benjamin Francis Leftwich; Seye; Oliver Tank; Woodkid

Lana Del Rey concert chronology
- Born to Die Tour (2011–12); Paradise Tour (2013–14)

The Born to Die Tour was the first concert tour by American singer-songwriter Lana Del Rey, in support of her second studio and major-label debut album, Born to Die (2012). The tour began on November 4, 2011, at The Ruby Lounge in Manchester, England and ended on September 25, 2012, at the Roundhouse in London, England. The tour visited cities in thirteen countries across three continents.

== Background ==
Lana Del Rey released her debut album Lana Del Ray on January 4, 2010. Having been released on an independent record label, it was removed from stores after the label's bankruptcy, and Del Rey was never given the chance to have a proper tour for it. Del Rey released her second studio album Born to Die through Interscope and Polydor Records on January 27, 2012. To promote the album, Del Rey would perform its singles on television shows in North America and Europe, prior to its release.

Lana Del Rey announced her first proper concert tour, the Born to Die Tour, in August and September 2011, at the time featuring a schedule of just four shows at very small venues. However, after the shows sold out in a shorter amount of time than expected, the original four shows were postponed and moved to larger venues, along with the announcement of more dates.

On September 14, 2011, prior to the beginning of the tour, Del Rey headlined a secret concert at the Glasslands Gallery under the name "Queen of Coney Island".

After the album's release, Del Rey altered the setlist to feature more songs that had previously been unreleased.

== Tour dates ==
List of concerts, showing date, city, country, venue, and opening act
Date	City	Country	Venue	Opening act
Europe
November 4, 2011	Manchester	England	The Ruby Lounge	Seye
November 5, 2011	Glasgow	Scotland	Òran Mór	Seye
November 7, 2011	Paris	France	Nouveau Casino	Seye
November 10, 2011	Amsterdam	Netherlands	Paradiso (Note: (upper floor stage))	Seye
November 12, 2011	Cologne	Germany	Gebäude 9	Seye
November 14, 2011	Berlin	Germany	Roter Salon	Seye
November 16, 2011	London	England	Scala	Seye; Vince Kidd
November 17, 2011	Birmingham (Note: Promoted as Digbeth)	England	HMV Institute: The Library	Seye; Jake Bugg
November 22, 2011	London	England	Bassoon Bar	—N/a
November 23, 2011	Paris	France	L’Album de la Semaine	—N/a
North America
November 30, 2011	Toronto	Canada	Mod Club Theatre	—N/a
December 5, 2011 (Note: The December 5, 2011 show at the Bowery Ballroom was originally scheduled for September 21, 2011, at The Box, but was postponed and moved to the larger venue due to high demand.)	New York	United States	Bowery Ballroom	Zach Heckendorf
December 7, 2011 (Note: The December 7, 2011 show at the Troubadour was originally scheduled for September 27, 2011, at The Hotel Café, but was postponed and moved to the larger venue due to high demand.)	West Hollywood	United States	Troubadour	Zach Heckendorf
Europe
April 10, 2012	London	England	The Jazz Cafe	—N/a
North America
June 3, 2012	Los Angeles	United States	El Rey Theatre	Jarrod Gorbel
June 4, 2012	Los Angeles	United States	El Rey Theatre	Zebra Katz
June 5, 2012	Los Angeles	United States	El Rey Theatre	Zebra Katz
June 7, 2012	New York	United States	Irving Plaza	Zebra Katz
June 8, 2012	New York	United States	Irving Plaza	Zebra Katz
June 10, 2012	New York	United States	Irving Plaza	Zebra Katz
Europe
June 15, 2012 (Note: The show on June 15, 2012 was part of Sónar Barcelona festival.)	L'Hospitalet de Llobregat (Note: Promoted as Barcelona)	Spain	Fira Barcelona Gran Via	—N/a
June 17, 2012 (Note: The show on June 17, 2012 was part of the Lovebox Festival.)	London	England	Victoria Park	—N/a
June 22, 2012 (Note: The show on June 22, 2012 was part of the Isle of Wight Festival.)	Newport	England	Seaclose Park	—N/a
June 24, 2012 (Note: The show on June 24, 2012 was part of Radio 1's Hackney Weekend.)	London	England	Hackney Marshes	—N/a
June 27, 2012 (Note: The show on June 27, 2012, was part of Hove Festival.)	Arendal	Norway	Tromøya	—N/a
June 29, 2012 (Note: The show on June 29, 2012 was part of Rock Werchter festival.)	Rotselaar	Belgium	Festivalpark Werchter	—N/a
July 1, 2012 (Note: The show on July 1, 2012 was part of the Eurockéennes festival.)	Sermamagny	France	Presqu'île du Malsaucy	—N/a
July 4, 2012 (Note: The show on July 4, 2012, was part of Montreux Jazz Festival.)	Montreux	Switzerland	Miles Davis Hall	Woodkid
July 5, 2012 (Note: The show on July 5, 2012, was part of the House Festival.)	London	England	Chiswick House	—N/a
July 6, 2012 (Note: The show on July 6, 2012, was part of the Super Bock Super Rock festival.)	Lisbon	Portugal	Cabeço da Flauta	—N/a
July 12, 2012 (Note: The show on July 12, 2012, was part of Latitude Festival.)	Southwold	England	Henham Park	—N/a
July 15, 2012 (Note: The show on July 15, 2012, was part of Melt! Festival.)	Gräfenhainichen	Germany	Ferropolis	—N/a
Oceania
July 21, 2012 (Note: The show on July 21, 2012, was part of Spin Off Festival.)	Adelaide	Australia	Jubilee Pavilion	—N/a
July 23, 2012	Melbourne	Australia	Palace Theatre	Oliver Tank
July 24, 2012	Melbourne	Australia	Palace Theatre	Oliver Tank
July 26, 2012	Sydney	Australia	Enmore Theatre	Oliver Tank
July 27, 2012	Sydney	Australia	Enmore Theatre	Oliver Tank
July 28, 2012 (Note: The show on July 28, 2012, was part of the Splendour in the Grass festival.)	Byron Bay	Australia	Belongil Fields	—N/a
Europe
September 25, 2012 (Note: The show on September 25, 2012, was part of the iTunes Festival.)	London	England	Roundhouse	Benjamin Francis Leftwich

== Cancelled shows ==
List of cancelled concerts showing date, city, country, venue and reason for cancellation
Date	City	Country	Venue	Reason	Ref.
May 28, 2012	Tokyo	Japan	Duo Music Exchange	Extreme exhaustion	
