= Born to Die (Lana Del Rey song) =

2011 single by Lana Del Rey

Single by Lana Del Rey

from the album Born to Die
- Released: December 30, 2011
- Recorded: 2011
- Studio: Studio 13 (London, England)
- Genre: Pop; orchestral pop; trip hop
- Length: 4:46
- Label: Stranger; Interscope; Polydor
- Songwriters: Elizabeth Grant; Justin Parker
- Producers: Parker; Emile Haynie

Lana Del Rey singles chronology
"Video Games" (2011)	"Born to Die" (2011)	"Blue Jeans" (2012)

Music video
- "Born to Die" on YouTube

"Born to Die" is a song by American singer-songwriter Lana Del Rey, taken from her debut major-label and second studio album of the same name. The song was released as the singer's second single on December 30, 2011, through Interscope Records. Musically, "Born to Die" is a pop and trip hop ballad that speaks of a doomed relationship. Critics noted that it features apocalyptic lyrics and strings similar to John Barry compositions. It received a mixed to positive reception from contemporary critics, who praised the song's cinematic arrangement and haunting vocal performance by Del Rey. In 2019, Billboard included the song as one of the 100 songs that defined the 2010s, adding that it influenced "a sonic shift that completely changed the pop landscape". In the United Kingdom, "Born to Die" became Del Rey's second top 10 single, when it peaked at No. 9 for the week ending February 4, 2012.

The song was promoted with a music video, directed by French artist Yoann Lemoine (also known as Woodkid), that portrays Del Rey in an unstable relationship with her boyfriend, played by model Bradley Soileau, as they go on a car trip that results in her death. At the 2012 UK Music Video Awards, "Born to Die" won the "Best Pop – International Video" award, outranking her other songs "Blue Jeans" and "National Anthem" which were also nominees. Critical reception for the video was generally positive. The video has received over 650 million views on video-sharing website YouTube.

== Background and composition ==
"Born to Die"
A 28-second sample of the song's final chorus which recalls the music scores of Gone with the Wind (1939) and Western (1997).

"Born to Die" was written and composed by Del Rey and Justin Parker, and produced by Emile Haynie. It is a pop and trip hop ballad, and features hip hop-influenced beats and string arrangements in its instrumentation. The song features "gently apocalyptic" lyrics, and opens with Del Rey singing "Feet don't fail me now/ Take me to the finish line/ Oh my heart, it breaks every step that I take/ But I'm hoping at the gates, they'll tell me that you're mine." According to the singer, the song is a "homage to true love and a tribute to living life on the wild side", theme that is perceived in lines such as "Let me kiss you hard in the pouring rain, you like your girls insane." In a live performance prior to the release of the single, Del Rey sang "Let me fuck you hard in the pouring rain" instead of "Let me kiss you hard in the pouring rain"; this version continues to be sung at most of her live shows. Laura Snapes of NME compared the background to "melted chocolate waterslide, buffeted by impeccable production", with the John Barry-esque "whipping strings" being noted as similar to the music scores of Gone with the Wind (1939) and Western (1997). "Born to Die" was first released on December 30, 2011, as the second single from the album of the same name. It contains a vocal sample of "Long Red" by Leslie West.

== Critical reception ==
Following the release of the single, Robert Copsey of Digital Spy commented, "we thought it would be near-impossible for Lana to top the chilling 'Video Games', but her new cut – the title track from her forthcoming album – may just have out-haunted its predecessor." Laura Snapes of NME considered the song not "quite as flooring as 'Video Games', but then that song is fairly extraordinary", while Entertainment Weekly contributor Grady Smith considered it a "beautifully dour tune".

Priya Elan also of NME said the song "is a grower and whilst not as pitch perfect as 'Video Games', it's pretty damn fine". Aaron-Spencer Charles of Metro noted "Lana Del Rey's Born to Die is a slow yet strong song, with Lana singing about her relationship experience over an orchestra. The calm tone of Del Rey's voice sets sad-love mood really well." Tim Lee of musicOMH said the song is "essentially 'Video Games' with percussion", and noted that "her (alleged) agents clearly having stumbled upon a formula with which they can (allegedly) print money and (allegedly) further consign Lana's secretive, (allegedly) real debut LP to the annals of history. You didn't hear it from us, right?"

== Music video ==
=== Production and composition ===
The music video for "Born to Die" was based on a concept created by Del Rey, and it was directed by Yoann Lemoine, who previously worked with Katy Perry on "Teenage Dream" (2010) and Taylor Swift on "Back to December" (2010). Del Rey wrote the concept in the form of a treatment she titled, "The Lonely Queen" The video was intended to be set in heaven, metaphorically represented by a Romanian castle. While the narrator was flanked by tigers, she would recall memories of being with her beloved. Lemoine took Del Rey's concept and reworked it into something feasible, she said, and she was satisfied with the outcome. Unlike the singer's previous music videos, "Born to Die" had a significantly higher budget and production, with film location taking place at the Palace of Fontainebleau in France. On December 14, 2011, the music video leaked online before the official release; this was followed by a statement released through the singer's Facebook page, which said, "Generally, I'm a man of few words, but I will say that this video is the most beautiful thing I've ever done. I hope you like it – this isn't the time or way I wanted to show you the video but I'm in Beijing with no access to social media, and the videos have been leaked from Russia so someone is posting this for me."

Bradley Soileau plays Del Rey's fictional boyfriend in the video and was interviewed numerous times about the role. Billboard asked if his proximity to Del Rey caused him to become erect, to which he replied: "Embracing her [Del Rey] was easy. Everyone asks the same question, did you have a boner? Ha! No, I didn't. There's a huge crew of people staring at you shouting, moving around, bright lights everywhere. Madness." The model landed the role when Armen Djerrahian photographed him for an interview with The Wild. Djerrahian knew Lemoine and arranged an introduction. He did not meet Del Rey until the day of the video shoot. Recalling the experience, he applauded the production team, saying they were agreeable coworkers, highlighting Del Rey as a soulful and amazing personality. He identified with background dancers and actresses in rap music videos, as they are often sultry and objectified. About his role, he told MTV:

"...the back story. I'm her boyfriend. It's basically like, the boyfriend, you can see the two sides of the relationship where I'm kissing her, then pointing a gun at her head. That's what it is. It's a relationship that is so terrible but neither of them want to leave. That's why when she is in the car, and she wipes the glass, she's looking mad sad, distant, thoughtful. But I’m still trying to get her attention. That's kinda the story for it.

Del Rey said she agreed to allow Soileau to play her fictional boyfriend because he reminded her of a previous lover, namely the one she had written the original concept about.

=== Plot summary ===
The video begins with Del Rey seen standing topless in the arms of a tattooed man, played by model Bradley Soileau, with the American flag as a backdrop. This is actually an animated version of the single cover art. The scene is followed by the singer leaving her home and joining her boyfriend for a long car trip. As they enter the car, they start to smoke marijuana together and make out before leaving. While on the road, the relationship of the couple is revealed to be unstable, as Del Rey is forced to kiss her boyfriend while expressing sadness. The trip intercuts with scenes of the couple staying at a luxurious hotel, where they are seen lying on a bed together with the boyfriend ominously holding Del Rey's throat at one point. As Del Rey makes her way out the hotel, the scene cuts back to an apparent car accident, with the singer's bloodied corpse being carried by her lover as a huge fire burns behind them. Also, the video intercuts scenes shot at the Palace of Fontainebleau, showing Del Rey sitting on a throne with tigers beside her in the Trinity Chapel or walking in the Gallery of Francis I. The video ends with the opening scene.

=== Reception ===
Jason Lipshutz of Billboard compared the car scenes to the ones of Rihanna's music video for "We Found Love"; Ann Lee of Metro considered the music video "sexy", with Rolling Stone journalist Matthew Perpetura noting that, "just like the song itself, it's bleakly romantic and majestic in its scope." The music video won Best Pop Video – International at the UK Music Video Awards, and was nominated for Best Art Direction at the MTV Video Music Awards.

== Live performances and influence on other media ==
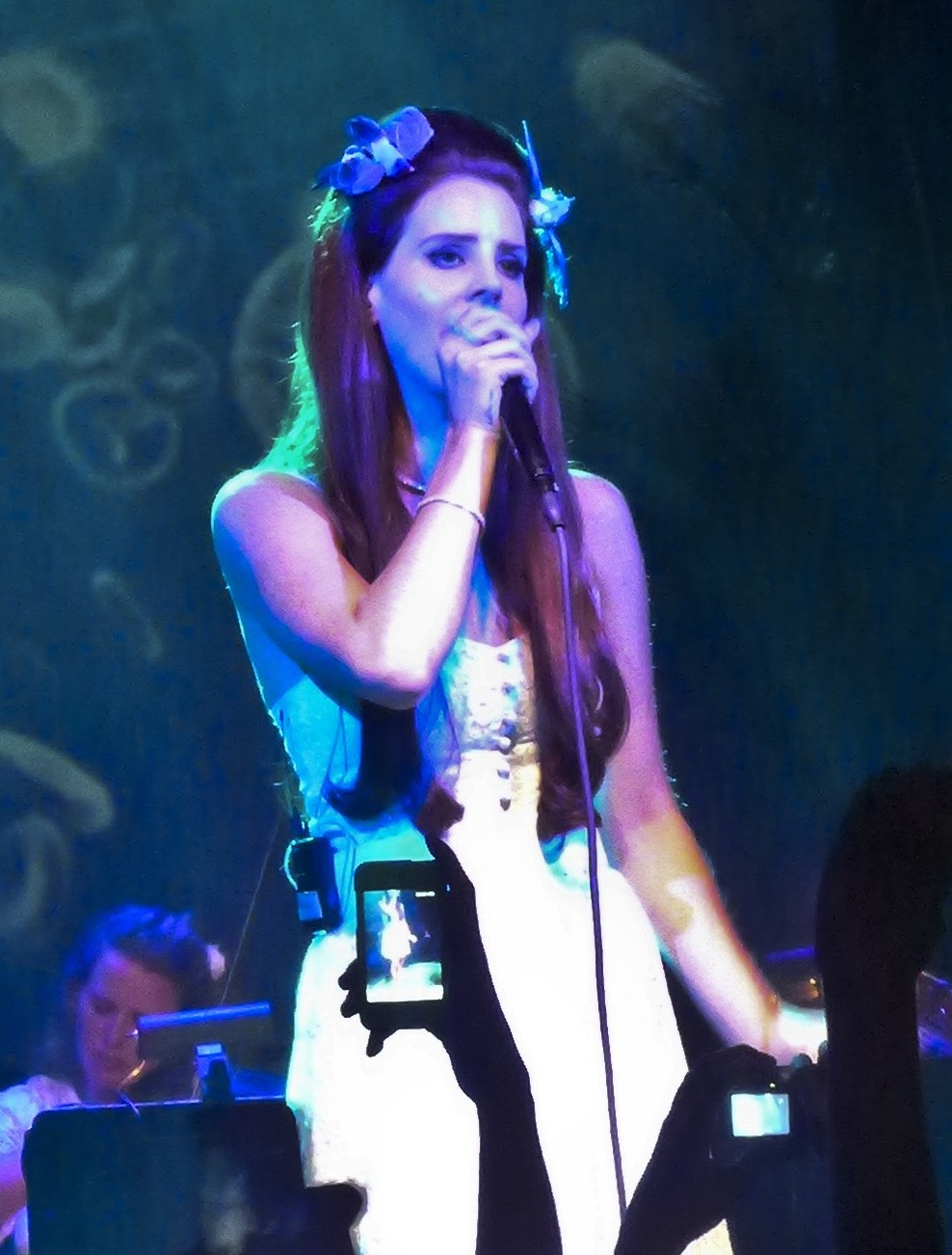
Del Rey performing "Born to Die" at Irving Plaza during her Born to Die Tour (2012)

"Born to Die" was performed by Del Rey in a number of live appearances, including at the Bowery Ballroom, where, according to Eliot Glazer of New York, "the polarizing indie hipstress brought her 'gangsta Nancy Sinatra' swagu." Matthew Perpetua of Rolling Stone commented that, despite Del Rey being nervous and anxious while performing the song live, the singer "sang with considerable confidence, though her transitions from husky, come-hither sexuality to bratty, girlish petulance could be rather jarring." Del Rey also performed the song on an intimate show at Chateau Marmont in Los Angeles. She performed an acoustic version of the track alongside "Video Games" at a BBC Radio 6 Music live session, which became her first radio session in the United Kingdom. Del Rey later appeared at 2012 Radio 1's Hackney Weekend performing various tracks of Born to Die, including the song of the same name.

In February 2018, British rapper Dave covered "Born to Die" during his performance on BBC Radio 1's Live Lounge. An excerpt of the song was used in the promotion of New Zealand TV Drama Shortland Street for the 2014 season. The song was used in the final scene and credits of the 2014 Xavier Dolan film Mommy. The song was also used in the trailer for the 2014 film Gimme Shelter, starring Vanessa Hudgens.

== Formats and track listings ==
- 7-inch vinyl
1. "Born to Die"
2. "Born to Die" (Woodkid & the Shoes remix)
- CD single
1. "Born to Die" (album version) – 4:46
2. "Video Games" (Rainer Weichhold & Nick Olivetti radio edit) – 3:50
- The Remix EP
1. "Born to Die" (album version) – 4:49
2. "Born to Die" (PDP / 13 remix) – 6:24
3. "Born to Die" (Woodkid & the Shoes remix) – 4:03
4. "Born to Die" (Parrade remix) – 5:47
5. "Born to Die" (Chad Valley remix) – 3:46
6. "Video Games" (Rainer Weichhold & Nick Olivetti clubmix) – 7:43

== Credits and personnel ==
Credits adapted from the liner notes of Born to Die.

=== Recording and management ===
- Mastered at Metropolis Mastering (London, England)
- Published by EMI / Sony ATV (ASCAP)

=== Personnel ===
- Lana Del Rey – vocals
- Ken Lewis – additional vocal noises
- Jeff Bhasker – guitar
- Larry Gold – string arrangements, conductor
- Steve Tirpak – string assistant
- Emile Haynie – drums, keyboards, production
- Justin Parker – vocal production
- Brent Kolatalo – additional recording
- Dan Grech-Marguerat – mixing
- Duncan Fuller – mixing assistant

== Charts ==
=== Weekly charts ===
Weekly chart performance for "Born to Die"
Chart (2012)	Peak position
Australia (ARIA)	34
Austria (Ö3 Austria Top 40)	10
Belgium (Ultratop 50 Flanders)	14
Belgium (Ultratop 50 Wallonia)	10
Croatia International Airplay (HRT)	3
Czech Republic Airplay (ČNS IFPI)	45
Denmark (Tracklisten)	7
Finland (Suomen virallinen lista)	13
France (SNEP)	13
Germany (GfK)	29
Iceland (Tónlist)	6
Ireland (IRMA)	12
Israel (Media Forest)	8
Italy (FIMI)	15
Netherlands (Single Top 100)	89
Portugal (Billboard Portugal)	9
Scottish Singles Sales (Official Charts)	10
Slovakia Airplay (ČNS IFPI)	53
South Korea International Singles (Gaon)	98
Spain (Promusicae)	41
Sweden (Sverigetopplistan)	59
Switzerland (Schweizer Hitparade)	13
UK Singles (Official Charts)	9
US Rock Digital Singles (Billboard)	31

=== Year-end charts ===
Year-end chart performance for "Born to Die"
Chart (2012)	Position
Belgium (Ultratop Flanders)	98
Belgium (Ultratop Wallonia)	84
France (SNEP)	97
Italy (FIMI)	92
Poland (ZPAV)	20
UK Singles (OCC)	95

== Certifications ==
Certifications and sales for "Born to Die"
Region	Certification	Certified units/sales
Australia (ARIA)	2× Platinum	140,000^{‡}
Austria (IFPI Austria)	Platinum	30,000^{*}
Brazil (Pro-Música Brasil)	Diamond	250,000^{‡}
Canada (Music Canada)	Gold	40,000^{*}
Denmark (IFPI Danmark)	Platinum	90,000^{‡}
Germany (BVMI)	Gold	150,000^{‡}
Italy (FIMI)	Platinum	30,000^{‡}
New Zealand (RMNZ)	2× Platinum	60,000^{‡}
Spain (Promusicae)	Gold	30,000^{‡}
United Kingdom (BPI)	Platinum	600,000^{‡}
United States (RIAA)	3× Platinum	3,000,000^{‡}
^{*} Sales figures based on certification alone.^{‡} Sales+streaming figures based on certification alone.

== Release history ==
Release dates for "Born to Die"
Country	Date	Format	Ref.
Singapore	December 30, 2011	Digital download	
Luxembourg	January 2, 2012	Digital download	
Finland	January 2, 2012	Digital download	
France	January 2, 2012	Digital download	
Norway	January 2, 2012	Digital download	
Portugal	January 2, 2012	Digital download	
Australia	January 3, 2012	Digital download	
New Zealand	January 3, 2012	Digital download	
Sweden	January 9, 2012	Digital download	
Spain	January 10, 2012	Digital download	
Italy	January 17, 2012	Digital download	
Ireland	January 20, 2012	Digital download	
United Kingdom	January 22, 2012	Digital download	
United Kingdom	January 23, 2012	7" vinyl	
Switzerland	January 23, 2012	Digital download	
Austria	March 23, 2012	Digital download (Remixes EP)	
Germany	March 23, 2012	CD (single); CD (Remixes EP); digital download	
