= Blue Jeans (Lana Del Rey song) =

2012 single by Lana Del Rey

Single by Lana Del Rey

from the album Born to Die
- A-side: "Video Games"
- B-side: "Carmen"
- Released: March 30, 2012
- Recorded: 2011
- Genre: Gothic pop; sadcore; trip hop
- Length: 3:30
- Label: Interscope; Polydor; Stranger
- Songwriters: Lana Del Rey; Emile Haynie; Dan Heath
- Producer: Emile Haynie

Lana Del Rey singles chronology
"Born to Die" (2011)	"Blue Jeans" (2012)	"National Anthem" (2012)

Music video
- "Blue Jeans" on YouTube

"Blue Jeans" is a song by American singer-songwriter Lana Del Rey and the third single from her second studio album, Born to Die (2012). Interscope Records released the track to Italian radios on March 30, 2012. Del Rey wrote it with Dan Heath and producer Emile Haynie. The song combines sadcore, trip hop, and gothic pop over a balladic production.

Charting across Europe and Asia, "Blue Jeans" reached the top 10 in Belgium, Poland, and Israel. Three music videos were created for the song. The first was self-produced and the second shows Del Rey stands at a microphone in a bland room, accompanied by an electric guitarist. The third, which is the official one, was shot and directed by Yoann Lemoine, featuring film noir elements and crocodiles. A controversial performance of the song on Saturday Night Live placed Del Rey under scrutiny and polarized opinion, though the song itself received acclaim from critics.

== Background and composition ==
"Blue Jeans"
A 21 second sample of the song features Del Rey using lower vocals over a minimalist hip-hop influenced beat.

Originally put out as a double A-side with her debut song, "Video Games", it was also put as a B-side to the title track and second single, "Born to Die". It was later released as the third official single from Born to Die. Official remixes of "Blue Jeans" include ones by D/R/U/G/S, Blood Orange, Kris Menace, and RAC.

Critics described the genre of "Blue Jeans" as sadcore and gothic pop; Jon Dolan from Rolling Stone labelled the song a trip hop version of ZZ Top's "Sharp Dressed Man" (1983). Over a balladic production with surf rock guitar twangs following a basic chord progression of Fm-E♭-B♭, Del Rey sings, "Love is mean, and love hurts / But I still remember that day we met in December". Low fidelity string instruments soar over the refrain, as Del Rey belts: "I will love you till the end of time." Throughout the song, the instrumental includes a sampled audio clip of Rick James shouting "sing!".

== Critical reception ==
"Blue Jeans" received acclaim from critics. Robert Copsey of Digital Spy said "Blue Jeans" was "packed with vintage American grandeur as well as Del Rey's own menacing vocal as she holds out for her once-upon-a-time James Dean-esque lover - though we sincerely hope he hasn't met a similar end." MTV reviewer, Nicole James, compared the possible death in "Blue Jeans" to the drowning of Jack in Titanic, adding:

While we love LDR's whole "thing" she has going on, we're wondering when one of her videos is going to have a happy ending. How does she explain fairy tales to the kids she babysits? "And then Prince Charming kissed Sleeping Beauty and they lived happily ever after... until he got lazy, stopped bathing regularly and became clinically obsessed with World of Warcraft.

The Huffington Post noted that "Blue Jeans" was faithful to Del Rey's musical formula of nostalgia and realism, combined by "artificial-yet-deep" lyrics.

Slant Magazine said that Del Rey "uses her impressive range to dazzling effect on, "Blue Jeans", comparing her delinquent lover to both cancer and her favorite sweater in what seems like one swooning breath". NME said that ''Blue Jeans' lush Chris Isaak shades shimmer like sea-spume on Helena Christensen's naked thighs as Del Rey longs for her James Dean". Sputnikmusic stated that it's reminiscent of the music in Quentin Tarantino's films and named it one of the best song on the album. Beats Per Minute said that "'Blue Jeans' would probably be described by Del Rey as 'gangsta Spaghetti Western', but, aside from its most basic of forced rhymes (''Cause I'mma ride or die / Whether you fail or fly / Well shit at least you tried'), it is still a clever spin on genre, sounding unique, even inspired". DOA magazine said that "The lyrics-centric story-telling 'Blue Jeans' slows it down a bit with a deliberate, but swinging beat as Lana delves into a relationship where the guy is a 'Big dreams / gangsta...' and the girl wants him to stop living that lifestyle. Midway into the song the pace speeds up and Lana crams in a lot of lyrics, keeping the rhymes tight and the emotions high, until it dissipates into a dreamy chorus with Lana proclaiming 'I will love you till the end of time'". No Ripcord said that "Just like in the dark ballad 'Blue Jeans', Del Rey sounds more comfortable when she tries to perform as a tough songstress". MusicOMH said that "'Video Games' and 'Blue Jeans', despite suffering Adele style levels of ubiquity in recent months, still sound achingly beautiful, both of them sounding like the saddest love songs ever written". Consequence of Sound said that "'Blue Jeans' and 'Video Games' inextricably link Del Rey's flaxen locks with starry-eyed classical instruments, providing the aural and visual irresistibility of a good montage".

In June 2018, Rolling Stone magazine named "Blue Jeans" the 35th-best song of the century thus far.

== Music videos ==
Three music videos were directed and produced for the song. The first video was uploaded onto her YouTube account on September 9, 2011. Just like for the video for her single "Video Games", she gathered old archive clips from the internet and filmed herself in front of her webcam. The opening scene of the self-produced video contains a snippet of Lawrence Ferlinghetti reading the Lord's Prayer from the film, The Last Waltz and features footage from Australian photographer Nirrimi Joy Firebrace's "tender-hearted" project. Throughout the video, Del Rey splices vampy screencaps of herself mouthing the lyrics with clips from home videos and paparazzi footage she found on YouTube. Among them are snippets of old cartoons, Las Vegas, gas stations, and Tupac Shakur.

A second video titled "Blue Jeans (Live at the Premises)" was filmed and released online. In the video, Del Rey stands at a microphone in a bland room, accompanied by an electric guitarist. The Huffington Post writer Mallika Rao commented on Del Rey's performance in the video, "Her voice is still surprisingly deep. She still catches it in her throat in studied vulnerability. Her lashes are still thick as wings, her lips still enormous. The implicit reference to Nancy Sinatra and her ancestral line of gloomy jazz, which fans find exciting, and critics call derivative, is still at work."

A new official music video was directed by French artist Yoann Lemoine, who directed the video for the previous single "Born to Die". Bradley Soileau plays Del Rey's love interest in the video just as he did in the music video for "Born to Die". Filmed in early March 2012, and released on March 19, the video contains elements of film noir and is shot entirely in black and white. The video was compared to Nick Cave's murder ballads and the discography of Chris Isaak. Set by a poolside of a 1950s Hollywood home, Del Rey and Soileau reunite for a tragic love story. Accompanied by slo-mo brooding and smoking scenes, there is a possible drowning and the appearance of a crocodile. Critics called the video "moody" and "retro".

== Live performances and widespread media usage ==
On January 14, 2012, Del Rey performed the song on American late-night live television sketch comedy and variety show Saturday Night Live. The performance received a strong media reaction, many calling scrutiny to Del Rey's potential as an artist. She was later defended by Daniel Radcliffe and Saturday Night Live performer, Kristen Wiig, who later protected Del Rey by performing as her in a skit. Embarrassed by the overwhelming amount of negative public reaction, Del Rey was forced to cancel her world tour. Following the release of the high-budgeted secondary music video, Del Rey performed the song live on The Voice UK, where critics believe she redeemed the panned SNL performance.

It also was performed at Le Grand Journal in France, on January 30. On April 13, 2012, Del Rey performed the track on Italian talk show Le Invasioni Barbariche of La 7. On April 28, 2012, Del Rey performed the track on the first series of The Voice UK - with the performance airing the following day on BBC One.

Bastille performed a mashup of "Blue Jeans" and Clint Mansell's "Lux Aeterna" on their mix tape, Other People's Heartache.

== Track listing ==
7-inch vinyl

1. "Blue Jeans" – 3:30
1. "Carmen" – 4:08

Digital download

1. "Blue Jeans" (album version, remastered) – 3:30
2. "Blue Jeans" (Gesaffelstein remix) – 4:36
3. "Blue Jeans" (Odd Future's the Internet mix) – 4:01
4. "Blue Jeans" (Blood Orange remix) – 3:31

Remixes EP 1

1. "Blue Jeans" (remastered) – 3:30
2. "Blue Jeans" (Gesaffelstein remix) – 4:35
3. "Blue Jeans" (Odd Future's the Internet mix) – 4:00
4. "Blue Jeans" (Blood Orange remix) – 3:31

Remixes EP 2

1. "Blue Jeans" (featuring Azealia Banks) (Smims & Belle remix) – 3:01
2. "Blue Jeans" (Gesaffelstein remix) – 4:35
3. "Blue Jeans" (RAC mix) – 3:38
4. "Blue Jeans" (Club Clique's Nothing Is Real remix) – 4:11
5. "Blue Jeans" (Kris Menace remix) – 6:41
6. "Blue Jeans" (Penguin Prison remix) – 5:36

French card sleeve single CD

1. "Blue Jeans" (album version)
2. "Blue Jeans" (Club Clique's Nothing Is Real remix)
3. "Blue Jeans" (feat. Azealia Banks) (Smims & Belle remix)
4. "Blue Jeans" (Gesaffelstein remix)
5. "Blue Jeans" (Odd Future's the Internet mix)
6. "Blue Jeans" (Kris Menace remix)
7. "Blue Jeans" (Penguin Prison remix)
8. "Blue Jeans" (RAC mix)
9. "Blue Jeans" (Blood Orange remix)

Omid 16B remixes

1. "Blue Jeans" (Omid 16B remix)
2. "Blue Jeans" (Omid 16B dub)
3. "Blue Jeans" (Omid 16B club mix)
4. "Blue Jeans" (Omid 16B club reprise)
5. "Video Games" (Omid 16B remix)
6. "Video Games" (Omid 16B instrumental mix)
7. "Video Games" (Omid 16B instrumental)

== Credits and personnel ==
Credits adapted from the liner notes of "Blue Jeans"

- Songwriting – Lana Del Rey, Emile Haynie and Dan Heath
- Producing – Emile Haynie
- Strings arranging and conducting – Dan Heath
- Mixing – Dan Grech Marguerat
- Assistant mixing – Duncan Fuller

== Charts ==
Chart (2012–2013)	Peak position
Belgium (Ultratip Bubbling Under Flanders)	6
Belgium (Ultratip Bubbling Under Wallonia)	4
Brazil Hot 100 Airplay (Billboard)	94
Brazil Hot Pop Songs (Billboard)	60
Denmark (Tracklisten)	35
France (SNEP)	16
Greece Digital Singles (Billboard)	8
Israel International Airplay (Media Forest)	10
Italy (FIMI)	49
Spain Physical Singles (PROMUSICAE)	7
Switzerland (Schweizer Hitparade)	39
UK Singles (Official Charts)	32
US Rock Digital Songs (Billboard)	41

== Certifications ==
Region	Certification	Certified units/sales
Australia (ARIA)	2× Platinum	140,000^{‡}
Brazil (Pro-Música Brasil)	3× Platinum	180,000^{‡}
Canada (Music Canada)	Gold	40,000^{*}
Italy (FIMI)	Gold	15,000^{‡}
New Zealand (RMNZ)	Platinum	30,000^{‡}
United Kingdom (BPI)	Platinum	600,000^{‡}
United States (RIAA)	2× Platinum	2,000,000^{‡}
^{*} Sales figures based on certification alone.^{‡} Sales+streaming figures based on certification alone.

== Awards ==
Year	Awards ceremony	Award	Results	Ref
2012	UK Music Video Awards	Best Cinematography in a Video	Nominated	
2012	UK Music Video Awards	Best Pop Video – International	Nominated	

== Release history ==
Country	Date	Format	Label(s)	Ref.
Italy	March 30, 2012	Radio airplay	Universal Music Group	
Belgium	April 8, 2012	Digital download	Universal Music Group	
Finland	April 8, 2012	Digital download	Universal Music Group	
France	April 8, 2012	Digital download	Universal Music Group	
Netherlands	April 8, 2012	Digital download	Universal Music Group	
New Zealand	April 8, 2012	Digital download	Universal Music Group	
Portugal	April 8, 2012	Digital download	Universal Music Group	
Spain	April 8, 2012	Digital download	Universal Music Group	
Sweden	April 8, 2012	Digital download	Universal Music Group	
United Kingdom	April 8, 2012	Digital download	Universal Music Group	
United Kingdom	April 9, 2012	7-inch vinyl	Polydor	
Australia	May 1, 2012	Digital remixes EP	Interscope; Polydor	
Belgium	May 1, 2012	Digital remixes EP	Interscope; Polydor	
Brazil	May 1, 2012	Digital remixes EP	Interscope; Polydor	
Canada	May 1, 2012	Digital remixes EP	Interscope; Polydor	
Finland	May 1, 2012	Digital remixes EP	Interscope; Polydor	
France	May 1, 2012	Digital remixes EP	Interscope; Polydor	
Greece	May 1, 2012	Digital remixes EP	Interscope; Polydor	
Japan	May 1, 2012	Digital remixes EP	Interscope; Polydor	
Luxembourg	May 1, 2012	Digital remixes EP	Interscope; Polydor	
Netherlands	May 1, 2012	Digital remixes EP	Interscope; Polydor	
New Zealand	May 1, 2012	Digital remixes EP	Interscope; Polydor	
Portugal	May 1, 2012	Digital remixes EP	Interscope; Polydor	
Spain	May 1, 2012	Digital remixes EP	Interscope; Polydor	
Sweden	May 1, 2012	Digital remixes EP	Interscope; Polydor	
United States	May 1, 2012	Digital remixes EP	Interscope; Polydor	
United States	May 21, 2012	Adult album alternative	Interscope; Stranger	
France	July 23, 2012	CD single	Polydor	
