= Video Games (Lana Del Rey song) =

2011 single by Lana Del Rey

Single by Lana Del Rey

from the album Born to Die
- B-side: "Blue Jeans"; "Million Dollar Man"
- Released: May 5, 2011
- Studio: BMG Studios (New York, NY)
- Genre: Baroque pop; downtempo; dream pop
- Length: 4:42
- Label: Stranger; Interscope; Polydor; Vertigo
- Songwriters: Elizabeth Grant; Justin Parker
- Producer: Robopop

Lana Del Rey singles chronology
"Video Games" (2011)	"Born to Die" (2011)

Music video
- "Video Games" on YouTube

"Video Games" is the debut single by American singer-songwriter Lana Del Rey. The song was written by Del Rey and Justin Parker, and produced by Robopop. It was first released to the Internet on May 5, 2011, and was later released on her extended play, Lana Del Rey. The song was re-released as the lead single from her second studio album, Born to Die, on October 7, 2011, through Interscope Records. "Video Games" is a baroque pop, dream pop, and downtempo ballad.

"Video Games" has received widespread critical acclaim, with many critics praising the uniqueness of Del Rey's vocal performance and the song's cinematic production. The song is considered Del Rey's "breakthrough hit" and was a commercial success, peaking at number one in Germany, Iceland, and Luxembourg, and reaching the top ten in Austria, Belgium, Brazil, the Czech Republic, France, Ireland, the Netherlands, Poland, Switzerland, and the United Kingdom. It peaked at 91 on the Billboard Hot 100 and was certified 2× Platinum by the Recording Industry Association of America (RIAA). Its accompanying music video was directed and edited by Del Rey herself, combining scenes of her performing the song filmed on a webcam with clips of archive footage.

"Video Games" won an Ivor Novello Award for "Best Contemporary Song" in 2012 and was nominated for several other awards shortly after its release. The song was named "Song of the Decade" at the Q Awards 2019 and was ranked ninth on Pitchfork's 100 Best Songs of the 2010s.

== Recording and production ==
"Video Games" was written and composed by Del Rey and Justin Parker in the key of F♯ minor and was produced by Robopop (Daniel Omelio and Brandon Lowry) at BMG Studios in New York City. The demo version of the song included Del Rey's vocals accompanied by piano chords. The vocals and piano were re-recorded with Lowry. Omelio then took the re-recorded session and added all other instrumentation and layers, including strings, harps and synth arpeggios in one studio session, spanning from 8pm to 2am, stating "It was a kind of being in the zone thing. I locked myself in the room, switched off the lights and went full into it". Omelio mixed the song as he went along.

== Music and lyrics ==
"Video Games" (2011)
A 28-second sample of the song's final chorus featuring Del Rey using lower vocals over a background mixed with strings and harps

"Video Games" is four minutes and 42 seconds long (4:42). It blends together baroque pop, dream pop, and downtempo. Set in time signature of common time with a tempo of 123 beats per minute, Del Rey's vocal range spans from E_{3} to A_{4}. Alexis Petridis of The Guardian praised how Del Rey's vocal performance, against ballooning orchestration and pizzicato strings, overlapped the subdued theme of an aloof, beer-drinking boyfriend figure. Del Rey described her music and day-to-day style as "gangsta Nancy Sinatra", with contemporary critics noting the song as a doom-filled ballad that unapologetically displays vulnerability.

Prominent lyrics in the song include, "I heard you like the bad girls, honey, is that true?"; "Heaven is a place on earth with you/ Tell me all the things you want to do"; and "open up a beer... and play a video game?" In an interview for British online magazine The Quietus, Del Rey stated that the inspiration for the song came from her ex-boyfriend, commenting, "I think we came together because we were both outsiders. It was perfect. But I think with that contentment also comes sadness. There was something heavenly about that life – we'd go to work and he'd play his video games – but also it was maybe too regular." She said the video game referenced in the song was World of Warcraft.

The singer stated that she used lower vocals for "Video Games" because she felt that the public did not see her as a serious artist. Thematically, the lyrics have been labeled as antifeminist. Of the musical composition, MTV lauded the cinematic atmosphere of the song, adoring its feathery violins, echoing electronic thumps, and melancholic crescendos — wound into a dramatic exhibition.

== Critical reception ==
The song received widespread critical acclaim from music critics. Following its release, Ian Cohen dubbed the song "Best New Music" on Pitchfork commenting, "on her stirring debut single, New York singer-songwriter Lizzy Grant transforms into the more bombastically named Lana Del Rey and absolutely wallows in it." Digital Spy writer Robert Copsey noted Del Rey "combines a near-identical [Nancy Sinatra] vocal with her own fascination for the tragically glamorous — or 'Hollywood sadcore' as she succinctly labels it." Lindsey Johnstone of The Scotsman described the song as an "ode to being ignored and the exquisite pain of clutching at an illusion of happiness". Lewis Corner, also of Digital Spy, said, "New York-born, London-based Lana Del Rey is currently working on her debut album, but if this newly released preview track/video is anything to go by, it's going to be avant-garde pop at its very best." Alexis Petridis of The Guardian considered "Video Games" the best song of 2011 and added, "it's tempting to say with a song that good it doesn't matter who sings it, but that's not strictly true. As pop divas who collaborate with Eg White go, Lana Del Rey sounds hugely understated."

In a poll performed by NME, readers ranked it as the tenth best song of the year. Maura Johnston of The Village Voice, however, called the song and its accompanying music video overproduced, while New York magazine contributor Amanda Dobbis commented, "it's hard to totally separate Del Rey's looks from the criticism that's been bubbling around her." In responses to this controversy, Paste's Luke Larson said, "when 'Video Games' first hit the web, people weren’t freaking out about Lana Del Rey or fake lips or Lizzy Grant. People were freaking out because they had stumbled upon a fresh voice and a beautifully written song and ultimately, does the rest really matter?" Krystina Nellis of Drowned in Sound said the single reminded her of something from a David Lynch movie.

Additionally, Drowned in Sound wrote of "Video Games"

Above all the noise of the internet, "Video Games" still works and is magical; I still have to listen on quiet because whenever I do I become convinced something absolutely terrible is about to crash through the window; it might as well be sung by Laura Palmer and be about the Bobs at the end of your bed. Either way, it is a brilliant, beautifully-executed pop song, a proper shivery, proper classic.

NME named "Video Games" the best single of 2011. The Village Voice's Pazz & Jop annual critics' poll ranked "Video Games" as the seventh best song of 2011, tied with Britney Spears's "Till the World Ends".

In 2019, "Video Games" was named as one of the best songs of the 2010s decade in lists published by NME (third), Pitchfork (ninth), Uproxx (15th), Stereogum (26th), Consequence of Sound (36th), and GQ (unranked). At the 2019 Q Awards, the track was awarded "Song of the Decade".

=== Critics' lists ===
Publication	List	Rank	Ref.
Consequence of Sound	Top 100 Songs of the 2010s	36	
The Guardian	Best Song of 2011	1	
GQ	The 24 Songs That Shaped the Decade	–	
NME	500 Greatest Songs of All Time	87	
NME	100 Best Songs of the 2010s	3	
Pitchfork	The 200 Best Songs of the 2010s	9	
Uproxx	The Best Songs of the 2010s	15	

== Commercial performance ==
"Video Games" was Del Rey's breakthrough hit and first entry on worldwide singles charts. In an interview with T, Del Rey explained that record labels initially perceived the downbeat production of the song as a commercial risk, especially considering the pervasive popularity of electronic dance music at the time. Nonetheless, the song's radio success was described as "unprecedented," but also short-lived due to backlash against Del Rey's perceived inauthenticity by audiences. As of October 2016, "Video Games" has sold 2.6 million units worldwide.

In the United States, the song debuted at number 91 on the Billboard Hot 100 the week ending January 28, 2012. It also spent 18 weeks on the Adult Alternative Airplay chart, where it peaked at number fifteen. On November 24, 2021, it was certified 2× Platinum by the Recording Industry Association of America (RIAA) for sales and streaming figures equivalent to 2 million units.

"Video Games" experienced greater success in Europe, topping singles charts in Germany and Iceland, as well as the Luxembourg Digital Singles chart and the UK Indie chart. It reached number two in Austria, Belgium (both Flanders and Wallonia), Brazil, France, and Switzerland. It reached the top ten on singles charts in the Czech Republic, the Netherlands, Poland, Ireland, the United Kingdom, and Scotland. The song was voted number six in Triple J's Hottest 100 songs of 2011.

== Music video ==
The music video for "Video Games" was directed and edited by Del Rey. It features video clips of skateboarders, cartoons, and shots from old movies, as well as paparazzi footage of Paz de la Huerta falling down while intoxicated. These are interspersed with shots of Del Rey singing, which she filmed using a webcam. When asked if she would change anything about the video's production, Del Rey stated, "Had I known so many people were going to watch the video, I'd have put some more effort into it. I would have got my hair and make-up done and tried not to be so pouty, seeing as everyone talks about my face all the time. And I'd have put more of a storyline into it." The singer revealed that she was "trying to look smart and well turned-out, rather than 'sexy' [in the music video]. Of course I wanted to look good, but 'smart' was the primary focus."

New York magazine contributor Amanda Dobbins noted the music video "predictably [...] garnered some attention" from the public. Rya Backer of MTV questioned Del Rey's originality, saying, "it's hard to know what to make of Lana Del Rey at first glance. Is she as Jools Holland once dubbed her an 'Internet phenomenon' worth no more than a few salacious blog posts? Or is she a legitimate chanteuse wrapped in the hyper feminine, yet innately American (and admittedly well-curated) image she's projected in videos for such tracks as 'Video Games' and 'Blue Jeans'?" Pitchfork's Ian Cohen commented that the music video "fits between surrendering to romance and depression, moving with the elegant wastefulness of the kind of day drunk that's a true privilege of the beautiful, idle class."

Directed by Ben Coughlan, Del Rey filmed a second video for the song, titled "Video Games (Live At The Premises)". Uploaded to her official Vevo account on October 18, 2011, the video features Del Rey in jean shorts and a white T-shirt, singing into a microphone while barefoot, accompanied by a pianist. The Huffington Post wrote that the video was "loaded", indicating that the title was a contradiction and not a live performance. Additionally, they wrote: "we understand the takedowns of her hype (there is a lot of hype), but that doesn't change the fact that "Video Games"—the tune Lana's singing live this time—is one helluva song." Aside from criticizing her pillowy lips and long fingernails, The Guardian applauded Del Rey for amping up on the coquettish glances and hushed vocals as she devastatingly delivers the line, "I heard that you like the bad girls, honey, is that true?"

== Live performances, usage in other media, and legacy ==
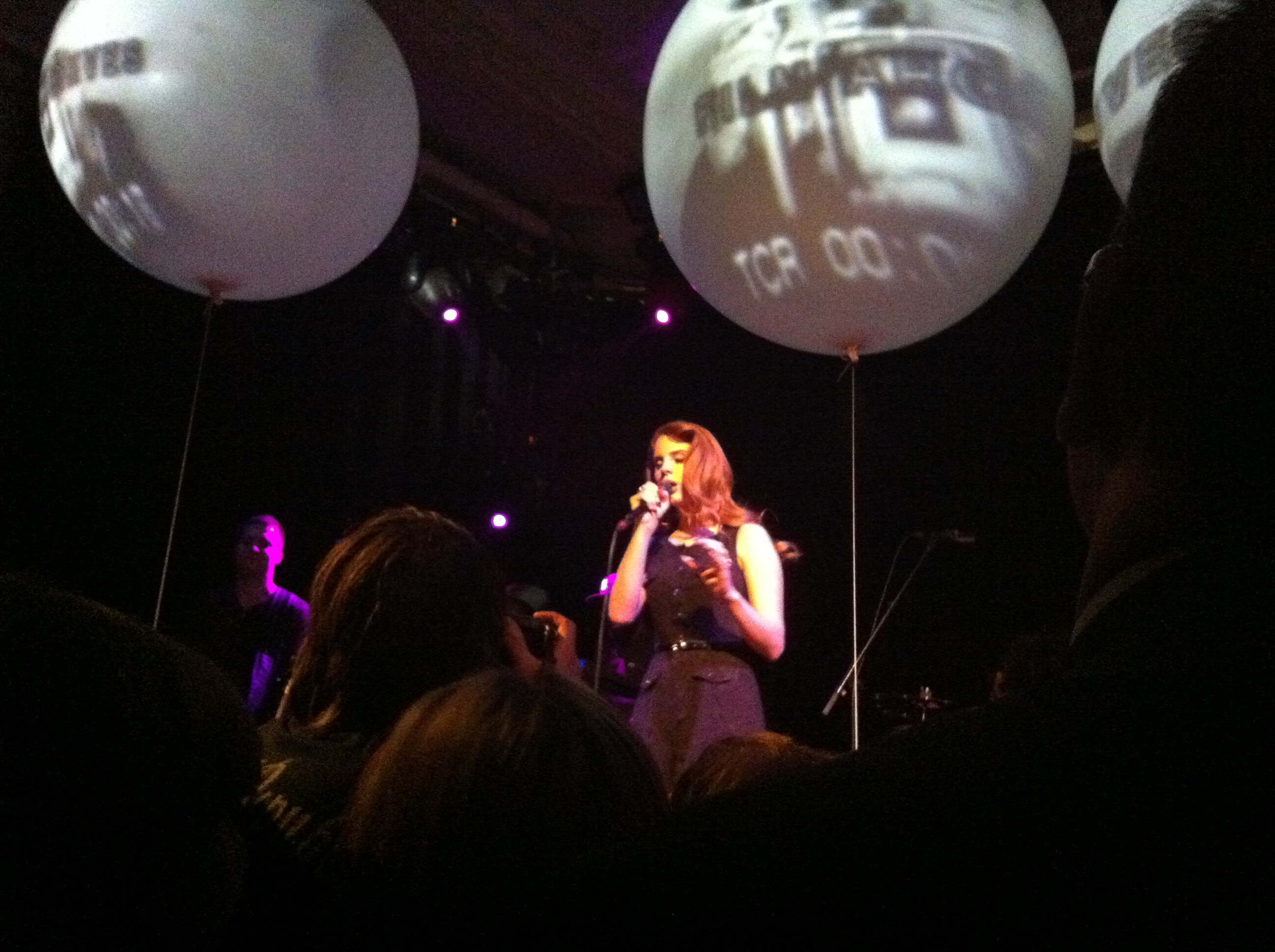
Del Rey performing "Video Games" during a concert held in Amsterdam in November 2011

"Video Games" was performed by Del Rey in a number of live appearances, including for MTV Push and at the Bowery Ballroom, where, according to Eliot Glazer of New York, "the polarizing indie hipstress brought her 'gangsta Nancy Sinatra' swag". Matthew Perpetua of Rolling Stone commented that, despite Del Rey being nervous and anxious while performing the song live, the singer "sang with considerable confidence, though her transitions from husky, come-hither sexuality to bratty, girlish petulance could be rather jarring". Del Rey also performed the song on Dutch television program De Wereld Draait Door, on British music television show Later... with Jools Holland, and in an intimate show at Chateau Marmont in Los Angeles, California. On January 14, 2012, Del Rey performed the song on Saturday Night Live (along with "Blue Jeans"). Her performance soon came under scrutiny and was even criticized by NBC anchor Brian Williams. Williams referred to the performance as "one of the worst outings in SNL history". Actor Daniel Radcliffe, who hosted the show the night Del Rey performed, quickly came to her defense, stating that criticism toward her was less about the performance and more about "her past and her family". On February 2, 2012, Del Rey performed the song on The Late Show With David Letterman where according to Rolling Stone she gave a "much more controlled and dramatic performance than on SNL." Del Rey performed "Video Games" live at ECHO Awards in Berlin, March 22, 2012.

"Video Games" has been covered by several artists, including Boy George, TYP, John Mayer (on guitar), Rasputina, Jay Jay Johanson, Bristeil (in the Belarusian language), Ben Howard, Maverick Sabre, Tyler Hilton, Amanda Palmer, Patrick Stickles of Titus Andronicus, Patrick Wolf, Tom Odell, Trixie Mattel, Tire le coyote (in French) and English rock bands Bombay Bicycle Club and Kasabian. The song was featured in the Ringer "If You Ever Want a French Lesson..." episode from its first season. It was also featured in the sixth episode of the fifth season of Gossip Girl. A remix of the song was featured in "The Dead Don't Stay Dead," an episode of 666 Park Avenue. On February 25, 2012, Masha covered "Video Games" on her popular YouTube channel.

A choral a cappella version of "Video Games" was used as part of the Royal Shakespeare Company's 2017 production of Othello in the Sam Wanamaker Playhouse, within Shakespeare's Globe, London. Used in place of Desdemona's "Weeping Willow" song, it was performed by live choir at various points in the production in an Elizabethan style, framing key moments of the play, as well as being used as the opening overture.

In 2022, an orchestral cover version of the song was played at the end of Westworld season 4 episode, "The Auguries", composed by Ramin Djawadi.

The song is featured at the end of the 6th episode of the Netflix series The 3 Body Problem.

== Formats and track listings ==
- CD single and 7" picture disc
1. "Video Games" (Radio Edit) – 4:01
2. "Blue Jeans" – 3:31
- Digital download 1
1. "Video Games" – 4:44
- Digital download 2
1. "Video Games" – 4:01
2. "Blue Jeans" – 3:31
- UK digital download
1. "Video Games" – 4:44
2. "Video Games" (Mr Fingers Remix) – 8:58
3. "Video Games" (Omid 16B Remix) – 5:14
- Digital EP
1. "Video Games" – 4:46
2. "Blue Jeans" – 3:34
3. "Video Games" (Mr. Fingers Remix) – 9:00
4. "Video Games" (Omid 16B Remix) – 5:14
- Remix EP
1. "Video Games" – 4:03
2. "Blue Jeans" – 3:33
3. "Video Games" (Club Clique for the Bad Girls Remix) – 4:59
4. "Video Games" (White Lies C-mix) – 7:33
5. "Video Games" (Mr. Fingers Heard Remix) – 9:00
6. "Video Games" (Helium Robots Remix) – 4:51
- Digital remix EP
1. "Video Games" (Club Clique for the Bad Girls Remix) – 4:57
2. "Video Games" (Jakwob and Etherwood Remix) – 3:42
3. "Video Games" (White Lies C-Mix) – 7:32
4. "Video Games" (Jamie Woon Remix) – 5:14
5. "Video Games" (We Don't Belong in Pacha Remix) – 5:19

== Charts ==
=== Weekly charts ===
Chart (2011–2012)	Peak position
Australia (ARIA)	23
Austria (Ö3 Austria Top 40)	2
Belgium (Ultratop 50 Flanders)	2
Belgium (Ultratop 50 Wallonia)	2
Brazil (Brasil Hot 100 Airplay)	2
Brazil (Brasil Hot Pop Songs)	3
Canada Hot 100 (Billboard)	72
CIS Airplay (TopHit)	198
Croatia International Airplay (HRT)	1
Czech Republic Airplay (ČNS IFPI)	3
Denmark (Tracklisten)	18
Finland (Suomen virallinen lista)	14
France (SNEP)	2
Germany (GfK)	1
Hungary (Editors' Choice Top 40)	40
Iceland (RÚV)	1
Ireland (IRMA)	6
Italy (FIMI)	27
Luxembourg Digital Songs (Billboard)	1
Japan Hot 100 (Billboard)	21
Netherlands (Dutch Top 40)	11
Netherlands (Single Top 100)	3
Poland Airplay (ZPAV)	5
Portugal Digital Songs (Billboard)	5
Scottish Singles Sales (Official Charts)	10
Spain (Promusicae)	33
Sweden (Sverigetopplistan)	56
Switzerland (Schweizer Hitparade)	2
UK Singles (Official Charts)	9
UK Indie (Official Charts)	1
US Billboard Hot 100	91
US Adult Alternative Airplay (Billboard)	15

=== Year-end charts ===
Chart (2011)	Position
Belgium (Ultratop 50 Flanders)	40
France (SNEP)	60
Germany (Official German Charts)	19
Netherlands (Dutch Top 40)	59
Netherlands (Single Top 100)	32
UK Singles (OCC)	111

Chart (2012)	Position
Austria (Ö3 Austria Top 40)	27
Belgium (Ultratop 50 Flanders)	15
Belgium (Ultratop 50 Wallonia)	16
Brazil (Crowley)	90
France (SNEP)	7
Germany (Official German Charts)	33
Switzerland (Schweizer Hitparade)	23
UK Singles (OCC)	87

== Certifications and sales ==
Region	Certification	Certified units/sales
Australia (ARIA)	5× Platinum	350,000^{‡}
Austria (IFPI Austria)	3× Platinum	90,000^{*}
Belgium (BRMA)	Platinum	30,000^{*}
Brazil (Pro-Música Brasil)	Diamond	250,000^{‡}
Canada (Music Canada)	Gold	40,000^{*}
Denmark (IFPI Danmark)	Platinum	90,000^{‡}
France	—	250,000
Germany (BVMI)	2× Platinum	600,000^{‡}
Italy (FIMI)	Platinum	100,000^{‡}
New Zealand (RMNZ)	3× Platinum	90,000^{‡}
Spain (Promusicae)	Gold	30,000^{‡}
Switzerland (IFPI Switzerland)	2× Platinum	60,000^{^}
United Kingdom (BPI)	3× Platinum	1,800,000^{‡}
United States (RIAA)	3× Platinum	3,000,000^{‡}
^{*} Sales figures based on certification alone.^{^} Shipments figures based on certification alone.^{‡} Sales+streaming figures based on certification alone.

== Release history ==
List of release dates, showing region, format(s), edition, label(s) and reference(s).
Region	Date	Format(s)	Edition	Label(s)	Ref.
Austria	October 7, 2011	Digital download; Streaming	A/B single (Note: Side B is "Blue Jeans".)	Vertigo	
Germany	October 7, 2011	Digital download; Streaming	A/B single	Vertigo	
Switzerland	October 7, 2011	Digital download; Streaming	A/B single	Vertigo	
Various (Note: Full list, according to the Spotify and Deezer APIs * Northern America: Mexico * Central America: Costa Rica, Guatemala, Honduras, Nicaragua, Panama & El Salvador * Caribbean: Dominican Republic * South America: Argentina, Bolivia, Brazil, Chile, Colombia, Ecuador, Peru, Paraguay & Venezuela * Western Europe: Belgium, France, Luxembourg, Netherlands * Northern Europe: Denmark, Estonia, Finland, Iceland, Lithuania, Latvia, Norway * Southern Europe: Bosnia and Herzegovina, Cyprus, Spain, Greece, Croatia, Italy, Montenegro, North Macedonia, Malta, Portugal, Serbia & Slovenia * Eastern Europe: Bulgaria, Czechia, Hungary, Poland, Romania, Slovakia, Ukraine, Kosovo & Russia * Western Africa: Burkina Faso, Benin, Cote D’Ivoire, Ghana, Gambia, Guinea, Guinea-Bissau, Liberia, Mali, Niger, Nigeria, Sierra Leone, Senegal & Togo * Eastern Africa: Burundi, Djibouti, Kenya, Comoros, Madagascar, Mauritius, Malawi, Mozambique, Rwanda, Seychelles, Tanzania, Uganda, Zambia, Zimbabwe, Eritrea, Somalia * Middle Africa: Angola, Democratic Republic of Congo, Congo, Cameroon, Gabon, Equatorial Guinea, Chad & Central African Republic * Southern Africa: Botswana, Lesotho, Namibia, Swaziland & South Africa * Western Asia: Israel & Turkey * Southern Asia: India & Sri Lanka * Eastern Asia: Hong Kong, Japan, South Korea, Macau, Taiwan * South-Eastern Asia: Brunei, Indonesia, Cambodia, Laos, Malaysia, Philippines, Singapore, Thailand & Vietnam * Oceania: Australia, Fiji & New Zealand)	October 16, 2011	Digital download; Streaming	A-side only	Interscope; Polydor	
Worldwide	October 16, 2011	Digital download; Streaming	Music video	Interscope; Polydor	
United Kingdom	October 17, 2011	7-inch single	A/B single (Note: Side B is "Blue Jeans".)	Stranger	
Austria	November 11, 2011	Compact disc	A/B single	Vertigo	
Germany	November 11, 2011	Compact disc	A/B single	Vertigo	
Switzerland	November 11, 2011	Compact disc	A/B single	Vertigo	
United States	November 25, 2011	Compact disc	A/B single	Interscope; Stranger	
Germany	December 12, 2011	Compact disc	Remix EP	Vertigo	
United States	2011	7-inch single	Joy Orbison remix / Odd Future's the Internet mix	Interscope	
Ireland	January 6, 2012	Digital download; Streaming	3 tracks (Note: Track 1: original mix; Track 2: Larry "Mr Fingers" Heard remix; Track 3: Omid 16B remix)	Interscope; Polydor	
United Kingdom	January 6, 2012	Digital download; Streaming	3 tracks	Interscope; Polydor	
United States	February 28, 2012	Digital download; Streaming	Remix EP	Interscope	
Germany	April 21, 2012	LP record	Remix EP	Vertigo	
Sweden	May 30, 2012	Digital download; Streaming	Bassflow remake	Polydor	
Sweden	June 16, 2012	Digital download; Streaming	Adrian Lux & Blende remix	Polydor	
Worldwide	December 24, 2012	Digital download; Streaming	Omid 16B remixes	Alola	
United Kingdom	December 24, 2012	LP record	Omid 16B remixes	Alola	
Various (Note: Released worldwide, excluding China.)	January 21, 2013	Digital download; Streaming	Omid 16B remixes	Alola	
