= Cedric Gervais discography =

This is the discography of French DJ Cedric Gervais. Gervais has released two studio albums, one extended play, and 20 singles since he started in 2001 (including one as a featured artist). As of September 2018, Gervais has had two songs go 4× platinum according to ARIA, one song go 2× platinum in the US, and one song go platinum in the UK.

Cedric's debut single “Burning” was released in 2001, through Ultra Records' sub label, You. Shortly after in 2003, he released his first commercial DJ mix, The House Sessions. His debut album, Experiment, was released in October, 2006. This featured his major hit "Spirit in My Life", which was a huge turning point in his career. As he grew more in demand as a remix producer, he still continued to release original material through his labels, Sleaze and Sleaze Industry. In 2011, he released his next album, "Miamication". Since then he has released numerous singles through various labels and outlets.

Gervais' single "Molly", released on 3 July 2012, became one of Cedric's most commercially successful songs to date, peaking at number five on the U.K. dance chart.

His remix of Lana Del Rey's "Summertime Sadness" released in July 2013, reached the Top Ten of the U.K., Australia, and U.S. charts and earned him a Grammy award for Best Remix on the following year.

== Studio albums ==
Title	Album details
Experiment	Released: 2006; Label: Ultra; Formats: CD, digital download
Miamication	Released: 22 March 2011; Label: Ultra; Formats: CD, digital download

== Extended plays ==
Title	Album details
The Experiment EP	Released: 2005; Label: You; Formats: CD, digital download

== Singles ==
=== As lead artist ===
List of singles as lead artist, with selected chart positions and certifications, showing year released and album name
Title	Year	Peak chart positions									Certifications	Album
Title	Year	FRA	AUS	BEL (FL)	CAN	NZ	SCO	UK	UK Dance	US	Certifications	Album
"Spirit in My Life"	2007	—	—	—	—	—	—	—	—	—		Experiment
"Mauri's Dream"	2009	—	—	—	—	—	—	—	—	—		Miamication
"Disclaimer"	2009	—	—	—	—	—	—	—	—	—		Miamication
"Leave Me Alone"	2010	—	—	—	—	—	—	—	34	—		Miamication
"Where Ever U Are" (featuring Jessica Sutta)	2011	—	—	—	—	—	—	—	—	—		Miamication
"Love Is the Answer" (with Mýa)	2011	—	—	—	—	—	—	—	—	—		Miamication
"Molly"	2012	—	—	81	—	—	18	26	5	—		Non-album singles
"Things Can Only Get Better" (with Howard Jones)	2013	—	—	—	—	—	—	—	—	—		Non-album singles
"Summertime Sadness (Remix)" (Lana Del Rey and Cedric Gervais)	2013	—	3	—	7	30	2	4	1	6	ARIA: 12× Platinum; RIAA: 2× Platinum; BPI: 3× Platinum	Non-album singles
"Young and Beautiful (Remix)" (Lana Del Rey and Cedric Gervais)	2013	—	—	—	—	38	—	—	—	—	ARIA: 10× Platinum	Non-album singles
"Adore You (Remix)" (Miley Cyrus vs. Cedric Gervais)	2014	—	25	19	36	15	21	27	—	21		Non-album singles
"Through the Night" (featuring Coco)	2014	—	—	—	—	—	—	—	—	—		Non-album singles
"Love Again" (featuring Ali Tamposi)	2014	—	—	—	—	—	—	—	—	—		Non-album singles
"With You" (featuring Jack Wilby)	2016	—	—	—	—	—	—	—	—	—		Non-album singles
"Would I Lie to You" (with David Guetta and Chris Willis)	2016	20	—	34	—	—	—	—	—	—		Non-album singles
"Touch The Sky" (featuring Digital Farm Animals and Dallas Austin)	2017	_	_	_	_	_	_	_				Non-album singles
"Somebody New" (featuring Liza Owen)	2017	—	—	—	—	—	—	—	—	—		Non-album singles
"Higher" (featuring Conrad Sewell)	2017	—	—	—	—	—	—	—	—	—		Non-album singles
"One Night" (featuring Wealth)	2018	—	—	—	—	—	—	—	—	—		Non-album singles
"Do It Tonight"	2018	—	—	—	—	—	—	—	—	—		Non-album singles
"Good Things" (with Just Kiddin featuring Kyan)	2019	—	—	—	—	—	—	—	—	—		Non-album singles
"Don't You Want"	2019	—	—	—	—	—	—	—	—	—		Non-album singles
"Take You In"	2019	—	—	—	—	—	—	—	—	—		Non-album singles
"Rock the Beat"	2019	—	—	—	—	—	—	—	—	—		Non-album singles
"Turn Your Love Around" (with Chris Willis)	2019	—	—	—	—	—	—	—	—	—		Non-album singles
"Get That Bag"	2019	—	—	—	—	—	—	—	—	—		Non-album singles
"Neo" (with Maggie Szabo)	2020	—	—	—	—	—	—	—	—	—		Non-album singles
"Everybody Dance" (with Franklin featuring Nile Rodgers)	2020	—	—	—	—	—	—	—	—	—		Non-album singles
"Playing Games" (with Tom Staar)	2021	—	—	—	—	—	—	—	—	—		Non-album singles
"Out of Time" (with Grace Gaustad)	2021	—	—	—	—	—	—	—	—	—		Non-album singles
"Shake That Ass"	2021	—	—	—	—	—	—	—	—	—		Non-album singles
"Molly" (with Joel Corry)	2022	—	—	—	—	—	—	—	—	—		
"We Are Family" (with Nile Rodgers)	2024	—	—	—	—	—	—	—	—	—		
"—" denotes a recording that did not chart or was not released in that territory.

=== As featured artist ===
List of singles as featured artist, with selected chart positions, showing year released and album name
Title	Year	Peak chart positions			Album
Title	Year	US	US R&B	US Rap	Album
"Molly" (Tyga featuring Cedric Gervais, Wiz Khalifa and Mally Mall)	2013	66	22	16	Hotel California

== Other songs ==
- 2001: Burning [Ultra Records]
- 2002: Talking About The Revolution (Cedric Gervais and Maurizio Ruggiero presents 440 Central) [Hydrogen Records]
- 2003: Let's Keep It Real (featuring Christy Prais) [Ultra Records]
- 2004: Chemical Reaction (Cedric Gervais and DJ Pedro presents French Sleaze) [Sleaze Industries]
- 2007: Spirit in My Life
- 2009: Experiment
- 2009: Mauri's Dream
- 2009: Miamication
- 2009: Disclaimer
- 2009: No Offense [Sleaze Industries]
- 2010: Leave Me Alone
- 2012: You Got The Look
- 2013: Deja Vu
- 2013: Flip [Toolroom Records]
- 2013: The Look
- 2013: Snowmass
- 2013: Put Em High [Spinnin']
- 2013: Deception (with Borgore) [Spinnin']
- 2013: Things Can Only Get Better (with Howard Jones) [3Beat / Spinnin']
- 2013: Never Come Close (with CID) [Spinnin']
- 2014: The Look [Spinnin']
- 2014: Hashtag
- 2015: De Ja Vu [Spinnin']
- 2016: With You (featuring Jack Wilby)
- 2016: Skin On Skin (featuring Luciana)
- 2016: Make Me Feel (with Willy Monfret)
- 2019: Run For Your Life (Remix) (Tiffany Young vs. Cedric Gervais) [Transparent Arts]

== DJ mixes ==
- 2003: The House Sessions [Sunswept Music]
- 2007: Yoshitoshi Miami [Yoshitoshi Recordings]
- 2008: Yoshitoshi Space Miami Terrace [Yoshitoshi Recordings]

== Remixes ==
- 2007: JdotP - 'Sid Bubble'
- 2011: BT - 'Le Nocturne De Lumiere'
- 2012: Katy Perry - 'Wide Awake'
- 2012: Borgore - 'Decisions'
- 2012: Willy Moon - 'Yeah Yeah'
- 2013: Dido - 'End of Night'
- 2013: Lana Del Rey - 'Summertime Sadness'
- 2013: Mish Mash - 'Speechless' (with A. Becks)
- 2013: Florence + the Machine - 'You Got The Love'
- 2013: Lana Del Rey - 'Young & Beautiful'
- 2014: Miley Cyrus - 'Adore You'
- 2015: Odesza featuring Zyra - 'Say My Name'
- 2016: Cedric Gervais - 'With You'
- 2016: Sigala featuring John Newman and Nile Rodgers - 'Give Me Your Love'
- 2016: Clean Bandit featuring Louisa Johnson - 'Tears'
- 2017: David Guetta featuring Nicki Minaj and Lil Wayne - Light My Body Up
- 2017: Sigrid - 'Don't Kill My Vibe'
- 2017: Cedric Gervais featuring Lisa Owen - 'Somebody New' (with Lauren Simeca)
- 2017: Madison Beer vs Cedric Gervais - 'Dead'
- 2017: J Balvin and Willy William - 'Mi Gente'
- 2017: Niall Horan - 'Too Much to Ask'
- 2017: Kelly Clarkson - 'Love So Soft'
- 2017: The Vamps - 'Personal'
- 2018: Cedric Gervais and Just Kiddin featuring Kyan - 'Good Things' (Disco Edit)
- 2019: DJ Snake, J. Balvin and Tyga - 'Loco Contigo'
- 2019: Au/Ra - 'Dance in the Dark'
- 2019: D.O.D - 'According to Me'
- 2019: Dope Lemon - 'Hey You'
- 2020: Alicia Keys - 'Time Machine'
- 2020: Cedric Gervais - 'Spirit In My Life' (2020 Edit)
- 2020: R Plus and Dido - 'Together'
- 2021: Pink - 'All I Know So Far'
