= Molly =

Molly or mollies may refer to:

== Animals ==
- Any of the fish in the Mollienesia subgenus, especially
  - Poecilia sphenops, short-finned molly
  - Poecilia latipinna, sailfin molly
  - Poecilia velifera, Yucatan molly
- Fancy molly, domestic hybrids of the above

== People ==
- Molly (name) or Mollie, a female given name, including a list of persons and characters with the name
- Molly (surname)

== Dance and theatre ==
- Molly (musical), a 1973 Broadway musical
- Molly dance, a form of English Morris dance

== Film and television ==
- Molly (1950 film), an American film based on The Goldbergs radio and television series
- Molly (1983 film), an Australian film by Ned Lander
- Molly (1999 film), an American film starring Elisabeth Shue
- Molly (2026 film), a British romantic drama film
- Molly: An American Girl on the Home Front, a 2006 made-for-television film
- Mike & Molly a 2010-2026 American television sitcom
- The Roads Not Taken (working title Molly), a 2020 American drama film by Sally Potter
- Molly (miniseries), a 2016 Australian miniseries

== Music ==
- "Molly" (Bobby Goldsboro song)
- "Molly" (Lil Pump song)
- "Molly" (Cedric Gervais song)
- "Molly" (Tyga song)
- "Molly (16 Candles Down the Drain)", a 1995 single by Sponge
- "Molly", a song by Mindless Self Indulgence from Tight
- "Molly", a song by Mike Oldfield from QE2
- "Molly", a song by Ween from the album The Pod
- The Mollys, an American band mixing Celtic folk and Tejano music
- Flogging Molly, an American Celtic punk band

== Places ==
- Aşağı Mollu, Azerbaijan, also called Molly
- Mollie, Indiana, an extinct American village
- Mollee, New South Wales, a parish in White County, New South Wales

== In street slang ==
- MDMA's crystallized form, a party drug
- Molotov cocktail, an improvised bottle-based incendiary weapon
- Molly house, a meeting place for gay men in 18th- and 19th-century England

== Other uses ==
- Molly (fastener), a type of wall anchor
- Molly (memoir), 2023, by Blake Butler
- Molly Maguires, a 19th-century Irish secret society
- MOLLE, modular lightweight load-carrying equipment
- Molly Mormon, a Mormon stereotype

== See also ==
- Moly (disambiguation)
- Mollie (disambiguation)
- Mali (disambiguation)
- Mallee (disambiguation)
- Mahle (disambiguation)
- Mollywood (disambiguation)
