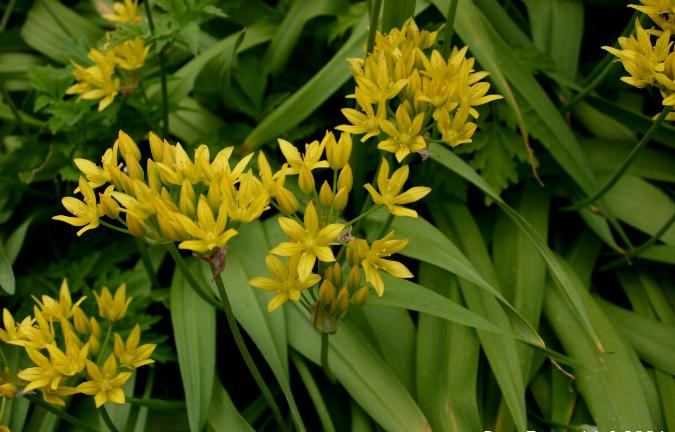
- Allium moly

Conservation status
- Least Concern (IUCN 3.1)

Scientific classification
- Kingdom: Plantae
- Clade: Tracheophytes
- Clade: Angiosperms
- Clade: Monocots
- Order: Asparagales
- Family: Amaryllidaceae
- Subfamily: Allioideae
- Genus: Allium
- Subgenus: A. subg. Amerallium
- Species: A. moly

Binomial name
- Allium moly L.

Synonyms
- Cepa moly (L.) Moench; Kalabotis moly (L.) Raf.; Molyza moly (L.) Salisb.; Nectaroscordum moly (L.) Galasso & Banfi; Allium aureum Lam.; Allium flavum Salisb.; Allium moly var. bulbilliferum Rouy

= Allium moly =

Species of flowering plant

Allium moly, also known as yellow garlic, golden garlic and lily leek, Is a species of flowering plant in the genus Allium, which also includes the flowering and culinary onions and garlic. A bulbous herbaceous perennial from the Mediterranean. It is edible and used as a medicinal and ornamental plant. Allium moly is a bulb type flower, with the size of the bulb affecting the flowering period and the time of the flowering.

== Description ==
With lance-shaped grey-green leaves up to 30 cm long, in early summer it produces masses of star-shaped bright yellow flowers in dense umbels. The cultivar 'Jeannine' has gained the Royal Horticultural Society's Award of Garden Merit. The leaves die in mid-summer. An onion-like fragrance is released when the leaves are crushed.

== Variants ==
formerly included

- Allium moly var. ambiguum, now called Allium roseum
- Allium moly subsp. massaessylum, now called Allium massaessylum
- Allium moly var. stamineum, now called Allium stamineum
- Allium moly var. xericiense, now called Allium scorzonerifolium

== Distribution ==
Allium moly is primarily found in Spain and Southern France with additional populations in Italy, Austria, Czech Republic, Algeria, and Morocco.

== Cultivation ==
It is recommended that Allium moly be planted in well-drained soil. Any soil can work, but sandy loams are best for this plant. Allium moly plants should have partial shade and some form of protection from the sun in the afternoons during hot summers. The bulbs should be placed about 5 inches deep and 2 to 3 inches apart. The size of the bulb affects the blooming period and the length of the bloom. Those that bloomed the earliest, around the 8th of June, were around 6-7 cm in circumference. these plants had the highest number of flowers produced, around 92.4% of the bulbs, and had the longest blooming period, around 2.5-3 weeks Those that bloomed the latest, bloomed around June 12th, had a flowering period of around 1.5 weeks, and were about 3-4 cm in circumference. On average of 8-20 days, the plants had a longer blooming period if they were sprayed with a 0.2% solution of Asahi SL than those with water. Things such as a higher number of inflorescence stems, the largest inflorescence diameter, along with the highest amount of flowers per inflorescence came from those with the smallest circumference of 6-7 cm. The flowering period in total is about 22-25 weeks of the year. The Allium moly has a mean scape length of 24.5 cm and a mean inflorescence diameter of 5.8 cm.

== Uses ==
The uses for Allium moly vary from medicinal to culinary. Allium moly, also known as yellow garlic, contains components that are found in other types of garlic, such as allicin. Antifungal activity and antibacterial properties are medicinal aspects that Allium moly possess as well. The bulb has a variety of uses in culinary works, and can be raw or cooked. When sliced, there is a mild garlic flavor. These slices can be cooked into dishes for flavoring or added to salads raw. The leaves of this plant can also be eaten raw or cooked with similar uses as the bulb. As opposed to the leaves and the bulb, the flowers can only be eaten raw.

Allium moly has several different types of health benefits when eaten. This is due to the antioxidants and bioactive compound contained in the vegetable. These benefits can change depending on the preparation method used. Crushing the garlic has a positive effect on the bioactive components. There are many ways that the bioactive of the vegetable are lost. Bioaccessibility of the bioactive components found in Allium moly increased with heat and the release of phenolic compounds. Soaking the vegetable in water causes the bioactive compounds to transfer into the water. This can be prevented by using little water and using the vegetable's own water to cook it. The water that was used, should not be poured out as a result of this transfer. Baking, grilling, and frying the vegetables is the best way to reserve the phenolic compounds and the bioavailability.

== See also ==
- Moly (herb), mentioned in The Odyssey, from which Linnaeus took the species' name
