= Moly =

Moly may refer to:

- Moly (herb), a magic herb in Greek mythology
- Allium moly, a flowering plant
- Molybdenum (Mo), a chemical element
- Molybdenum disulfide (MoS_{2}), referred to as "moly" when used as a dry lubricant, or added to grease or oil

== See also ==
- Chromoly, a steel chromium and molybdenum alloy
- Moli (disambiguation)
- Molly (disambiguation)
