= Moli =

Moli may refer to:

== People ==
- Atu Moli (born 1995), New Zealand rugby player
- Fabio Moli (born 1969), Argentinian boxer
- Jacob Moli (born 1967), Solomon Islands football player
- Josias Moli (born 1954), Vanuatuan politician
- Liaki Moli (born 1990), New Zealand-born Japanese rugby player
- Malietoa Moli (c. 1790–1860), Samoan king
- Moli Duru Ambae (born 1968), Australian politician
- Moli Lesesa (born 1984), Lesotho football player
- Sam Moli (born 1998), New Zealand rugby player

=== Fictional characters ===
- Moli (姆力), a character in the Taiwanese television series Port of Lies (八尺門的辯護人).

== Places ==
- Moli, Nepal

== Other ==
- E-One Moli Energy
- Ministry of Agriculture and Irrigation (Myanmar)
- Moli language (disambiguation)
- Museum of Literature Ireland

== See also ==
- Moly (disambiguation)
- Molly (disambiguation)
