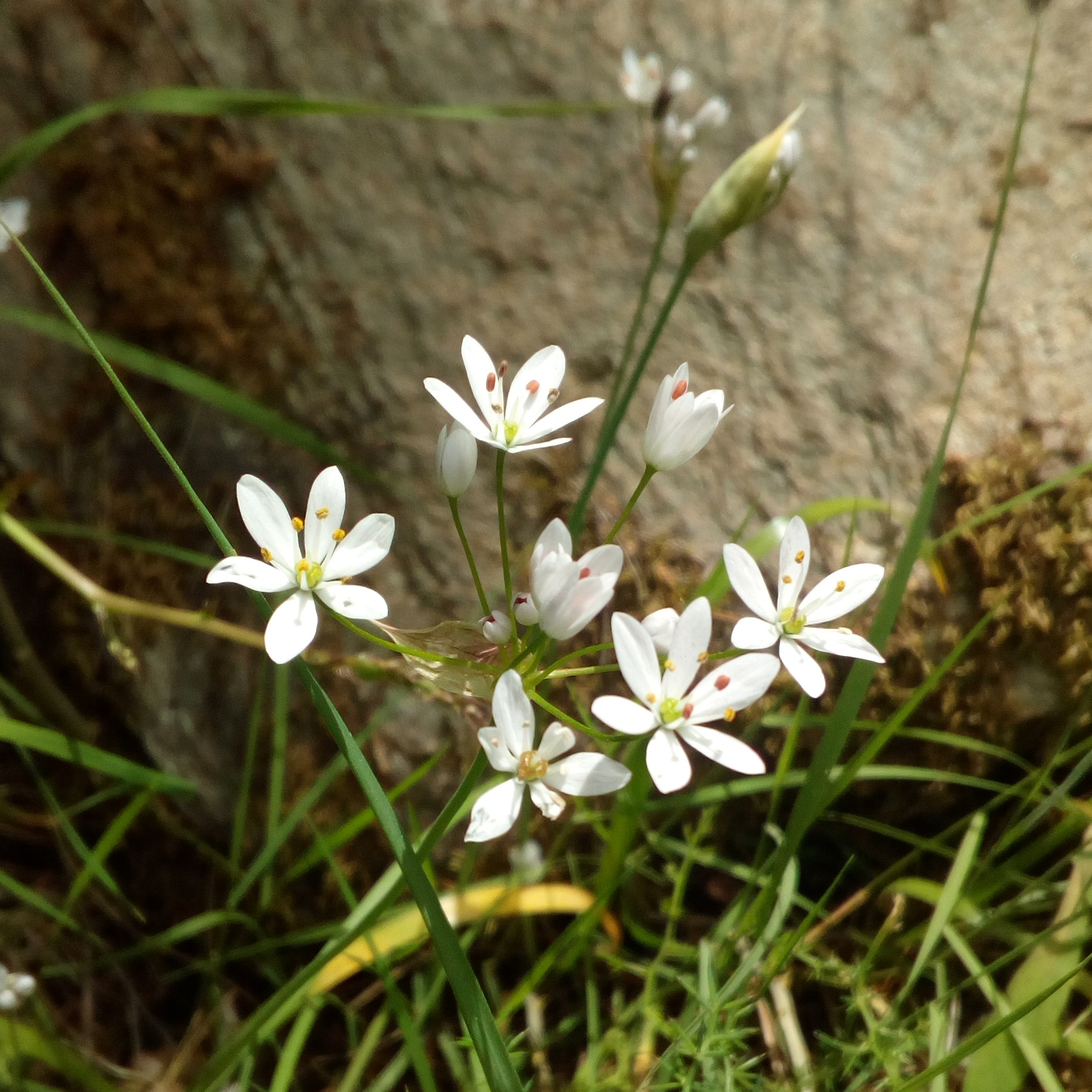

Scientific classification
- Kingdom: Plantae
- Clade: Tracheophytes
- Clade: Angiosperms
- Clade: Monocots
- Order: Asparagales
- Family: Amaryllidaceae
- Subfamily: Allioideae
- Genus: Allium
- Subgenus: A. subg. Amerallium
- Species: A. subhirsutum

Binomial name
- Allium subhirsutum L.

Synonyms
- Species synonymy: Allium album F.Delaroche; Allium brachystemon Redouté; Allium ciliare F.Delaroche; Allium ciliatum Cirillo; Allium clusianum Retz. ex Willd.; Allium graminifolium Loisel. 1806, illegitimate homonym not Pers. 1805; Allium graminifolium Buch 1816, illegitimate homonym not Pers. 1805; Allium hirsutum Lam. 1779, illegitimate superfluous name; Allium hirsutum Zucc. 1843, illegitimate homonym not Lam. 1779; Allium loiseleurii (Rouy) D.Prain; Allium niveum Roth; Allium subhirsutum subsp. ciliare (F.Delaroche) Maire & Weiller; Allium subhirsutum var. ciliatum (Cirillo) Briq.; Allium subhirsutum subsp. ciliatum (Cirillo) Holmboe; Allium subhirsutum var. corbariense Timb.-Lagr. ex Nyman; Allium subhirsutum var. hellenicum Hausskn.; Allium subvillosum var. clusianum (Retz. ex Willd.) Nyman; Allium tinei C.Presl; Iulus niveum (Roth) Salisb.; Iulus subhirsutum (L.) Salisb.; Kalabotis clusianum (Retz. ex Willd.) Raf.

= Allium subhirsutum =

Hairy garlic

Species of flowering plant

Allium subhirsutum, the hairy garlic, is a plant species widespread around the Mediterranean region from Spain and the Canary Islands to Turkey and Palestine.

Allium subhirsutum is a perennial herb up to 50 cm tall. Leaves are long, up to 15 mm across, tapering toward the tip, with hairs along the margins (hence the name "hairy garlic"). The umbel contains only a few flowers, white with thin pink midveins.

== Uses ==
Allium subhirsutum is edible and sometimes cultivated in kitchen gardens. Bulbs can be eaten cooked or in salads. There are however a few reports of toxicity when consumed in large quantities.

Subspecies

1. Allium subhirsutum subsp. obtusitepalum (Svent.) G.Kunkel - Alegranza Island in Canary Islands
2. Allium subhirsutum subsp. subhirsutum - from Spain and Morocco to Turkey and Palestine.

formerly included

- Allium subhirsutum var. barcense, now called Allium longanum
- Allium subhirsutum var. canariense, now called Allium subvillosum
- Allium subhirsutum var. glabrum now called Allium neapolitanum
- Allium subhirsutum subsp. graecum, now called Allium trifoliatum
- Allium subhirsutum var. hirsutum, now called Allium trifoliatum
- Allium subhirsutum subsp. permixtum, now called Allium permixtum
- Allium subhirsutum var. purpurascens, now called Allium subvillosum
- Allium subhirsutum subsp. spathaceum, now called Allium spathaceum
- Allium subhirsutum subsp. subvillosum, now called Allium subvillosum
- Allium subhirsutum subsp. trifoliatum, now called Allium trifoliatum
- Allium subhirsutum var. vernale, now called Allium subvillosum
