= Mollie =

Mollie may refer to:

- Mollie (given name), female given name
- Mollie, Indiana, an extinct American village in Blackford County, Indiana, United States of America
- Mollie Stone's Markets, chain of supermarkets, located in the San Francisco Bay Area, United States of America
- Mollie's Nipple, the name given to as many as seven peaks and some other geological features in Utah, United States of America

== See also ==
- Molly (disambiguation)
- Mollia
