= Mahli (disambiguation) =

Mahali or Mahli may refer to:

- Mahli, tribe in India
- Mahali (biblical figure), an individual mentioned in the Hebrew Bible
- Mars Hand Lens Imager (MAHLI), a type of camera on the Curiosity rover on the Mars Science Laboratory mission

== See also ==
- Mahle (disambiguation)
- Mali (disambiguation)
