= Love Again (Cedric Gervais song) =

Single by Cedric Gervais featuring Ali Tamposi
- Released: 13 October 2014
- Genre: Progressive house
- Length: 3:47
- Label: Polydor; Interscope
- Songwriters: Jef Martens, Carlos Cid, Cedric Gervais, Daniel Omelio, Ali Tamposi
- Producers: Cedric Gervais; Carlos Cid; Jef Martens; Daniel Omelio; Ali Tamposi

Cedric Gervais singles chronology
"Through the Night" (2014)	"Love Again" (2014)	"Missing You" (2014)

Ali Tamposi singles chronology
"Love Again" (2014)

Love Again is a song by French producer and recording artist Cedric Gervais. It was written and recorded by American singer-songwriter Ali Tamposi and was co-produced by Gervais, Jared Shelton, Tommy Dingwall and Alexa Dedlow. The song first received a radio airplay premiere on SiriusXM's BPM on 9 October 2014. The song was released on 13 October 2014 to digital retailers in Canada and on 14 October 2014 in the United States via Interscope Records. A video supporting the song was also released on 14 October 2014.

This song followed Gervais' success with Lana Del Rey's Summertime Sadness remix. It was his first song under his contract with Interscope. The music video supporting the song, premiered on vevo on 24 November 2014.

Ali Tamposi suggested during interviews that the song describes a toxic love relationship, and that possibly a heartbreak can pull a relationship back together.

== Background and release ==
After the success of Summertime Sadness, recorded by US singer Lana Del Rey, Gervais signed to Interscope Records and its sister label Polydor (UK), who both also released Summertime Sadness. Written and recorded by Ali Tamposi, the song was co-produced by Gervais, Carlos Cid, Jef Martens and Daniel Omelio.

The song was released on worldwide digital retailers on 14 October 2014. Promoting the song, an audio video uploaded by Interscope was released on 15 October 2014. On 24 November 2014, an extended version of the song was released on Beatport via Polydor (UK). On 9 October 2014, the song premiered on SiriusXM's BPM which was solicited by Interscope. In an interview on Y100 Miami, Gervais said he would perform Love Again live at the Electric Daisy Carnival in Miami, Florida (15 June 2014). He also performed Summertime Sadness at the Carnival. During an interview with Y100 Miami, Gervais explained about the record: "This is the first single off of my deal with Interscope Records which I'm very excited about [...] to be part of the team, [i]t's a great label and [...] it's featuring Ali Tamposi [...] she's an amazing song-writer."

On the set of the music video, Tamposi explained the background and meaning of the song: "I wrote this song in ... one of those dark moments in a relationship with someone with somebody that I felt that would ... bring us, jolt us back together, it's a sensitive subject." She explained the concept of the video in the "Making of" video uploaded by Interscope Records, saying that she had the dream of the music video, seeing herself as a little child. Gervais also discussed his production of the song: “When I produce a song, the first thing that I look for is obviously the lyrics and meaning of the song, but what I was taken by was Ali’s voice in the song. I felt the song the first time I heard it… the lyrics, her voice, everything was just on point.” On 1 January 2015, the song was released in various countries worldwide via Polydor (its Australian release was on 23 January 2015). In Italy, the song was sent to Mainstream radio on 14 November 2014.

== Critical reception ==
"Love Again" was praised by music critics. Andrew Spada of Dancing Astronaut was positive upon the song and praised Tamposi's vocals: "A triumphant return to original production duties, Love Again sees Gervais firing on all production cylinders, delivering a rousing peak time effort that will quickly leave its mark on the global nightlife scene." Chris Caruso of DJ Times gave a positive review, praising Tamposi's vocals and the music video: "Ali Tamposi delivers huge vocals and emotive lyrics for the radio-ready track, and the video—directed by ENDS—aims to convey the track’s drama with black-and-white visuals paired with striking visual effects."

== Music video ==
Tamposi in the music video

A music video provided for the song premiered on Vevo on 24 November 2014 by Interscope Geffen A&M. It was directed by Ends and was filmed in black and white. Discussing the music video, Gervais said “We wanted to create something a little different, with a story for the video inspired by Ali’s lyrics, and I think we’ve created a truly stunning visual piece.” Tamposi said: "The concept was driven by, as strange as it sounds, a dream that I had about a year ago of just seeing myself as a little child at a beauty pageant. And so I … really brought it to life by just bringing the pain and throwing the objects and just really building upon the original concept.”

=== Content and synopsis ===
The video begins with both Tamposi and Gervais sitting still, in different rooms, one white and one black. There are two children in both rooms, playing with paint and smashing it on the wall, and later seen dancing randomly. In the middle of the video are people dancing to the song and at the same time throwing paint at each other. At the end of the video, Gervais and Tamposi walk toward each other.

=== Credits ===
- Label — Interscope, Polydor
- Production Company — More Media
- Director of Photography — Dannel Escallon
- Editor — Anthony Chirco
- Executive Producer — Jared Shelton
- Commissioner — Alexa Dedlow

== Track listing ==
Digital download

1. "Love Again" – 3:47

Beatport exclusive

1. "Love Again" (Extended Version) - 6:31

Eat More Cake & Sharam After Hours Remixes

1. "Love Again" (Eat More Cake Remix) - 6:21
2. "Love Again" (Sharam Acid House Remix) - 7:38

Digital download - Acoustic

1. "Love Again" (Acoustic) - 3:42

== Charts ==
Chart (2014)	Peak position
US Hot Dance/Electronic Songs (Billboard)	26

== Release history ==
Country/Region	Date	Format	Label	Catalogue no.
North America	9 October 2014	Radio airplay (premiere)	Interscope	None
Canada	13 October 2014	Digital download	Interscope	None
United States	14 October 2014	Digital download	Interscope	B00O6YZ6JQ (ASIN)
North America	24 November 2014	Digital download (Beatport exclusive mix)	Polydor	00602547103789
Austria	1 January 2015	Digital download	Polydor, Interscope, UMG Recordings	None
Belgium	1 January 2015	Digital download	Polydor, Interscope, UMG Recordings	None
Czech Republic	1 January 2015	Digital download	Polydor, Interscope, UMG Recordings	None
Germany	1 January 2015	Digital download	Polydor, Interscope, UMG Recordings	None
Italy	11 November 2014	Mainstream radio	Interscope	None
Japan	1 January 2015	Digital download	Polydor, Interscope, UMG Recordings	None
Netherlands	1 January 2015	Digital download	Polydor, Interscope, UMG Recordings	None
Philippines	1 January 2015	Digital download	Polydor, Interscope, UMG Recordings	None
Russia	1 January 2015	Digital download	Polydor, Interscope, UMG Recordings	None
Switzerland	1 January 2015	Digital download	Polydor, Interscope, UMG Recordings	None
South Africa	1 January 2015	Digital download	Polydor, Interscope, UMG Recordings	None
Spain	1 January 2015	Digital download	Polydor, Interscope, UMG Recordings	None
Sweden	1 January 2015	Digital download	Polydor, Interscope, Universal Music Sweden	None
Thailand	1 January 2015	Digital download	Interscope, Universal Music Thailand	None
Venezuela	1 January 2015	Digital download	Polydor, Interscope, UMG Recordings	None
Australia	23 January 2015	Digital download	Hussle Recordings, Polydor, Interscope	None
