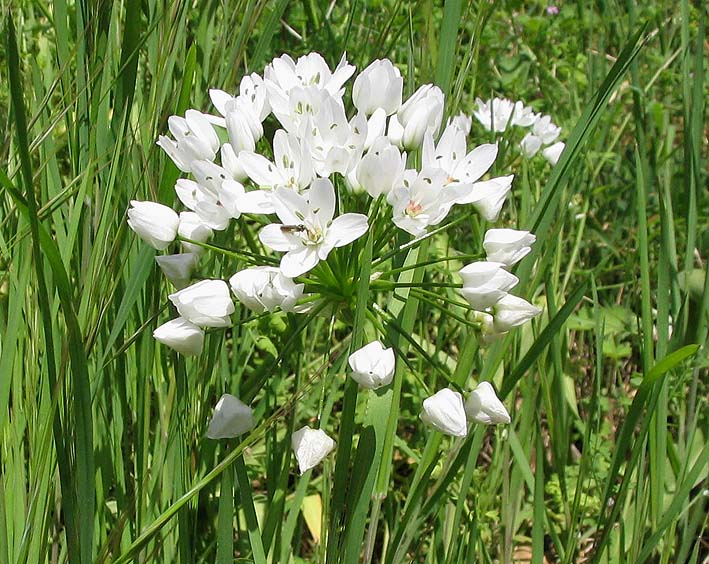

Scientific classification
- Kingdom: Plantae
- Clade: Embryophytes
- Clade: Tracheophytes
- Clade: Spermatophytes
- Clade: Angiosperms
- Clade: Monocots
- Order: Asparagales
- Family: Amaryllidaceae
- Subfamily: Allioideae
- Genus: Allium
- Subgenus: A. subg. Amerallium
- Species: A. neapolitanum

Binomial name
- Allium neapolitanum Cirillo

Synonyms
- Synonyms list: Allium album Santi; Allium amblyopetalum Link; Allium candidissimum Cav.; Allium candidum C.Presl; Allium cowanii Lindl.; Allium gouanii G.Don; Allium inodorum Aiton; Allium lacteum Sm.; Allium laetum Pollini; Allium liliflorum Zeyh.; Allium neapolitanum var. angustifolium Täckh. & Drar; Allium sieberianum Schult. & Schult.f.; Allium subhirsutum Sieber ex Kunth; Allium subhirsutum Delile ex Boiss.; Allium subhirsutum subsp. album (Santi) Maire & Weiller; Allium subhirsutum var. glabrum Regel; Allium sulcatum DC.; Geboscon inodorum (Aiton) Thell.; Nothoscordum inodorum (Aiton) G. Nicholson

= Allium neapolitanum =

Species of plant

Allium neapolitanum is a bulbous herbaceous perennial plant in the onion subfamily within the Amaryllis family. Common names include Neapolitan garlic, Naples garlic, daffodil garlic, false garlic, flowering onion, Naples onion, Guernsey star-of-Bethlehem, star, white garlic, and wood garlic.

== Description ==
Allium neapolitanum produces round bulbs up to 2 cm (3/4 in) across. The scape is up to 25 cm (10 in) tall, round in cross-section but sometimes with wings toward the bottom. The inflorescence is an umbel of up to 25 white flowers with yellow anthers.

Allium neapolitanum seems to have beta-adrenergic antagonist properties.

== Distribution and habitat ==
Its native range extends across the Mediterranean Region from Portugal to the Levant. The species is cultivated as an ornamental and has become naturalized in many areas, including Pakistan, Australia, New Zealand, and in southern and western parts of the United States. It is classed as an invasive species in parts of the U.S., and is found primarily in the states of California, Texas, Louisiana, and Florida.

== Gallery ==
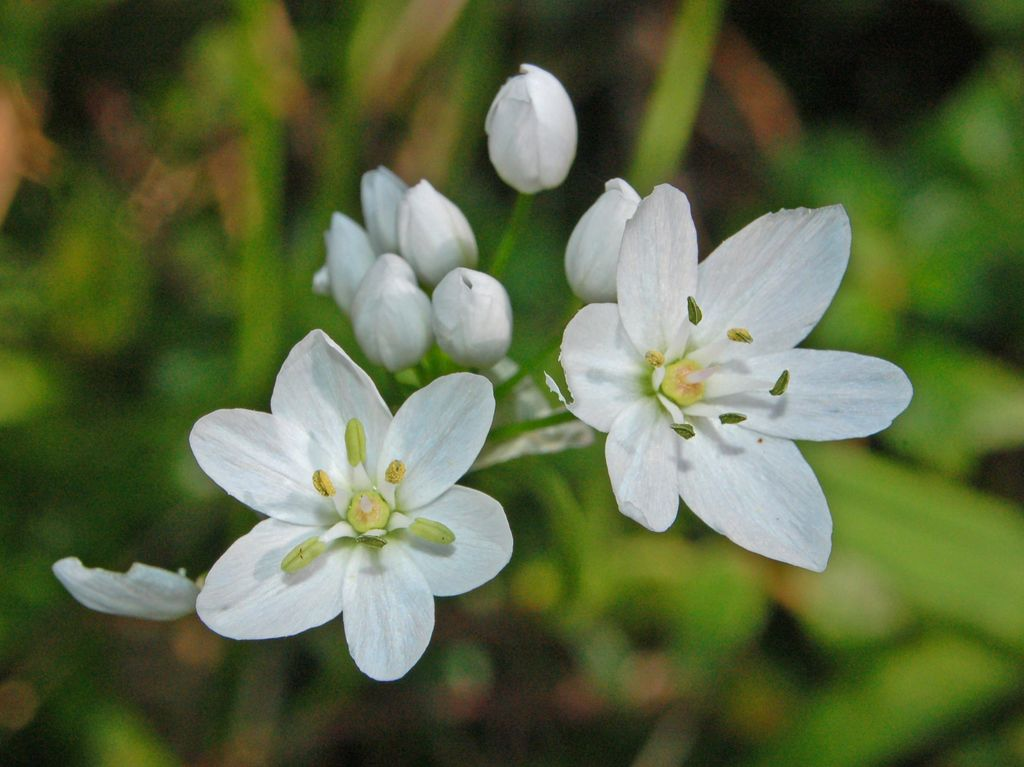
Flower closeup

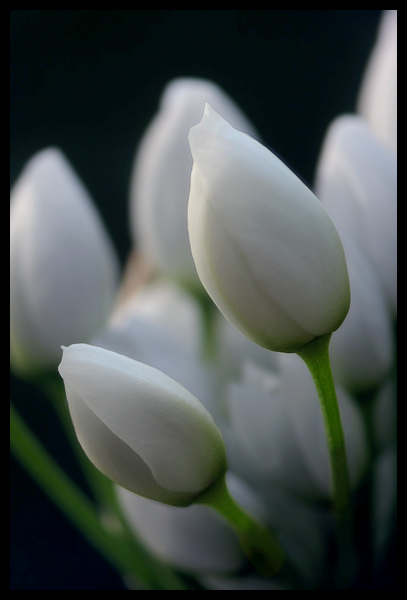
Flower closeup

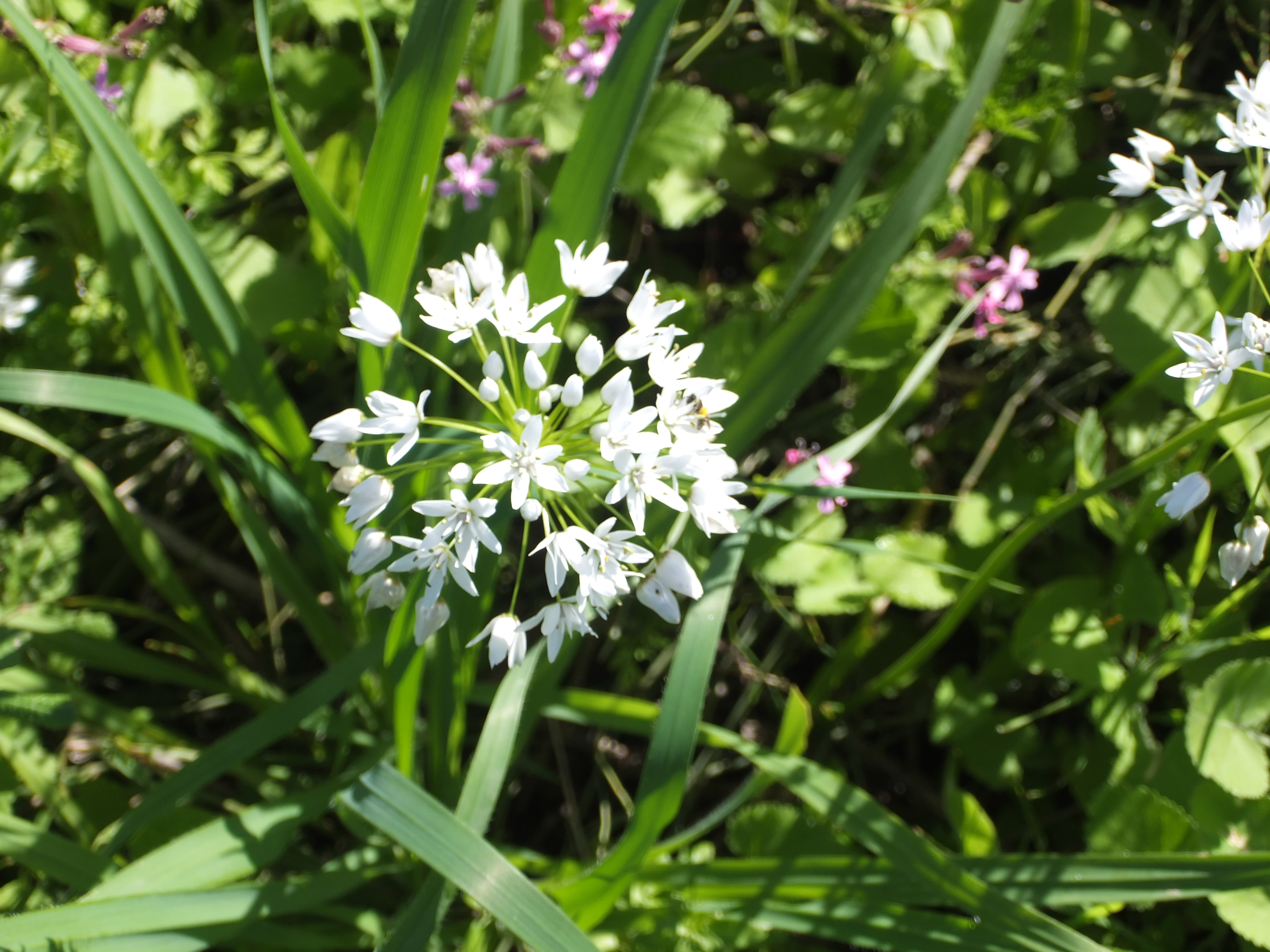

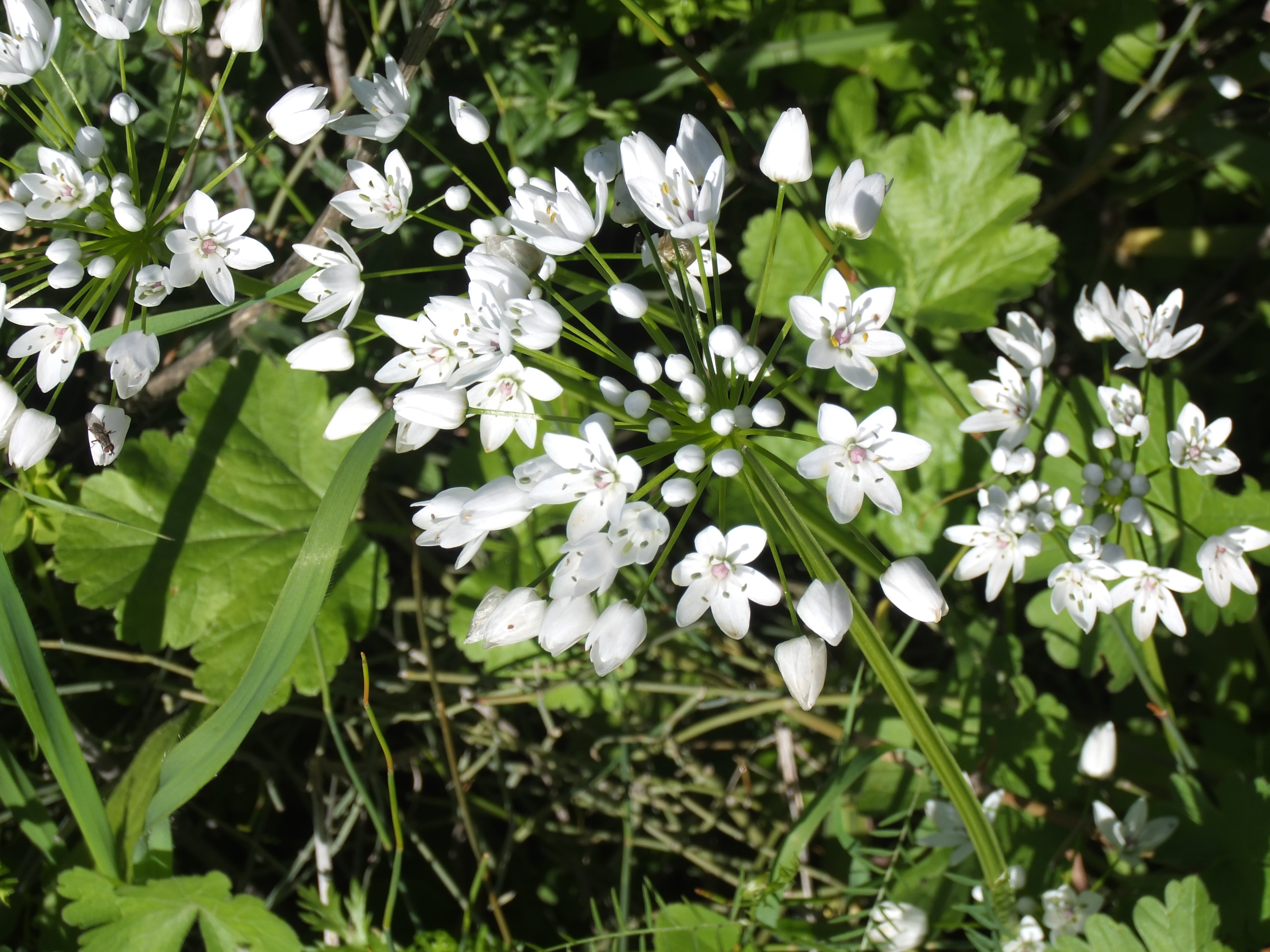
In early spring
