= Molly (surname) =

Molly is a surname. Notable people with the surname include:

- Kenny Molly (born 1996), Belgian cyclist
- Marion Henriëtte Louise Molly (born 1933), Dutch singer and actress of Surinamese origin
- Wilhelm Molly (1838–1919), doctor, philatelist, activist, and Esperantist

== See also ==
- Molly (name)
- Molly (disambiguation)
