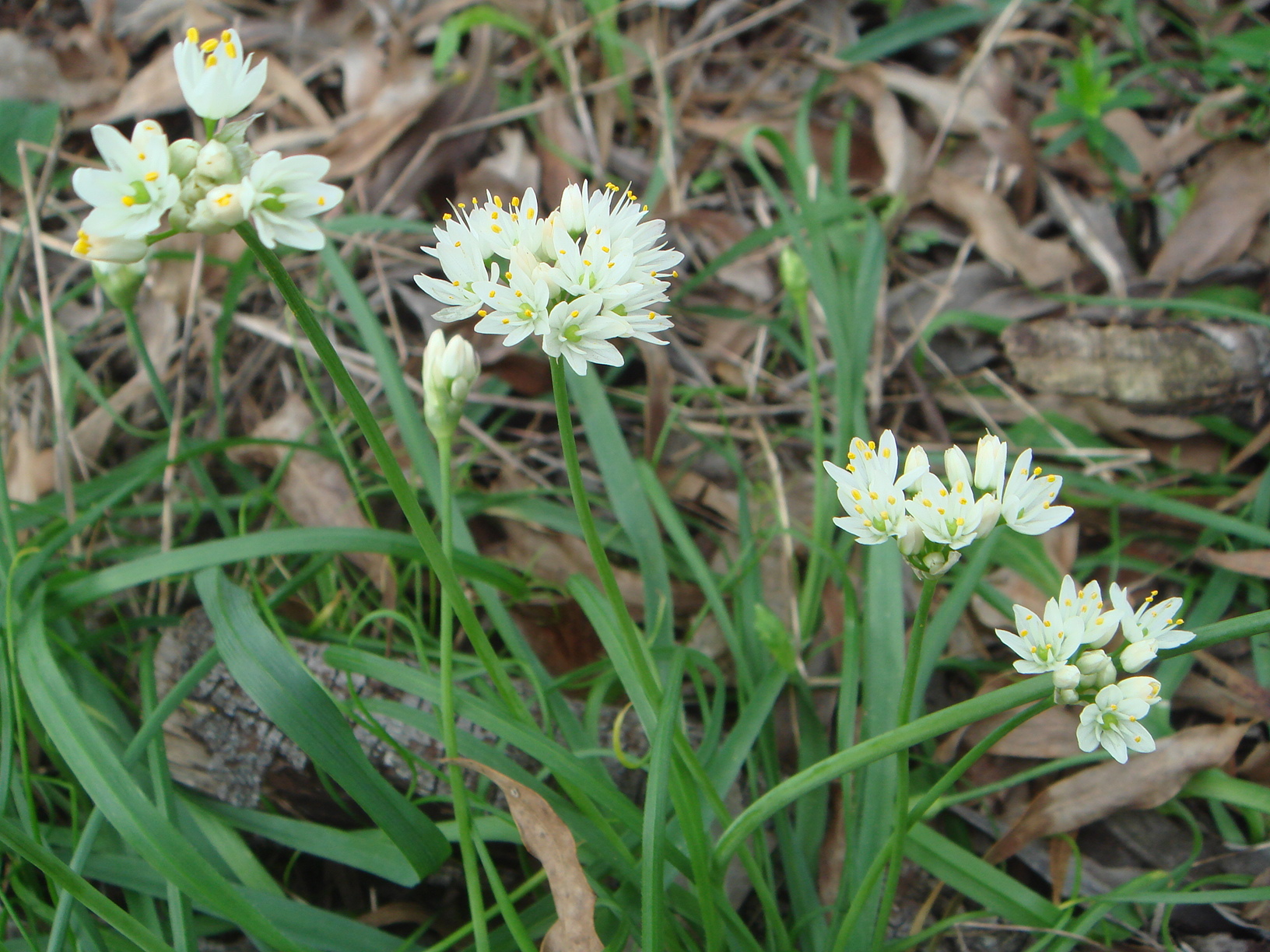

Scientific classification
- Kingdom: Plantae
- Clade: Tracheophytes
- Clade: Angiosperms
- Clade: Monocots
- Order: Asparagales
- Family: Amaryllidaceae
- Subfamily: Allioideae
- Genus: Allium
- Species: A. subvillosum

Binomial name
- Allium subvillosum Salzm. ex Schult. & Schult. f.

Synonyms
- Species synonymy: Allium album var. purpurascens Maire & Weiller; Allium chamaemoly Viv. 1824, illegitimate homonym not L. 1753; Allium humbertii Maire; Allium subhirsutum Desf.; Allium subhirsutum Rchb.; Allium subhirsutum var. canariense Regel; Allium subhirsutum f. purpurascens (Maire & Weiller) Vindt; Allium subhirsutum var. purpurascens (Maire & Weiller) Maire & Weiller; Allium subhirsutum var. subvillosum (Salzm. ex Schult. & Schult.f.) Ball; Allium subhirsutum subsp. subvillosum (Salzm. ex Schult. & Schult.f.) Duyfjes; Allium subhirsutum var. vernale (Tineo) Bonnet & Barratte; Allium vernale Tineo

= Allium subvillosum =

Spring garlic

Species of flowering plant

Allium subvillosum, the spring garlic, is a European and North African species of wild onion native to southern Iberia, the Balearic Islands, Sicily, northern Africa (Libya, Tunisia, Algeria, Morocco, and the Azores where it might be introduced.

Allium subvillosum is a bulb-forming perennial up to 30 cm tall. Leaves are long and narrow, with long white hairs clearly visible to the naked eye. Umbel is hemispherical, with 15-20 flowers on long pedicels. Flowers are white with yellow anthers.

formerly included

Allium subvillosum var. clusianum, now called Allium subhirsutum
