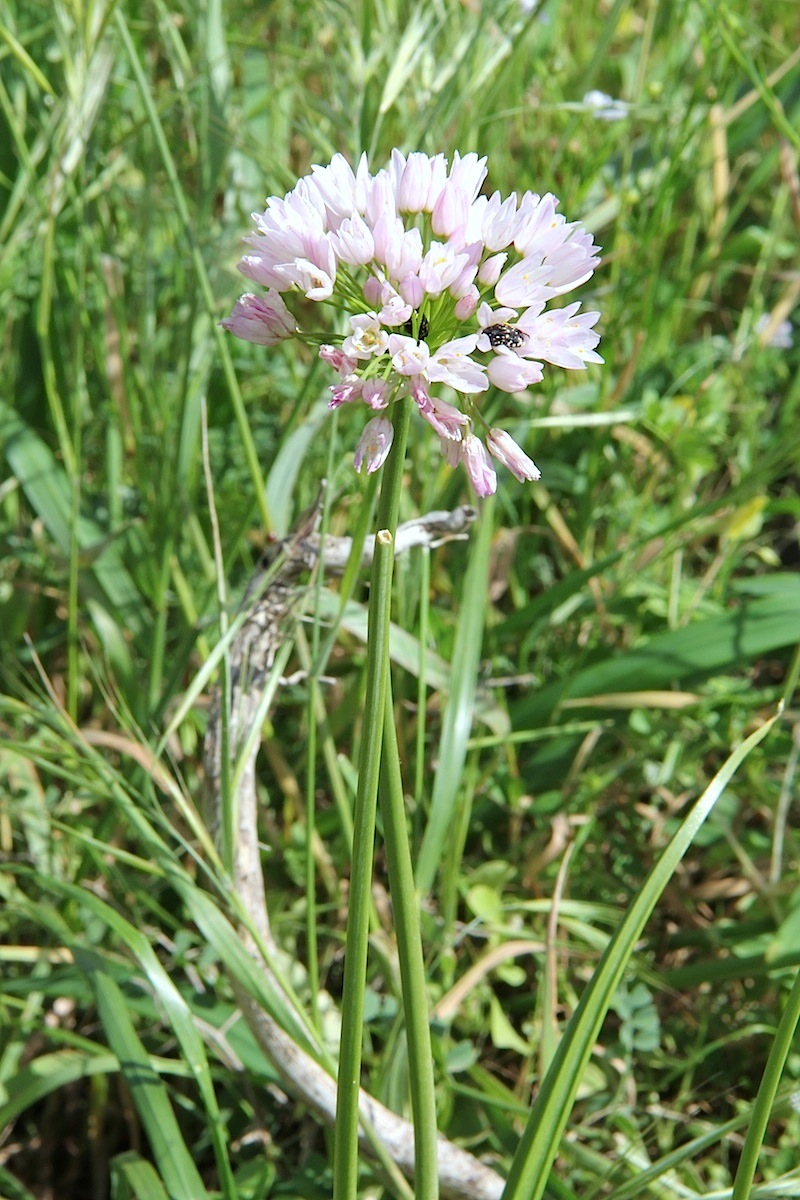

Scientific classification
- Kingdom: Plantae
- Clade: Embryophytes
- Clade: Tracheophytes
- Clade: Angiosperms
- Clade: Monocots
- Order: Asparagales
- Family: Amaryllidaceae
- Subfamily: Allioideae
- Genus: Allium
- Species: A. trifoliatum

Binomial name
- Allium trifoliatum Cirillo

Synonyms
- Synonymy: Allium graecum d'Urv.; Allium subhirsutum var. graecum (d'Urv.) Regel; Allium subhirsutum subsp. graecum (d'Urv.) K.Richt.; Allium subhirsutum var. hirsutum Regel; Allium subhirsutum subsp. trifoliatum (Cirillo) Arcang.; Allium subhirsutum var. trifoliatum (Cirillo) Batt. & Trab.; Allium trifoliatum var. graecum (d'Urv.) Nyman; Allium trifoliatum subsp. hirsutum (Regel) Kollmann; Allium trifoliatum var. sterile Kollmann

= Allium trifoliatum =

Species of flowering plant

Allium trifoliatum, commonly called pink garlic or hirsute garlic, is a Mediterranean species of wild onion. It is native to France, Cyprus, Malta, Italy (Sicily, Sardinia, Calabria, Basilicata, Apulia, Campania, Abruzzo), Greece, Egypt, Turkey, Lebanon, Palestine, and Israel.

Allium trifoliatum is a perennial herb up to 30 cm tall. It has a tight umbel with short pedicels. Tepals are white, sometimes with pink to red midveins.

formerly included

- Allium trifoliatum race loiseleurii Rouy, now called Allium subhirsutum subsp. subhirsutum
- Allium trifoliatum subsp. obtusitepalum Svent, now called Allium subhirsutum subsp. obtusitepalum (Svent.) G.Kunkel
