= Moly (herb) =

Herb in Greek and Roman legend

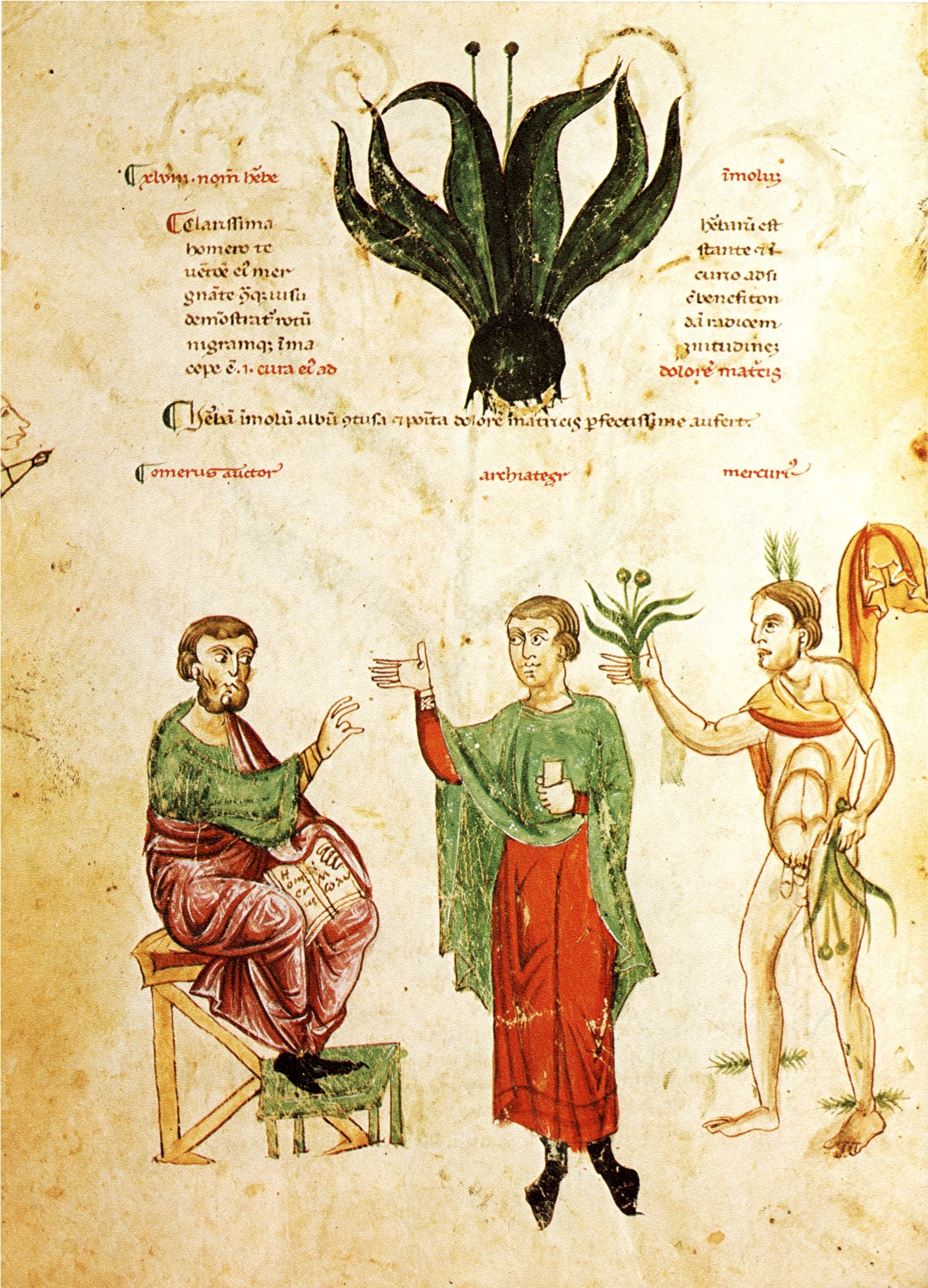
Page from Codex Medicina Antiqua (fol. 61 verso). Depicted is the herb herba immolum, a.k.a. "Moly" in Homer's (Odyssey 10, 302–306).

Moly (English: /ˈmoʊliː/, MOH-lee; Greek: μῶλυ, [mɔːly]) is a magical herb mentioned in book 10 of Homer's Odyssey.

== In Greek myth ==
In Homer's Odyssey, Hermes gives this herb to Odysseus to protect him from Circe's poison and magic, while going to her palace to rescue his friends. These friends came together with him from the island of Aeolus after they escaped from the Laestrygonians.

According to the "New History" of Ptolemy Hephaestion (according to Photius) and Eustathius, the plant mentioned by Homer grew from the blood of the Giant Picolous killed on Circe's island, by Helios, father and ally of Circe, when the Giant tried to attack Circe. In this description the flower had a black root, for the colour of the blood of the slain Giant, and a white flower, either for the white Sun that killed him, or the fact that Circe had grown pale with terror. A derivation of the name was given, from the "hard" (Greek malos) combat with the Giant.

Homer also describes moly by saying "The root was black, while the flower was as white as milk; the gods call it Moly, Dangerous for a mortal man to pluck from the soil, but not for the deathless gods. All lies within their power". So Ovid describes in book 14 of his Metamorphoses: "A white bloom with a root of black".

== Assignment to a species ==
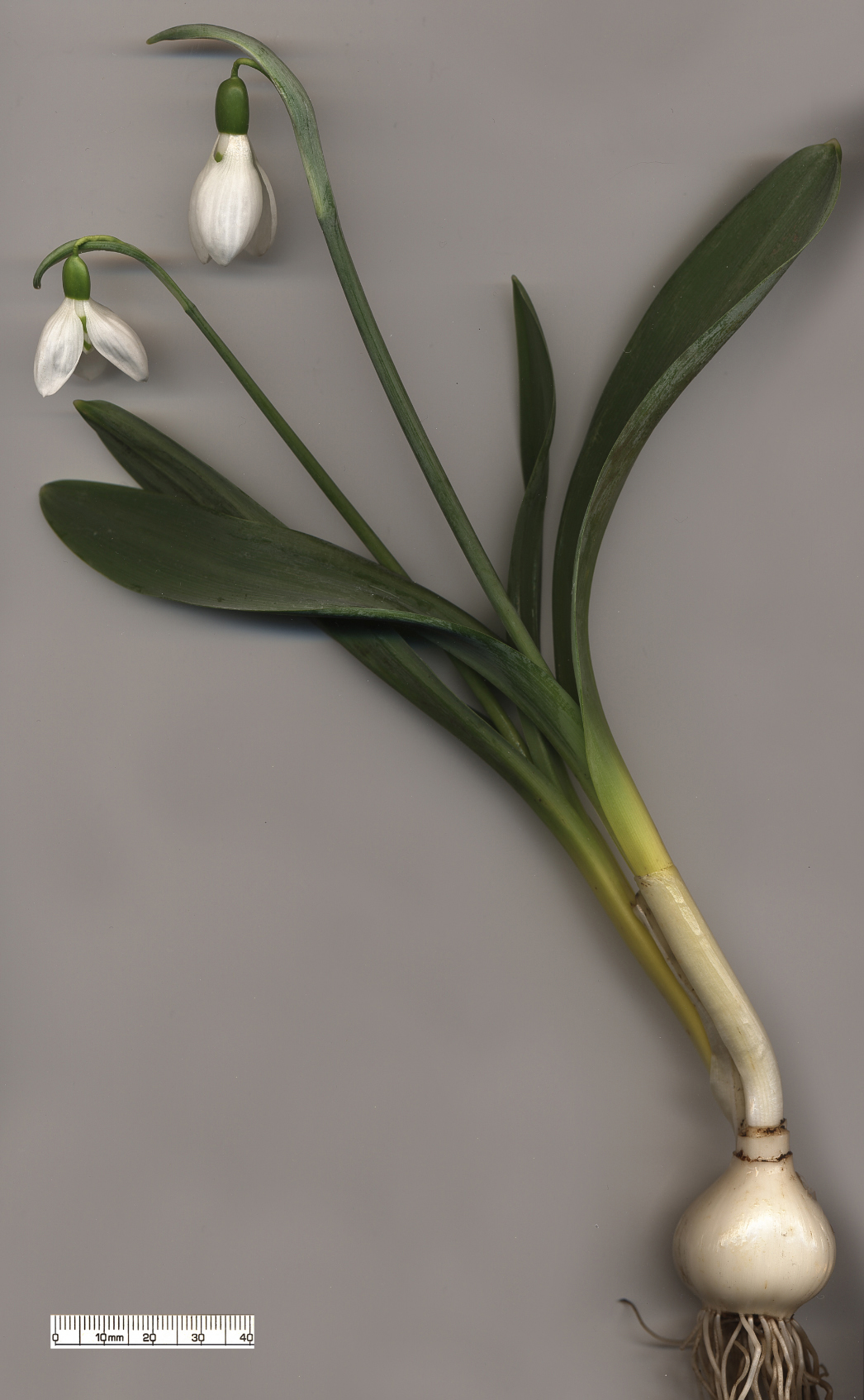
Snowdrop, which biologists proposed as real-world moly in 1983.

There has been much controversy as to the identification, and some authors point out that as a fictional element of the story, it does not necessarily correspond to any real plant.

Kurt Sprengel believed that the plant is identical to Allium nigrum as Homer describes it. Some also believe that it may have been Allium moly, instead, which is named after the mythical herb. Philippe Champault decides in favour of the Peganum harmala (of the family Nitrariaceae), (Note: Chisholm (1911), p. 681 cites Bérard (1906).) the Syrian or African rue (Greek πἠγανον), from the seeds and roots of which the vegetable alkaloid harmaline is extracted. The flowers are white with green stripes. Victor Bérard (1906) relying partly on a Semitic root, (Note: Chisholm (1911), p. 681 cites Bérard (1906).) prefers the Atriplex halimus (Note: Mediterranean saltbush or sea orache, Atriplex halimus from atriplex, a Latin form of Greek ἀτράφαξυς, and halimos ἅλιμος, "marine".) family Amaranthaceae – a herb or low shrub common on the south European coasts. These identifications are noticed by R. M. Henry (1906), (Note: Chisholm (1911), p. 681 cites Henry (1906)) who illustrates the Homeric account by passages in the Paris and Leiden magical papyri, and argues that moly is probably a magical name, derived perhaps from Phoenician or Egyptian sources, for a plant that cannot be certainly identified. He shows that the "difficulty of pulling up" the plant is not a merely physical one, but rather connected with the peculiar powers claimed by magicians.

Medical historians have speculated that the transformation to pigs was not intended literally, but instead refers to anticholinergic intoxication whose symptoms include amnesia, hallucinations, and delusions. This diagnosis would make "moly" align well with the snowdrop, a flower of the region that contains galantamine, an anticholinesterase that therefore might counteract anticholinergics. In 2024, a study suggested the possibility that the plant in question is, in fact, an ethnobotanical complex composed of several phylogenetically close species, which could have been used interchangeably due to their similar properties.

== In other works ==
- In Tennyson's The Lotos-Eaters, the moly is paired with the amaranth ("propt on beds of amaranth and moly").
- Linnaeus identified the mythical plant with golden garlic (Allium moly), although the perianth of this species is yellow, not white.
- Thom Gunn made his poem Moly the title poem of his 1971 collection.
- In John Lyly's play Gallathea, Diana instructs her nymphs to "think love like Homer's moly, a white leaf and a black root, a fair show, and a bitter taste."

== Sources ==
- Homer (1898). The Odyssey. Translated by Butler, Samuel. Book X . Archived from the original on 2008-12-17.
