= Summertime Sadness (Cedric Gervais remix) =

"Summertime Sadness (Remix)"
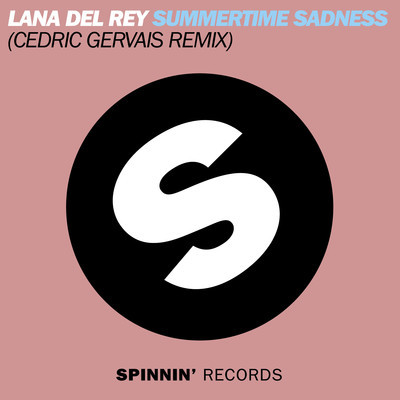

Single by Lana Del Rey and Cedric Gervais
- Released: 11 July 2013
- Genre: Progressive house
- Length: 6:56 (extended mix); 3:36 (radio edit)
- Label: Spinnin'
- Songwriters: Lana Del Rey; Rick Nowels
- Producer: Cedric Gervais

Cedric Gervais singles chronology
| "Things Can Only Get Better" (2013) | "Summertime Sadness (Remix)" (2013) | "Young and Beautiful (Remix)" (2013) |

Music video
- "Summertime Sadness (Remix)" on YouTube

"Summertime Sadness (Cedric Gervais remix)" is a remix by the French DJ Cedric Gervais of the 2012 song "Summertime Sadness" by the American singer-songwriter Lana Del Rey. It won the Grammy Award for Best Remixed Recording, Non-Classical, at the 56th Annual Grammy Awards in 2014.

In January 2013, a remix by was commissioned for the record label Universal Germany. However, the remix was initially turned down by Interscope and Polydor Records, Lana Del Rey's record labels in America and the UK, respectively, but was released on Spinnin' Records. In the spring of 2013, the remix quickly surged to number one on Beatport, resulting in several radio programmers and DJs, such as Pete Tong, working the song into their radio station's rotation. BBC Radio 1 added the remix to its playlist, helping it to gain popularity around the world. Several Sirius XM radio stations began playing it, and Interscope decided to push at Top 40 radio in the United States. After positive feedback, Interscope agreed to release the remix.

== Background ==
Hesitant to accept requests for remixes from other artists, Gervais immediately consented to assist Del Rey with remixing "Summertime Sadness". He said, "Lana Del Rey came in. I didn't even ask how much money [...] I wasn't thinking if it was going to be a hit or not, I just love and respect the artist that she is." Satisfied with the finished product, Del Rey's team commissioned Gervais to produce a mix version of "Young and Beautiful".

The decision to release the new version of "Summertime Sadness" on the DJ's primary label, Spinnin' Records, was made by Cedric's manager Luke Allen (Red Light Management) to expand the song's audience to Gervais' EDM fanbase. Allen grew and built the record from grassroots, but it wasn't until he invited Interscope A&R John Ehmann to a performance at the Electric Daisy Carnival in Las Vegas that the major label came on board after Ehmann heard 60,000 people singing along to the song. Months later, the house and Eurodance track was a sleeper hit, peaking at number 6 on Billboard's Hot 100 chart. "In every country I'm going to, I hear my remix on the radio," the DJ commented on the song's success. "I started a long time ago in the business with the passion of being a DJ and all of the sudden I make a track like this I get even more excited and motivated." Becoming the most successful work of his career at the time, "Summertime Sadness" unlocked a plethora of opportunities for Gervais, including a contract for the release of a full-length album that features many high-profile dance singers, Rick Nowels (co-writer of "Summertime Sadness"'s lyrics) assisting him.

== Music video ==
Gervais' interpretation of "Summertime Sadness" received a video treatment. The majority of the video includes the same footage of the original version produced by Kyle Newman. Sam Lansky of Idolator described the remake as being "...stitched together with familiar glitchy footage of Lana in her conventional Tumblrwave style." Expanding, he said: "the euphoric house production contrasts with the melancholy aesthetic in that way that feels quintessentially Lana and, well, if nothing else, the track is straight fire." Further, Lansky remarked on the audio, stating: "The gloomy cut has received a proper single treatment" from Cedric Gervais who metamorphosed "Lana"s lachrymose original into a dancefloor stomper".

== Reception and legacy ==
Michelle Geslani of Consequence felt that the Gervais remix of "Summertime Sadness" made Lana Del Rey "more relevant than ever".

In 2015, Spin named it the 45th greatest electronic dance music (EDM) anthem of the first half of the 2010s.

== Charts ==
=== Weekly charts ===
Weekly chart performance for the Cedric Gervais remix
| Chart (2013) | Peak position |
|---|---|
| Australia (ARIA) | 3 |
| Canada Hot 100 (Billboard) | 7 |
| Canada CHR/Top 40 (Billboard) | 9 |
| Canada Hot AC (Billboard) | 13 |
| Denmark (Tracklisten) | 28 |
| France (SNEP) | 10 |
| Greece Digital Songs (Billboard) | 2 |
| Hungary (Dance Top 40) | 16 |
| Hungary (Single Top 20) | 1 |
| Ireland (IRMA) | 7 |
| Luxembourg Digital Song Sales (Billboard) | 5 |
| New Zealand (Recorded Music NZ) | 30 |
| Scotland Singles (OCC) | 2 |
| Slovakia Airplay (ČNS IFPI) | 57 |
| Spain (Promusicae) | 29 |
| UK Singles (OCC) | 4 |
| US Billboard Hot 100 | 6 |
| US Hot Dance/Electronic Songs (Billboard) | 2 |
| US Adult Pop Airplay (Billboard) | 16 |
| US Dance Club Songs (Billboard) | 15 |
| US Pop Airplay (Billboard) | 3 |
| US Rhythmic Airplay (Billboard) | 12 |

| Chart (2022–2023) | Peak position |
|---|---|
| Global 200 (Billboard) | 73 |

=== Year-end charts ===
Annual chart rankings for the Cedric Gervais remix
| Chart (2013) | Position |
|---|---|
| Australia (ARIA) | 26 |
| Canada (Canadian Hot 100) | 59 |
| France (SNEP) | 48 |
| Hungary (Dance Top 40) | 29 |
| Italy (Musica e dischi) | 44 |
| UK Singles (OCC) | 23 |
| US Billboard Hot 100 | 45 |
| US Hot Dance/Electronic Songs (Billboard) | 11 |
| US Mainstream Top 40 (Billboard) | 29 |

| Chart (2014) | Position |
|---|---|
| France (SNEP) | 136 |
| US Hot Dance/Electronic Songs (Billboard) | 19 |

| Chart (2023) | Position |
|---|---|
| Australia (ARIA) | 100 |
| Global 200 (Billboard) | 77 |

| Chart (2024) | Position |
|---|---|
| Global 200 (Billboard) | 70 |

| Chart (2025) | Position |
|---|---|
| Global 200 (Billboard) | 101 |

=== Decade-end charts ===
2010s chart rankings for the Cedric Gervais remix
| Chart (2010–2019) | Position |
|---|---|
| US Hot Dance/Electronic Songs (Billboard) | 35 |

== Certifications ==
Certifications and sales for the Cedric Gervais remix
| Region | Certification | Certified units/sales |
|---|---|---|
| Australia (ARIA) | 12× Platinum | 840,000^{‡} |
| Denmark (IFPI Danmark) | 2× Platinum | 180,000^{‡} |
| Netherlands (NVPI) | Gold | 10,000^{^} |
| New Zealand (RMNZ) | Gold | 7,500^{*} |
| United Kingdom (BPI) | 3× Platinum | 1,800,000^{‡} |
| United States | — | 2,000,000 |
^{*} Sales figures based on certification alone.^{^} Shipments figures based on certification alone.^{‡} Sales+streaming figures based on certification alone.
