= Molly (Tyga song) =

Promotional single by Tyga featuring Cedric Gervais, Wiz Khalifa and Mally Mall

from the album Hotel California
- Released: March 29, 2013
- Recorded: 2013
- Genre: Hip hop; trap
- Length: 3:39
- Label: Young Money; Cash Money; Republic
- Songwriters: Michael Stevenson; Cameron Thomaz; Jamal Rashid; Jess Jackson; Desmond Mapp; Cedric Depasquale; Carlos Cid
- Producers: Dez Dynamic; Jackson; Mally Mall (add.); Tyga (add.)

"Molly" is a song by American recording artist Tyga, released March 29, 2013 as the first promotional single for his third studio album, Hotel California. The song peaked at number 66 on the Billboard Hot 100. It heavily samples Cedric Gervais's 2012 single of the same name.

== Music video ==
On March 21, 2013 Tyga shot the music video for "Molly" with Wiz Khalifa and Mally Mall. It was shot in downtown Los Angeles and was directed by Colin Tilley. He described the video as "I, Robot meets Alice in Wonderland". On April 7, 2013, the music video was released.

== Chart performance ==
The song peaked at number 66 on the US Billboard Hot 100, and song spent a total of 11 weeks on the chart. On March 19, 2020, the single was certified platinum by the Recording Industry Association of America (RIAA) for combined sales and album-equivalent units over a million units in the United States.

== Track listing ==
Digital download
No.	Title	Writer(s)	Producer(s)	Length
1.	"Molly" (featuring Wiz Khalifa, Cedric Gervais, and Mally Mall)	Michael Stevenson; Cameron Thomaz; Jess Jackson; Jamal Rashid; Desmond Mapp; Cedric Depasquale; Carlos Cid	Dez Dynamic; Jackson; Mall (add.); Tyga (add.)	3:38

== Charts ==
=== Weekly charts ===
Chart (2013)	Peak position
US Billboard Hot 100	66
US Hot R&B/Hip-Hop Songs (Billboard)	22
US Rap Songs (Billboard)	16

=== Year-end charts ===
Chart (2013)	Position
US Hot R&B/Hip-Hop Songs (Billboard)	76

== Certifications ==
Region	Certification	Certified units/sales
United States (RIAA)	Platinum	1,000,000^{‡}
^{‡} Sales+streaming figures based on certification alone.
