= Mahle =

Mahle may refer to:

- Ernst Mahle (1929–2025), Brazilian composer and orchestra conductor
- Greg Mahle (born 1993), American baseball player
- Melissa Boyle Mahle, writer and former CIA officer
- Tyler Mahle (born 1994), American baseball player
- Mahle GmbH, a large German industrial company automotive supplier
- MAHLE Powertrain, the engineering services division of Mahle GmbH
- Mahle people, a Bangladeshi ethnic group

== See also ==
- Mahli (disambiguation)
