= Allium scorzonerifolium =

Scientific classification
- Kingdom: Plantae
- Clade: Tracheophytes
- Clade: Angiosperms
- Clade: Monocots
- Order: Asparagales
- Family: Amaryllidaceae
- Subfamily: Allioideae
- Genus: Allium
- Species: A. scorzonerifolium

Binomial name
- Allium scorzonerifolium Desf. ex Redouté

Synonyms
- Allium stramineum Boiss. & Reut.; Allium moly var. xericiense Pérez Lara; Allium scorzonerifolium var. xericiense (Pérez Lara) R.Fern.

Species of flowering plant

Allium scorzonerifolium is a yellow-flowered species of wild onion native to Spain, Portugal, and Morocco.
