= Moli language =

Moli may be

- Moli language (Choiseul)
- Moli language (Guadalcanal)
