= Allium cassium =

Scientific classification
- Kingdom: Plantae
- Clade: Embryophytes
- Clade: Tracheophytes
- Clade: Spermatophytes
- Clade: Angiosperms
- Clade: Monocots
- Order: Asparagales
- Family: Amaryllidaceae
- Subfamily: Allioideae
- Genus: Allium
- Species: A. cassium

Binomial name
- Allium cassium Boiss.

Synonyms
- Allium roseum var. cassium (Boiss.) Regel; Allium cydni Schott & Kotschy; Allium roseum var. puberulum Regel; Allium cassium var. hirtellum Boiss.; Allium troodi H.Lindb.

Species of flowering plant

Allium cassium is a species of flowering plant in the Amaryllidaceae family. It is a wild onion native to Turkey, Lebanon, Israel, and Cyprus.

== Description ==
Allium cassium has a stem that ranges from 10 to 25 cm (3.93–9.84 inches) in height and thin linear leaves of a slightly smaller size. It grows from bulbs, usually in clusters. Its flowers are white or light pink and bell-shaped. Additionally, they are 7 to 10 mm long.
