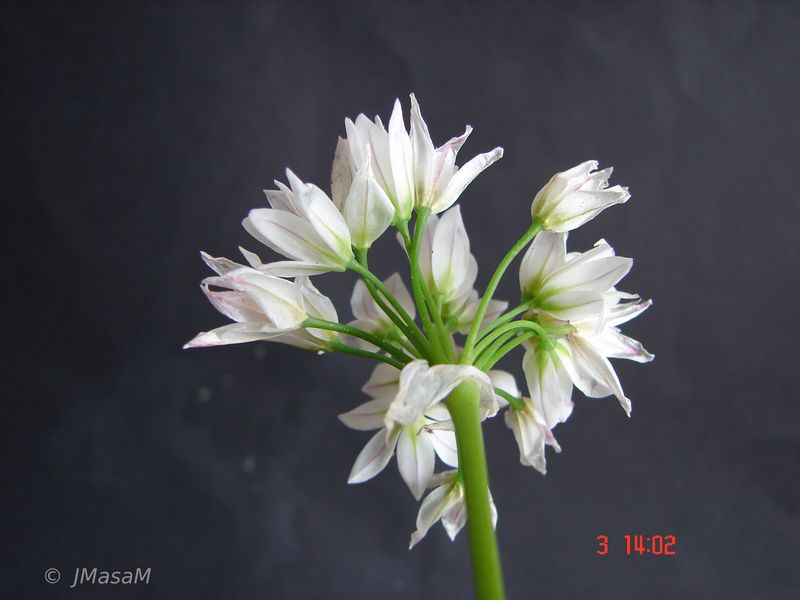

Scientific classification
- Kingdom: Plantae
- Clade: Tracheophytes
- Clade: Angiosperms
- Clade: Monocots
- Order: Asparagales
- Family: Amaryllidaceae
- Subfamily: Allioideae
- Genus: Allium
- Species: A. massaessylum

Binomial name
- Allium massaessylum Batt. & Trab.

Synonyms
- Allium moly subsp. massaessylum (Batt. & Trab.) Vindt; Allium rigidiflorum Cout.; Allium transtagana Welw. ex Samp.

= Allium massaessylum =

Species of flowering plant

Allium massaessylum is a Western Mediterranean species of wild onion native to Spain, Portugal, Morocco, and Algeria.
