= Molly (Cedric Gervais song) =

Single by Cedric Gervais
- Released: 3 July 2012 (U.S. and Canada single); 22 July 2012 (worldwide EP); 21 August 2012 (remixes)
- Recorded: 2011
- Genre: Acid house
- Label: Spinnin', 3 Beat, Big Beat
- Songwriters: Cedric Gervais, Carlos Cid
- Producers: Cedric Gervais, Carlos Cid

Cedric Gervais singles chronology
"Love Is the Answer" (2011)	"Molly" (2012)	"You Got the Look" (2012)

"Molly" is a song by French-American DJ Cedric Gervais, first announced by Gervais through his YouTube channel on 9 April 2012. The song was released as a single in the United States and Canada on 3 July 2012 through Big Beat Records, and as an EP in the United Kingdom on 22 July, and then worldwide on 21 August 2012 through Spinnin' Records and 3 Beat Productions, including remixes. It was written and produced by Cedric Gervais and Carlos Cid. The song was used in the 2013 film Pain & Gain.

"Molly" was heavily sampled in American recording artist Tyga's 2013 song of the same name. It was released as a promotional single for his third studio album Hotel California.

== Controversy ==
American singer Madonna infamously referenced the song while promoting her song "Girl Gone Wild". Her mention caused great controversy, inciting criticism from electronic dance music producer deadmau5. The term 'Molly' is a reference to the dance drug MDMA.

== Music video ==
A music video to accompany the release of "Molly" was first released onto YouTube on 2 April 2012 at a total length of four minutes and nine seconds.

== Track listings ==
Digital download - Single
No.	Title	Length
1.	"Molly" (Original Mix)	6:49
2.	"Molly" (Radio Edit)	3:31

Digital download - EP
No.	Title	Length
1.	"Molly" (UK Radio Edit)	2:45
2.	"Molly" (Club Radio Edit)	3:31
3.	"Molly" (Original Mix)	6:49
4.	"Molly" (Danny Howard Mix)	5:43
5.	"Molly" (Borgore 'Suck My Tit' Mix)	4:02

Digital download - Remixes
No.	Title	Length
1.	"Molly" (Borgore 'The Straight Edge' Remix)	4:01
2.	"Molly" (Static Revenger Remix)	5:11
3.	"Molly" (Laurent Simeca Remix)	5:45
4.	"Molly" (C.I.D. Remix)	5:54
5.	"Molly" (Danny Howard Remix)	5:38
6.	"Molly" (Chris Arnott Remix)	5:09
7.	"Molly" (Acid Jack Remix)	5:38
8.	"Molly" (Bobby Vena Remix)	6:02
9.	"Molly" (Mind Electric Re-Acid)	5:29

Digital download - Beatport Remixes
No.	Title	Length
1.	"Molly" (Quintino Remix)	5:50

== Charts ==
Chart (2012)	Peak position
Belgium Dance (Ultratop Flanders)	26
Belgium (Ultratip Bubbling Under Flanders)	41
Scotland Singles (OCC)	18
UK Dance (OCC)	5
UK Singles (OCC)	26
US Hot Dance/Electronic Songs (Billboard)	46

== Release history ==
Region	Date	Format	Label
US, Canada	3 July 2012	Digital download - Single	Big Beat Records
UK	22 July 2012	Digital download - EP	Spinnin' Records; 3 Beat Productions
Worldwide	21 Aug 2012	Digital download - Remixes	Big Beat Records
