= Allium permixtum =

Scientific classification
- Kingdom: Plantae
- Clade: Tracheophytes
- Clade: Angiosperms
- Clade: Monocots
- Order: Asparagales
- Family: Amaryllidaceae
- Subfamily: Allioideae
- Genus: Allium
- Species: A. permixtum

Binomial name
- Allium permixtum Guss.

Synonyms
- Allium roseum subsp. permixtum (Guss.) Nyman; Allium subhirsutum subsp. permixtum (Guss.) K.Richt.

Species of flowering plant

Allium permixtum is an Italian species of wild onion native to Sicily and Abruzzo, though it is most likely extinct in Sicily.
