= Summertime Sadness =

2012 single by Lana Del Rey

Single by Lana Del Rey

from the album Born to Die
- Released: June 22, 2012
- Studio: The Cutting Room (New York City)
- Genre: Pop; trip hop
- Length: 4:25 (album version); 4:12 (radio mix)
- Label: Interscope
- Songwriters: Lana Del Rey; Rick Nowels
- Producers: Emile Haynie; Rick Nowels

Lana Del Rey singles chronology
"National Anthem" (2012)	"Summertime Sadness" (2012)	"Ride" (2012)

Music video
- "Summertime Sadness" on YouTube

"Summertime Sadness" is a song by American singer-songwriter Lana Del Rey from her second studio album, Born to Die (2012). It was released on June 22, 2012, by Interscope Records as the fourth single of the album. In the spring of 2013, "Summertime Sadness" reached number one in Poland, Ukraine and Armenia. Charting across Europe, the single reached the top 10 in Austria, Bulgaria, Germany, Greece, Luxembourg, and Switzerland. A pop and trip hop ballad, trap and house remixes of "Summertime Sadness" helped Del Rey break into the US Hot Dance Club Songs chart. In the latter, Del Rey's song became a modest hit and marked her first foray into the dance club chart. On the accompanying Dance/Mix Show Airplay chart, the single gave Del Rey her first US number-one single in August 2013. In September 2021, the song was ranked number 456 on Rolling Stone's 500 Greatest Songs of All Time.

In the summer of 2013, a remixed version of the track by Cedric Gervais was released to American contemporary hit radio and helped the single become a sleeper hit, debuting at 72 on the Billboard Hot 100 and becoming the highest-charting solo single of her career in the U.S. with a peak of 6. Switzerland and Austria gave "Summertime Sadness" a Gold certification; it reached platinum status in Germany and became a top 40-year-end hit. The record also reached number 4 in the UK Singles Chart. It joined BBC Radio 1's and BBC Radio 2's playlists. Gervais' remixed version won a 2014 Grammy Award for Best Remixed Recording, Non-Classical.

The song's accompanying music video depicts Del Rey and actress Jaime King as a couple. As the storyline progresses, both characters commit suicide by jumping from perilous heights. Cinematography was handled primarily by King's husband, Kyle Newman. The video gained success on video-hosting website YouTube, and circulated through social media websites such as Facebook and Twitter. In general, critics lauded the artistry of the single's music video, comparing it to photo-sharing site Instagram. The musical arrangement was composed by Del Rey's long-time collaborators Emile Haynie and Rick Nowels, with Nowels and Del Rey writing the lyrics.

== Lyrical composition and themes ==
"Summertime Sadness"
A sample of the song's final chorus, in which Del Rey states, "Kiss me hard before you go / Summertime sadness / I just wanted you to know/That, baby, you're the best"

"Summertime Sadness" was released as a digital download on June 22, 2012, in Austria, Germany, and Switzerland. Written by Lana Del Rey and her long-time collaborator, Rick Nowels, the record was produced by Nowels and Emile Haynie. "Summertime Sadness" is a pop and trip hop ballad. It is written in the key of C♯ minor with a tempo of 125 beats per minute. Del Rey's vocals range from the note of C♯_{3} and C♯_{5}. Various club remixes of the song were created, including one by Ryan Hemsworth. Spin said Hemsworth's trap remix, "teases us with a little stoney dubwise bubble, and then dunks the entire thing into a glistening pool of purple promethazine goo. The only sharp sounds come from the barrage of skittering beats, plus some space lasers and the like." "Summertime Sadness"'s Adam Freeland remix employed house beats and strong synthesizers that creates a "dazzling dance floor production."

The song's video focuses on a lesbian couple reminiscing on positive moments before both commit suicide. Pop Dust writer Nate Jones compared the introductory lyrics, "I got my red dress on tonight / Dancing in the dark in the pale moonlight" to "Dancing in the Dark" by Bruce Springsteen, affirming that the song's inherent somberness was building to its gloomy denouement by first displaying positive memories the song's lovers experienced. The following two stanzas of: "Got my hair up real big beauty queen style / High heels off, I'm feeling alive" and "Honey, I'm on fire, I feel it everywhere / Nothing scares me anymore" building on the same lyrical imagery. Lyrically, the song reaches a sadder conclusion with the chorus, "Kiss me hard before you go / Summertime sadness / I just wanted you to know / That, baby, you're the best." The darkest portion of the song's story swells at the beginning of the second verse: "I'm feelin' electric tonight / Cruising down the coast goin' 'bout 99 / Got my bad baby by my heavenly side / I know if I go, I'll die happy tonight." As a whole, "Summertime Sadness" follows a typical pop song structure: verse, chorus, verse, chorus, bridge, chorus, with the chorus circulating several times before the song's end.

== Reception and legacy ==
"Summertime Sadness" received positive reviews from journalists. In his track-by-track review for Billboard magazine, Andrew Hampp wrote about "Summertime Sadness" that "the pouty title alone drew giggles at Del Rey's Bowery gig, but the song itself proves to be one of the more durable tracks here even if its lyrics start to get redundant ('Kiss me hard before you go... That baby you're the best')". Los Angeles Times named it among the best tracks on the album along with "Video Games" and "Dark Paradise". The song is also referenced in the Chainsmokers' hit single "#Selfie".

== Music video ==
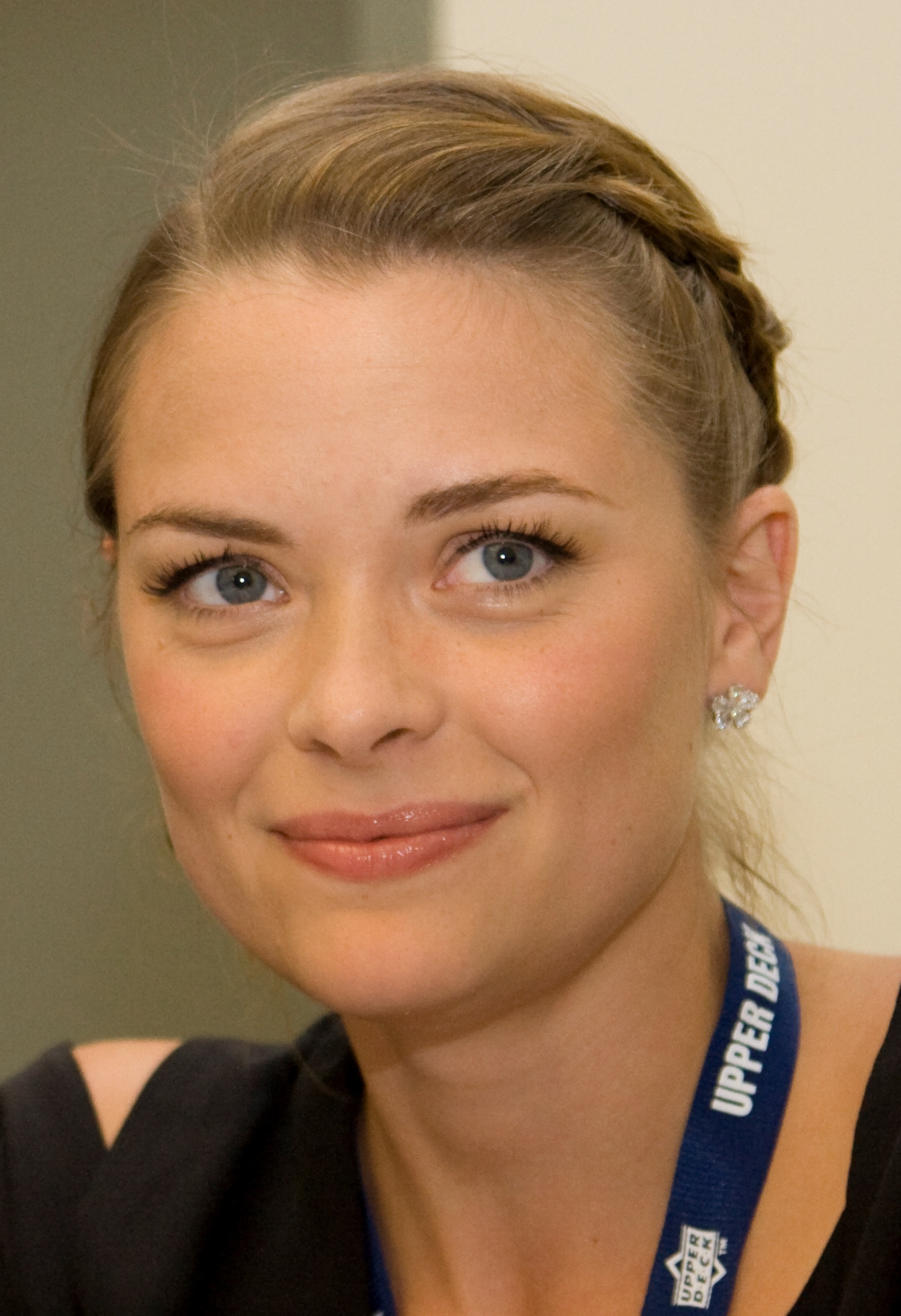
The role of Lana Del Rey's friend in the music video is played by Jaime King, whose husband, Kyle Newman, directed the video.

The music video for "Summertime Sadness" was filmed in April 2012 in Santa Clarita, California. It was directed by Kyle Newman and Spencer Susser. Newman's wife, actress Jaime King, stars along with Del Rey in the video, which tells the sad story of two women, who both end their own lives. King said about the video that, "It's about not being able to live without the one you love, friend or lover it doesn't matter, that's whatever you want it to be." Actor Alex Pettyfer reportedly also helped out on set as a production assistant.

The radio edit of the video was released on July 20, 2012, in Germany on ClipFish. The same day, the video with the album version of the song was released on Lana Del Rey's YouTube channel. That week, Del Rey gained 69,000 new followers on both Facebook and Twitter.

=== Synopsis ===
The music video opens with a woman saying, "Remember, I'll always love you, bye". After the phone call, Del Rey sings the opening lyrics and jumps off the cliff. The next scenes tell the story of two women (played by Del Rey and Jaime King) who have become suicidal.

In the next scene, the forlorn King seeks out the nearest bridge in the city and then stands on its ledge in a tear-stricken state. The next scenes depict a statue of Jesus Christ, Del Rey looking into the distance and a phone smashing into pieces as it hits the floor, hinting at Del Rey's realization that her girlfriend has killed herself. Feeling at fault for her lover's death, Del Rey spreads her arms wide mimicking the statue of Jesus Christ and jumps off the cliff.

The last scenes show both women in happier times, Del Rey turns to see King and smiles; both women are seen pouting and glancing seductively over their shoulders towards one another. As the women embrace, the smoke in the atmosphere gathers and they disappear. It's shown, after both suicides, that a haunting image of Del Rey (presumably her ghost) is seen walking down a long road towards the camera.

=== Reception ===
The video received generally favorable reviews from critics. Crystal Bell, a blogger for Huffington Post, called the video an "ode to Instagram," and compared it to Del Rey's previous videos. Carrie Battan of Pitchfork Media wrote, that "it's certainly no seven-minute re-enactment of the life of the Kennedy family, but it still offers the trademark LDR touch. Instagram-like footage, very forlorn faces, possible suicide attempts, and a very special guest." Jenna Hally Rubenstein, of MTV's Buzzworthy blog, considers that the coral-smoked scenes are Del Rey in the afterlife, post-suicide, saying it may be unlikely as "the clip closes with an image of Lana and her ghost walking alone down an empty road." Further, she said, "Sad, sad times, y'all. But then again what else did you expect from a Lana video? Sunshine, glitter and ice cream cones? Probably not." Brennan Carley of Billboard noted that "keeping the buzz alive while sticking with sepia-tones and a healthy dose of melodramatics, Lana Del Rey probes a crumbling relationship in the music video [...] the video traces the women's relationship with spliced together film bits – much like the effects used in her earlier efforts – and foggy scenes of the stars pouting and glancing seductively over their shoulders." Spin magazine writer Marc Hogan found that the video recalled Del Rey's breakout video for "Video Games". He added, that "more provocative, though, is the hint of romance-gone-sour between Del Rey and the character played by actress Jaime King. Because this is a Lana Del Rey video, it's not spoiling anything to say there's a Thelma and Louise-like twist." Entertainment website Spinner called the visual "weird. It's beautifully shot, sepia-soaked and melodramatic. The singer's bestie, played by the very lovely actress Jamie King, is also pretty sad about summer ending."

== Live performances ==
In 2012, Del Rey performed "Summertime Sadness" at the Irving Plaza, along with "Million Dollar Man", while drenched in purple lights. New York Times writer Bradley Sterns described Del Rey's vocal style during the Irving Plaza performance as "lounge singer crooning". Along with "Million Dollar Man" and "Summertime Sadness", Del Rey also sang "Video Games", "Born to Die", "Lolita", and "Without You".

== Cover versions ==
In 2013, Miley Cyrus covered the song for BBC Radio 1's Live Lounge.

Marc Almond covered the song for BBC's Radio 2 Piano Room series on 11 July 2024.

Doom metal band Frayle covered the song in their album Heretics & Lullabies released on 10 October 2025.

Symphonic metal band Within Temptation recorded a cover in 2012 which was later released on The Q-Music Sessions and as a bonus track on Hydra.

== Charts ==
=== Weekly charts ===
Weekly chart performance for "Summertime Sadness"
Chart (2012–2014)	Peak position
Austria (Ö3 Austria Top 40)	8
Belgium (Ultratop 50 Flanders)	15
Belgium (Ultratop 50 Wallonia)	17
Brazil Hot 100 Airplay (Billboard Brasil)	75
Bulgaria Airplay (BAMP)	3
CIS Airplay (TopHit)	10
Czech Republic Airplay (ČNS IFPI)	42
Czech Republic Singles Digital (ČNS IFPI)	36
France (SNEP)	10
Germany (GfK)	4
Greece Digital Songs (Billboard)	3
Iceland (RÚV)	14
Israel International Airplay (Media Forest)	10
Italy (FIMI)	6
Mexico Anglo Airplay (Monitor Latino)	15
Netherlands (Single Top 100)	53
New Zealand (Recorded Music NZ)	23
Poland Airplay (ZPAV)	1
Russia Airplay (TopHit)	9
Slovakia Singles Digital (ČNS IFPI)	53
Sweden (Sverigetopplistan)	20
Switzerland (Schweizer Hitparade)	3
Ukraine Airplay (TopHit)	8
US Hot Rock & Alternative Songs (Billboard)	5

Chart (2022–2024)	Peak position
Greece International (IFPI)	22
India International (IMI)	11
Poland (Polish Streaming Top 100)	95

=== Year-end charts ===
Annual chart rankings for "Summertime Sadness"
Chart (2012)	Position
Austria (Ö3 Austria Top 40)	44
Germany (Media Control AG)	21
Switzerland (Schweizer Hitparade)	35

Chart (2013)	Position
Belgium (Ultratop Wallonia)	64
Hungary (Rádiós Top 40)	58
Italy (FIMI)	39
Russia Airplay (TopHit)	39
Sweden (Sverigetopplistan)	80
Ukraine Airplay (TopHit)	44

Chart (2014)	Position
Belgium (Ultratop Wallonia)	99
Italy (FIMI)	67
Russia Airplay (TopHit)	126
Sweden (Sverigetopplistan)	70

Chart (2023)	Position
UK Singles (OCC)	96

Chart (2024)	Position
France (SNEP)	148
India International (IMI)	10

Chart (2025)	Position
India International (IMI)	18

== Certifications ==
Sales and certifications for "Summertime Sadness"
Region	Certification	Certified units/sales
Austria (IFPI Austria)	4× Platinum	120,000^{*}
Brazil (Pro-Música Brasil)	2× Diamond	500,000^{‡}
Canada (Music Canada)	Diamond	800,000^{‡}
Germany (BVMI)	3× Platinum	900,000^{‡}
Italy (FIMI)	3× Platinum	150,000^{‡}
Mexico (AMPROFON)	Platinum	60,000^{*}
New Zealand (RMNZ)	7× Platinum	210,000^{‡}
Portugal (AFP)	4× Platinum	40,000^{‡}
Spain (Promusicae)	3× Platinum	180,000^{‡}
Sweden (GLF)	3× Platinum	120,000^{‡}
Switzerland (IFPI Switzerland)	5× Platinum	150,000^{‡}
United Kingdom (BPI)	5× Platinum	3,000,000^{‡}
United States (RIAA)	8× Platinum	8,000,000^{‡}
Streaming
Greece (IFPI Greece)	2× Platinum	4,000,000^{†}
^{*} Sales figures based on certification alone.^{^} Shipments figures based on certification alone.^{‡} Sales+streaming figures based on certification alone.^{†} Streaming-only figures based on certification alone.

== Cedric Gervais remix ==
In January 2013, a remix by was commissioned for the record label Universal Germany. However, the remix was initially turned down by Interscope and Polydor Records, Lana Del Rey's record labels in America and the UK, respectively, but was released on Spinnin' Records. In the spring of 2013, the remix quickly surged to number one on Beatport, resulting in several radio programmers and DJs, such as Pete Tong, working the song into their radio station's rotation. BBC Radio 1 added the remix to its playlist, helping it to gain popularity around the world. Several Sirius XM radio stations began playing it, and Interscope decided to push at Top 40 radio in the United States. After positive feedback, Interscope agreed to release the remix.

== Track listing ==
German CD single

1. "Summertime Sadness" (Radio Mix) – 4:12
2. "Summertime Sadness" – 4:25

German remixes EP

1. "Summertime Sadness" (Radio Mix) – 4:12
2. "Summertime Sadness" – 4:25
3. "Summertime Sadness" (Radio Mix, Extended Version) – 5:06
4. "Summertime Sadness" (Hannes Fischer Nightflight Remix) – 6:41

German 12" remixes EP

1. "Summertime Sadness" (Todd Terry Remix) – 6:35
2. "Summertime Sadness" (Todd Terry Dub) – 5:37
3. "Summertime Sadness" (Hannes Fischer Nightflight Remix) – 6:41
4. "Summertime Sadness" (Marbert Rocel Remix) – 5:41

"Summertime Sadness" – Asadinho Remixes

1. "Summertime Sadness" (Asadinho Main Vocal Mix) – 8:34
2. "Summertime Sadness" (Asadinho Dub) – 7:45
3. "Summertime Sadness" (Asadinho Instrumental) – 7:00

"Summertime Sadness" – Cedric Gervais Remix

1. "Summertime Sadness" (Cedric Gervais Extended Remix) – 6:52
2. "Summertime Sadness" (Cedric Gervais Remix) – 3:34

"Summertime Sadness" – Cedric Gervais Extended Remix

1. "Summertime Sadness" (Cedric Gervais Remix) – 3:34
2. "Summertime Sadness" (Cedric Gervais Extended Remix) – 6:52

"Summertime Sadness" – MK in the Air Remix

1. "Summertime Sadness" (MK in the Air Remix) – 4:02

"Summertime Sadness" – Nick Warren Remixes

1. "Summertime Sadness" (Nick Warren's Vocal Remix) – 10:34
2. "Summertime Sadness" (Nick Warren's Skandik Dub) – 10:40
3. "Summertime Sadness" (Nick Warren's Instrumental Remix) – 10:32

== Credits and personnel ==
Credits for "Summertime Sadness" taken from Born to Die album liner.

- Lead vocals – Lana Del Rey
- Producers – Emile Haynie
- Co-producers – Rick Nowels
- Lyrics – Lana Del Rey, Rick Nowels
- Label – Interscope Records
- Strings arranged and conduction – Larry Gold
- Flute – Dan Heath
- Additional strings, guitar, and keyboards – Patrick Warren
- Additional strings – Rick Nowels
- Additional pads – Devrim Karaoglu
- Mixer – Dan Grech Marguerat
- Assistant mixer – Duncan Fuller

== Release history ==
Country	Date	Format	Label
Germany	June 22, 2012	Digital download	Universal
Austria	June 22, 2012	Digital download	Universal
Switzerland	June 22, 2012	Digital download	Universal
Germany	July 13, 2012	CD single	Universal
Germany	July 13, 2012	12" – Remix EP	Universal
United States	July 1, 2013	Mainstream radio (Cedric Gervais remix)	Interscope
United Kingdom	July 10, 2013	Mainstream radio (Cedric Gervais remix)	Interscope
United States	July 11, 2013	Digital download (Cedric Gervais remix)	Interscope
United States	July 22, 2013	Rhythmic radio	Interscope
Finland	July 23, 2013	Digital download (Cedric Gervais remix)	Polydor
France	July 23, 2013	Digital download (Cedric Gervais remix)	Polydor
Italy	July 23, 2013	Digital download (Cedric Gervais remix)	Polydor
Scandinavia	July 23, 2013	Digital download (Cedric Gervais remix)	Polydor

== See also ==
- List of highest-certified singles in Australia
