= Cedric Gervais =

French music producer (born 1979)

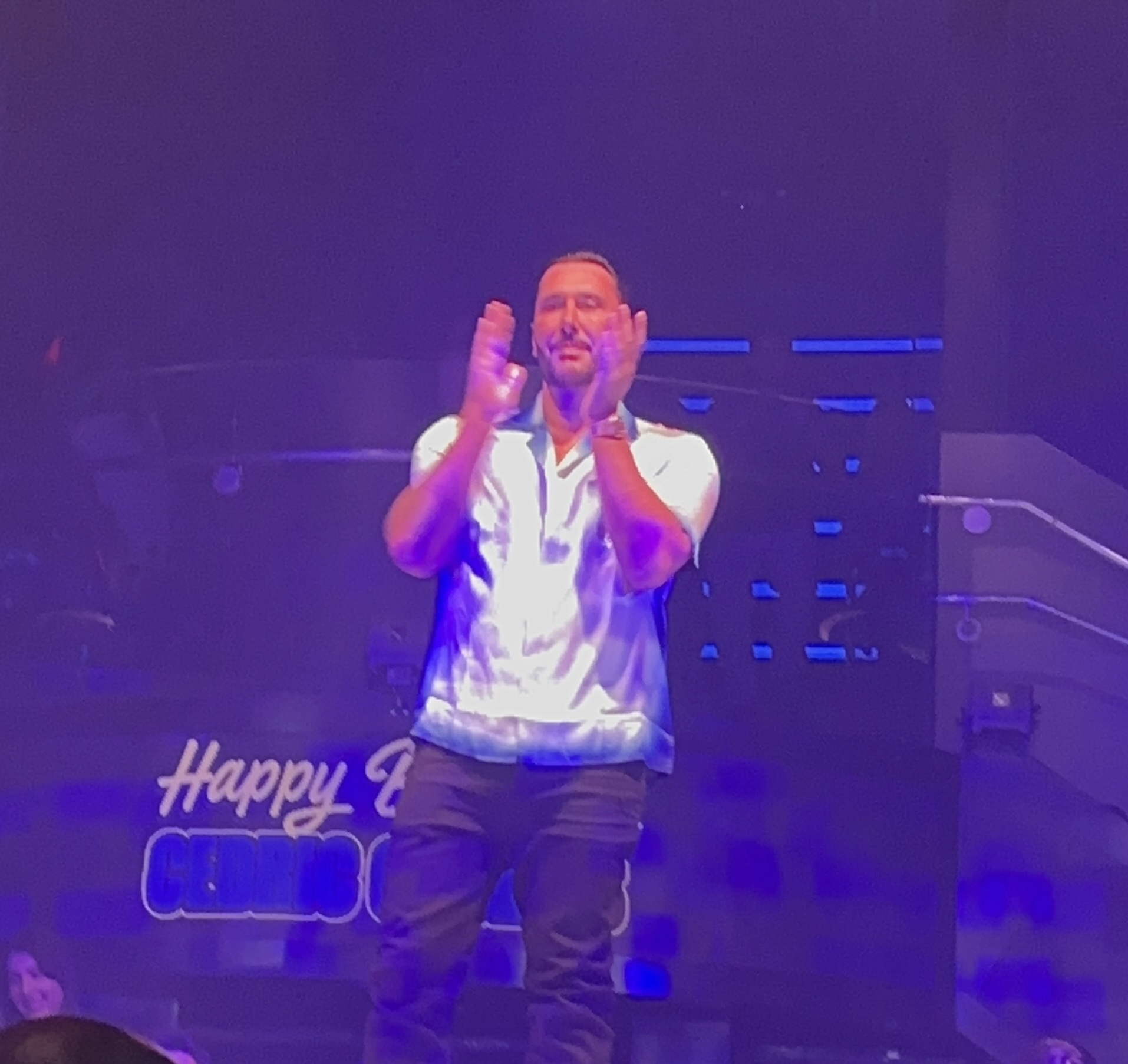
- Cedric Gervais in 2025

Background information
- Born: Cédric DePasquale; 7 June 1979 (age 47); Marseille, France
- Genres: Dance; progressive house; electro house; tech house; big room house
- Occupations: Disc jockey; record producer; actor; songwriter
- Instruments: Guitar; Logic Pro
- Labels: Sleaze; Sleaze Industries; Ultra; Armada; Spinnin'; Polydor; Interscope
- Website: cedricgervais.com

Cédric DePasquale (French pronunciation: [sedʁik dəpaskal], born 7 June 1979), better known by his stage name Cedric Gervais (French pronunciation: [sedʁik ʒɛʁvɛ]), is a French DJ, record producer and actor residing in Miami Beach, Florida. In 2013, he produced a remix of Lana Del Rey's "Summertime Sadness", for which he won a Grammy Award.

== Life and career ==
Gervais was born in Marseille, Bouches-du-Rhône. He was a resident DJ at Paris's Le Queen club. In 1998, he moved to South Beach in Miami Beach. He was 19 years old when he left for Miami, and gained residencies at Crobar (now Cameo) and Nikki Beach, before taking over as DJ at the Club Space Terrace. His first single, "Burning", was released with Ultra Records through their sublabel You. In 2006, his debut album The Experiment, featured the single "Spirit in My Life", also on Ultra Records. His production credits include working with Lenny Kravitz, Deep Dish, Steve Lawler, and Rachel Star.

His single "Mauri's Dream", from 2009, was Pete Tong's Essential Tune of the Week three weeks in a row. In 2011, Gervais released his second album, titled Miamication.

Gervais also has had two record labels of his own, Sleaze (for digital releases) and Sleaze Industries (for physical releases). He operated the labels during the 2000s releasing progressive and tribal house music.

In April 2012 Gervais released the single "Molly", which was accompanied by a very racy music video. The single was another Pete Tong Essential Tune of the Week and was the highest new dance entry in the official UK charts reaching no. 26, whilst the video racked up over 2.5 million views on YouTube. "Molly" reached no. 1 in the Buzz and Cool Cuts charts, and was day time play listed on BBC Radio 1 and Sirius.

In 2013 he produced a number of remixes: Lana Del Rey's "Summertime Sadness", Willy Moon's "Yeah Yeah", Katy Perry's "Wide Awake" and Borgore's "Decisions".

The "Summertime Sadness" remix reached number one on Beatport and remained there for two weeks in February. The track was the No. 1 added track to US radio with 35 adds throughout summer 2013. The remix was then added to BBC Radio 1's A-List, reaching number one in the UK Singles Chart, making it his most successful single to date. The track reached number six on the American Billboard 100, UK iTunes Chart to No. 2 and US iTunes Chart to No. 17. The remix was reviewed in MTV, and The Daily Star. The track also achieved 2× Platinum status in the US. He won a Grammy Award for Best Remixed Recording, Non Classical for the song.

Michael Bay's 2013 film Pain & Gain featured two of Gervais' tracks, including his hit 'Molly'. In November 2013, Gervais launched his weekly 'Miamication' Radio Show, which is to be broadcast every Saturday night on SiriusXM. His most recent single, a remix of Miley Cyrus' "Adore You" was released in May 2014 on Spinnin Records. There was also a free giveaway of the track "Hashtag" as a thank you to his fans on Facebook.

In October 2014, Gervais signed to Interscope Records with its related label Polydor Records, in the following month Interscope released his new single "Love Again" on 14 October.

On 28 May 2018, producer Dstar of American disco house group Solidisco accused Gervais of plagiarising their 2013 remix of "Take Your Time (Do It Right)" by The S.O.S. Band in a similarly titled single released by Gervais on 25 May 2018. In an Instagram conversation between Gervais and Dstar, Gervais asserted that he had never listened to the remix prior to the incident and claimed that the song structures of the original and his remake were the same. Gervais' management stated that the samples used in the remake were officially licensed, whereas Solidisco had produced an unofficial bootleg. In a statement released by Gervais, he wrote: "I had never heard of this other version, which I'm being accused of plagiarizing, until after we had delivered my single", and mentioned that the bassline which he was accused of stealing was in reality the "original bass line of the S.O.S record" which he had the legal rights to use.

== Film career ==
Gervais has appeared in a number of films. He appeared in the 2013 movie Pain & Gain directed by Michael Bay, which also featured two of Gervais' tracks "Molly" and "Ready or Not".

Cedric also appeared as an actor in the Peter Berg's drama-historic movies Deepwater Horizon and Patriots Day starring Mark Wahlberg, the first in a role with his friend magnate David Grutman. Most recently he played the role of CIA Officer Greg Vickers in Peter Berg's 2018 film Mile 22.

== Awards and nominations ==
Year	Awards	Category	Nominated work	Result
2014	56th Grammy Awards	Best Remixed Recording, Non-Classical	"Summertime Sadness (Remix)"	Won
2014	iHeartRadio Music Awards	EDM Song Of The Year	"Summertime Sadness (Remix)"	Nominated

=== DJ Magazine Top 100 DJ ===
Year	Position	Notes	Ref.
2018	87	New entry	
