= Haldern Pop =

Music festival in Germany

Coordinates: 51°46′38″N 6°28′50″E

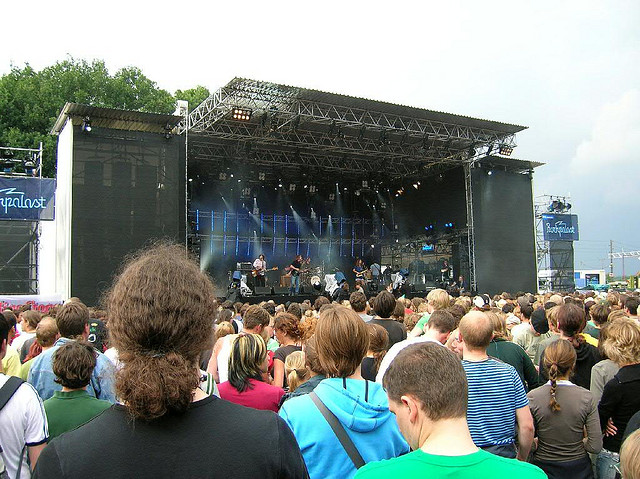
Haldern Pop

Haldern Pop is an annual German open air music festival, first held in 1984. It takes place in Rees-Haldern (North Rhine-Westphalia).

== Focus ==
The Haldern Pop Festival cannot be limited to one genre. The focus ranges from experimental metal, punk and indie-pop to jazz, classical concerts and German folk music. Played on several stages in the village of Haldern. Next to the main stage, a mirror tent on the festival grounds will be used for the performances. The other stages are the pub "Haldern Pop Bar", the St. Georg church, a youth center and a recording studio in the village.

== History ==
The festival started as an annual party on the premises of Haldern's Old Riding Arena organized by local altar servers. During the first years (1981–1983), music was played from records only. The Haldern Pop festival was officially launched with live music on 23 June 1984.

The organizers want to remain true to their concept of "the small, cozy festival in the Lower Rhine area". The venue (an old horse range) should be kept, which limits the number of visitors to about 7000 people.

Haldern Pop has long been considered one of the most unique festivals in Europe. The curation of Haldern Pop by local festival organizer Stefan Reichmann has been awarded countless prizes over the years, including the "Helga Award" for best booking and best festival. In addition, the festival was highlighted as one of the best European festivals by the Guardian in 2011.

The Haldern Pop Festival has acquired the reputation of being a trend setter in Europe. Many bands such as Mumford & Sons (2009), IDLES (2017), Sam Smith (2014), or Muse (1999) made their first steps at the Haldern Pop Festival.

=== Lineups since 1984 ===
Year	Groups	Lineup
1984	3	Herne 3, Nightwing, the Chameleons
1985	4	42 nd Street, Frantics, Grobschnitt, the Radio
1986	3	Midnite Fun (DE), N'Daga, the Radio
1987	4	Extrabreit, Midnite Fun, the Affair, the Trash
1988	3	Element of Crime, Plan B (DE), the Name (NL)
1989	4	Cliff Barnes and the Fear of Winning (DE), Dear Wolf (DE), Fischer-Z, Shiny Gnomes (DE)
1990	5	Energy Orchard, Ferryboat Bill, M. Walking on the water, Mitteregger, Norbert und die Feiglinge
1991	5	Bob Geldof and the Vegetarians of Love, Plan B, the Blue Aeroplanes, the Jeremy Days (DE), Tuff Babies
1992	5	An Emotional Fish, Heroes del Silencio, Kingmaker, the Jeremy Days (DE), Milltown Brothers
1993	7	Element of Crime, Immaculate Fools, Maldita Vecindad, Phillip Boa and the Voodooclub, the Hooters, the Silencers, the Tragically Hip
1994	6	Bettie Serveert, Bobo in White Wooden Houses, Die Muskeln (DE), Roachford, Terry Hoax (DE), the Nits
1995	9	Dear Wolf (DE), Element of Crime, Giant Sand, H-Blockx, Nationalgalerie (DE), Oil on Canvas, Seven Day Diary, Sun, the Jayhawks
1996	11	Blumfeld, Dave Matthews Band, Marion, Rekord, Samba, Selig, the Afghan Whigs, the Bluetones, the Walkabouts, Tocotronic, Wolf Maahn (DE)
1997	11	Acid Rain, All Fools Day, Darmstaedter (DE), Die Sterne, Naked Lunch, Niels Frevert (DE), Phonoroid (US/DE), Pothead (DE), Readymade (DE), Trance Groove (DE), Verge O.D.
1998	11	Addict, Fischmob, Frugal, Gautsch, Guano Apes, Heather Nova, Hothouse Flowers, Irony of Fate, Kent, Readymade (DE), Vivid (DE)
1999	14	Beta Band, Blumfeld, dEUS, Fruit, Gay Dad, James, Muse, Ozark Henry, Pussybox, Readymade, Sportfreunde Stiller, the Soundtrack of Our Lives, Tocotronic, Zita Swoon
2000	19	Bauer, Caesar, Embrace, F.E.T.T., Heather Nova, Johan, Kashmir, K's Choice, Laconic Star, Loop, Madrugada, Paul Weller, Real Mother Fishermen, Reamonn, Reef, Soulwax, Spacechild, Sportfreunde Stiller, Tom Liwa
2001	21	Blackmail, C.O.E.M., Eisen, JJ72, Josh Joplin Group, Kante, Kelis, Krezip, Mo Solid Gold, Muse, Neil Finn, Phoenix, Phonodrive, Santa's Boyfriend, Slut, Starfighter, Starsailor, the Divine Comedy, Travis, Turin Brakes, Wunschkind
2002	19	Belle & Sebastian, Doves, Fairfield, Gomez, Ian Brown, Joseph Arthur, Lawn, Leaves, Millionaire, Mull Historical Society, Savoy Grand, Saybia, Supergrass, the Cooper Temple Clause, the Electric Soft Parade, the Notwist, the Project Blonde, the Shining, Zita Swoon
2003	21	Amphibic, Aqualung, Belasco, Bolk, Bright Eyes, Daily Milk, Dead Man Ray, Ed Harcourt, Evan Dando, Frank Popp Ensemble, Isolation Years, Kaizers Orchestra, Kashmir, Koufax, Patti Smith and her Band, Spinvis, the Cardigans, The Raveonettes, Toulouse, Under Byen, Xploding Plastix
2004	29	Adam Green, Amphibic, C.O.E.M., Campus, DAAU, Das Pop, dEUS, Embrace, Gem, Ghinzu, Gisli, HAL, I Am Kloot, José Gonzáles, Keane, Kings of Leon, Mist, Nicolai Dunger, Patrick Wolf, Paul Weller, Sioen, South, Starsailor, the Divine Comedy, the Dresden Dolls, the Fold, the Soundtrack of Our Lives, Tom Helsen, Unisono
2005	29	Art Brut, Barbie Bangkok, British Sea Power, Daniel Benjamin, Dez Mona, Emiliana Torrini, Francoiz Breut, Franz Ferdinand, Franz Kasper, Gammalapagos, Kaiser Chiefs, Kaizers Orchestra, Mando Diao, Millionaire, Moneybrother, Nada Surf, Phoenix, Polyphonic Spree, Robocop Kraus, Saint Thomas, Saybia, Sportfreunde Stiller, Stijn, the Coral, the House Of Love, the Magic Numbers, the Revs, Tocotronic, Zita Swoon
2006	34	Daniel Benjamin, Ed Harcourt, Element Of Crime, Final Fantasy, GEM, Guillemots, Hollywood Pornstars, Islands, James Dean Bradfield, Kante, Klein, Lambchop, Martha Wainwright, Miracle Cure, Mogwai, Morning Runner, Motorpsycho, Mumm-Ra, Mystery Jets, Novastar, Paolo Nutini, Solo, the Cooper Temple Clause, the Divine Comedy, the Kooks, the Revs, the Rifles, the Twilight Singers, the Veils, the Waking Eyes, the Wrens, the Zutons, Utah, We Are Scientists
2007	35	An Pierle & White Velvet, Architecture in Helsinki, Brakes, the Drones, Duke Special, the Earlies, the Electric Soft Parade, Friska Viljor, Gabriel Rios, Get Well Soon, Ghosts, Grand Island, Jamie T, Jan Delay and Disko No. 1, Johnossi, Kate Nash, Loney Dear, Maccabees, the Magic Numbers, Malajube, Naked Lunch, Navel, Patrick Watson, Paul Steel, Polarkreis 18, Ripchord, Serena Maneesh, Shout Out Louds, Spiritualized - Acoustic Mainlines, the View, Tunng, Two Gallants, Under Byen, Voxtrot, the Waterboys
2008	37	Alamo Race Track, Bernd Begemann, Bohren, der Club of Gore, Dagons, the Dodos, Editors, Fettes Brot, Fink, Finn, Flaming Lips, Fleet Foxes, Foals, Gisbert zu Knyphausen, Gravenhurst, Guillemots, Gutter Twins, the Heavy, Iron & Wine, Jack Penate, Jamie Lidell, Joan As Police Woman, Jumbo Jet, Kate Nash, Kula Shaker, Loney, Dear, Lykke Li, Maxïmo Park, Mintzkov, My Brightest Diamond, the National, Norman Palm, Okkervil River, Olafur Arnalds, Scott Matthew, the Kilians, White Lies, Yeasayer
2009	38	Alexander Tucker & the Decomposed Orchestra, Andrew Bird, Anna Ternheim, Athlete, Asaf Avidan & the Mojos, Blitzen Trapper, BLK JKS, Bon Iver, Broken Records, Colin Munroe, Dear Reader, Denison Witmer, Edward Sharpe & the Magnetic Zeros, Fettes Brot, Final Fantasy, Gravenhurst, Grizzly Bear, Health, Hjaltalín, I Like Trains, Little Boots, Loney, Dear, Mumford & Sons, Noah and the Whale, Palm Springs, Patrick Watson, Port O'Brien, the Irrepressibles, the Maccabees, the Soundtrack of Our Lives, the Temper Trap, the Thermals, the Vals, Tonfisch, William Fitzsimmons, Wildbirds & Peacedrums, Wintersleep, Woodpigeon
2010	45	Beach House, Bear in Heaven, Beirut, Blood Red Shoes, Chapel Club, Cymbals Eat Guitars, Dan Deacon, Daniel Benjamin, David Ford, Delphic, Detroit Social Club, Efterklang, Esben and the Witch, everything everything, Fanfarlo, Frightened Rabbit, Fyfe Dangerfield, Gary, Helgi Jonsson, I Blame Coco, Isbells, Junip, Laura Marling, Moss, Mumford & Sons, Nils Frahm, Philipp Poisel, Portugal. The Man, Post War Years, Rox, Seabear, Serena Maneesh, Sleepy Sun, Sophie Hunger, Stornoway, The Black Atlantic, The Low Anthem, The National, The Tallest Man on Earth, The Whale Watching Tour, The Young Rebel Set, Thus:Owls, Triggerfinger, Villagers, Wendy McNeill, Yeasayer
2011	52	206, Agnes Obel, Alex Winston, Alexi Murdoch, Anna Calvi, Ben Howard, Bodi Bill, Brandt Brauer Frick Ensemble, Codes In The Clouds, Coma, Dan Mangan, Destroyer, Dry The River, Explosions in the sky, Fleet Foxes, Gisbert zu Knyphausen, Golden Kanine, Hauschka, Isbells, James Blake, James Vincent McMorrow, Johnny Flynn, Josh T. Pearson, Julia Marcell, LaBrassBanda, Matthew and the Atlas, Miss Li, Moddi, Moss, My Brightest Diamond, Nils Frahm & Anne Müller, Okkervil River, Other Lives, Retro Stefson, Rival Consoles, Selah Sue, Socalled, SpringerParker, Steve Cradock, Suuns, The Antlers, The Avett Brothers, The Black Atlantic, The Low Anthem, The Wombats, Tim Isfort, Timber Timbre, Toy Horses, Warpaint, Wild Beasts, Wir sind Helden, Yuck
2012	52	A Winged Victory for the Sullen, Arthur Beatrice, Alcoholic Faith Mission, Alt-J, Apparat, Ben Howard, Bowerbirds, Boy & Bear, Charles Bradley, Chinawoman, Chris Garneau, Daan, Dan Mangan, Damien Jurado, Daughter, Der König Tanzt, Diagrams, EFFI, Emanuel and the Fear, Ewert and the Two Dragons, Grant Lee Buffalo, Guillemots, Here We Go Magic (ausgefallen), HELMUT, HONIG, Iceage, Jaga Jazzist, Jamie N Commons, Loney Dear, Megafaun, Niels Frevert, Nigel Wright, Oberhofer, Other Lives, Patrick Watson, Philipp Poisel, Skinny Lister, Steve Smyth, Team Me, The Afghan Whigs, The British Expeditionary Force, The Maccabees, The War on Drugs, Thees Uhlmann & Band, tUnE-yArDs, Two Door Cinema Club, Wendy McNeill, White Rabbits, Wilco, Willis Earl Beal, Wye Oak, Zulu Winter.
2013	55	Alabama Shakes, Allah-Las, Anna Von Hausswolff, Ásgeir Trausti, Balthazar, Bear's Den, Ben Caplan, Brandt Brauer Frick, Buke and Gase, Connan Mockasin, DakhaBrakha, Dan Croll, Death Letters, Denis Jones, Die Goldenen Zitronen, Douglas Dare, Duologue, Ebbot Lundberg and Trummor & Orgel, Efterklang, Florian Ostertag, Glen Hansard, Gold Panda, Half Moon Run, Ja, Panik, James, Jherek Bischoff, John Grant, Julia Holter, Käptn Peng & Die Tentakel von Delphi, Kettcar, Lee Fields & The Expressions, Local Natives, Lubomyr Melnyk, Luke Sital-Singh, METZ, Mikal Cronin, Orchestre Miniature In The Park, Owen Pallett, Pascal Finkenauer, Regina Spektor, Renate Granate, Rival Consoles, Rubik, Sam Amidon, Sophie Hunger, Stargaze with Andé de Ridder, Suuns, The Staves, The Strypes, These New Puritans, This Is The Kit, Tom Odell, Trümmer, Villagers, We Were Promised Jetpacks
2014	60	Alexi Murdoch, All The Luck In The World, Augustines, Benjamin Clementine, Bernhoft, Big Sixes, Big Ups, Black Lips, Boy & Bear, Cantus Domus, Carlos Cipa, Champs, Charity Children, Chet Faker, Conor Oberst, Connan Mockasin, Dawes, East Cameron Folkcore, Ed Harcourt, Enno Bunger, Ewert and The Two Dragons, Fat White Family, Fink, First Aid Kit, Grant Hart with stargaze, Honig, Hozier, Jeff Beadle, Jeffrey Lewis & the Jrams, Jonathan Toubin, Josh Record, Kurt Vile & the Violators, Kwabs, Lee Fields & The Expressions, Luke Sital-Singh, Manu Delago Handmade, Mariam The Believer, Money For Rope, My Brightest Diamond, Never Sol, Nick Mulvey, Ought, Patti Smith and her band, Poppy Ackroyd, Rhodes, Royal Blood, Ry X, Samantha Crain, Sam Smith, Speedy Ortiz, stargaze und André de Ridder, Stephan Eicher, Sun Kil Moon, The Acid, The Districts, The Mispers, The Slow Show, Tom The Lion, Trampled By Turtles, Wintergatan.
2015	61	Alcoholic Faith Mission, AnnenMayKantereit, Bear's Den, Benjamin Booker, Bernd Begemann & Die Befreiung, Big Sixes (UK), Bilderbuch, Cantus Domus (DE), Courtney Barnett, Dan Deacon, Delta Rae, dEUS, Die Sonne, DMA’S (AUS), Dotan, Douglas Dare, Family of the Year, Father John Misty, Frances (UK), Grandbrothers (DE), Heisskalt (DE), Ibeyi, Iceage, Intergalactic Lovers, Johann Sebastian Bach (Musik von ihm), Kapok (NL), Kae Tempest, Kiasmos, Kiko King & creativemaze (DE), Låpsley, Laura Marling, Liam Ó Maonlai & Peter O’Toole, Low Roar, Magnus, Mammút, Marcus Wiebusch, Mark Geary feat. Grainne Hunt, Nils Frahm, Olli Schulz, Public Service Broadcasting, Puts Marie (CH), Rae Morris, Savages, Soak, Someday Jacob, stargaze & André de Ridder, Steve Gunn, Sunset Sons, Terra Profonda, The Bronze Medal (UK), The Districts, The Slow Show, The War On Drugs, Tor Miller, Tora, Tour Of Tours, Viet Cong, Villagers, White Fence, Woods of Birnam (DE).
2016	54	Ala.ni, Albin Lee Meldau, Alex Vargas, Algiers, Arthur Beatrice, Ben Caplan & The Casual Smokers, The Besnard Lakes, Cantus Domus, Damien Rice, Daughter, Die Nerven, Drangsal, Ebbot Lundberg & The Indigo Children, Elias, Fai BaBa, Frost (Heiner), Frightened Rabbit, Heisskalt, Hothouse Flowers 3, Hubert von Goisern, GoGo Penguin, Glen Hansard, The Graveltones, Izzy Bizu, Jack Garratt, Jambinai, Jason Isbell, Julia Holter, Låpsley, Loney Dear, The Lytics, Martin Kohlstedt, Me + Marie, Melanie de Biasio, Michael Kiwanuka, Minor Victories, Money, Monobo Son, The Rad Trads, Rationale, Roo Panes, Samm Henshaw, Sara Hartman, Stargaze, The Strypes, St. Paul and The Broken Bones, Thees Uhlmann, The Vryll Society, This Is the Kit, Walking on Cars, Whitney, Wintergatan, Woman (DE), Yak.
2017	68	A Blaze of Feather (GB), AJIMAL (GB), Aldous Harding, Anna Meredith, AnnenMayKantereit, BADBADNOTGOOD, Bear's Den, Benjamin Clementine, Bilderbuch, Bergfilm (DE), Blaudzun, Cantus Domus (DE), Charlie Cunningham, Clueso, Conor Oberst, Daniel Brandt & Eternal Something (DE), Die Höchste Eisenbahn, Emmsjé Gauti, Faber, Get Well Soon, Giant Rooks, Hurray For The Riff Raff, Idles, Isaac Gracie, Joe Fox (GB), Joep Beving, John Joseph Brill (GB), Joseph J. Jones (GB), Julia Jacklin, Julie Byrne, Kae Tempest, Käptn Peng & Die Tentakel von Delphi (DE), Klangstof, Let's Eat Grandma, Lisa Hannigan, Little Hurricane, Loyle Carner, Luke Elliot, Mads Brauer (DK), Mahalia, Mammal Hands, Mammút, Mario Batkovic (CH), Martin Kohlstedt, Matthew and the Atlas (GB), Matt Maltese (GB), Mavi Phoenix (AT), ME + MARIE (DE), Messer (DE), Nick Waterhouse, Nothing, Parcels, Penguin Café (GB), Radical Face, Shame, Skinny Living (GB), Sløtface, The Afghan Whigs, The Amazons, The Inspector Cluzo (FR), The James Hunter Six (GB), Tom Grennan, TootArd, Von Wegen Lisbeth (DE), Voodoo Jürgens, White Wine (DE), WILDES (GB), Wolf Maahn (DE).
2018	75	Adam French (GB), Alabaster DePlume (GB), Amyl and The Sniffers, Aquilo, Ariel Pink, Astronautalis, Big Thief, Broen (NO), Canshaker Pi (NL), Cantus Domus (DE), Chad Lawson (US), Claus van Bebber (DE), Curtis Harding, Das Paradies (DE), Deerhoof, De Staat, Dirty Projectors, DJ St. Paul (NL), Fabrizio Cammarata (IT), Fink, Fortuna Ehrenfeld (DE), Gisbert zu Knyphausen, Hannah Williams & the Affirmations (GB), Hatis Noit (JP), Hope (DE), Housewives (GB), Infidelix (US), Jade Bird, Jake Bugg, Jenny Lewis, John Maus, Jordan Mackampa (GB), Julian Sartorius (CH), Kettcar, Kevin Morby, King Gizzard & The Lizard Wizard, Landlady (US), Lewsberg (NL), Lisa Hannigan, Love A (DE), Mario Batkovic & Friends (CH), Marius Bear (CH), Marlon Williams, Matteo Myderwyk (NL), Moncrieff (GB), Nilüfer Yanya, Nils Frahm, Philipp Poisel, Phoebe Bridgers, Protomartyr, Public Service Broadcasting, Reverend Beat-Man and the New Wave (CH), Rival Consoles, Rolling Blackouts Coastal Fever, Sampa the Great, Schnellertollermeier (CH), Seamus Fogarty, Seun Kuti & Egypt 80 (NG), Shortparis, Sleaford Mods, Someday Jacob (DE), stargaze & guests: Hip Hop Orchestral, Stefan Florian (IT), Tamino, Terra Profonda (HU), The Barr Brothers, The Inspector Cluzo (FR), The Lemon Twigs, The Lytics (CAN), The Slow Readers Club, Tinpan Orange, Tristan Brusch (DE), Villagers, White Wine (DE), Wood River (US)
2019	72	5K HD (AT), Alex the Astronaut, Alyona Alyona (UKR), Another Sky (GB), Balthazar, Barns Courtney, Black Midi, Blanco White (GB), Brandt Brauer Frick, Charlie Cunningham, Daughters, David Keenan (IRL), Dermot Kennedy, DJ St. Paul (NL), Durand Jones & The Indications (US), Dylan Cartlidge (GB), Elektro Guzzi (AT), Faraj Suleiman (PS), Father John Misty, Felix Kramer (AT), Flamingods, Fontaines D.C., Gerry Cinnamon, Gewalt (DE), Gurr (DE), Haiku Hands, IDLES, James Leg (US), Jeremy Dutcher, Jesse Mac Cormack, Julien Baker, Jungstötter (DE), Júníus Meyvant, Kadavar, Kat Frankie (AUS/DE), Keir (GB), Khruangbin, Kikagaku Moyo, Kirill Richter (RUS), Kuersche (DE), Lisa Morgenstern (DE), Loyle Carner, Maarja Nuut & Ruum (EST), Manuel Troller (CH), Michael Kiwanuka, Moka Efti Orchestra (DE), Money For Rope (AUS), opus m, Palace (GB), Patrick Watson, Pictures (DE), Puts Marie (CH), Rayland Baxter, Robocobra Quartet (IRL), Sea Girls, Shida Shahabi (SE), Soap&Skin (AT) with stargaze, Sophie Hunger, stargaze (EU), Stella Donnelly, Syml, Tangarine (NL), Tereza (DE), The Chats, The Districts, Thirsty Eyes (AT), Tony Carey, Town of Saints (NL), Wand, Whenyoung (IRL), Whitney, Woods of Birnam (DE)
2020	8	The 2020 festival had to be canceled due to the COVID-19 pandemic, instead there was a Live Streaming Festival with the following bands playing live from Dingle, Ireland: Cormac Begley, Lisa Hannigan, Peter Broderick, and the following band playing live from Live from Haldern: stargaze, Black Country, New Road, All The Luck In The World, Loney Dear
2021	14	Due to the ongoing COVID-19 pandemic, the festival took place from August 12 to 14, 2021 in a scaled-down form as walking tours & bike tours with concerts, marketplace concerts and church concerts, with the following artists performing: All the Luck in the World, Black Country, New Road, Cantus Domus, Catastrophe, Denise Chaila, Elias Bender Rønnenfelt, Fabian Simon & The Moon Machine, Jelly Cleaver, Kikagaku Moyo, Tereza, The Holy, Tim The Lion Tamer, Wu-Lu
2022	64	1000 Robota (DE), Aaron Smith (GB), Anaïs Mitchell (US), Anna Calvi (GB), Anne Müller (DE), BADBADNOTGOOD (CAN), Beatsteaks (DE), Bettina Bruns (DE), Black Country, New Road (GB), Black Midi (GB), Buntspecht (AT), Cantus Domus (DE), Chartreuse (GB), Curtis Harding (US), Dry Cleaning (GB), Eli Smart (US), Ellie Dixon (GB), Emilie Zoé (CH), Erdmöbel (DE), Eric Pfeil (DE), Etaoin (IRL), Ethan P. Flynn (GB), Extraliscio (IT), Famous (GB), Friedberg (AT/GB), Fruit Bats (US), Geese (US), Ghum (GB), Gilla Band (IRL), Glauque (BE), Grace Cummings (AUS), Gustaf (US), Hatis Noit (JP), Horse Lords (US), Husten (DE), Kae Tempest (GB), Kathryn Joseph (SCO), King Hannah (GB), Loney Dear (SE), Meskerem Mees (BE), Mid City (AUS), Nilüfer Yanya (GB), Parquet Courts (US), PITS feat. Jan Brauer (UKR/DE), Robocobra Quartet (IRL), Seratones (US), Shame (GB), Shortparis (RUS), Sinead O‘Brien (IRL), Sons of Kemet (GB), Sports Team (GB), Squid (GB), stargaze (EU), TEKE::TEKE (CAN), Terra Profonda (HU), The Lounge Society (GB), The Physics House Band (GB), Thumper (IRL), Thus Owls (CAN), Tom Jahn (DE), Vasco Brondi (IT), Wet Leg (GB), Wu-Lu (GB), Yard Act (GB)
2023	67	Adam French (GB), Alela Diane (US), Anushka Chkheidze (GE), Baby Volcano (CH/GT), Balming Tiger (KR), Bear's Den (GB), Ben Fox (GB), Bingo Fury (GB), Bipolar Feminin (AT), Bo Ningen (JP), Brockhoff (DE), Butch Kassidy (GB), Cantus Domus & Sven Helbig (DE), Childe (GB), Christian Lee Hutson (US), Courting (GB), Die Nerven (DE), Divorce (GB), Dobrawa Czocher (PL), Douglas Dare (GB), Dylan Cartlidge (GB), Emilie Zoé (CH), Famous (GB), Floodlights (AUS), Frankie and the Witch Fingers (US), Freddy Fischer & His Cosmic Rocktime Band (DE), Gaspar Claus (FR), Gemma Thompson (GB), Get Jealous (DE), Glauque (BE), Glen Hansard (IRL), Grainne Hunt (IRL), Gurriers (IRL), Hamish Hawk (SCO), Hania Rani (PL), James Bach (IT), Katy J Pearson (GB), Lanterns on the Lake (GB), Leoniden (DE), Lie Ning (DE), Lily Moore (GB), Low Cut Connie (US), Marina Herlop (ES), Mario Batkovic & The Broke Bankers (CH), Matthis Pascaud & Hugh Coltman (FR/UK), Susan O‘Neill (IRL), Nation of Language (US), Nnamdï (US), November Ultra (FR), Olivia Dean (GB), Omni Selassi (CH), Panic Shack (GB), Porridge Radio (GB), Protomartyr (US), Rolf Blumig (DE), Sorry (GB), Special Interest (US), Staples Jr Singers (US), Sylvie Kreusch (BE), The Comet Is Coming (GB), The Golden Dregs (GB), The Joy Hotel (SCO), The Mysterines (GB), Tom Odell (GB), Wendy McNeill (CAN), Willie J Healey (GB), Wunderhorse (GB)
2024	69	Angélica Garcia (US), Anna Ternheim (SE), Anushka Chkheidze (GE), Avalanche Kaito (BE), BC Camplight (US), Bel Cobain (GB), Berq (DE), Big Special (GB), Billie Marten (GB), Blanco White (GB), Büşra Kayıkçı (TR), Cantus Domus (DE), Chalk (IRL), Chilly Gonzales (CAN), Conchúr White (IRL), Crème Solaire (CH), Dave Okumu & 7 Generations (GB), Deadletter (GB), Debby Friday (CAN), Devendra Banhart (US), Dino Brandão (CH), Dog Race (GB), EBBB (GB), Elephant (NL), Faber (CH), Fat Dog (GB), Fitzgerald & Rimini (CH), Fontaines D.C. (IRL), GINA ÉTÉ (CH), Go-Jo (AUS), Gringo Mayer & die Kegelband (DE), Hana Stretton (AUS), Heisskalt (DE), Holly Macve (GB), HONESTY (GB), Jacob Alon (SCO), John Francis Flynn (IRL), Just Mustard (IRL), King Hannah (GB), Lanterns on the Lake (GB), Laura Masotto (IT), Loney Dear (SE), Los Sara Fontan (ES), Mary in the junkyard (GB), Mel D (CH), Mestizo (COL/GB), Michael Wollny Trio (DE), Mick Flannery (IRL), Molly Parden (US), Moon Hooch (US), Nichtseattle (DE), Obliecht (CH), Philipp Johann Thimm (DE), Picture Parlour (GB), Porcelain id (BE), Puma Blue (GB), Quirinello (DE), Roosmarijn (NL), Sam Akpro (GB), Sharktank (AT), Susan O‘Neill (IRL) & stargaze (EU), The Mary Wallopers (IRL), The Silhouettes Project (GB), Tramhaus (NL), UTO (FR), Villagers (IRL), YARD (IRL), Yard Act (GB)
2025	71	Alabaster DePlume (GB), Anika (GB/DE), Beaks (NL), Been Stellar (US), Being Dead (US), Ben E. Blame & Sugar Shame (DE), Bilk (GB), Bo Ningen (JP/GB), Brigitte Calls Me Baby (US), Cab Ellis (US), Cantus Domus (DE), Chartreuse (GB), Cliffords (IRL), CVC (GB), DJ Fett (DE), Dressed Like Boys (BE), ELLiS-D (GB), Endless Wellness (AT), Enji (MN), Extraliscio (IT), False Lefty (GB), Famous (GB), Fastmusic (GB), Flying Moon In Space (DE), Fovos Alif (GR), Frànçois & The Atlas Mountains (FR), Fuzzman (AT), Ganavya (US/IN), Goodwin (GB), Grandbrothers (DE/CH), Gurriers (IRL), Hannah Frances (US), Hauschka (DE), Heavy Lungs (GB), Infinity Song (US), J. Bernardt (BE), Jacoténe (AUS), Jake Bugg (GB), Joan As Police Woman (US), Josy Basar (DE), Lava Lovers (DE), Loney Dear (SE), Luise Weidehaas (DE), Man/Woman/Chainsaw (GB), Marlo Grosshardt (DE), Maruja (GB), Mermaid Chunky (GB), Mên An Tol (GB), NAFT (BE), One Sentence. Supervisor (CH), Overpass (GB), Pales (FR), Patrick Watson (CAN), Pem (GB), Porridge Radio (GB), Radio Free Alice (AUS), Rats On Rafts (NL), Sarah Julia (NL), Soft Loft (CH), Susan O‘Neill (IRL), Sylvie Kreusch (BE), Terra Profonda (HU/NL), The Backseat Lovers (US), To Athena (CH), TUKAN (BE), Vincent Moon's Live Cinéma (FR), Warhaus (BE), Warmduscher (GB), Welly (GB), Wu Lyf (GB), Zaho de Sagazan (FR)
2026	67	1000 Rabbits (DE), Abel Ghekiere (BE), Adult DVD (GB), André de Ridder (DE), Anushka Chkheidze & Robert Lippok (GE/DE), Asaf Avidan (ISR), Ben E. Blame (DE), Beurre (CH), Black Country, New Road (GB), Bleech 9:3 (IE), Boko Yout (SE), Bonnie "Prince" Billy (US), Cantus Domus (DE), Cardinals (IRL), Chéri Chéri (DE), Chest (GB), Chris Imler (DE), Clap Your Hands Say Yeah (US), Deki Alem (SE), Della (CN/GB), District Five (CH), DJ Fett (DE), Élie Zoé (CH), Erotic Secrets of Pompeii (GB), Fitzgerald & Rimini (CH), Flying Moon In Space (DE), Frankie and the Witch Fingers (US), Friko (US), Gans (GB), Geordie Greep (GB), Heidi Curtis (GB), Herbst (DE), Hex Girlfriend (GB), Horse Lords (US), Horsegirl (US), Iedereen (DE), Jacob Alon (SCO), Julia Effekt (DE), Kabeaushé (KE), La Sécurité (CAN), Loney Dear (SE), Lucy Kruger & The Lost Boys (ZA), Madra Salach (IRL), Marta Del Grandi (IT), Mount Palomar (GB), My New Band Believe (GB), Nathalie Froehlich (CH), Naïka (US/FR), Nectar Woode (GB), Sara Parkman (SE), Silver Gore (DE), Sportfreunde Stiller (DE), Sugar Shame (DE), Susan O‘Neill (IRL), The 113 (GB), The Itch (GB), The Love Buzz (IRL), The Notwist (DE), The Sick Man Of Europe (DE), Tyler Ballgame (US), Ugly (GB), Wallners (AT), Wellbehaved (GB), Westside Cowboy (GB), Woods of Birnam (DE), Woom (GB), Yana Couto (PL)

== Haldern Pop Bar ==
When a pub was to be abandoned in the middle of the village, a concept for an off-day hotel was developed. Since 2009, bands who have a day off between two gigs get free board and lodging in exchange for an evening concert "on a donation basis" at the Haldern Pop Bar. Besides unknown new artists who are just starting their careers, well-known bands such as Courtney Barnett or Nada Surf have already performed in the Pop Bar. Also bigger artists like George Ezra or Orville Peck have been performing here before their world career started. The venue also houses the event agency Raum 3, which organizes the festival, the Haldern Pop Recordings label, Haldern Pop Booking agency and the Haldern Pop Shop record store, among others, so that a close cooperation is possible.

== Record label ==
In 1999, the idea came up to release a sampler with music by the bands of the year. This led to the founding of the record label "Haldern Pop Recordings", which as yet released works of e.g. William Fitzsimmons, Giant Rooks, The Soundtrack Of Our Lives and Low Cut Connie.

== Booking agency ==
In 2019, Haldern Pop founded a booking agency at the lower rhine area. The artists represented there include Mid City, Moon Hooch, Thirsty Eyes, and James Leg from Black Diamond Heavies
