= Octav Chelaru =

Romanian film director and screenwriter (born 1991)

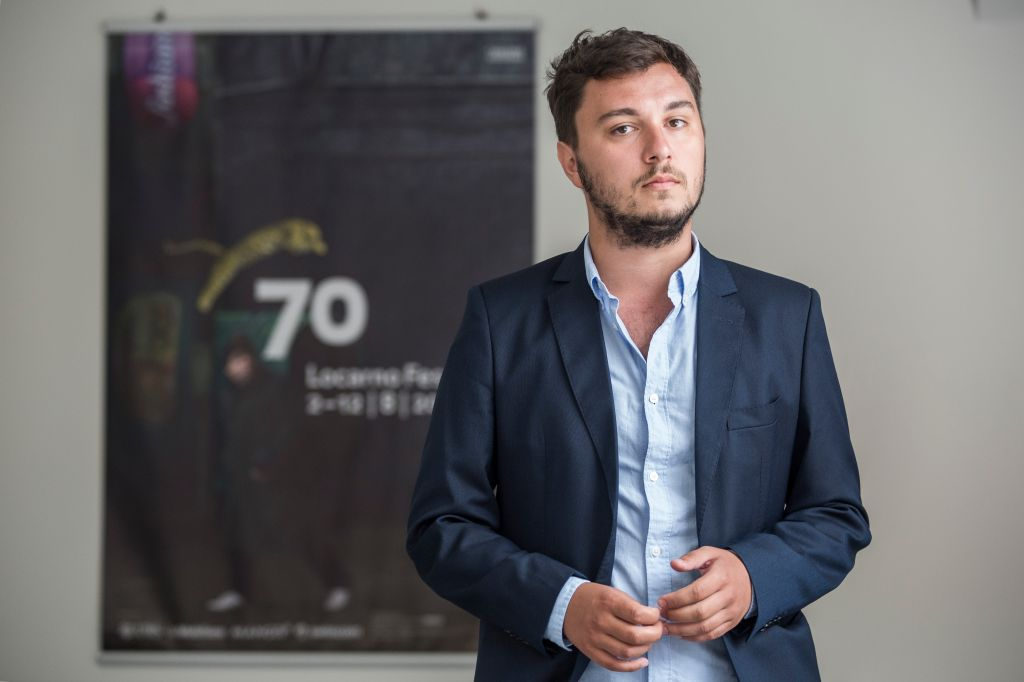
- Octav Chelaru at Locarno Film Festival, before the premiere of "Black Clothes"
- Born: September 30, 1991 (age 35); Piatra Neamț, Neamț County, Romania
- Other name: Octavian-Dumitru Chelaru
- Education: Alexandru Ioan Cuza University
- Occupations: film director; screenwriter
- Notable work: A Higher Law (2021), The Parallel State (2020), Black Clothes (2017)

Octav Chelaru (born 30 September 1991) is a Romanian film director and screenwriter. He wrote and directed the short films Black Clothes (2017) and The Parallel State (2020) which both premiered in Pardi di Domani at Locarno Festival. In 2021, he wrote and directed the feature film A Higher Law.

== Debut film ==
His feature film directorial debut called A Higher Law, a Romanian-German-Serbian co-production starring Mălina Manovici and Alexandru Papadopol, was developed for five years at various film workshops, screenwriting residencies and co-production markets.

In 2017, the project was selected at the Villa Kult Residency in Berlin, the Transilvania Pitch Stop in Cluj-Napoca and the Pustnik Screenwriters' Residency. In 2018, it went to Midpoint Feature Launch (Czech Republic, Serbia, Italy), to Less is More Development Programme (France, Poland, Romania), to the CineLink Workshop and Co-production Market at the Sarajevo Film Festival and to the International Project Discovery Forum at the Los Angeles Greek Film Festival. Later in the process, it was selected to the 2019 APostLab Post Production Workshop in Bucharest, the 2020 Work in Progress of the Les Films de Cannes à Bucarest, the 2021 Closed Screenings of the Transilvania International Film Festival and the 2021 First Cut+ Lab at the Trieste Film Festival.

The film had the World premiere at the 62nd edition of the Thessaloniki International Film Festival and the Asian premiere at the 52nd International Film Festival of India. Later, it was selected at the 49th edition of the Film Fest Ghent and the 26th edition of the International Film Festival of Kerala.

In Romania, A Higher Law premiered in the Official Competition of the 21st edition of the Transilvania International Film Festival. After sold-out screenings in Cluj-Napoca and positive reviews, previews of the film were screened all over the country: in Timișoara at the Ceau, Cinema! Film Festival and Cinema Victoria, in Sibiu at the TIFF Sibiu and Centrul Cultural “Ion Besoiu”, in Iași at the Serile Filmului Românesc, in Cluj-Napoca at Cinema Victoria, in Bucharest at Cinema Elvire Popesco, at Grădina cu Filme and at the National Theatre Bucharest during Noaptea Albă a Filmului Românesc, in the Danube Delta at the Anonimul International Independent Film Festival, in Alba-Iulia at the Alba Iulia Music & Film Festival, in Oradea at the TIFF Oradea, in Arad at Cinema Arta, in Satu Mare County at the Caravana Filmelor TIFF Unlimited, in Constanța at the Sunscreen Film & Arts Festival, in Piatra Neamț at Cinema Mon Amour, in Brașov at Centrul Cultural Reduta, in Buzău at Buzău International Arts Festival where it won the Best Film Award and in the neighbouring Chișinău at Zilele Filmului Românesc.

The film had the Gala Premiere on 29 August 2022, at the Romanian Athenaeum and was released in cinemas nationwide on 9 September 2022.

A Higher Law was released in the Cinema City network (Arad, Bacău, Bucharest, Brașov, Brăila, Cluj-Napoca, Constanța, Iași, Ploiești, Râmnicu Vâlcea, Suceava, Târgu Mureș and Timișoara). Other cinemas around the country screened the film, as follows: in Bucharest (Cineplexx Băneasa, Hollywood Multiplex, Cinema Elvire Popesco, Cinema Europa, Cinema Muzeul Țăranului Român, Cinema Movieplex, Cinema Union), Cluj-Napoca (Cinema Arta, Cinema Florin Piersic, Cinema Victoria), Timișoara (Cinema Victoria), Iași (Cinema Ateneu), Arad (Cinema Arta), Sibiu (Cinegold, Cinema Arta), Craiova (Cinema Patria), Piatra Neamț (Cinema Mon Amour), Pitești (Cinema Trivale), Focșani (Sala Balada), Miercurea-Ciuc (Cinema Csíki Mozi), Sfântu Gheorghe (Cinema Arta - Művész Mozi), Slobozia (Casa Municipală de Cultură "Nicolae Rotaru") and Odobești (Casa de Cultură).

The film was nominated for 8 categories at the 2023 edition of the Gopo Awards, the Romanian equivalent of the Spain's Goya Awards or the France's César Awards. Octav Chelaru was nominated for Best Debut Film and Best Screenplay, Mălina Manovici for Best Actress in a Leading Role, Sergiu Smerea for Best Supporting Actor, Barbu Bălășoiu for Best Cinematography, Dragoș Apetri for Best Editing, Martin Kohlstedt for Best Original Music, and the sound team (Johannes Doberenz - sound recordist, Sebastian Schmidt - sound designer, Christoph Wieczorek - re-recording mixer) for Best Sound.

In 2023, the film had its US premiere at 9th edition of The Romanian Film Festival Seattle, had its premiere in Germany at the Luchs Kino in Halle (Saale), was selected in the 7th edition of the Šumadijski internacionalni filmski festival in Kragujevac, Serbia, was selected in the 13th edition of the Romanian Film Festival in Spain, which screened the film in multiple cities around the country, including Madrid, Barcelona, Valencia, Sevilla, Oviedo, Zaragoza, Santander and Palma de Mallorca and it was selected in Le Giornate del Cinema Rumeno in Rome, Italy. Also, it won the Special Mention for the Producer of the Year at Independent Producers Indie Film Festival (IPIFF).

== Future projects ==
One of his future feature film projects has the working title Rara Avis and it was developed at the Pustnik Screenwriters' Residency. At the 2023 edition of the Transilvania International Film Festival, the project was awarded the Alex. Leo Șerban Scholarship Special Mention.

== Filmography ==
| Year | Film | Credited as | | | Notes |
| Year | Film | Director | Screenwriter | Producer | Notes |
|---|---|---|---|---|---|
| 2014 | False Positive | Yes | Yes | Yes | Short Film |
| 2015 | Occupied | Yes | Yes | Yes | Short Film |
| 2015 | Private Party | Yes | Yes | Yes | Short Film |
| 2017 | Black Clothes | Yes | Yes | | Short Film; Premiered at Locarno Festival |
| 2020 | The Parallel State | Yes | Yes | | Short Film; Premiered at Locarno Festival |
| 2021 | A Higher Law | Yes | Yes | | Debut Feature Film; Premiered at 62nd Thessaloniki International Film Festival; National Premiere at 21st Transilvania International Film Festival — In Competition; Selected at 52nd International Film Festival of India, 49th Film Fest Ghent, 26th International Film Festival of Kerala |
| 2024 | Unmerry Christmas | Yes | Yes | Yes | Short Film |
| 2025 | The Crying Girl | Yes | Yes | Yes | Short Film; National Premiere at 24th Transilvania International Film Festival — In Competition |
| 2027 | Archangel | Yes | Yes | Yes | Sophomore feature |
