= Klangstof =

Dutch indie rock band

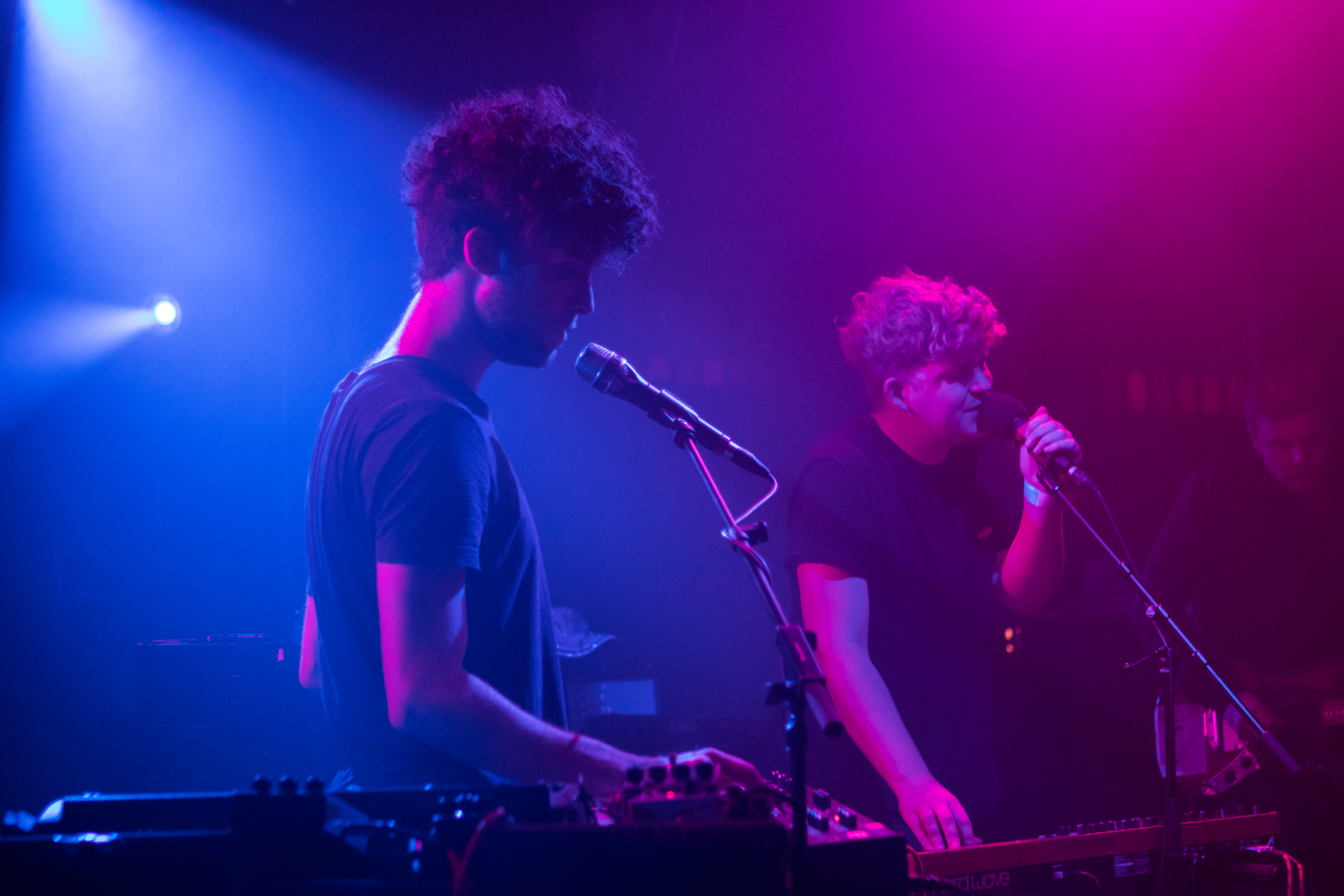
- Klangstof at Haldern Pop Festival 2017.

Background information
- Origin: Amsterdam, Netherlands
- Genres: Indie Rock; Electronic; Noise pop; Post-Rock
- Years active: 2015–present
- Label: Mind of a Genius
- Members: Koen van de Wardt; Wannes Salome; Erik Buschmann
- Past members: Jobo Engh; Jun Villanueva
- Website: klangstof.com

Klangstof is a Dutch indie rock band composed of Koen van de Wardt, Wannes Salome and Erik Buschmann. The band is based in Amsterdam and signed to Mind of a Genius.

== History ==
Koen van de Wardt (born 30 May 1992) grew up in a remote area in Norway, where he taught himself how to play and record. After moving to Amsterdam in 2013 to join Dutch indie band Moss, he also started releasing music as Klangstof.

Klangstof was confirmed to play Coachella 2017 as the first Dutch band ever to play the festival.

== Name ==
Klangstof is a combination of the Norwegian word for "reverb" ("Klang"), and the Dutch word for "dust", "substance" or "fabric"("Stof").

== Discography ==
Studio albums:

- Close Eyes To Exit (2016)
- The Noise You Make Is Silent (2020)
- Godspeed to the Freaks (2022)

The tracks Hostage, We are your receiver, Amansworld and Island off their debut record were released as singles.

Extended Plays:

- Everest (2017)
- Ocean View (2022)

The track Ocean View was released as a single.

== Gallery ==
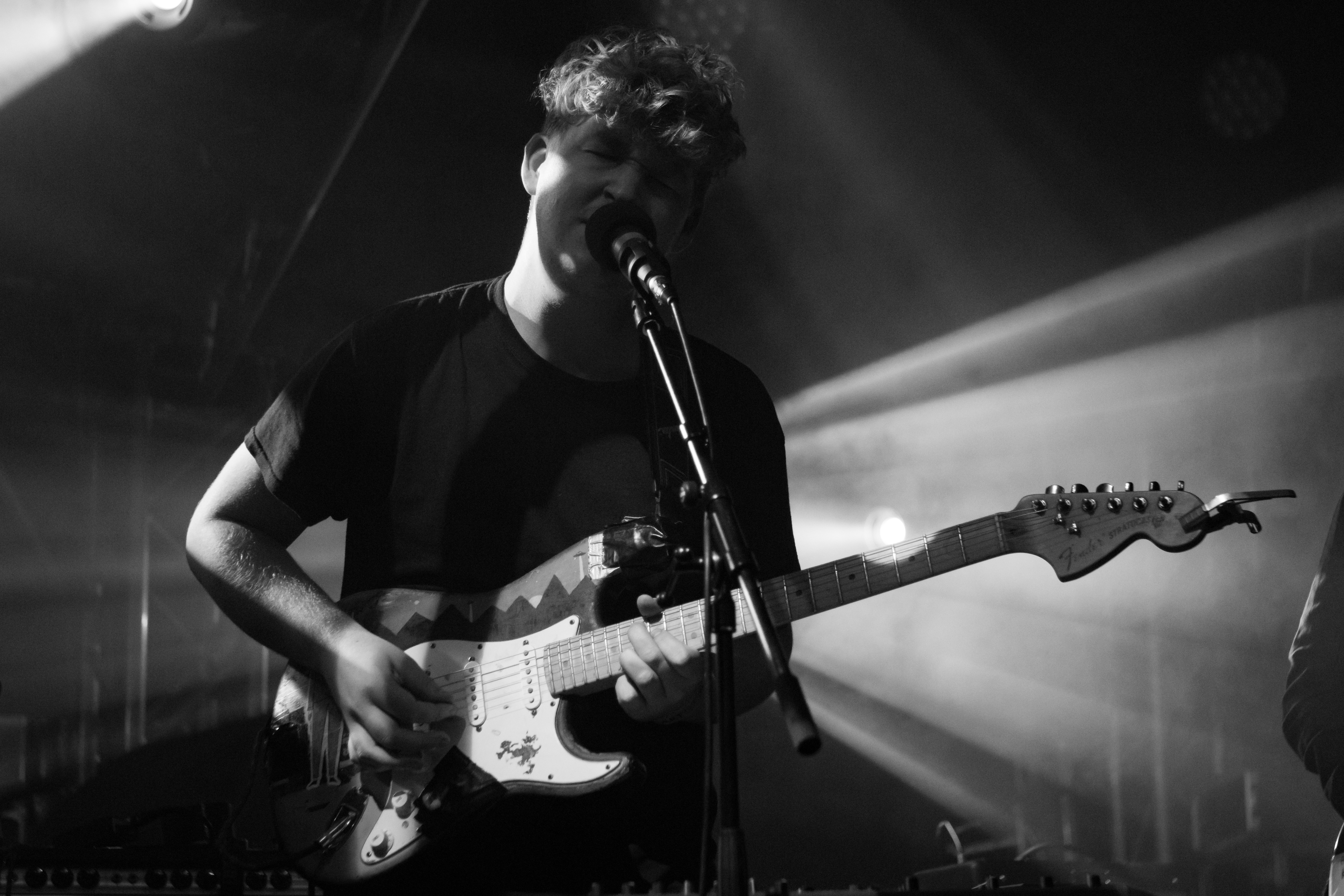
Koen van de Wardt

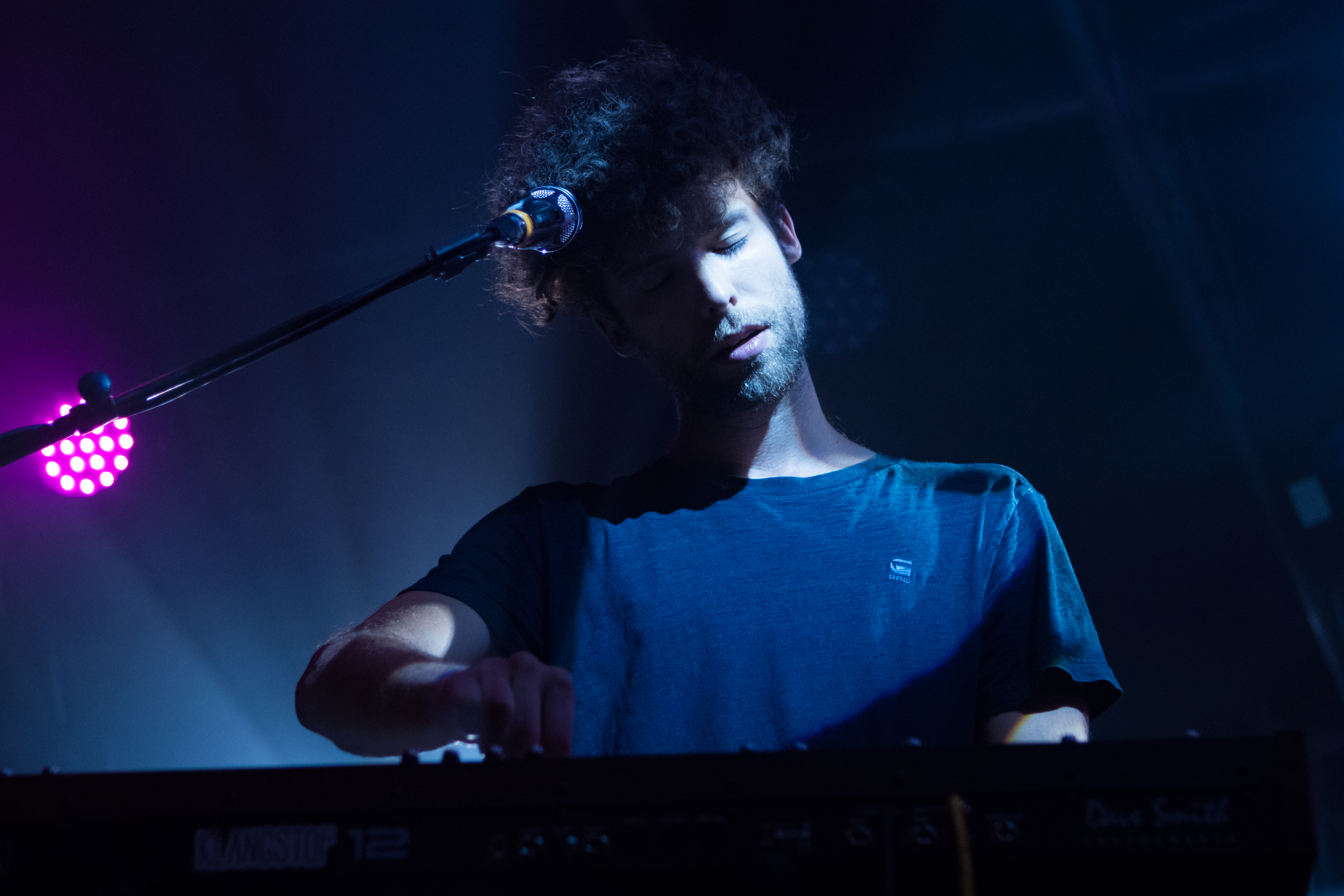
Wannes Salome

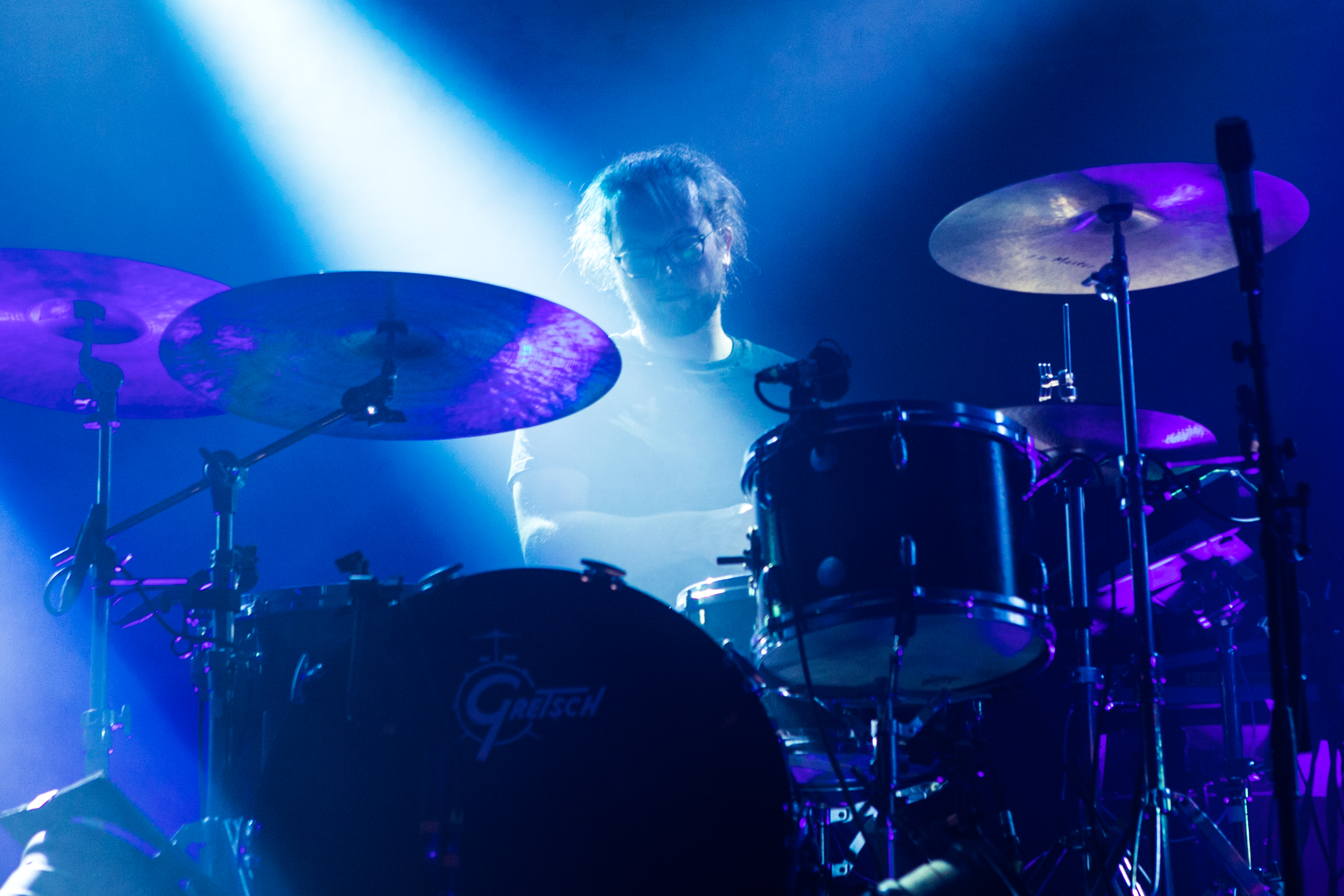
Erik Buschmann
