= Nigel Wright (musician) =

American singer-songwriter/musician (born 1993)

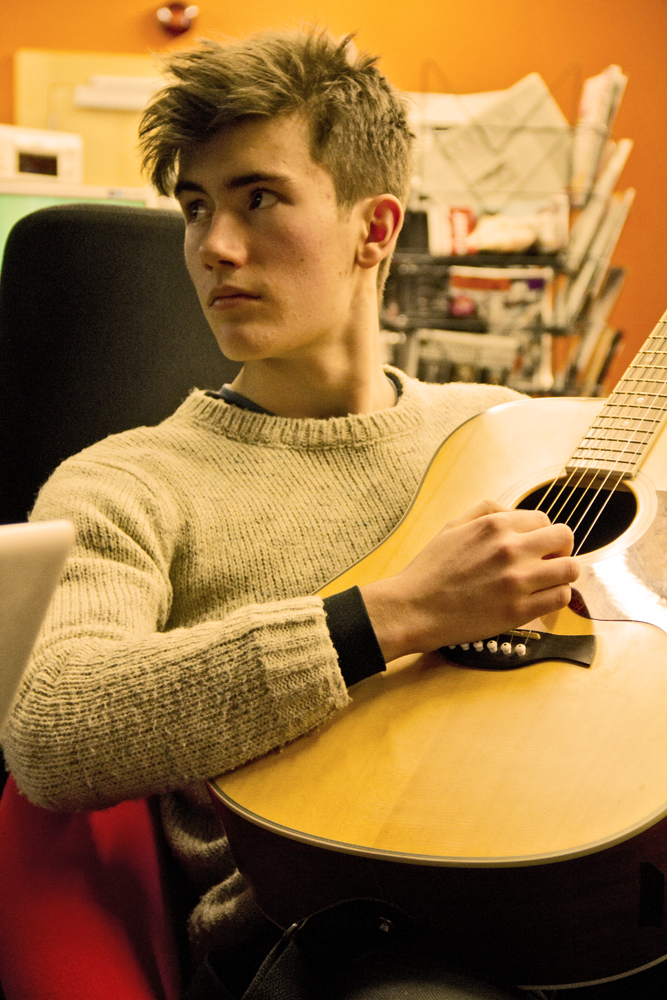
- Nigel Wright live at Radio DRS-Virus Switzerland

Background information
- Born: Nigel Wright; September 14, 1993 (age 32)
- Origin: Blue Ridge Mountains, Georgia (U.S. state)
- Genres: folk, indie pop, open folk
- Occupation: Singer-songwriter
- Instruments: Vocals, guitar, piano
- Members: Nigel Wright

Nigel Wright (born September 14, 1993) is an American singer-songwriter and musician whose instruments include guitar, piano and percussion.

== Early life ==
Nigel Wright was born on September 14, 1993, in Jasper, Georgia.Before beginning to write folk music at the age of 16, Nigel Wright's native state of Georgia offered him its full range of natural environment. He split his childhood years between the low country, where the Savannah River merges with the coastal marsh, and in the Georgia segment of the Appalachian called the Blue Ridge Mountains

== Career ==
Nigel was born to Whittier and Erin Wright, both professional artists. The Wrights acquaintances included professional artists, writers, and musicians. As an only child, schooled at home, and in the regular presence of working artists, Nigel Wright came to songwriting with a background of individualism and exploration. Though trained on piano, Wright began experimenting with guitar, using improvisation and alternate tunings.

While the southern United States is known for its heritage of storytelling, Wright felt drawn to abstraction and intuition in his lyrics, saying, "You feel like you're not on earth anymore when you're swimming, and when you're weightless– and an otherworldly quality is something I think that weightlessness and songwriting have in common. Those first few moments when you start putting lyrics you came up with days ago while you were walking outside– and they just merge perfectly with some chords you just happen to stumble across."

Butterfly Records (Est. 2011) discovered Nigel Wright's work in 2011 on SoundCloud. According to the record label, Wright's album "Millfoil", recorded at his home studio, displayed the sixteen-year-old's mature grasp of musical structures, verse, and vocalization.

Nigel played his European premiere at the Haldern Pop Bar January 19, 2012, supporting Nada Surf for the occasion of the 20 years anniversary of the German INTRO magazine. On February 4, 2012, he played the One of a Million Festival at Baden/Switzerland.

Among the Nigel Wright festival confirmations for the 2012 European summer season is Haldern Pop Festival, winner Best Small Festival! in Europe.

Video clips of Nigel Wright are screened on VIVA, MTV, Rolling Stone and also Putpat.

== Discography ==
=== Albums ===
- Millfoil (2010)
- Millfoil (Rerelease 2012)
- Valasketh (2014)

=== Extended plays ===
- Follow Me Down to My Murky River (2012)

=== Singles ===
- Anna/Clear Eyed Plans (2012)
- By Smaller Things Than Stones (2012)
- Light the Catch / Catch the Light (2017)
