= Yana Couto =

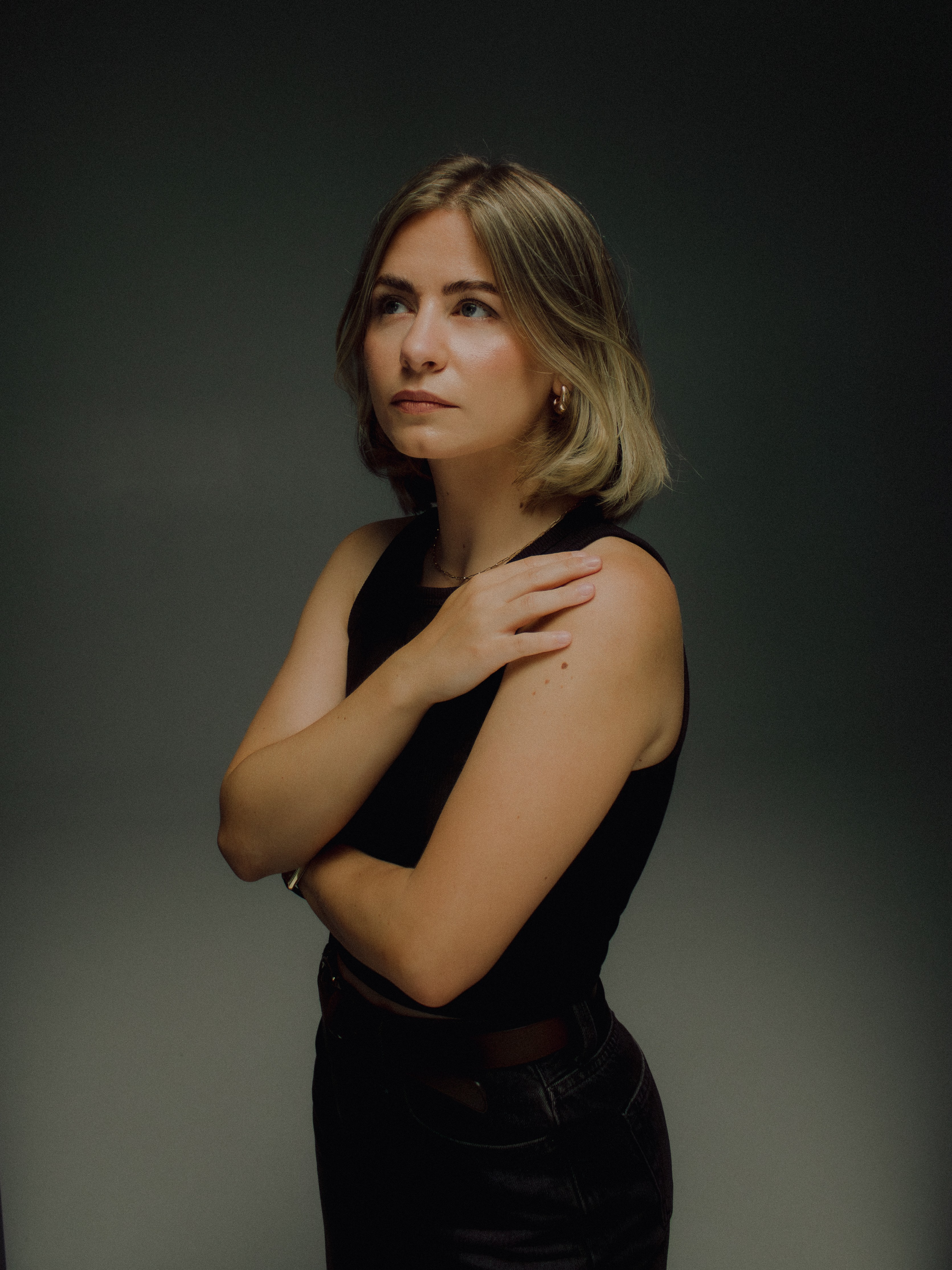

Background information
- Born: Zuzanna Matuszewska; 1992 (age 33–34); Poland
- Genres: Neoclassical, ambient, contemporary classical
- Occupations: Composer, pianist, music producer
- Instruments: Piano, synthesizers
- Years active: 2014–present
- Website: yanacouto.com

Yana Couto (born Zuzanna Matuszewska) is a Polish composer, pianist, and music producer.

== Early life and education ==
Yana Couto was born in Poznań, Poland and began playing the piano at the age of six, a choice she made when her parents asked her to choose between pursuing sports or music. It was through her early piano education that she began transforming her feelings into musical compositions.

She pursued formal education in composition and music theory, graduating from the FCUM in Warsaw and the Academy of Music in Poznan. During her academic years, she was mentored by notable Polish composers, including Anna Ignatowicz-Glińska, Krzesimir Dębski, and Janusz Stalmierski .

== Career ==
After several years of musical discovery and improvisation, Couto released her debut solo piano album, Colors, in 2014, featuring nine original compositions. This was followed a year later by the five-track instrumental EP Cities (2015). Following these initial releases, she began exploring various musical genres and instrumentations, including ensemble music and orchestral works.

In 2021, she released her first piano book featuring sheet music from her debut album. In 2022, she released her sophomore album, The Great Hope. The album was composed and recorded in the midst of the COVID-19 pandemic, recorded in her living room on a Bruno Sommerfeld piano.

Couto's international profile grew significantly as her streaming numbers reached over 25 million plays, leading to her selection as a global ambassador for Spotify's EQUAL campaign.

Beyond solo piano works, Couto composes for visual media, theater, and independent projects. She provided the original score for a theater play and collaborated with producer OS.SO on the concept album Isolde. In 2025 she embarked on a European tour. In 2026, Yana Couto performed at ESNS Eurosonic festival and Haldern Pop Festival in Germany.

== Musical style ==
Yana Couto's style is often described as a delicate intersection of minimalism, Slavic romanticism, and gentleness. Her compositions often utilize acoustic instruments, synthesizers, and layered vocals to create sonic landscapes.

== Discography ==
=== Studio albums ===
- Colors (2014)
- The Great Hope (2022)
- Isolde – Collaborative concept album with OS.SO (2025)

=== Extended plays ===
- Cities (2015)

=== Selected singles and collaborations ===
- "Ottilia"
- "Darklight" (with Yan Springett)
- "Tam słońce, gdzie my (Piano Version)" (with Wiktor Dyduła)
- "Dawn" (with OS.SO)
- "Dusk" (with OS.SO and Banduragirl)
- "Zatańczmy jeszcze" (with SOFIA)

== See also ==
- List of ambient music artists
- Music of Poland
