= Hana Stretton =

Australian singer-songwriter (born 1994)

Background information
- Also known as: Honey Stretton
- Born: Hana Williams; 14 April 1994 (age 32); Canberra, Australia
- Genres: Folk; ambient; lo-fi
- Years active: 2016–present
- Labels: P.W. Elverum & Sun
- Website: www.hanastretton.com

Hana Williams (born 14 April 1994), also known as Hana Stretton, is a British-Australian singer-songwriter. In 2016, her debut single, "The Thrill of Loneliness", went viral. She released her debut studio album, Soon, in 2023, and followed it in 2026 with tiarn. Her music has been distributed by Phil Elverum's label P.W. Elverum & Sun.

== Early life ==
Hana Williams was born on 14 April 1994, in Canberra, Australia. Her family had lived in Tokyo prior to her birth. Her father is a journalist. Her sister, Amelia Lander, has directed some of Stretton's music videos.

== Career ==
Stretton released her debut single, "The Thrill of Loneliness", which went viral, in 2016. At this time, she released music under the alias Honey Stretton. She followed it up with the EP Wail that same year. Stretton also had a burner account on SoundCloud called Nora's Bin that contained unfinished demos.

Stretton released her debut studio album, Soon, on 24 January 2023. It contained themes of connection and nature. She recorded the album alone on a farm during the 2019–20 Australian bushfire season. The COVID-19 pandemic soon hit after. During her time alone, she recorded nearly every day with a nylon string guitar and other instruments borrowed from her neighbour. In 2024, Phil Elverum reissued the album on his label P.W. Elverum & Sun. Stretton then supported Elverum's project Mount Eerie on his 2025 North American tour.

Her second album, tiarn, was released on 7 August 2026. It was self-recorded while Stretton lived at the coast and observed the winter migration of whales and drew from ecological grief and life by the ocean; the album's title, meaning "landholder", was named after a friend she had met while living there. The album was also influenced by her family's home footage taken from a camera they had bought while living in Japan in 1991.

== Influences and artistry ==
Stretton makes use of both classical and electronic compositions, as used on her album Soon. Her music has been described as "ambient folk" and musique concrète, making use of field recordings. Stretton's music has been compared to that of Grouper, William Basinski, Konradsen, and Claire Rousay.

== Discography ==
=== Studio albums ===
| Title | Details |
|---|---|
| Soon | Released: 24 January 2023; Label: Self-released, P.W. Elverum & Sun (reissue); Formats: LP, cassette, digital download |
| tiarn | Released: 7 August 2026; Label: Self-released, P.W. Elverum & Sun; Formats: LP, digital download |

=== Extended plays ===
| Title | Details |
|---|---|
| Wail | Released: 30 October 2016; Label: Self-released; Formats: Digital download |

=== Singles ===
| Title | Year | Album |
|---|---|---|
| "The Thrill of Loneliness" | 2016 | Non-album single |
| "Stove" | 2026 | tiarn |
| "Before This" | 2026 | tiarn |
| "From" | 2026 | tiarn |
