= The Slow Show =

British indie pop band

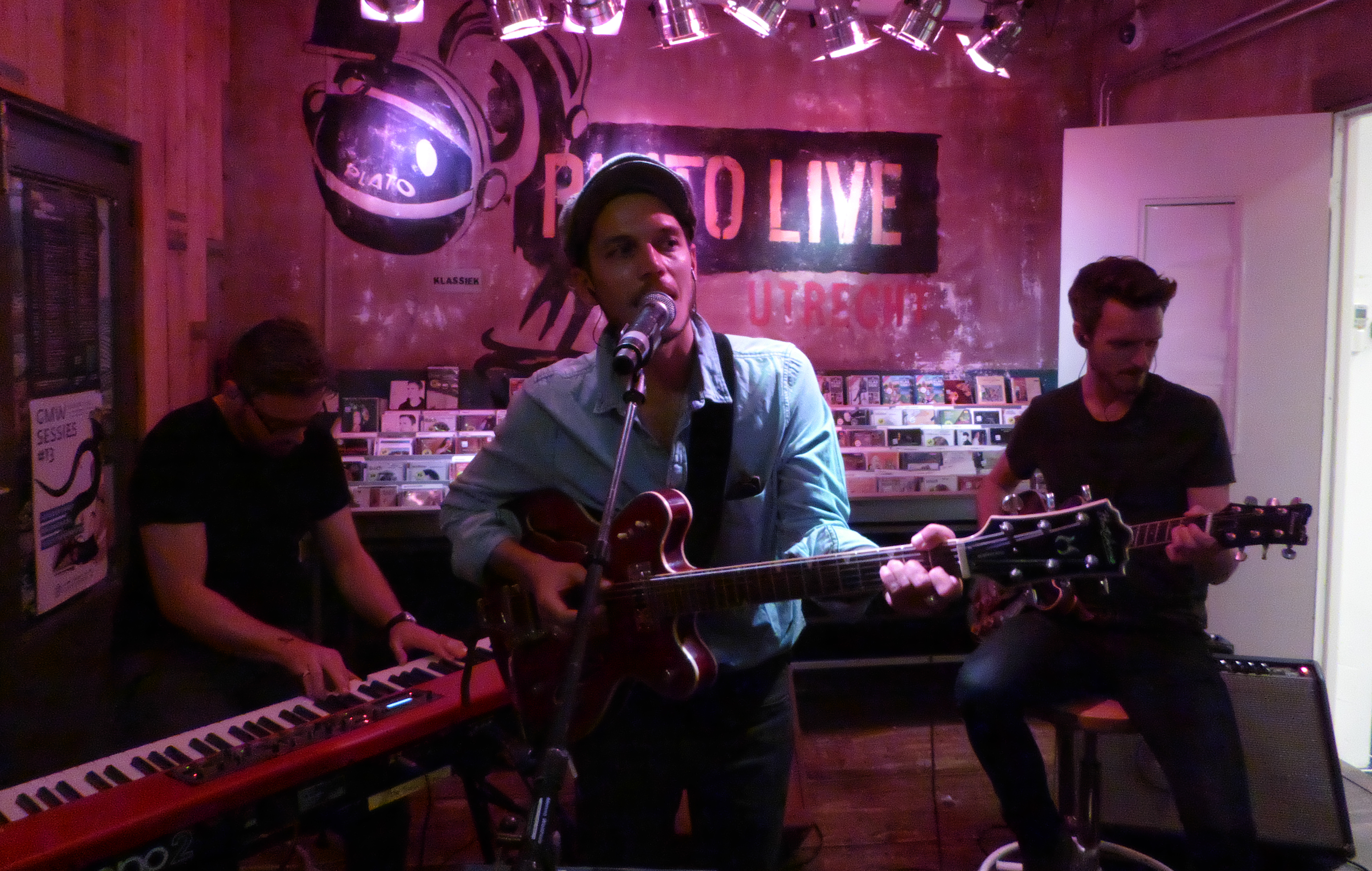
- The Slow Show in Utrecht (2016)

Background information
- Origin: Manchester, United Kingdom
- Genres: Indie pop
- Years active: 2010–present
- Label: Haldern Pop Recordings
- Members: Rob Goodwin; Frederik 't Kindt; Joel Byrne-McCullough; Chris Hough
- Past members: James Longden
- Website: theslowshow.co.uk

The Slow Show is a British indie pop band, formed in Manchester, UK in 2010. Their music has been described as "minimalist but epic numbers steeped in atmospheric sonic landscapes" with singer Rob Goodwin's "croaky baritone" as a feature that stands out. They have been compared to the likes of Elbow, The National or Tindersticks.

Outside of the UK, they are best known in Germany – where their previous record label Haldern Pop Recordings was based – as well as the Netherlands, Belgium and Switzerland, based on the number of concerts played in each country. Their current record label is PIAS Recordings.

== History ==
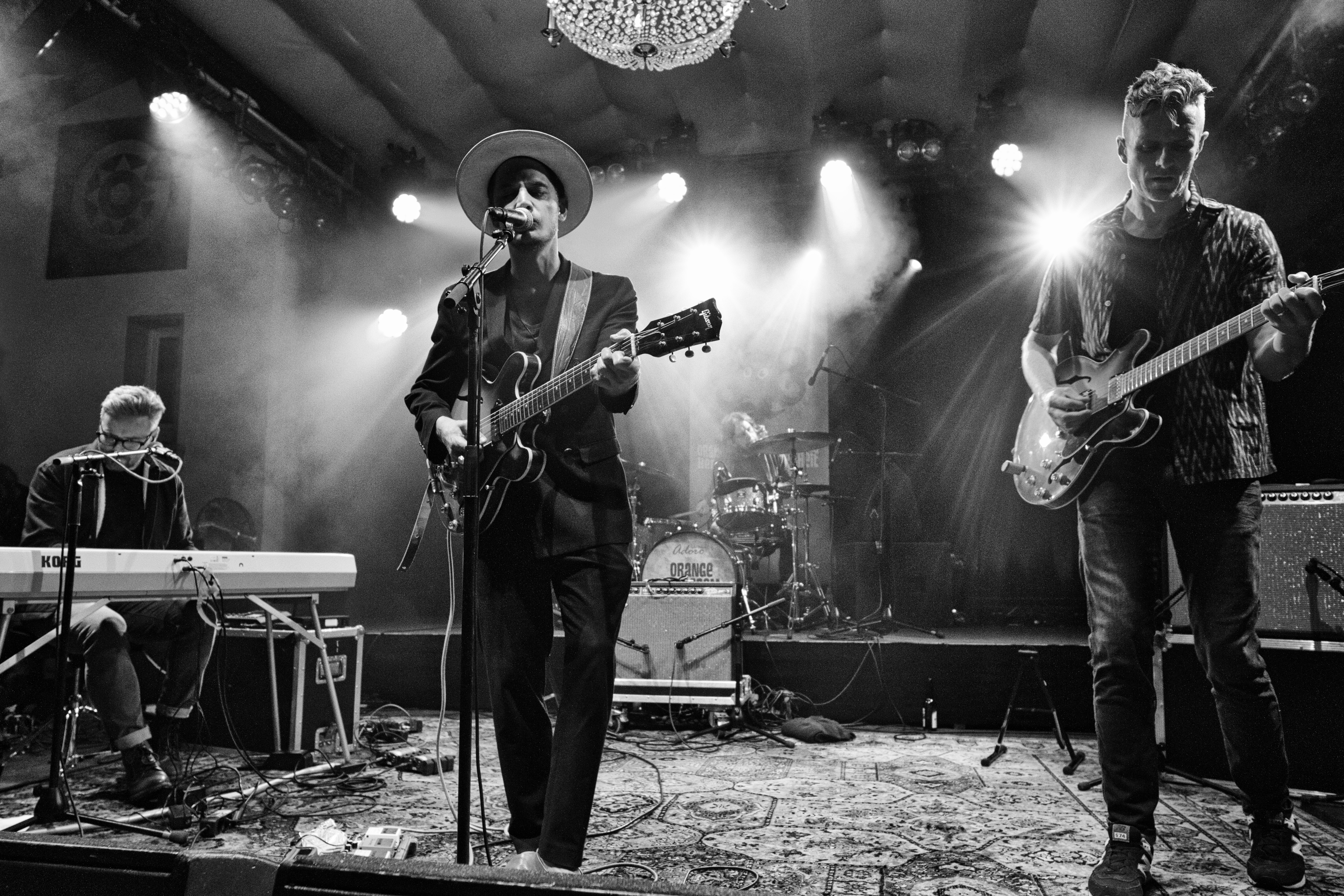
Performing at Orange Blossom Special Festival 2024

The band was founded in 2010 when keyboardist and producer Fred Kindt helped launch Manchester studio Blueprint, where Elbow and Justin Timberlake have recorded. He met Rob Goodwin, who at the time was playing guitar for another band, "bonding over their love of orchestras, brass bands and film music".

The name of the band has often been linked to a song by the American band The National of the same name. This, however, was supposedly not the inspiration for the name, but rather drummer Chris Hough's "love of show-stopping acts and the band’s determination not to make hurried music".

== Discography ==
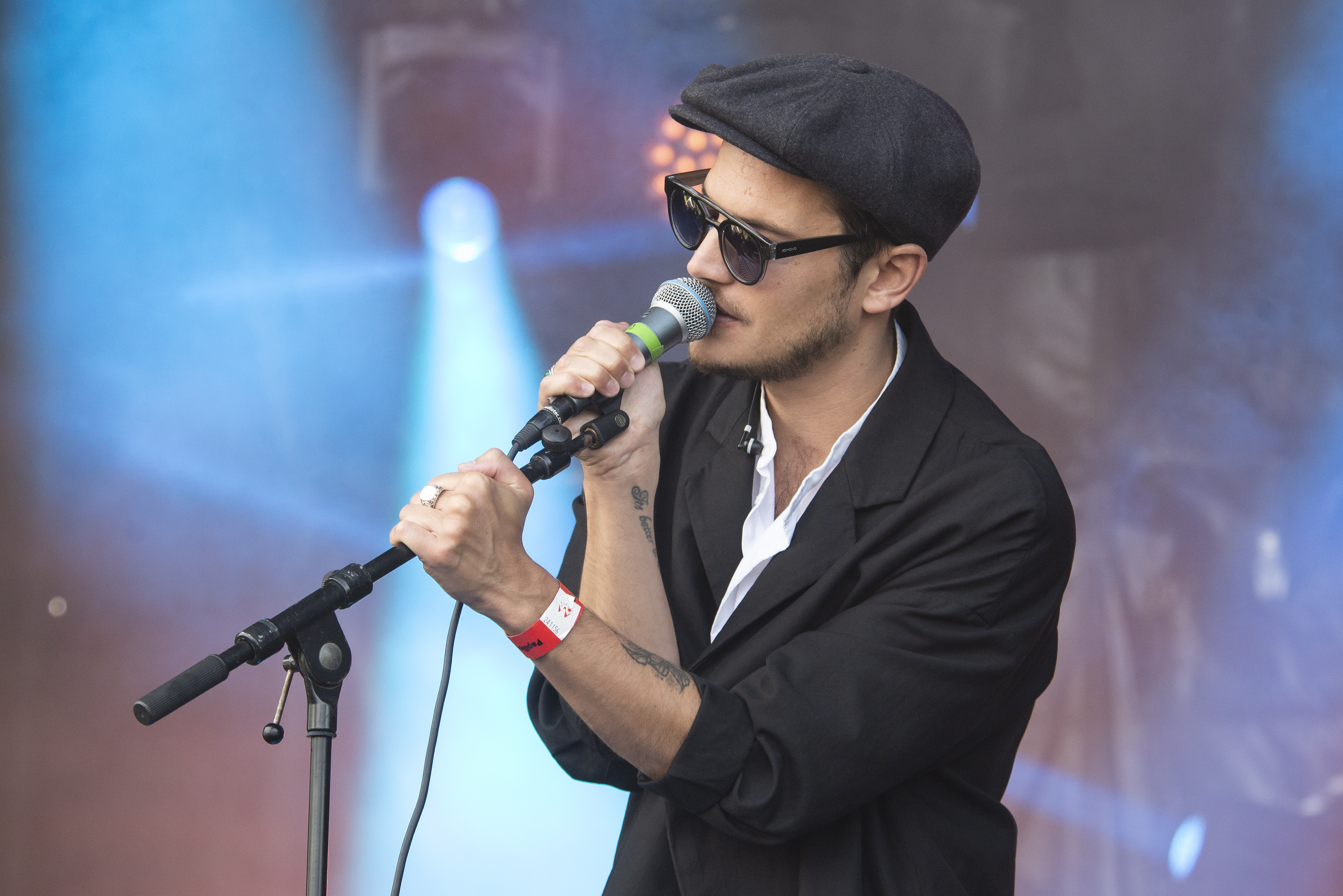
Concert at a French festival, June 2019

Before releasing their first full-length album, The Slow Show had released two EPs, Midnight Waltz (2011) and Brother (2012). The band released their debut album, titled White Water, in 2015. Their second album, Dream Darling, followed a year later.

On 6 February 2019, they released the single "Sharp Scratch".

On 26 October 2021 they released "Blinking", taken from their fourth album Still Life, which was released on 4 February 2022.

=== Album ===
- White Water (2015)
- Dream Darling (2016)
- Lust and Learn (2019)
- Still Life (2022)
- Subtle Love (2023)

=== EP ===
- Midnight Waltz (2011)
- Brother (2012)
