= Charlie Cunningham (musician) =

English musician (born 1984)

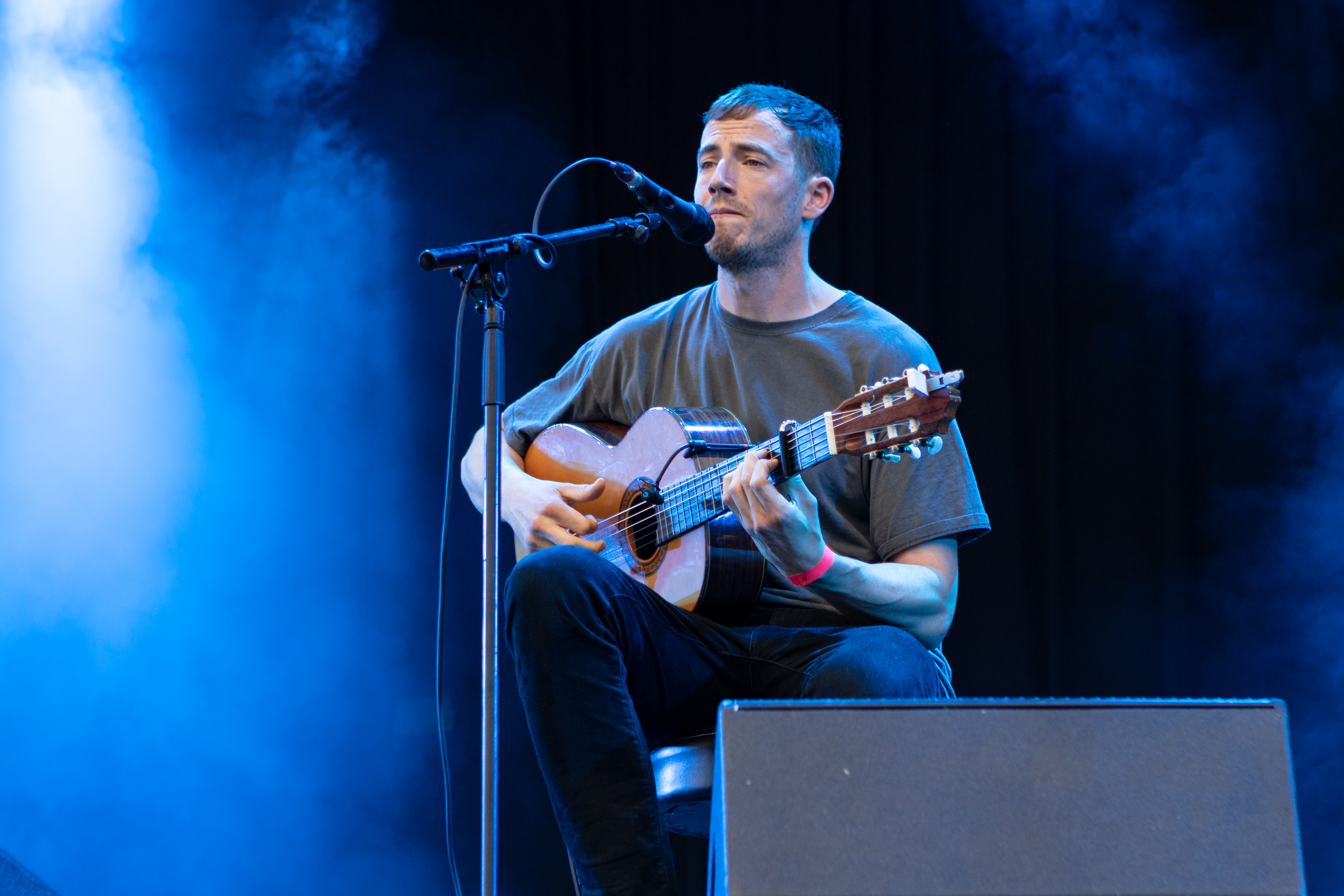
- Cunningham in 2019

Background information
- Born: 1984 (age 41–42); London, England
- Genre: Indie folk
- Occupations: Singer, songwriter, guitarist
- Years active: 2014–present
- Labels: BMG, Infectious Music, Dumont Dumont
- Website: charliecunningham.com

Charlie Cunningham (born 1984) is an English singer-songwriter and guitarist from Buckinghamshire. He has released four studio albums: Lines (2017), Permanent Way (2019), Frame (2023), and In Light (2025).

== Career ==
In January 2017, Charlie Cunningham released his debut album, Lines on Swedish label Dumont Dumont, including lead single, "Minimum", to critical acclaim, and went on tour in Europe and North America later that year. Lines won the Album of the Year Award at the Pop Awards 2018. His second album, Permanent Way, was released in May 2019 on BMG.

== Awards and nominations ==
Year	Award	Category	Nominee/work	Result	Ref.
2018	Pop Awards	Album of the Year Award	Lines	Won	
2018	Pop Awards	Emerging Artist of the Year Award	Charlie Cunningham	Nominated	

== Discography ==
=== Studio albums ===
- Lines (2017)
- Permanent Way (2019)
- Frame (2023)
- In Light (2025)

=== EPs ===
- Outside Things EP (2014)
- Breather EP (2015)
- Heights EP (2016)
- Pieces EP (2020)

=== Singles ===
- "Minimum" (2017)
- "Permanent Way" (2019)
- "Sink In" (2019)
- "Don't Go Far" (2019)
- "Bite" (2019)
- "Climb" with Sophie Jamieson (2020)
