= Arthur Beatrice =

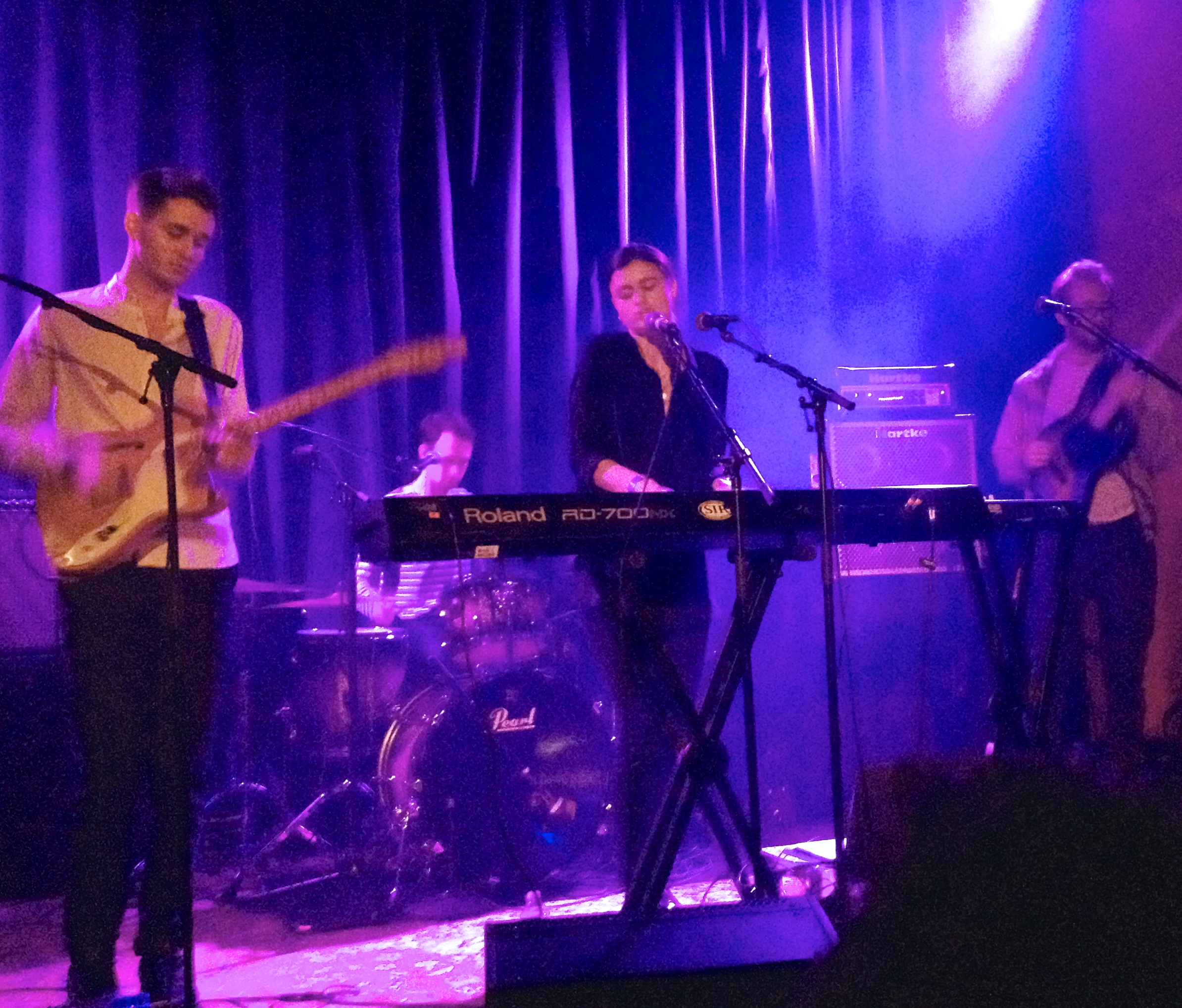
- Arthur Beatrice performing at The Chapel San Francisco, 6 March 2014

Background information
- Genres: indie rock
- Years active: 2010–2016
- Members: Orlando Leopard; Ella Girardot; Elliot Barnes; Hamish Barnes

Arthur Beatrice were an English indie rock band, formed in 2010. Its members were Orlando Leopard (lead vocals, guitar, keyboards, organ), Ella Girardot (lead vocals, keyboards, organ) and brothers Elliot (drums, backing vocals) and Hamish Barnes (bass, backing vocals). They were The Guardian 'New Band of the Day – No. 1132 on Friday 21 October 2011. The group has been inactive since 2016.

Arthur Beatrice deliberately avoided music press attention early in their career. The group launched their first single through word of mouth and social media (for example third party blogging) rather than through more public strategies.

== Musical style ==
Several critics compared them to The xx, The Sundays and The Turtles, however their style was difficult to define.

== Discography ==
=== Albums ===
- 2014: Working Out
- 2016: Keeping The Peace

=== EPs ===
- 2013: Carter

=== Singles ===
- 2012: "Midland"
- 2014: "More Scrapes" (Peak in FRANCE: #105)
- 2015: "Who Returned"
- 2016: "Real Life"
