= Philipp Poisel =

German singer-songwriter (born 1983)

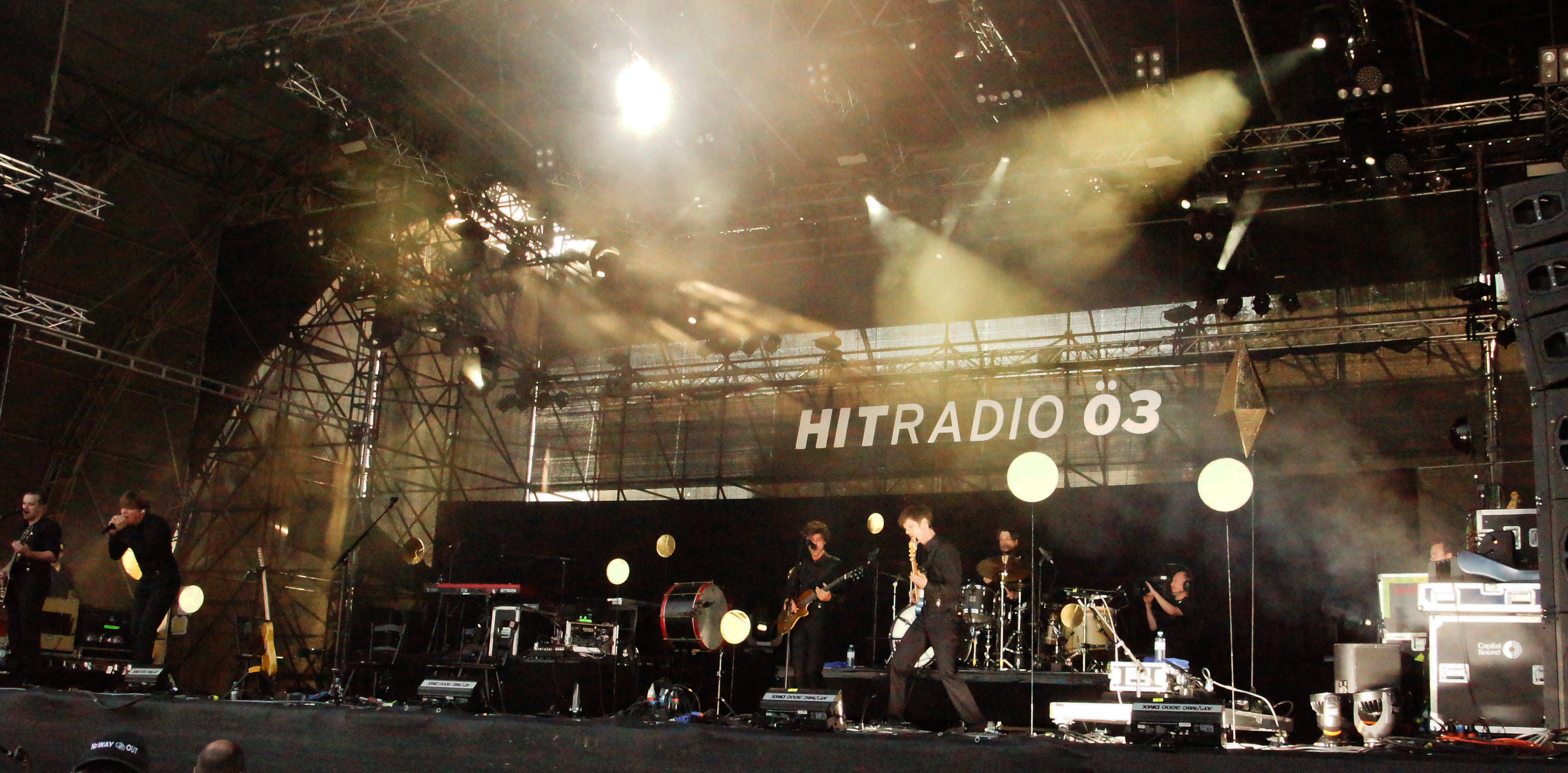
- Poisel in Vienna, 2013

Background information
- Born: 18 June 1983 (age 42); Ludwigsburg, Germany
- Genres: Pop; pop rock
- Occupation: Singer-songwriter
- Instruments: Vocals; Guitar
- Years active: 2008–present
- Labels: Grönland
- Website: www.philipp-poisel.de (in German)

Philipp Poisel /pwaˈzɛl/ (born 18 June 1983 in Ludwigsburg) is a German singer-songwriter.

== Biography ==
=== Early life and career beginnings ===
Philipp Poisel has been producing music since childhood, beginning with playing the drums and guitar. He recorded his compositions using a tape recorder. He was also a member of the choir but faced significant criticism for his singing, which led him to quit. After completing his Abitur exam, he aspired to become a secondary school teacher of English, art, and music. However, he was denied entry to higher education after failing the music entrance examination.

=== First studio album ===
After numerous trips throughout Europe, Poisel met his future producer, Frank Pilsl, with whom he recorded the first demo versions of his songs in the summer of 2006. Poisel also founded his own record label, Holunder-Records, as he was unable to reach an agreement on contract terms with any major labels. In 2007, the renowned German musician Herbert Grönemeyer noticed Poisel and signed him to his record company, Grönland. On 29 August 2008, Poisel's debut album, Wo fängt dein Himmel an?, was released. His eponymous first single, which had been released a few weeks prior to the album, peaked at No. 77 on the German singles chart. Later that year, Poisel served as the opening act for Ane Brun, Maria Mena, Suzanne Vega, and Herbert Grönemeyer.

=== Second studio album and commercial breakthrough ===
After a concert tour in the German-speaking region, Poisel worked on the production of his second studio album, Bis nach Toulouse. It was released on 27 August 2010 and reached No. 8 on the German albums chart. The album remained in the top 50 for eight weeks, making it a success and surpassing his debut album.

In 2011, Poisel contributed his previously unreleased ballad "Eiserner Steg" to the soundtrack of the Matthias Schweighöfer-directed film What a Man, which was released on 26 August 2011. The song was released as a single and reached as high as No. 21 on the German Media Control charts. After being performed by Benny Fiedler on the singing talent show The Voice of Germany in early January 2012, the song climbed from No. 100 to No. 4 on the German singles chart, marking his highest single placement on the German Media Control chart to date.

In August 2012, Poisel released the live album Projekt Seerosenteich, in which he reinterprets 19 of his songs with new string quartets and piano accompaniment. The album debuted at number one on the German albums chart.

In the same month, the single "Wolke 7", a duet between Poisel and Max Herre, was released. The song stayed in the top 10 of the German singles chart for five weeks.

In September 2012, Poisel's single "Wie soll ein Mensch das ertragen?" jumped from No. 59 to No. 5 on the German singles chart after Jean-Michel Aweh performed the song on the talent show Das Supertalent. The single also entered the top ten in Austria following Aweh's performance.

In 2014, Poisel was invited by Band Aid 30 Germany to participate in the German version of the charity song "Do They Know It's Christmas?", which premiered worldwide on 21 November 2014.

=== Third studio album ===
On 16 September 2016, Philipp Poisel released the song "Erkläre mir die Liebe" as a preview from his third studio album.

Poisel resides in Tübingen.

== Awards and achievements ==
- Poisel was one of the nominated artists at the 2011 Echo in the category National Rock/Pop.
- His debut album Wo fängt dein Himmel an was certified Gold in January 2012.
- His single Eiserner Steg was certified Gold in 2012.
- His album Bis nach Toulouse was certified Platinum in January 2013 for selling 200,000 copies in Germany.
- His album Projekt Seerosenteich was certified Gold in January 2013 for selling 100,000 copies in Germany.
- His single Wie soll ein Mensch das ertragen? was certified Gold in 2013 for selling 150,000 copies in Germany.
- His single Wolke 7 was certified Gold in 2013 for selling 150,000 copies in Germany.

== Discography ==
=== Albums ===
- Wo fängt dein Himmel an? (2008)
- Bis nach Toulouse (2010)
- Projekt Seerosenteich (2012)
- Mein Amerika (2017)
- Neon (2021)

=== EPs ===
- Freunde (2019)

=== Singles ===
- "Wo fängt dein Himmel an?" (2008)
- "Ich & Du" (2008)
- "Und wenn die Welt morgen untergeht" (2008)
- "Halt mich" (2008)
- "Seerosenteich" (2008)
- "Mit jedem deiner Fehler" (2009)
- "Als gäb's kein Morgen mehr" (2009)
- "Wie soll ein Mensch das ertragen" (2010)
- "Bis nach Toulouse" (2010)
- "Zünde alle Feuer" (2010)
- "Innen und Außen" (2010)
- "All die Jahre" (2010)
- "Froh dabei zu sein" (2010)
- "Für keine Kohle dieser Welt" (2010)
- "Im Garten von Gettis" (2011)
- "Eiserner Steg" (2011)
- "Ich will nur" (2012)
- "Wolke 7" (with Max Herre) (2012)
- "Liebe meines Lebens" (2013)
- "Bis nach Toulouse" (2013)
- "Herr Reimer" (2014)
- "Durch die Nacht" (2014)
- "Mit jedem deiner Fehler" (2015)
- "Erkläre mir die Liebe" (2016)
- "Bis ans Ende der Hölle" (2016)
- "Das kalte Herz" (2016)
- "Zum ersten Mal Nintendo" (2017)
- "Freunde" (2018)
- "Bordsteinkantenleben" (2019)
- "Alles an dir glänzt" (2020)
- "Das Glück der anderen Leute" (2020)
