= Mitteregger =

Mitteregger is a surname. Notable people with the surname include:

- Herwig Mitteregger (born 1953), Austrian musician
- Rudolf Mitteregger (1944–2024), Austrian cyclist
