= Gisbert zu Knyphausen =

German singer-songwriter

Gisbert Wilhelm Enno Freiherr zu Innhausen und Knyphausen (born 23 April 1979) is a German singer-songwriter from the Rheingau in Hesse.

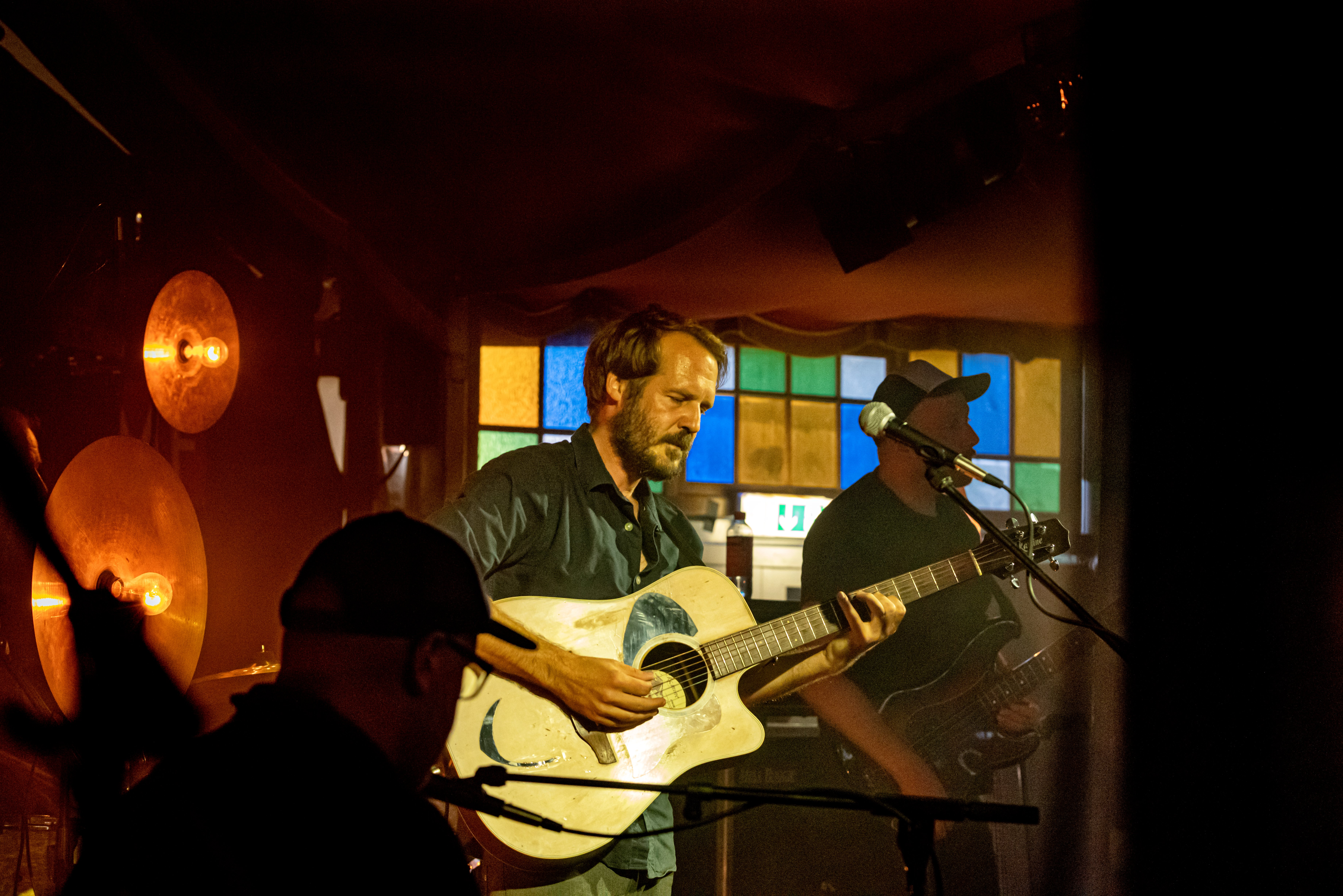
Gisbert zu Knyphausen at the Zelt-Musik-Festival 2019 in Freiburg, Germany

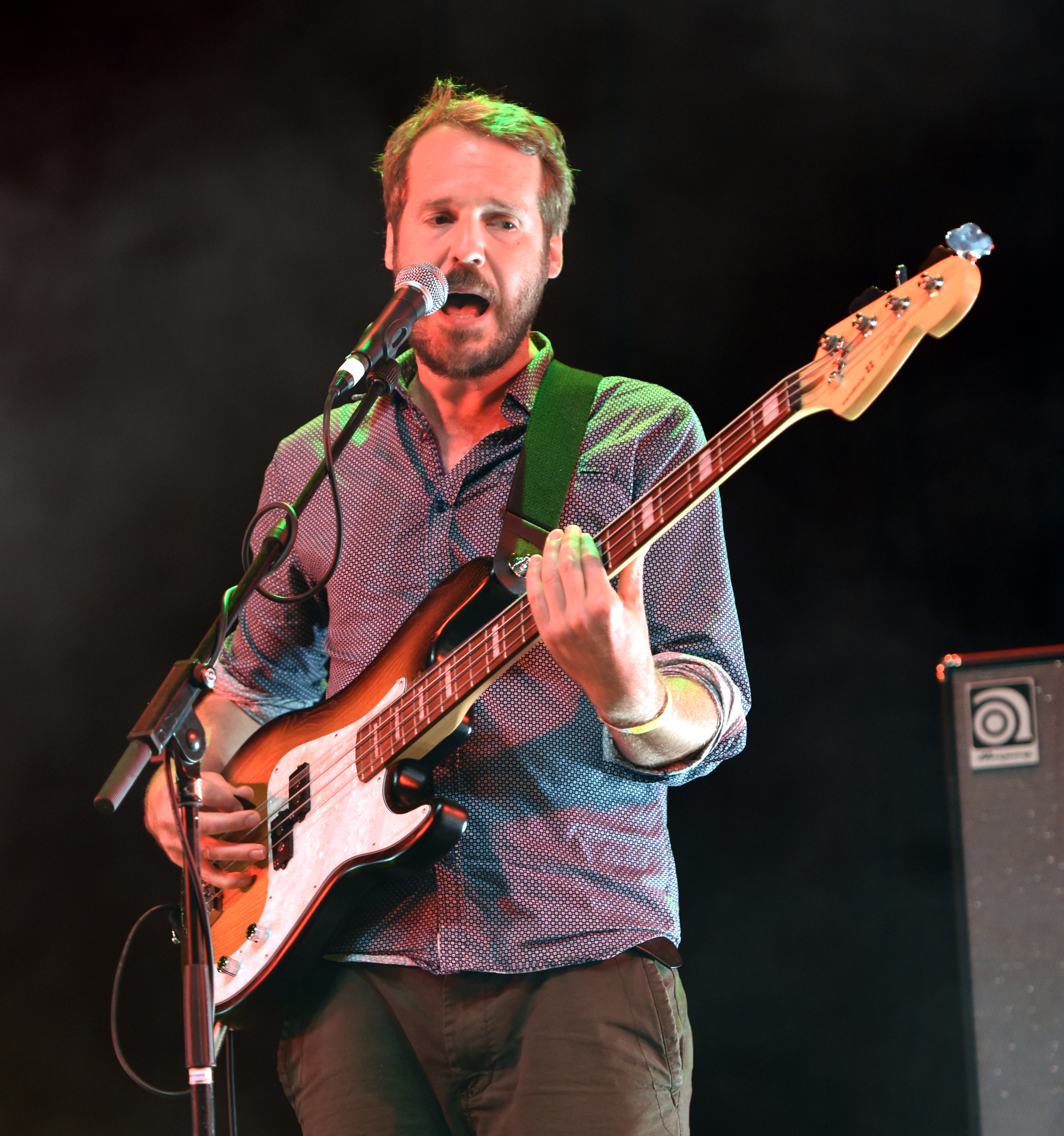
Gisbert zu Knyphausen playing bass for Olli Schulz (Open Flair 2015)

== Development ==
Zu Knyphausen was born in Wiesbaden. After a stay in Berlin, he studied Music Therapy in Nijmegen in the Netherlands. In August 2005, he founded the Indie–Label Omaha Records together with Philipp Heintze. In the following autumn, he played his first solo gig under his own name. He has since switched to using a whole band in his performances. His debut album, Gisbert zu Knyphausen, was launched on 25 April 2008 by PIAS Germany. It contains solistic songs accompanied by a band. Gisbert zu Knyphausen's lyrics are often melancholic, but also have a hopeful character. He mentions ClickClickDecker, Ton Steine Scherben and Element of Crime as his musical and lyrical influences. Zu Knyphausen lived in Hamburg from October 2006 to April 2010, before he moved to Berlin. On 23 April 2010, his album Hurra! Hurra! So nicht was released. In 2017, the album Das Licht dieser Welt made the top ten in Germany.

== Review ==
Zu Knyphausen's debut album received generally positive reviews and was called an "outstanding release" of early summer 2008. His songs have been described as laconic narratives with wry, sometimes sharp humor. Using minimal instrumental backing and the diction of the former century, he still manages to appeal to a young audience, perhaps because the Weltschmerz in his songs nevertheless hints at some hope further off.

== Discography ==
=== Albums ===
- Gisbert zu Knyphausen (2008)
- Hurra! Hurra! So nicht (2010)
- Das Licht dieser Welt (2017)

=== Singles ===
- Spieglein, Spieglein (2006/Sommertag EP)
- Sommertag (2008/Gisbert zu Knyphausen)
- Melancholie (2010/Hurra! Hurra! So nicht)
