= Puma Blue =

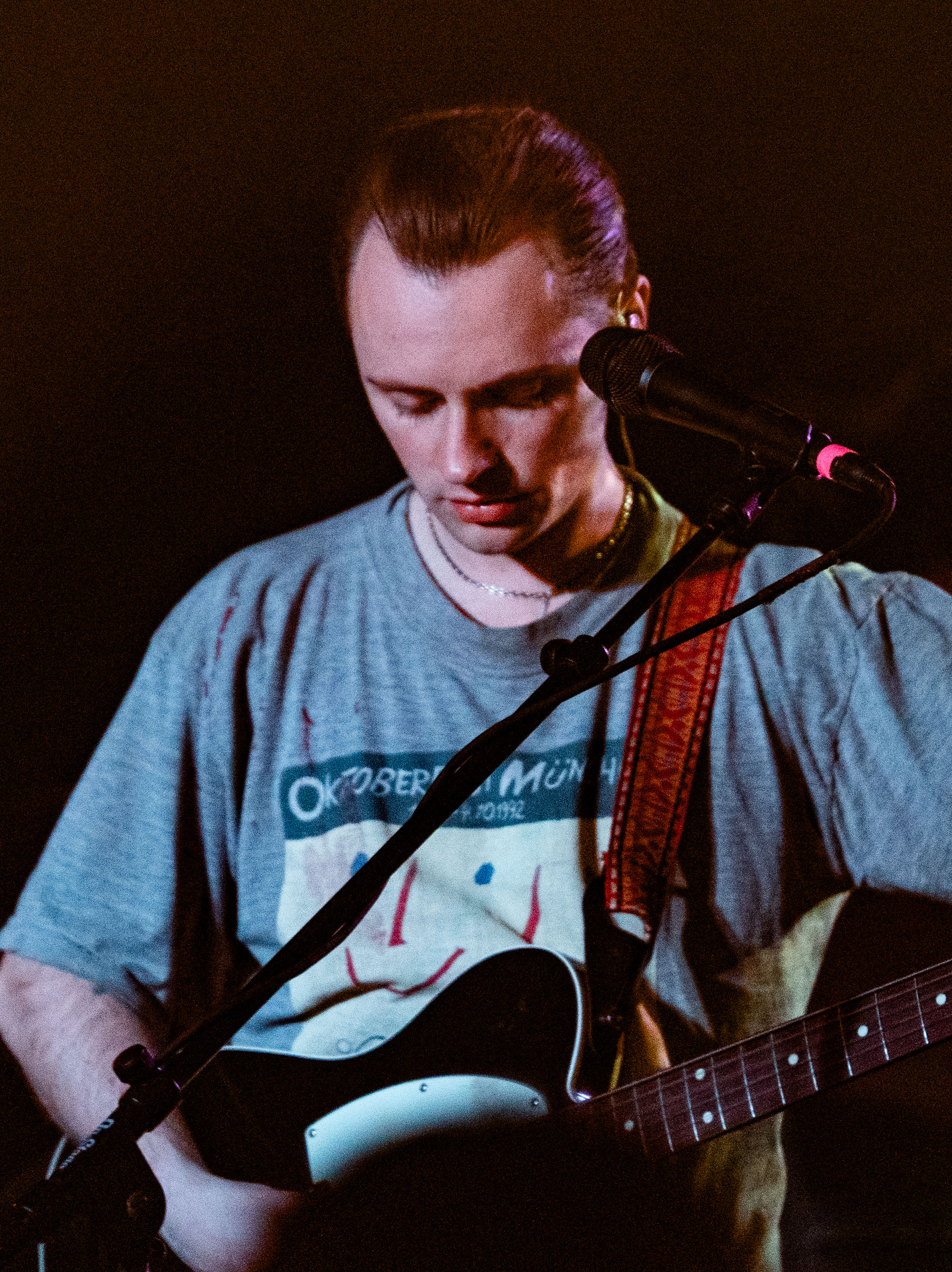

Background information
- Born: February 24, 1995 (age 31)
- Origin: London, United Kingdom
- Genres: Indie Rock; Alternative R&B; experimental rock; Jazz

Jacob Allen, known professionally as Puma Blue, is a London-based singer, songwriter and producer. Allen was brought up in the South London music scene, first gaining prominence for his EP Swum Baby in 2017 and in 2018 with Blood Loss. His early musical style was compared to James Blake and King Krule and for having jazz influences.

== Personal life ==
Allen and his partner are based in Atlanta, Georgia and he moved there from London in 2021.

Both of Allen's parents were music teachers. For his seventh birthday, Allen took drumming lessons and continued to do so, beginning to develop his own style. At thirteen, he learned how to play the guitar and started writing songs.

Allen said he suffered chronic insomnia from the age of ten up until his mid twenties. In a 2025 interview, he revealed he was recently diagnosed with attention deficit hyperactivity disorder.

He went to BRIT School at sixteen and started producing songs around the same age.

== Musical style ==
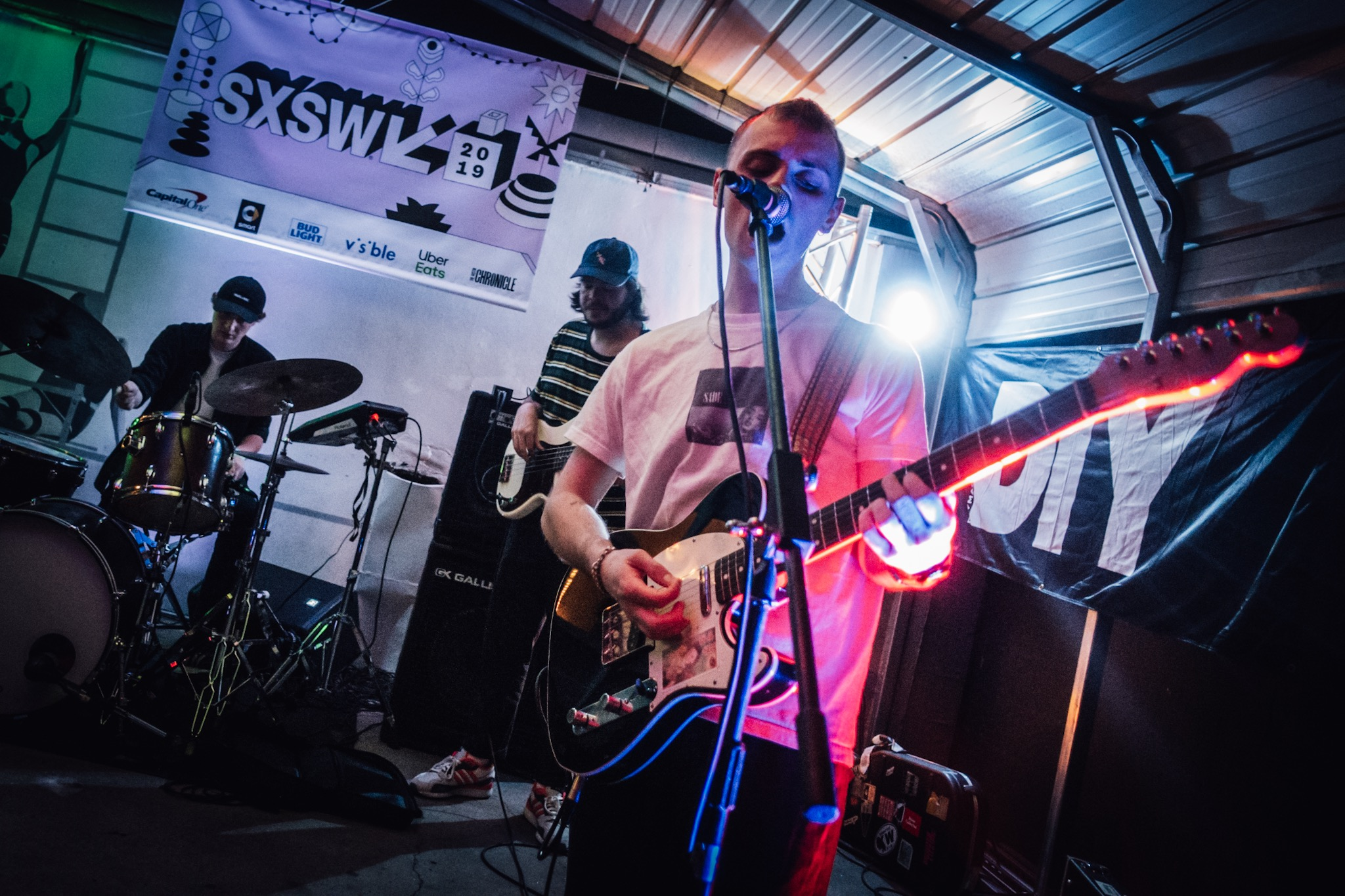
Puma Blue's band performing in 2019 at SXSW

Allen initially produced music independently, often writing and recording alone using guitar and digital production tools. Over time, Puma Blue evolved into a more collaborative project, incorporating a consistent live band in which members contributed to both performances and studio recordings. This shift became especially prominent in Holy Waters (2023), where improvisation and group recording sessions played a larger role in shaping the final sound.

Allen has cited Jeff Buckley, Björk, D'Angelo, Sun Kil Moon, Burial, Deftones, and a few others as musical influences. He described John Frusciante as both a guitarist and artist influence.

The album 'Croak Dream' was influenced by artists like Portishead, Future Sound Of London, and CAN, while drawing from genres like ambient, electronic, and 1990's R&B styles.

== Musical career ==
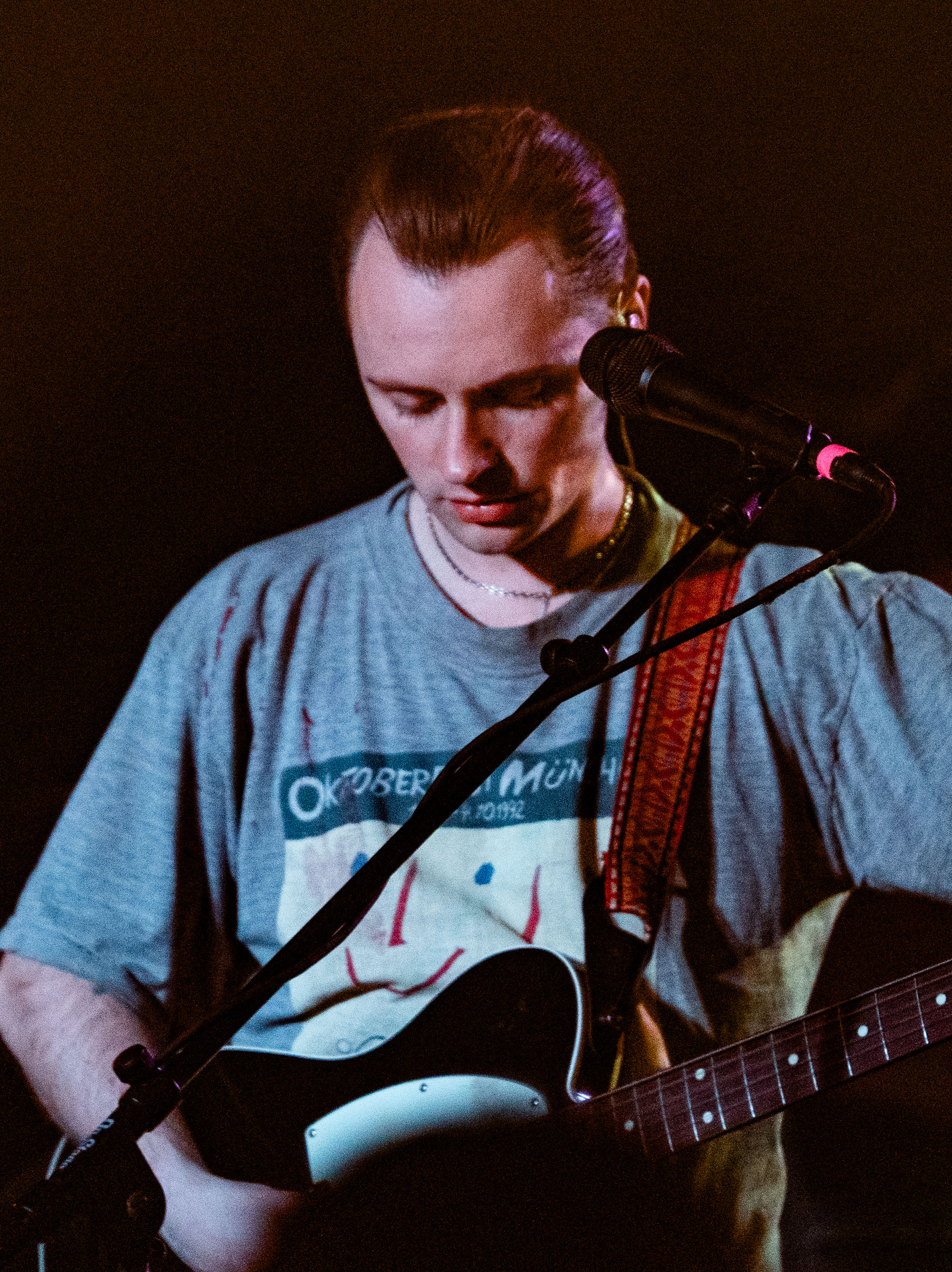
Puma Blue at Black Cat in 2026

Allen first gained popularity from his singles "(She's) Just A Phase" and "Want Me" from his EP Swum Baby, which both received a music video. Moon Undah Waters' music video as of March 2026, has reached 15 million views on YouTube. He also released the concert film A Late Night Special in 2021, which has since accumulated more than 5 million views.

On his first two EPs Swum Baby and Blood Loss within his early years, Puma Blue took a very lo-fi approach, some likened to King Krule's early music. On In Praise Of Shadows, he doubled down on his jazz and R&B styles Follow up Holy Waters, a band-focused meditation on love and grief, was released in 2023.

In 2025, surprise sister-albums antichamber and extchamber explored a minimalist, stripped-back sound, the latter built entirely from obscure ambient arrangements & field recordings.

In 2026, Puma Blue released Croak Dream, a darker, punchier and boldly experimental album that was made by collaging tape loops of jam sessions and scraps of unfinished songs, drawing heavily on Bristol trip-hop and 90s subculture.

== Discography ==
=== Albums ===
- on his own. (Live at Eddie's Attic) (2019)
- In Praise Of Shadows (2021)
- Holy Waters (2023)
- antichamber (2025)
- extchamber (2025)
- Croak Dream (2026)

=== EPs ===
- Swum Baby (2017)
- Only Trying 2 Tell U / Moon Undah Water (2018)
- Blood Loss (2018)
- A Late Night Special EP (2021)
