= Martin Kohlstedt =

German composer, musician, and record producer

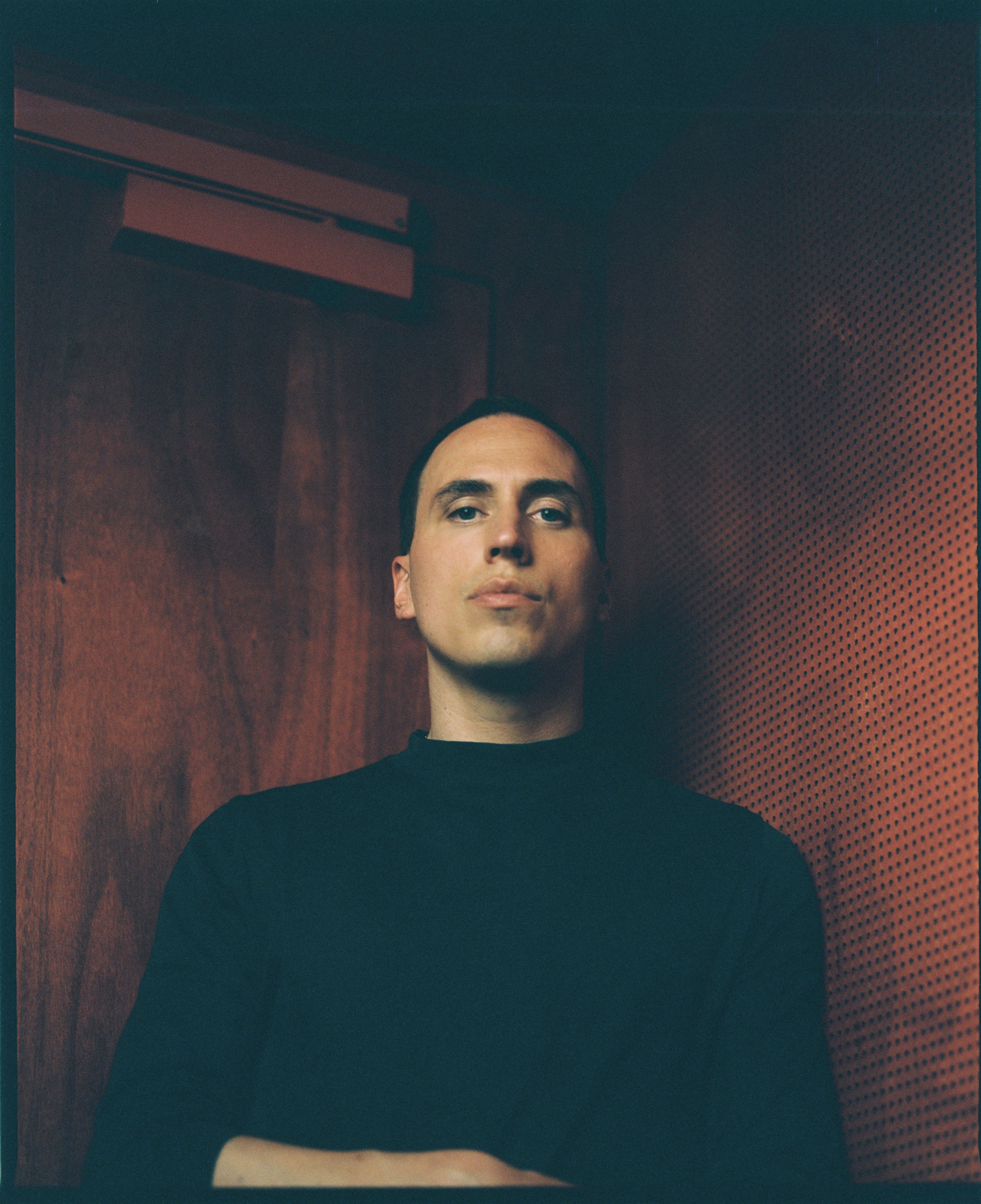
- Martin Kohlstedt, 2026

Background information
- Born: 24 January 1988 (age 38); Breitenworbis, Germany
- Genres: Ambient, electronic, minimalism, modern classical
- Occupations: Composer and producer
- Instruments: Piano, synthesizer
- Label: Edition Kohlstedt
- Website: Official website

Martin Kohlstedt (born 1988) is a German composer, movie soundtrack composer, pianist, and record producer with a contemporary approach of mixing classical and avantgarde music styles.

== Works ==
Martin Kohlstedt studied media art at the Bauhaus University Weimar, was trained in jazz piano and produced electronic dance music before focussing on his solo works.

He initially released two corresponding solo piano albums: Tag (2012) and Nacht (2014). In 2017, a third record followed, called Strom, which also features electronic instrumentation. 2020 saw his fourth solo release, Flur, with a corresponding album Feld following 2023. A concert album titled Live (2024) preceded the most recent release: His seventh album Kluft (2026) moved toward more fixed song structures while retaining modular synthesis and acoustic piano. The production integrates electronic, acoustic, and analog elements.

=== Modular composition and improvisation ===
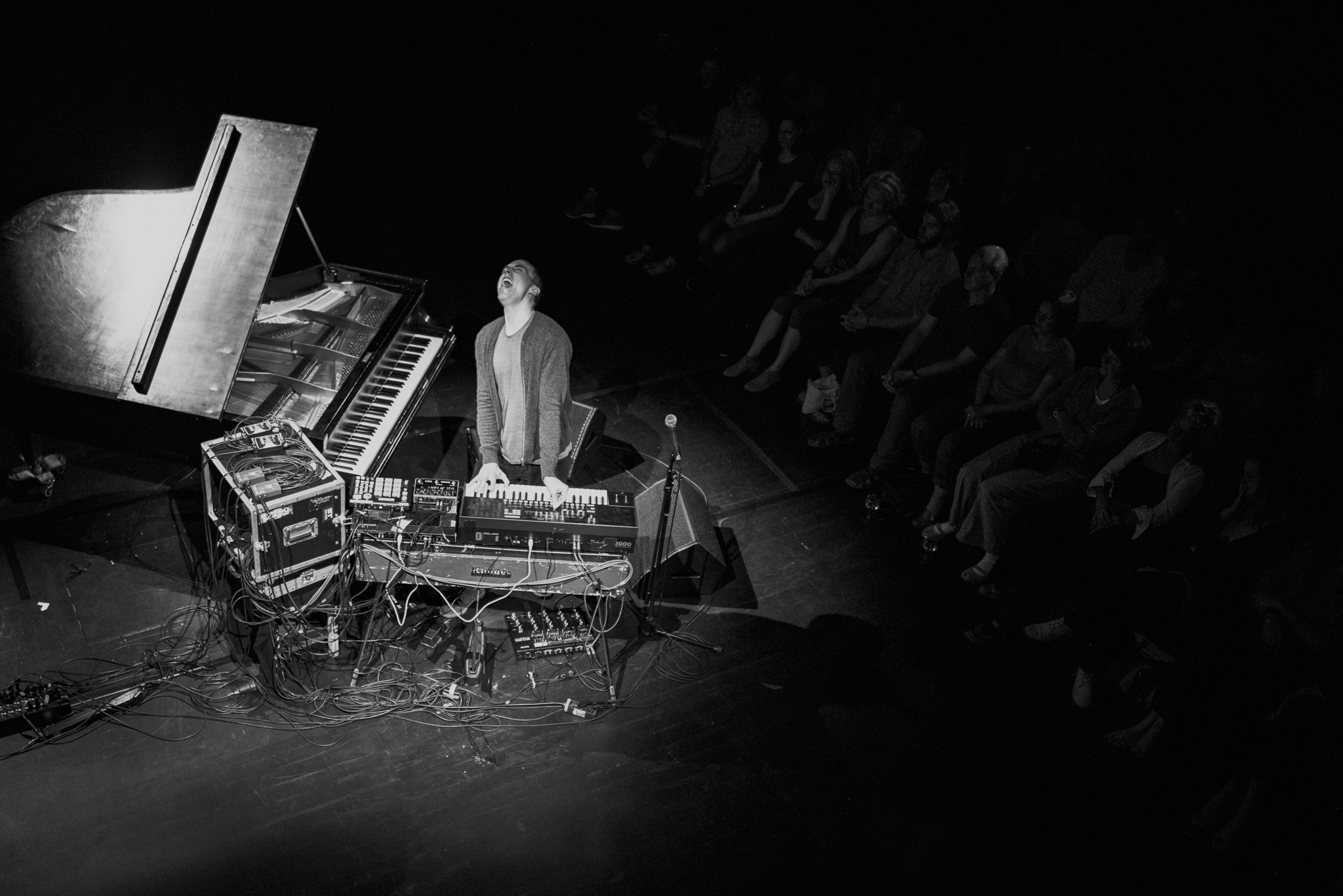
Martin Kohlstedt with grand piano, Fender Rhodes and several synthesizers, live at Theaterhaus Jena, Germany, 2016

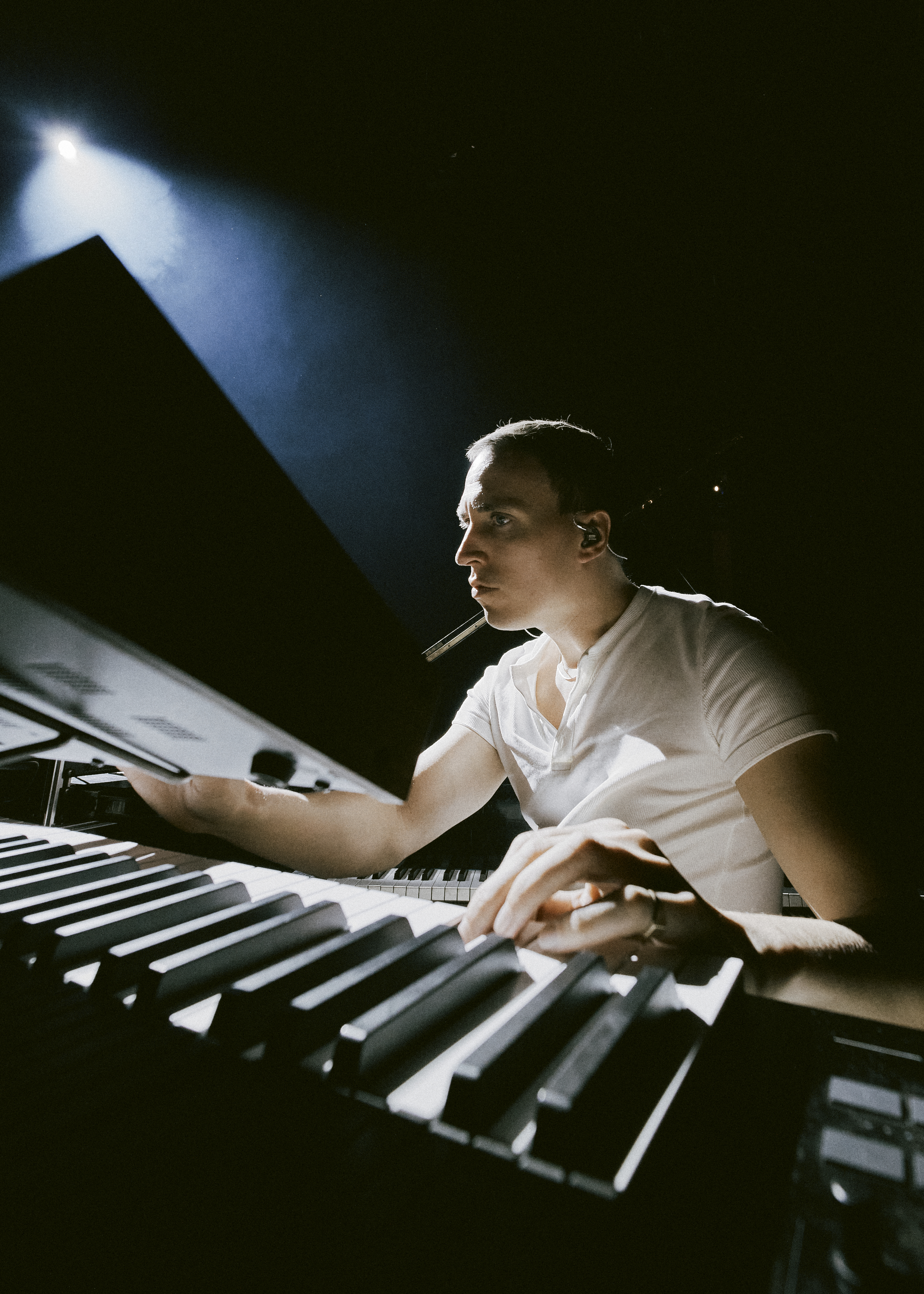
Kohlstedt performing at Kurhaus Augsburg, 2025

Kohlstedt's approach to modular composing – in which a cohesive piece does not exist as a fixed work but is reassembled in performance — was laid out in a 2017 TEDx talk. He demonstrated the principle with the single OMBLEH, derived from the modules OMB and LEH on earlier albums. Another example is the live performance of HARNAO at the Elbphilharmonie.

According to Kohlstedt, modules serve as a base vocabulary that can be combined in different contexts—instrumentation, tempo, or setting. His early albums Tag and Nacht, and later solo albums like Feld and Kluft, collect such modules as material for subsequent live reworking. The intimate production of these records often captures the mechanics of the piano and environmental sounds.

In concert Kohlstedt mostly uses grand and upright pianos with Fender Rhodes and synthesizers, recombining modules in response to room and audience. BR-Klassik described him as reassembling piano pieces on stage "like Lego bricks", letting them react to space and audience—a practice also documented on his 2024 album Live.

He also applied this modular approach in the choir project Ströme with the Gewandhaus in Leipzig (see below).

=== Notable performances ===
Kohlstedt has played international festivals and concert halls, including the Russian State Library in Moscow (including a televised concert for Дождь), the Talar-e Rudaki in Tehran, a sold-out concert in the main hall of the Elbphilharmonie in Hamburg in December 2017, and SXSW.

== Collaborations ==
Next to his solo albums Martin Kohlstedt released several collaborations: 2013 saw the remix album "Tag Remixes" and 2015 the so-called "Nacht Reworks", which are close collaborations with Pop- and electronic artists like FM Belfast, Christian Löffler and Douglas Dare. He also did an improvised live session in 2017 with Peter Broderick.

After 2017 saw the release 'Strom', which no longer contained purely acoustic piano pieces but multi-layered compositions with piano and electronic components, a commissioned collaboration used this set of modules: The full 70 people choir of the Leipzig Gewandhaus Orchestra and its musical director Gregor Meyer performed several public working sessions, during which Kohlstedt's modular play merged with the vocal corpus of the choir into "one completely new instrument". The performance stayed somewhat flexible, with Meyer steering the choir close to Kohlstedts improvisations and vice versa. In 2019, they recorded a version of that performance at the Gewandhaus Leipzig and released it as the album "Ströme". The compositional modules it featured were both new and from the previous albums brought together. As an acclaimed example of the modular improvisation, the full choir had to coordinate with Kohlstedts' dynamic play and the pianist himself had to react to the interpretations of the 70 singers and their conductor. Kohlstedts foundational compositions were treated as "recombinant parts of connected musical ideas". The choir and Martin Kohlstedt went on tour with this performance in 2021.

In 2020 several reworks of 'Ströme' were released as the digital 'RECURRENTS', reshaping the already morphed compositions. Among the collaborators were Sudan Archives, Robag Wruhme (one of the Wighnomy Brothers), Henrik Schwarz, and Hannah Epperson.

== Reception ==
Kohlstedt's work is discussed in the context of contemporary piano music, neoclassicism, and electronic-inflected instrumental music. The Daily Telegraph's Ivan Hewett reviewed Kohlstedt's 2018 London debut and wrote that repetitive patterns and modal harmonies could recall Ryuichi Sakamoto or Ludovico Einaudi, while an "undercurrent of anxiety" and "moments of grandeur" distinguished the performance. After a solo concert at Salon IKSV in Istanbul, Meer described his minimalist piano set as cathartic and harmonically rich, relating his repetitions to John Cage and Steve Reich but stressed that he remained rooted in acoustic piano next to any electronic percussion.

Reviewing a 2019 Dublin date, No More Workhorse noted that the compositional modules "talk to each other" on stage, combining materials in one performance, and that the concert was largely improvised rather than straight album repertoire. Loud And Quiet argued while contemporary European classical piano remained "under-celebrated" in much of the English-speaking music press, Flur (2020) is one of the strongest lockdown-era solo piano records. They praised its shifts between anxiety and calm and described it as a "remarkable showcase" for the range a single instrument could carry.

In their coverage of Kluft (2026), Electronic Groove wrote that the record focuses on meticulous composition and melodic precision compared with Kohlstedt's earlier, more improvisational releases, and that his work bridges cinematic scores and club-oriented electronic music. UK Jazz News placed the album in between modern classical music, contemporary jazz and electronica. All About Jazz highlighted structural work through repetition and crescendos reminiscent of Sigur Rós, and contrasts between rhythmic tracks and more spacious material.

In 2017, Die Zeit published a filmed documentary about his work in two parts.

== Art & sound installations ==
- In 2017, Martin Kohlstedt created a visual-acoustic performance called "Currents" in collaboration with Reeperbahn Festival and the design groups 'Bloodbrothers' and 'Elektropastete'. In "Currents" generatively generated visualizations were projected in a specially built 360° dome. Kohlstedt played live in this dome and his play responded actively to the visuals.
- Martin Kohlstedt composed the score for a 'fireworks musical' commissioned by the 'Feria Nacional de la Pirotecnia' fireworks festival in Tultepec, Mexico, the largest of its kind in Latin America.
- In 2019 Kohlstedt composed an interactive sound installation titled "KIUMAKO" for the Burning Man Festival, Nevada, in collaboration with 'Kunst-Technik-Einheit'. Several algorithms work together and generate different dramaturgies, melodies, bars and instrumentation under the influence of the visitors and their behavior.

== Discography ==
=== Solo albums ===
- 2012: Tag
- 2014: Nacht
- 2015: Nacht Reworks
- 2017: Strom
- 2019: Ströme
- 2020: FLUR
- 2023: FELD
- 2024: Live
- 2026: Kluft

=== Singles & EPs ===
- 2013: Tag Remixes (EP - Edition Kohlstedt)
- 2017: OMBLEH (Single - Edition Kohlstedt)
- 2020: JINGOL (Henrik Schwarz Recurrent) (Single - Warner Classics)
- 2020: THIPHY (Peter Broderick Reimagining) (Single - Warner Classics)
- 2020: SENIMB (Robag Wruhme Marowk Rehand) (Single - Warner Classics)
- 2020: KSYCHA (ÄTNA Who Are You Rework) (Single - Warner Classics)
- 2020: AMSOMB (Marlow Re-Mood) (Single - Warner Classics)
- 2020: TARLEH (Hannah Epperson Recurrent) (Single - Warner Classics)
- 2020: NIODOM (Panthera Krause Recurrent) (Single - Warner Classics)
- 2020: AUHEJA (Sudan Archives Recurrent) (Single - Warner Classics)

=== Movie scores & soundtracks ===
- 2010: Margot (Clemens Beier)
- 2011: Lo Vedo (Rafael Vogel)
- 2011: Ausgeträumt (Konstantin Egerndorfer)
- 2015: Hexenmilch (Martin Jehle)
- 2016: Anna (Martin Jehle)
- 2016: Farewell Halong (No Fairway to Halong Bay) (Duc Ngo Ngoc)
- 2016: Ein Haufen Liebe (Alina Cyranek)
- 2017: Monju Hunters of Sofugan Island (Karim Eich and Dirk Wachsmuth)
- 2018: Das Leben in mir (Konstantin Egerndorfer)
- 2018: MOJSŁOŃIK - My Little Elephant (Silke Meya)
- 2019: Uferfrauen – Lesbisches L(i)eben in der DDR (Barbara Wallbraun)
- 2020: The Man with the Camera (B.K. Wunder)
- 2020: Grace (Konstantin Egerndorfer)
- 2021: A Higher Law (Octav Chelaru)
- 2022: Die Ecke (Christa Pfafferott)
- 2026: Segeljungs – Mit null Ahnung um die Welt (Tim Hund, Tobias Steinigeweg)
- 2026: Lieblingsmenschen – Die außergewöhnliche Freundschaft von Agnes & Amir (Helena Hufnagel)

== Environmentalism ==
In 2019 Kohlstedt bought 1.2 hectare of land in the Thuringian Forest to reforest it. Over 100 volunteers helped this project which is financed by concert ticket sales. In the first phase 10,000 trees are to be planted. The project is an effort to integrate actions on climate change into the music industry. In a 2026 interview, Kohlstedt claimed the project now comprises seven forest areas and that more than 5,000 trees had now been planted.
