= Jess MacCormack =

Canadian artist

- Education: M.F.A., Public Art and New Artistic Strategies, Bauhaus University, 2008

Jess MacCormack (born 1974 in British Columbia), formerly known as Jessica MacCormack and more commonly known as Jess Mac, is a genderqueer interdisciplinary artist whose work deals with the intersection of institutional violence with personal traumas. They work with oppressed communities to create collaborative art that engenders agency, both personal and political. Their recent work covers topics such as criminalization, HIV/AIDS, sexual assault, mental health, racism, and transphobia, and utilize animation, video, painting, and collage. Their art integrates various elements of interactivity, performance, intervention, installation, and video, in order to engage viewers in a meaningful way; at the same time, they aim to destabilize high art and culture in favor of socially and politically engaged content. In exploring and critiquing institutional structures that create systematic oppression, MacCormack's work is frequently both collective and collaborative.

MacCormack shares many of their digital collages and gifs on Facebook under the name "Jess Mac", as well as through their Tumblr account. Some of their notable pieces are: a book entitled The See; an image series entitled Silence = Shutthefuckup; and a documentary project entitled Where we were not Part 1: Feeling Reserved, Alexus’ story. A complete list of their work can be found on their website.

== Career ==
MacCormack graduated from Bauhaus University in 2008 with an MFA in Public Art and New Artistic Strategies. They were then an assistant professor of Studio Arts at Concordia University from 2010 to 2013.

From 2008 to 2009, Jess MacCormack was the artist in residence at the Crossing Communities Art Project, during which they mentored women and youth in video, photography, and painting. Crossing Communities was an art program in downtown Winnipeg that offered workshops, studio space, and support to criminalized and at-risk women and youth.

From 2017 to 2026, MacCormack taught at Emily Carr University of Art + Design, and is currently completing a PhD in Contemporary Art at Simon Fraser University in Vancouver, BC.

== Projects ==
=== Where We Were Not ===
MacCormack collaborated with Alexus Young, a Métis woman who identifies as two-spirited, to create Where we were not Part 1: Feeling Reserved, Alexus’ story, a short film that screened at the imagineNATIVE Film + Media Arts Festival in 2012. The film is a story about Young's experiences as a survivor of the Saskatoon starlight tours. "Where We Were Not Feeling Reserved" is not a traditional documentary, but rather a collage of grainy historic and news footage, along with animated sirens and caricatured police frowns. According to Young, the animation specifically refers to a larger story of racism and assimilation in Canada, and the film is not meant to specifically portray Saskatoon or blame individual police officer, but rather to indict a corrupt system.

=== The See ===
Launched while MacCormack was still on faculty at Concordia, The See " is an account of their experience of sexual abuse as a child and the trauma that remains in their life as a result. It speaks in direct and indirect terms to the subject, integrating text and imagery in ways that both illustrate and complicate the narrative. Dealing with a similar topic of childhood sexual abuse and trauma, MacCormack produced a stop-motion animation entitled Nothing Ever Happened that exhibited in 2010 at Ace Art in a two-person show with Elisabeth Belliveau entitled Natural Disasters, Pets, and Other Stories.

=== HIV Activism ===
MacCormack’s series Silence = Shutthefuckup deals with HIV criminalization laws, inspired by news of a man living with HIV charged for attempted murder by administering a noxious fluid, i.e. his semen. MacCormack, in an interview with Visual AIDS, said that their work intersects with their friends’ experiences with HIV/AIDS, their own history of sexual abuse and mental illness, and their work with people in conflict with the law. To support AIDS Community Care Montreal, they have exhibited work at ARTSIDA, an annual art exhibition and benefit auction. Their exhibits include Poppy Boy in 2012, a watercolor painting; and Dionysus in Drag in 2015, a digital print.
