= Conclave (soundtrack) =

Conclave (Original Motion Picture Soundtrack)

Film score by Volker Bertelmann
- Released: 25 October 2024
- Recorded: 2023–2024
- Studio: Angel Recording Studios, London; East Connection Music Recording Co., Studio 22, Budapest
- Length: 44:07
- Label: Back Lot Music
- Producer: Volker Bertelmann

Volker Bertelmann chronology
| One Life (Original Motion Picture Soundtrack) (2024) | Conclave (Original Motion Picture Soundtrack) (2024) | Dune: Prophecy (Soundtrack from the Series) (2024) |

Conclave (Original Motion Picture Soundtrack) is the soundtrack album to the 2024 political thriller film Conclave directed by Edward Berger, starring Ralph Fiennes, Stanley Tucci, John Lithgow, Sergio Castellitto and Isabella Rossellini. The film features musical score composed by Volker Bertelmann and was released through Back Lot Music on 25 October 2024.

The score emphasized on the use of Cristal Baschet as the prominent sound heard throughout the score. Bertelmann experimented on using lesser-known instruments, to refrain from relying on the music being classical or ecclesiastical. It was performed by the London Contemporary Orchestra and Budapest Art Orchestra, respectively conducted by Robert Ames and Peter Pejtsik.

The score received positive reviews from critics and Bertelmann was nominated for Academy Award for Best Original Score, BAFTA Award for Best Original Music, Golden Globe Award for Best Original Score, Critics' Choice Movie Award for Best Score, Satellite Award for Best Original Score and Hollywood Music in Media Award for Best Original Score in a Feature Film amongst other accolades.

== Background and production ==
German composer Volker Bertelmann composed the original score to Conclave, in his fifth film collaboration with Berger. During the 95th Academy Awards press tour, where Bertelmann was nominated for All Quiet on the Western Front (2022) at the Best Original Score category (and eventually winning that award), Berger discussed about the script to Bertelmann and wanted him to avoid the renaissance and baroque musical style in the Vatican—the soundscape which Bertelmann asked to develop was neither "too ecclesiastical [nor] classical", which led to him experimenting with lesser-known instruments.

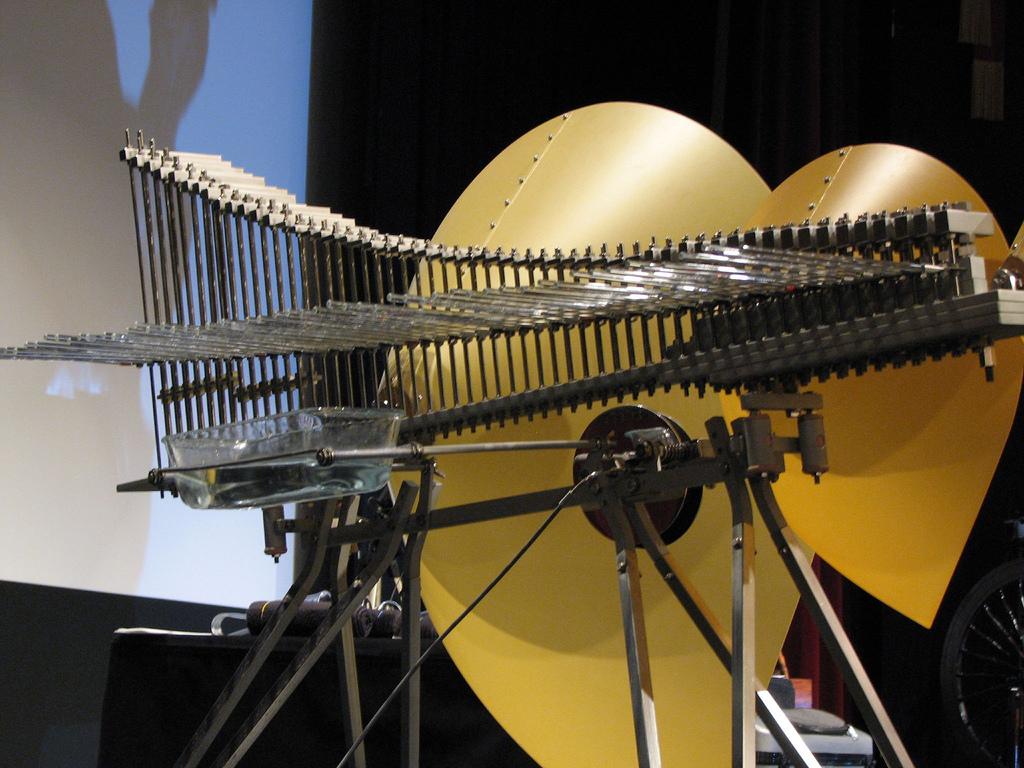
A Cristal Baschet, played using wet hands, is prominently featured in the film's score

While Bertelmann used a century-old harmonium to play in lower notes, for the score of All Quiet on the Western Front, he needed to employ a similar approach for the Conclave to set the religious tone. In search of an acoustic instrument that "sounds like a synthesizer or something electronic", Bertelmann chose the Cristal Baschet, (Note: The Cristal Baschet invented in 1952, sounded similar to the glass harp, and was made out of tuned glass rods. Bertelmann, added that the instrument also had "metal cylinders that transport and amplify the sound, and suddenly these glass rods begin to transform into a distorted sound" which was heard in the reflective moments in the film.) a crystallophone played using wet hands, as the predominant sound for the film score. The instrument was thematically fitting for the film's score, as it produces a feel of an "otherwordly space" and its handmade playing, helped him to produce "strange and divine" sounds. Bertelmann added that "The Cristal Baschet theme is celebrating a religious feeling and inner strength and belief as something that is important for humans. But at the same time, I can also use it to go nasty in certain areas."

"I'm working with electronic elements, and I'm using experimental sounds a lot that [appear] in a lot of modern classical music or in quite arty music because I really like the texture. I like sounds that you can touch, somehow, where you hear the viscerality."

— Volker Bertelmann on producing the film score for Conclave

In addition, Bertelmann had string players use a ricochet bowing technique. The sounds were layered in a tactical and animalistic manner, which Bertelmann felt that "we are watching a ritual that has [a very] tribal quality to it" and wanted to enhance it a little more and "make it raw". He wanted to add an uncertainty to the score, "by creating music that isn't always exact or precise" and added cracks in the Sistine Chapel into the score, so that he can produce "random, weird sounds". In order to mirror the film's conflicting factions within the cardinals, Bertelmann sometimes incorporated polyrhythms, such as triplets against eighth or sixteenth notes.

Due to many characters sharing scenes in the film, Bertelmann chose to create themes for specific situations as opposed to themes for individual characters. He also included more music in dialogue without losing connections with each other.

The musical cue "Seal the Room" was a late addition to the score. Bertelmann, Berger and producer Tessa Ross wanted a cue which was contrast to the end credits music, "which would be a deep breath of relief, light filtering back in after the end of the conclave." After three tries, Bertelmann developed a revised version which they liked, and with this idea, they replaced cues later in the film and changing certain cues.

== Critical reception ==
Jonathan Broxton, in his review for Movie Music UK, described the score as "outstanding in the film, adding weight and seriousness to the underlying themes and its central mystery, while also subliminally acknowledging many of the issues affecting the church today in terms of its relevance to the modern world. When you combine this with the immensely positive effect of its brilliant end credits piece, its overall impact is undeniable." Clarisse Loughrey of The Independent described the score as "sparse but methodical", while Wendy Ide of The Guardian called it as "forceful, emphatic score". Richard Lawson of Vanity Fair called the score "turgid".

Tim Grierson of Screen International wrote "Volker Bertelmann's thundering score sometimes creates the mistaken impression that we are watching a monumental drama". Stephen Farber of The Hollywood Reporter wrote "Composer Volker Bertelmann, who won an Oscar for his score for All Quiet on the Western Front, demonstrates his expertise as well as his versatility with his work here." Katie Walsh of Los Angeles Times wrote "The slashing strings of composer Volker Bertelmann's score ably convey the stakes of the situation." Pete Hammond of Deadline Hollywood wrote "Oscar winner Volker Bertelmann's towering score never overwhelms the actions but immeasurably adds to the pace."

Justin Chang in his review for NPR summarized "Volker Bertelmann's score is as bombastic as an exorcism." Nick Schager of The Daily Beast wrote "Volker Bertelmann's string-heavy orchestral score goes so incredibly hard during these early passages that the film feels as if it's straining for enormity."

== Track listing ==
All tracks are written by Volker Bertelmann.

Conclave (Original Motion Picture Soundtrack) track listing
| No. | Title | Length |
|---|---|---|
| 1. | "Overture of Conclave" | 1:27 |
| 2. | "Tears" | 1:46 |
| 3. | "Rumours" | 1:59 |
| 4. | "Seal the Room" | 2:02 |
| 5. | "Arrival" | 2:01 |
| 6. | "Soon Enough" | 1:36 |
| 7. | "Prayer" | 0:44 |
| 8. | "The Abyss Calls Out" | 0:59 |
| 9. | "First Day" | 0:44 |
| 10. | "Walk of Doubt" | 1:10 |
| 11. | "Route of Fear" | 1:07 |
| 12. | "First Election" | 1:11 |
| 13. | "Not What We Had Hoped" | 1:43 |
| 14. | "Evening Prayer" | 0:34 |
| 15. | "Second Day" | 1:22 |
| 16. | "Still No Result" | 2:22 |
| 17. | "I Don't Want Your Vote" | 1:16 |
| 18. | "Withdraw Your Name" | 0:47 |
| 19. | "You Should Be Careful" | 4:10 |
| 20. | "Discovery" | 0:58 |
| 21. | "I Would Choose John" | 0:47 |
| 22. | "Explosion" | 1:36 |
| 23. | "Walk Through Rain" | 1:26 |
| 24. | "Innocent" | 1:54 |
| 25. | "What Is Troubling You?" | 0:57 |
| 26. | "It Is Official" | 0:40 |
| 27. | "Postlude of Conclave" | 6:36 |

== Personnel ==
Credits adapted from Film Music Reporter:

- Music composer and producer by: Volker Bertelmann
- Music supervisor: Jenn Egan
- Score co-producer: Ben Winkler
- Music editor: Richard Armstrong
- Score mixed By: Daniel Kresco
- Publishing: Pine and Oak Publishing, House Conclave Limited

Instruments

- Cristal Baschet: Marc Chouarain
- Violin and viola: Karina Buschinger
- Cellos: Laura Wiek, Daniel Brandl, Moritz Benjamin Kolb
- Contrabass and special contrabass sounds: Yair Elazar Glotman
- Vocals and vocal engineering by: Alev Lenz
- Clarinet and bass clarinet: Andy Miles
- Modular synthesizer: Francesco Fabris
- Percussion: Kai Angermann
- Additional gong recordings: Lennart Saathoff
- Additional cello and timpani recordings: Ben Winkler

London Contemporary Orchestra

- Conductor: Robert Ames
- Orchestration: Jan Andrees, Gregor Keienburg, Raffael Seyfried
- Pro-tools engineers: Alexander Nikoleit, Philipp Kaminsky, Ozan Tekin, Paul Müller Reyes, Lambert Windges, Benedikt Wild, Ramon Gonzalez, Isabella Forster
- 1st violin (quartet and section leader): Zahra Benyounes
- 1st violins: Haris Jenson, Antonia Kessel, Anna De Bruin, Nicole Crespo O'Donoghue, Nicole Stokes
- 2nd violin (quartet and section leader): Venetia Jollands
- 2nd violins: Alicia Berendse, Guy Button, Patrick Dawkins, Nadine Nagen, Radhika De Saram
- Viola (quartet and section leader): Zoe Matthews
- Violas cello (quartet and section leader): Matthew Kettle, Elisa Bergersen, Meghan Cassidy
- Cellos: Nathaniel Boyd, Verity Evanson, Eve Heyde
- Basses: Tom Walley, Gwen Reed
- Copyist: Ananda Chatterjee
- LCO recording project managers: Cassandra Curling, Meg Monteith
- LCO orchestra manager: Amy-Elisabeth Hinds
- Recorded at: Angel Recording Studios, London
- Recording engineer: John Barrett
- Recording tape OP: Daniel Hayden

Budapest Art Orchestra

- Conductor: Peter Pejtsik
- Contractor/orchestral music production by: Miklos Lukacs
- Recorded at: East Connection Music Recording Co., Studio 22, Budapest
- Recording engineer: Gabor Buczko
- Recording tape OP: Miklos Lukacs Sr.

== Accolades ==
| Award | Date of ceremony | Category | Recipient(s) | Result | Ref. |
|---|---|---|---|---|---|
| Academy Awards | 2 March 2025 | Best Original Score | Volker Bertelmann | Nominated | |
| British Academy Film Awards | 16 February 2025 | Best Original Score | Volker Bertelmann | Nominated | |
| Critics' Choice Movie Awards | 7 February 2025 | Best Score | Volker Bertelmann | Nominated | |
| Florida Film Critics Circle | 20 December 2024 | Best Original Score | Volker Bertelmann | Nominated | |
| Golden Globe Awards | 5 January 2025 | Best Original Score | Volker Bertelmann | Nominated | |
| Hollywood Music in Media Awards | 20 November 2024 | Best Original Score – Feature Film | Volker Bertelmann | Nominated | |
| San Francisco Bay Area Film Critics Circle | 15 December 2024 | Best Original Score | Volker Bertelmann | Nominated | |
| Satellite Awards | 26 January 2025 | Best Original Score | Volker Bertelmann | Nominated | |
| Seattle Film Critics Society | 16 December 2024 | Best Original Score | Volker Bertelmann | Nominated | |
| Society of Composers & Lyricists | 12 February 2025 | Outstanding Original Score for a Studio Film | Volker Bertelmann | Nominated | |
| St. Louis Film Critics Association | 15 December 2024 | Best Score | Volker Bertelmann | Nominated | |
| Washington D.C. Area Film Critics Association | 8 December 2024 | Best Original Score | Volker Bertelmann | Nominated | |
