= Solo (Nils Frahm album) =

Studio album by Nils Frahm
- Released: 29 March 2015
- Length: 42:42
- Label: Erased Tapes

Nils Frahm chronology
Spaces (2013)	Solo (2015)	All Melody (2018)

Solo is a studio album by German composer and musician Nils Frahm. It is a solo piano album and was released on 29 March 2015 through Erased Tapes Records.

== Background ==
Nils Frahm is a German composer and musician originally from Hamburg. He is based in Berlin. Solo is his follow-up to Spaces (2013). It is a solo piano album.

In the late 1980s, an upright piano called the M370 was built by David Klavins. Stored in the German town of Tübingen, it weighs 1.8 tons and is 370 centimeters high. Over the course of four days in January 2014, Frahm improvised on the piano, recording nine hours of material. Solo consists of eight tracks, clocking in at 43 minutes.

== Release ==
Solo was released on 29 March 2015, the first annual Piano Day, through Erased Tapes Records. In reference to the 88 keys on a piano, Frahm declared the 88th day of each year to be a Piano Day. The album was initially made available as a free download. It was also released on vinyl and CD. Proceeds from the sales of the album goes to helping Frahm and Klavins build a larger piano called the M450.

On 28 March 2016, the second annual Piano Day, Frahm released Solo Remains. The EP consists of four outtakes from the Solo sessions. It was initially made available as a free download.

== Critical reception ==
Professional ratings
Review scores
Source	Rating
Mojo	4/5 stars
Pitchfork	7.3/10

Mark Richardson of Pitchfork wrote, "Solo is almost exactly what you might expect from a record like this one; it's spare, it's lyrical, it's generally quiet, and it's very pretty." He added, "During its best moments Solo brings to mind some of the lower-stakes work of Harold Budd, where melody and mood become two sides of the same coin." Tom Watson of Crack described the album as "the product of a composer leading a generation of embryonic radicals." He added, "And instead of lazily basking in his own caricatured sentimentality, Frahm permits Solo's space composure to carry you towards a state of total tranquility."

=== Accolades ===
Year-end lists for Solo
Publication	List	Rank	Ref.
The 405	The 30 Best Albums of 2015	29	
Crack	Albums of the Year 2015	51	
Drowned in Sound	Favourite Albums of the Year 2015	17	

== Track listing ==
Solo track listing
No.	Title	Length
1.	"Ode"	4:34
2.	"Some"	4:14
3.	"Circling"	3:44
4.	"Merry"	4:08
5.	"Chant"	5:12
6.	"Wall"	4:45
7.	"Immerse!"	10:46
8.	"Four Hands"	5:19
Total length:		42:42

== Personnel ==
Credits adapted from liner notes.

- Nils Frahm – recording, mixing, mastering
- Matthias H. Franz Hahn – recording
- Janice Wong – cover image
- Torsten Posselt – design

== Charts ==
Chart performance for Solo
Chart (2015)	Peak position
Belgian Albums (Ultratop Flanders)	103
UK Independent Albums Breakers (Official Charts)	20
