= Nils Frahm =

German musician (born 1982)

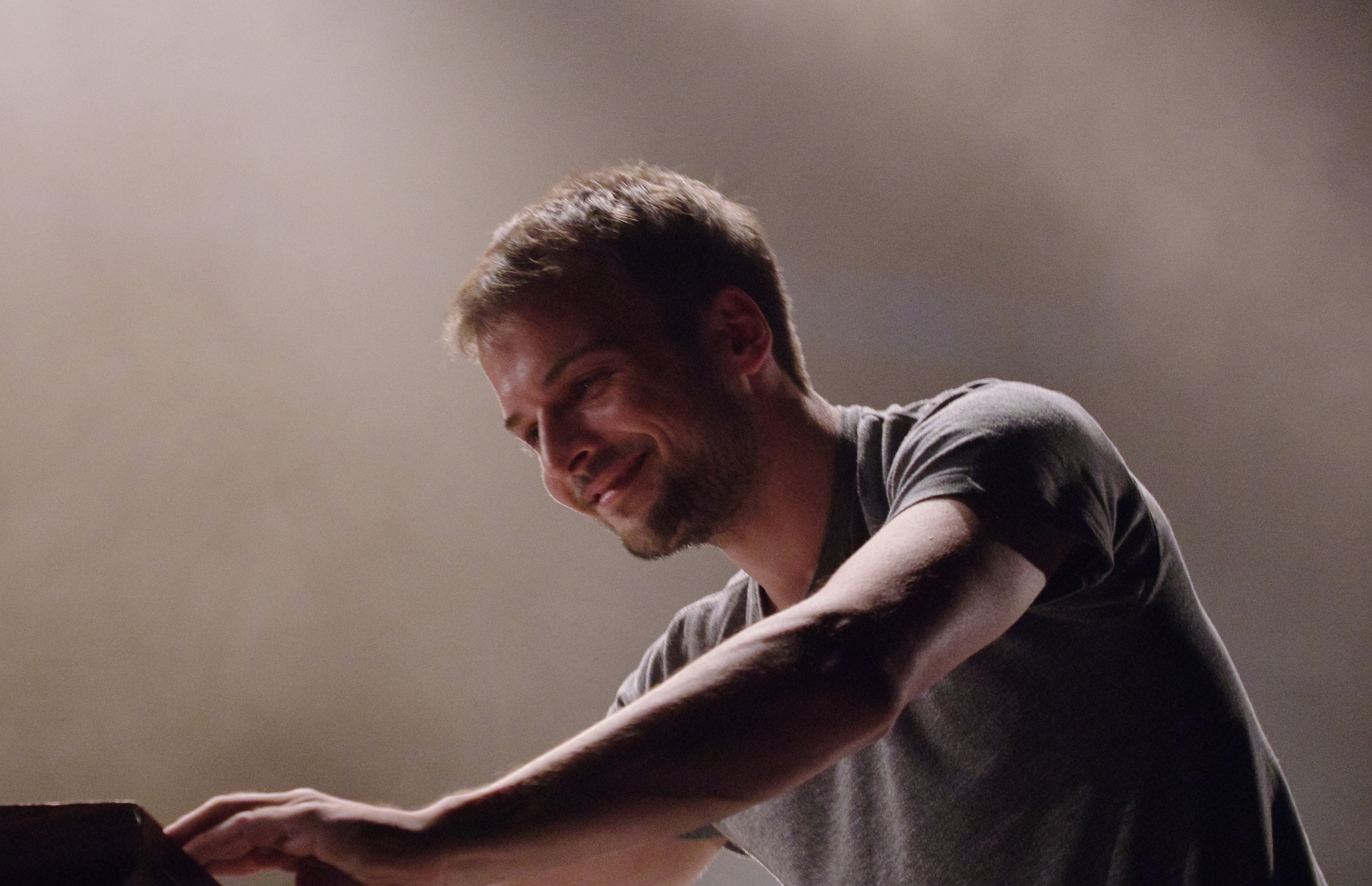
- Frahm in 2015

Background information
- Born: 20 September 1982 (age 44)
- Origin: Hamburg, Germany
- Genres: classical rock; ambient; electronic rock
- Labels: Erased Tapes; Leiter
- Website: nilsfrahm.com

Nils Frahm (born 20 September 1982) is a German musician, composer, and record producer based in Berlin. He is known for combining classical and electronic music and for an unconventional approach to the piano in which he mixes a grand piano, upright piano, Roland Juno-60, Rhodes piano, drum machines, and Moog Taurus.

In addition to his solo work, Frahm has released collaborations with such notable performers as Ólafur Arnalds, F. S. Blumm, Anne Müller, and Woodkid. With Frederic Gmeiner and Sebastian Singwald, he records and performs as Nonkeen.

== Biography ==
Frahm had an early introduction to music. His father, Klaus Frahm, was a photographer who also designed covers for ECM Records. He grew up near Hamburg, where he learned the styles of the classical pianists as well as contemporary composers. At school he used mixing boards and was very interested in the quality of recorded sound. He studied classical piano for 8 years under Nahum Brodsky, the protégé of the protégé of Tchaikovsky, who lived in a neighbouring village. In 2006, rather than pursue an orchestra career, Frahm moved to Berlin as a jobbing technician.

Frahm's earlier solo piano works Wintermusik (2009) and The Bells (2009) gained him attention, but it was his 2011 release Felt that was met with critical acclaim. It was his first studio album on Erased Tapes, which has released his music since. It was followed by the solo synthesizer EP Juno; and by Screws (2012), recorded while Frahm was recovering from a thumb injury, and which was offered as a free download to fans on his birthday. His follow-up to Juno, titled Juno Reworked (2013), featured guest reworks by Luke Abbott and Chris Clark.

Frahm's album Spaces (2013) was made of sound collages of live recordings from various venues spanning two years.

In December 2013, Frahm released his first music book, Sheets Eins (Sheets One), published by Manners McDade. In 2016 the follow-up Sheets Zwei was released.

In 2014, Frahm announced his new piano "Una Corda", specially designed and made for him by David Klavins. It weighs under 100 kg and has one string per key. (Standard pianos have from one to three strings per key.)

His album Solo (2015), an improvised single take with no overdubs, was later recorded on the "Modell 370", a 370 cm high vertical piano also made by David Klavins. It was one of 19 records nominated for the IMPALA Album of the Year Award.

A condensed version of Frahm's single "More" was featured in the trailer for the video game Assassin's Creed Unity at Gamescom.

In 2015, Frahm composed his first original film score, for the German film Victoria, a 140-minute continuous take directed by Sebastian Schipper. He also collaborated with Woodkid on the critically acclaimed short film Ellis directed by JR which was released in October 2015.

In the same year, Frahm created Piano Day, celebrated on the 88th day of the year (due to the standard piano's 88 keys). The event's first project was the construction, with David Klavins, of the Modell 450 piano, the successor to the Modell 370.

In February 2016, Frahm and childhood friends Frederic Gmeiner and Sebastian Singwald, as the band Nonkeen, released The Gamble, followed by its companion release Oddments of the Gamble in August 2016. Pitchfork described the album as "charmingly patched together and messy as it is well-paced and dynamic". The material was recorded over eight years while the artwork was produced by Frahm's father.

In 2016, Frahm curated Possibly Colliding at the Barbican Centre in London, featuring a weekend of music, art and films.

I'm interested in how human beings react in certain situations, and what music does to people's emotions. How we can change people's attitudes with tones. After I've played a good concert, people leave the room happy. This is something we can give back to the world. When people feel down and like it's all going to shit, at least we can give them some music and change their attitude so people don't think it's all shit... That's my religion. – Nils Frahm

== Equipment ==
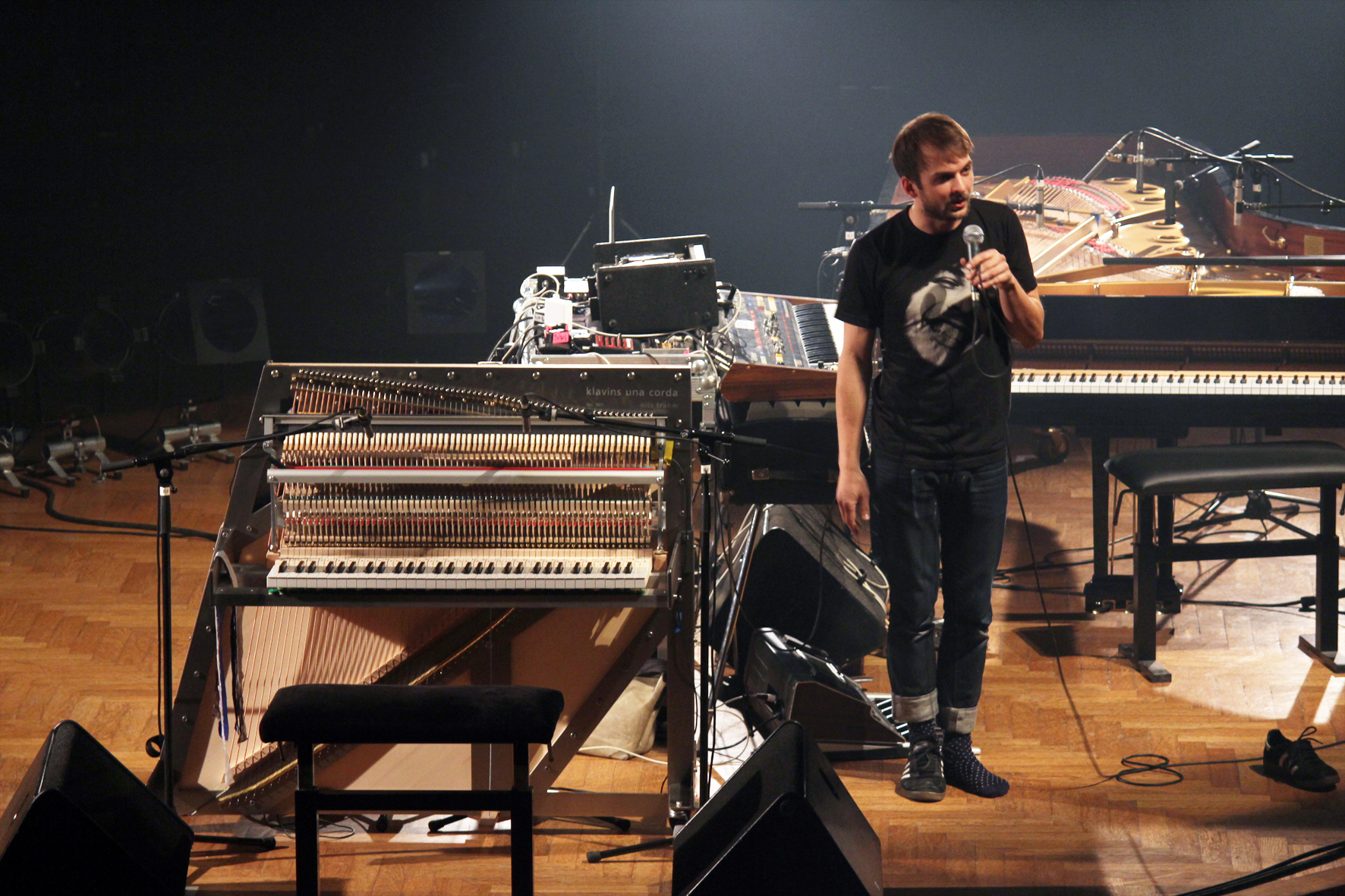
Nils Frahm and the Una Corda (front), Roland Juno-60 (behind him), Fender Rhodes (under the Juno-60), Roland RE-501 (on top behind the Juno-60), Moog Taurus (on the floor behind him) and other equipment

Frahm is known for using vintage gear on his songs and live performances. This is a list of some of his main equipment:

- Binson Echorec 2
- Dynacord VRS-23
- Electro-Harmonix #1 Echo Digital Delay Guitar Effects Pedal
- Electro-Harmonix XO Germanium OD Overdrive
- Ernie Ball Volume Pedal
- Fender Rhodes
- Korg PS-3100
- Mellotron M400
- Melodium 42b
- MFB-522 (drum machine)
- Moog Memorymoog
- Moog MF-102 Moogerfooger Ring Modulator
- Moog Taurus Bass Pedal Synthesizer Version 3
- Nagra IV-S
- Oberheim Four Voice
- Roland Juno 60
- Roland RE-501 Chorus Echo
- Roland SH-2
- Studer A80 Tape Recorder
- Universal Audio 1176 Blue Strip Fet Limiter
- Vermona DRM1 (drum machine)

== Discography ==
=== Solo albums ===
- Streichelfisch (AtelierMusik, 2005)
- Electric Piano (AtelierMusik, 2008)
- The Bells (Kning Disk/Erased Tapes, 2009)
- Felt (Erased Tapes, 2011)
- Screws (Erased Tapes, 2012)
- Spaces (Erased Tapes, 2013)
- Solo (Erased Tapes, 2015)
- All Melody (Erased Tapes, 2018)
- All Encores (Erased Tapes, 2019)
- Empty (Erased Tapes, 2020)
- Tripping with Nils Frahm (Erased Tapes, 2020)
- Graz (Erased Tapes, 2021)
- Old Friends New Friends (Leiter, 2021)
- Music for Animals (Leiter, 2022)
- Day (Leiter, 2024)
- Paris (Leiter, 2024)
- Night (Leiter, 2025)

=== Collaborative albums ===
- 7Fingers (with Anne Müller; Hush/Erased Tapes, 2010)
- Music for Lovers Music Versus Time (with F.S. Blumm; Sonic Pieces, 2010)
- Wonders (with Peter Broderick, as Oliveray; Erased Tapes, 2011)
- Mort Aux Vaches (with Peter Broderick, Machinefabriek, Romke Kleefstra, Anne-Chris Bakker, and Jan Kleefstra; Staalplaat, 2011)
- Music for Wobbling Music Versus Gravity (with F.S. Blumm; Sonic Pieces, 2013)
- Collaborative Works (with Ólafur Arnalds; Erased Tapes, 2015)
- Trance Frendz (with Ólafur Arnalds; Erased Tapes, 2016)
- Tag Eins Tag Zwei (with F.S.Blumm; Sonic Pieces, 2016)
- The Gamble (with Frederic Gmeiner and Sebastian Singwald, as Nonkeen; Durton Studio, 2016)
- Oddments of the Gamble (with Frederic Gmeiner and Sebastian Singwald, as Nonkeen; Durton Studio, 2016)
- 2X1=4 (with F.S. Blumm; Leiter, 2021)
- All Good? (with Frederic Gmeiner and Sebastian Singwald, as Nonkeen; Leiter Verlag, 2024)
- Handling (with F.S. Blumm; Leiter, 2025)

=== Compilation albums ===
- Screws Reworked (Erased Tapes, 2015)
- Late Night Tales: Nils Frahm (Late Night Tales, 2015)

=== Soundtrack albums ===
- Music for the Motion Picture Victoria (Erased Tapes, 2015)
- Ellis (with Woodkid; Erased Tapes, 2016)

=== EPs ===
- My First EP (AtelierMusik, 2008)
- Wintermusik (AtelierMusik, 2009)
- Unter/Über (Erased Tapes, 2010)
- Juno (Erased Tapes, 2011)
- Stare (with Ólafur Arnalds; Erased Tapes, 2012)
- Juno Reworked (Erased Tapes, 2013)
- Loon (with Ólafur Arnalds; Erased Tapes, 2015)
- Encores 1 (Erased Tapes, 2018)
- Encores 2 (Erased Tapes, 2019)
- Encores 3 (Erased Tapes, 2019)

=== Singles ===
- "Dauw" (split with Machinefabriek; Dekorder, 2009)
- "Life Story" / "Love and Glory" (with Ólafur Arnalds; Erased Tapes, 2015)

=== Contributions ===
- DJ Shadow – The Mountain Will Fall ("Bergschrund"; Mass Appeal, 2016)
- Max Richter – Ad Astra (Deutsche Grammophon, 2019)
- Holland Andrews – Doubtless ("Rules"; Leiter, 2022)

=== Theatre collaborations ===
- Laughter in the Dark (with Hotel Pro Forma; 2014)

=== Print ===
- Sheets Eins (Manners Mcdade/Erased Tapes, 2013)
- Sheets Zwei (Manners Mcdade/Erased Tapes, 2016)
- Sheets Drei (Leiter/Manners McDade, 2021)

== Filmography ==
- Victoria (directed by Sebastian Schipper; 2015)
- Ellis (directed by JR; 2015)
- Tripping with Nils Frahm (directed by Benoit Toulemonde; 2020)
