= Never Look Away (soundtrack) =

Never Look Away (Original Motion Picture Soundtrack)

Film score by Max Richter
- Released: 5 October 2018
- Recorded: 2018
- Studio: AIR Studios, London
- Genre: Film score
- Length: 71:04
- Label: Deutsche Grammophon
- Producer: Max Richter

Max Richter chronology
White Boy Rick (2018)	Never Look Away (2018)	Mary Queen of Scots (2018)

Never Look Away (Original Motion Picture Soundtrack) is the film score to the 2018 German romantic drama film Never Look Away directed by Florian Henckel von Donnersmarck. The original score was composed by Max Richter and was recorded at the AIR Studios in London. The album was released through Deutsche Grammophon on 5 October 2018.

== Background ==
Max Richter composed the film score. To record the music, he used pianos with strings 20 feet long to provide the darkest and deepest notes that making the body vibrate. This allowed him to stay subtle in the music so that the audiences who were not accustomed to hearing bombastic musical score, can still feel the sonic themes musically. For the Nazi doctor, Professor Seeband, Richter composed a motif that scales down and down to become deeper and lower, in order to show the deepest and darkest moment of the human soul.

== Release ==
The soundtrack was released through Deutsche Grammophon record label on 5 October 2018.

== Reception ==
Mark Kermode of The Guardian praised the soundtrack of Never Look Away, describing it as "A superbly affecting score by Max Richter helps to negotiate the divide between the occasionally clumsy contrivances of the on-the-nose narrative and the aspirations of a populist movie that strives with some sincerity to celebrate the healing power of art." Jessica Kiang of Variety stated that the film is "smoothed and polished by Max Richter’s stirringly heartfelt score". Boyd van Hoeij of The Hollywood Reporter wrote "Max Richter’s score is lustrous and warm, and helps to compensate for the occasional lack of emotional characterization." Ian Freer of Empire added that the film is "scored with warmth and sensitivity by Max Richter". Demetrios Matheou of Screen International said that Richter "contributes a deeply affecting score".

Donald Clarke of The Irish Times wrote "Max Richter's score is scarcely less delectable." Paddy Kehoe of RTÉ wrote "Max Richter’s orchestral score plays a large part in underlining how you are meant to feel". Justin Chang of Los Angeles Times described it a "lush" "orchestral" score. Anthony Lane of The New Yorker described it "a musical score so tenacious that you feel half bullied into the right emotional response". David Edelstein of Vulture stated that Richter's score consisted of "familiar sawing-string shtick with less than his usual melodic invention".

== Track listing ==
No.	Title	Length
1.	"The Mind's Eye"	2:48
2.	"Kurt & Elisabeth"	2:51
3.	"Enemy Lines"	6:46
4.	"Memory Lane"	2:55
5.	"Sleeping Lions"	2:16
6.	"The Professor's Portrait"	3:21
7.	"The Interrogation"	5:48
8.	"To Belong"	1:31
9.	"1951"	2:27
10.	"Your Pen, Your Sword"	6:05
11.	"A Way Out"	5:38
12.	"Respite"	3:35
13.	"Fat & Felt"	4:43
14.	"Begin Again"	1:49
15.	"Art School"	1:24
16.	"The Exhibition"	5:28
17.	"A Blank Canvas"	2:44
18.	"Consequences"	4:16
19.	"Portraits"	4:39
Total length:		71:04

== Personnel ==
Credits adapted from liner notes:

- Music composer and producer – Max Richter
- Electronics – Max Richter, Air Lyndhurst Orchestra
- Harp – Bryn Lewis
- Piano – Andy Massey
- Protools engineer – John Prestage
- Sound engineer – Rupert Coulson
- Mastering – Götz-Michael Rieth
- Musical assistance – Daniel Elms, Georgina Hay
- Studio creative director – Yulia Mahr
- Artist's manager – Steve Abbott
- Studio manager – Rebecca Drake-Brockman
- Lacquer Cut By – HL
- Copyist – Dave Foster
- A&R coordinator (Deutsche Grammophon) – Anusch Alimirzaie
- Product coordinator (Deutsche Grammophon) – Rafael Walchshofer
- Executive producer (Deutsche Grammophon) – Christian Badzura
- Product development manager (Deutsche Grammophon) – Nanja Maung Yin

== Release history ==
Region	Date	Format(s)	Label(s)	Ref.
Various	5 October 2018	Digital download; streaming	Deutsche Grammophon	
Various	17 May 2019	LP	Deutsche Grammophon	
