= Ad Astra (soundtrack) =

Ad Astra (Original Motion Picture Soundtrack)

Soundtrack album by Max Richter
- Released: October 18, 2019
- Recorded: July 2019
- Studio: AIR (London); Babelsberg Studio (Berlin); Synchron Stage Vienna (Vienna, Austria)
- Genre: Film score
- Length: 126:47
- Label: Deutsche Grammophon
- Producer: Max Richter

Max Richter chronology
Mary Queen of Scots (2018)	Ad Astra (2019)	My Brilliant Friend season 2 (2020)

Singles from Ad Astra (Original Motion Picture Soundtrack)
- 1. "To the Stars" Released: September 20, 2019

Ad Astra (Original Motion Picture Soundtrack) is the soundtrack to the 2019 psychological science fiction film Ad Astra directed by James Gray and starring Brad Pitt, Tommy Lee Jones, Ruth Negga, Liv Tyler and Donald Sutherland. The film's soundtrack consisted of 29 tracks which consisted of music composed by Max Richter and additional music contributed by Lorne Balfe and Nils Frahm. The soundtrack was released digitally through Deutsche Grammophon on October 18, 2019. The album was nominated for Grammy Award for Best Score Soundtrack for Visual Media.

== Development ==
In December 2018, it was announced that Max Richter would compose the film's score. The film's plot mirrors 2001: A Space Odyssey (1968) which Richter shared a personal connection with (he watched the film first as a teenager) and the score had been constructed owing to his admiration for Kubrick's choice of classical music. Richter described that the film consists of two films—a psychological drama revolving around the father-son relationship and the adventure in space—which he liked on the way it superimposed on top of one another that eventually described the musical language. Richter's musical themes for the father-son relationship consisted of traditional instrumentation, while the space portions would consist of epic orchestral and electronic music; however, he thought "What about the big-picture music, what about the physics, and, you know, all of that science?" This resulted him to research about the Voyager 1 and Voyager 2 probes which resulted him to contact the faculties and students of the Department of Physics and Astronomy at the University of Iowa which got data that the Voyager probes recorded on their journey.

The students measured the plasma wave data recorded and transformed it into musical sounds, to utilize it like "a location-recording approach to the electronic music so that when Brad's character goes past a planet, you're actually hearing data collected there, transformed into music." He eventually built computer-modeled instruments out of that data to manipulate and transform the data into actual sounds and then play it into actual instrumentation so that the music is literally embedded in space. Most of them had been made with old mood synths from the late 1960s to channelize the spirit of György Ligeti's work in 2001. To find the balance between the emotional relationship between the father and son and being a space drama, he had "to tow the line between punchy sounds and these tender, introspective moments, where the music has to symbolize and elevate all that isolation Brad is feeling".

Richter employed numerous sounds that evoke traditional religious music, choral writing and glassy, high-frequency tones transcending in some way and evoke the colors. The reverberation is a digital model of the Notre-Dame de Paris, which he described it as "a virtual cathedral [laughs] that all the music is being played through". For two of the themes: "Encounter" and "Forced Entry" he put guitar pedals on the orchestra to provide gritty energy, and besides the planetary instruments made from the Voyager data, he used a Moog System 55 synthesizer to provide an analog sound.

Richter recorded the score at the AIR Studios in London, while the orchestra and choir were recorded the Synchron Stage Vienna. Lorne Balfe was brought in during post-production to provide additional music for the film, along with Nils Frahm. Balfe eventually liked the film because of the protagonist where he could relate as a father and son.

== Release ==
On September 20, 2019, in conjunction with the film's release, a single "To the Stars" was released for digital download. Nearly a month after the film's release, Deutsche Grammophon released the 29-track album consisting of 20 tracks from Richter's score, where eight tracks were composed by Balfe and one by Frahm.

== Reception ==
Zanobard Reviews assigned 8 (out of 10) and wrote that "Max Richter and Lorne Balfe have created a breathtakingly atmospheric musical world for Ad Astra—one that makes you feel as if you're floating amongst the stars." A review from The Film Scorer wrote "Though both inhabit the sphere of spacey ambience, Richter opts for a more minimalist approach (which proves the stronger, more engaging portion) while Balfe rounds out the score with a bit more variety, tension, and danger. Together they create a powerfully meditative score that manages to capture both the literal imagery onscreen as well as McBride's ever-present ruminations." Adrian Barr of Backseat Mafia wrote "Ad Astra is an impressive piece of work that tells a story on its own, so immerse yourself and experience its ethereal journey, across vast solar systems to the edge of new worlds." David Edelstein of Vulture wrote "The composer Max Richter's usual ambient wash is cut with ethereal harps and plinks from the piano's highest keys, while sudden silences reverberate with dread." Moira McDonald of The Seattle Times called it as "an insistently throbbing soundtrack contrasting with that curiously flat blue silence of space." Michael Craig of The Glasgow Guardian wrote "a worthy successor to the minimalist style pioneered by the likes of Philip Glass and Steven Reich".

== Track listing ==
Ad Astra (Original Motion Picture Soundtrack) track listing
No.	Title	Music	Length
1.	"To the Stars"	Max Richter	3:30
2.	"Encounter"	Richter	5:18
3.	"Cosmic Drone Gateway"	Richter	2:57
4.	"I Put All That Away"	Richter	3:27
5.	"A Trip to the Moon"	Richter	4:36
6.	"Terra incognita"	Richter	2:49
7.	"Ex luna scientia (Requiem)"	Richter	5:17
8.	"Journey Sequence"	Richter	3:20
9.	"The Rings of Saturn"	Richter	2:57
10.	"The Wanderer"	Richter	4:50
11.	"Erbarme Dich"	Richter	3:38
12.	"Forced Entry"	Richter	2:27
13.	"Preludium"	Richter	4:02
14.	"Resonantia"	Richter	3:00
15.	"Let There Be Light"	Richter	2:18
16.	"Ursa Minor (Visions)"	Richter	3:14
17.	"Event Horizon"	Richter	6:13
18.	"Musurgia universalis"	Richter	3:05
19.	"You Have to Let Me Go"	Richter	5:57
20.	"Tuesday (Voiceless)"	Richter	21:07
21.	"Opening"	Lorne Balfe	2:37
22.	"Briefing"	Balfe	2:32
23.	"Space Journey"	Balfe	2:39
24.	"Rover Ride"	Balfe	2:51
25.	"Pirate Attack"	Balfe	2:48
26.	"Orbs"	Balfe	3:44
27.	"Underground Lake"	Balfe	2:15
28.	"Trip to Neptune"	Balfe	5:02
29.	"Says"	Nils Frahm	8:17
Total length:			126:47

== Accolades ==
Accolades for Ad Astra (Original Motion Picture Soundtrack)
Award	Date of ceremony	Category	Recipients	Result	Ref.
Florida Film Critics Circle	December 23, 2019	Best Score	Max Richter	Nominated	
Grammy Awards	March 14, 2021	Best Score Soundtrack for Visual Media	Ad Astra – Max Richter	Nominated	
St. Louis Film Critics Association	December 15, 2019	Best Score	Max Richter	Nominated	
