= Music for Animals =

Studio album by Nils Frahm
- Released: 23 September 2022
- Recorded: 2020–2022
- Length: 186:35
- Label: Leiter Verlag
- Producer: Nils Frahm

Nils Frahm chronology
Old Friends New Friends (2021)	Music for Animals (2022)

Music for Animals is a studio album by German musician Nils Frahm. It was released on 23 September 2022 by Leiter Verlag.

== Critical reception ==
Professional ratings
Aggregate scores
Source	Rating
Metacritic	72/100
Review scores
Source	Rating
AllMusic	4/5 stars
Pitchfork	6.4/10
PopMatters	7/10
Uncut	7/10

Music for Animals was met with "generally favorable" reviews from critics. At Metacritic, which assigns a weighted average rating out of 100 to reviews from mainstream publications, this release received an average score of 72, based on 6 reviews.

Writing for Uncut, Piers Martin wrote: "The Piano Day founder eschews the piano for these 10 pieces, two of which nudge the half-hour mark, preferring to conjure a generally downcast mood of slowly unfurled tones and drones, through which chinks of light can be glimpsed occasionally."

== Track listing ==
Disc One
No.	Title	Length
1.	"The Dog With 1000 Faces"	26:21
2.	"Mussel Memory"	13:27
3.	"Seagull Scene"	13:09

Disc Two
No.	Title	Length
1.	"Sheep In Black and White"	24:47
2.	"Stepping Stone"	18:14
3.	"Briefly"	27:02

Disc Three
No.	Title	Length
1.	"Right Right Right"	7:29
2.	"World of Squares"	15:02
3.	"Lemon Day"	18:31
4.	"Do Dream"	22:36

== Charts ==
Chart performance for Music for Animals
Chart (2022)	Peak position
Belgian Albums (Ultratop Flanders)	125
Belgian Albums (Ultratop Wallonia)	82
German Albums (Offizielle Top 100)	29
Scottish Albums (Official Charts)	29
Swiss Albums (Schweizer Hitparade)	38
UK Independent Albums (Official Charts)	12
