= The Uprising (soundtrack) =

2026 film soundtrack album

The Uprising (Original Motion Picture Soundtrack)

Film score by Volker Bertelmann
- Released: 11 September 2026
- Recorded: 2026
- Studios: AIR Studios, London; Eiffel Art Studios, East Connection Music Recording, Budapest; Synchron Stage, Vienna
- Genre: Film score
- Length: 64:20
- Label: Back Lot Music
- Producer: Volker Bertelmann

Volker Bertelmann chronology
De Gaulle (2026)	The Uprising (2026)	Verity (2026)

The Uprising (Original Motion Picture Soundtrack) is the film score composed by Volker Bertelmann to the 2026 film The Uprising directed by Paul Greengrass. The original score features 28 tracks and was released under the Back Lot Music label on 11 September 2026.

== Background ==
Volker Bertelmann composed the score for The Uprising in his maiden collaboration with Greengrass. Bertelmann had liked the film story as it drew parallels with the current period and offered insights of how power was wielded in political life centuries ago and the current similiarties. He added that the major challenge was to find the modern approach while scoring a 14th century medieval era and capturing the raw authenticity of that period without leaning further into the thriller genre. To achieve this, he recorded cellos and distorted it to provide a dystopian era while at the same time, giving a touch of modern bagpipe atmosphere, to lend the music a hint of the tribal character. Most of the music revolved around a simple fifth interval, and retained this a fundamental foundation.

Greengrass wrote lyrics for few songs with Bertelmann, which was his first for a feature film although he had wrote lyrics for individual non film songs. Greengrass wanted a march song to be featured in the film, as part of the story being the story of the march and reconsidered on how people sang march numbers, which were mostly religious songs, mixture of hymns as well as simple folk songs and protest songs. Greengrass referenced Bloody Sunday (2002), his own directorial which was set in Northern Ireland, and also featured protest songs sung by people in the march, which resulted in those march numbers being a foundational part of the film.

== Release ==
The soundtrack was released through Back Lot Music on 11 September 2026.

== Reception ==
James Southall of Movie Wave wrote "It's perhaps functional as film music at the most basic level, but its ambition is so limited and as an album it is very much not for me." Pete Hammond of Deadline Hollywood wrote that Bertelmann's score "keeps this moving with an urgent pace that doesn't quit". Marshall Shaffer of Slant Magazine wrote that Bertelmann's "maximalist score" is "a symbol of the political establishment refers to the commoners as 'deplorables'."

Kyle Smith of The Wall Street Journal stated "Even more awful is the generic pounding of the musical score by Volker Bertelmann, which even if all of the other elements were in place would serve to make the movie feel second-rate." Meredith Loftus of Collider wrote "Not to be missed is composer Volker Bertelmann score; he brings his signature style to the film's music, enhancing the peasants' plight and desperation for justice." Chris Bumbray of JoBlo.com wrote "Volker Bertelmann's score is hard-driving".

== Track listing ==
No.	Title	Length
1.	"Uprising Ouverture"	2:45
2.	"Enough"	2:10
3.	"Rising Up"	2:20
4.	"Confrontation"	3:39
5.	"Moving Together"	1:10
6.	"Place for a Miracle"	1:10
7.	"Carriages Approaching"	1:55
8.	"The King's Arrival"	2:03
9.	"Parley"	2:08
10.	"Return to Your Homes"	2:35
11.	"The Book of Doomsday"	2:10
12.	"Three Columns"	1:31
13.	"King"	1:21
14.	"Meet Your King"	2:36
15.	"Petitions"	5:31
16.	"Gates of Hell"	2:59
17.	"Plundering"	1:26
18.	"Not Alone"	2:06
19.	"Horse Chase"	2:32
20.	"Your Charters"	2:17
21.	"The Trap"	2:44
22.	"The Pitfall"	2:32
23.	"Battlefield"	1:34
24.	"Grief"	1:43
25.	"Ambush"	1:48
26.	"The Duel"	2:17
27.	"No Kings"	3:11
28.	"Freeman"	2:07
Total length:		64:20

== Personnel ==
Credits adapted from Film Music Reporter:

- Music composer and producer: Volker Bertelmann
- Music editor: Richard Armstrong
- Additional music editor: Neil Stemp
- Additional arrangement: Paul Müller Reyes
- Score co-producers: Paul Müller Reyes, Lambert Windges
- Score mixer: Daniel Kresco
- Publishing: Pine & Oak Publishing
- Lead orchestrators: Jan Andrees, Gregor Keienburg, Raffael Seyfried
- Orchestrators: Justus Berger, Florian Hanke, Roman Maier, Florian Sonnleitner
- Assistant orchestrators: Anna Ljungberg, Johannes von Barsewisch
- Pro-tools engineers: Julian Schwiebert, Philipp Kaminsky, Ozan Tekin, Alexander Nikoleit, Antonia Beeskow, Benedikt Wild, Lennart Saathoff, Simon Waskow, Paul Wunder
- Solo viola: Karina Michels
- Solo violin: Margaret Hermant, Karina Michels
- Additional violin: Camille Aubrée
- Solo cello: Laura Wiek
- Additional cello: Ben Winkler
- Contrabass: Julian Schwiebert
- Vocals: Laura Totenhagen
- Additional effects vocals: Paul Müller Reyes
- Cristal Baschet: Thomas Bloch
- Piano: Volker Bertelmann

Recorded at the Opera Eiffel Art Studio by East Connection Music Recording

- Strings orchestra: Budapest Art Orchestra
- Conductor: Peter Pejtsik
- Recording engineer: Gabor Buczko
- Digital recordist: David Lukacs
- Session producer: Miklos Lukacs

Recorded at Vienna Synchron Stage

- Orchestral brass: Vienna Synchron Orchestra
- Conductor: Gottfried Rabl
- French horns: Luis Barbé, Peter Erdei, Valentin Eschmann, Robert Kis, Andras Korsos, Beata Olah, Jan Smutny, Viliam Vojcik, Yuquan Wang
- Trumpets and flugelhorns: Marc Hood, Miklos Illyes, Andreas Meissl
- Tenor, bass and contrabass trombones: Norbert Czeilinger, Matthew Herrmann, Pablo Marin Reyes, Bernhard Plos, Jakob Polaschek, Michael Rattenschlager, Alexander Tauber
- Bass and contrabass trombone: Nandor Vincze
- Scoring engineer: Martin Weismayr
- Pro Tools operator: Lukas Lützow
- Orchestra contractor: Marton Barka
- Technical manager: Roland Tscherne
- Assistant technical manager: Cameron Masters
- Stage monitor mixer: Stephan Huber
- Music preparation and librarians: Stefan Höll, Sugi Shin
- Vienna Synchron Stage front desk: Walter Allabauer
- Project coordinator: Astrid Höger

Recorded at AIR Studios, London

- Orchestral percussion: London Contemporary Orchestra
- Percussion: Sam Wilson, Craig Apps
- Copyist: Giles Thornton
- Score engineer: Nick Wollage
- Score recordist: Ashley Andrew-Jones
- Assistant engineer: Joey Price
- LCO recording projects manager: Amy Dodero
- Orchestra manager: Cath Welsby
