= Spaces (Nils Frahm album) =

Live album by Nils Frahm
- Released: 19 November 2013
- Recorded: 2012–2013
- Genre: Avant-garde
- Length: 76:10
- Label: Erased Tapes

Nils Frahm chronology
Screws (2012)	Spaces (2013)	Solo (2015)

Spaces is the seventh studio album by German musician Nils Frahm. It was released on 19 November 2013 on the Erased Tapes record label. It has been described by Frahm as a "collage of field recordings", and a sound collage of found sounds, and includes music recorded over a 2-year period at different locations using a variety of methods including cassette and reel to reel tapes.

== Critical reception ==
Professional ratings
Aggregate scores
Source	Rating
AnyDecentMusic?	8.4/10
Metacritic	90/100
Review scores
Source	Rating
Clash	9/10
Exclaim!	8/10
Fact	4.5/5
The Irish Times	4/5 stars
Mojo	4/5 stars
The Observer	4/5 stars
Pitchfork	7.8/10
PopMatters	9/10
Resident Advisor	4.5/5
Uncut	9/10

Spaces received general acclaim upon its release. At Metacritic, which assigns a normalised rating out of 100 to reviews from mainstream critics, the album received a score of 90 based on 15 reviews, which is categorised as "universal acclaim".

In his review for Pitchfork, Nick Neyland called it "an absorbing work, full of pensive moments cut together by music that thrives on dovetailing melodies that can be simultaneously mesmerizing and beautiful". In his review on The Arts Desk, Kieron Tyler said the album does not feel like "a conventional live album", but rather a "seamless whole".

Spaces was given an honorable mention in Pitchfork's Albums of the Year 2014, with Nick Neyland remarking, "There are magical properties here, giving Spaces a quality that makes it easy to forget the world outside during its absorbing duration". "Says" was ranked at number 47 on Pitchfork's list of The 100 Best Tracks of 2014, with critic Andrew Rice writing that the track comes closest to capturing "the experience of seeing a Frahm concert".

== Track listing ==
All tracks are written by Nils Frahm.

Spaces track listing
No.	Title	Length
1.	"An Aborted Beginning"	1:34
2.	"Says"	8:18
3.	"Said and Done"	9:39
4.	"Went Missing"	4:59
5.	"Familiar"	5:38
6.	"Improvisation for Coughs and a Cell Phone"	6:44
7.	"Hammers"	3:48
8.	"For – Peter – Toilet Brushes – More"	16:49
9.	"Over There, It's Raining"	3:07
10.	"Unter – Tristana – Ambre"	11:43
11.	"Ross's Harmonium"	3:51
Total length:		76:10

== Personnel ==
Credits adapted from liner notes.

- Nils Frahm – performance, mixing
- Matthias H. Franz Hahn – recording
- Martyn Heyne – recording
- Terence Goodchild – recording
- Mandy Parnell – mastering
- Alexander Schneider – photography
- Tracy Morter – photography
- Stuart Bailes – photography, light design
- Feld – artwork

== Charts ==
Chart performance for Spaces
Chart (2013)	Peak position
UK Independent Albums (Official Charts)	30
