= All Melody =

Studio album by Nils Frahm
- Released: 26 January 2018
- Length: 73:55
- Label: Erased Tapes
- Producer: Nils Frahm

Nils Frahm chronology
| Solo (2015) | All Melody (2018) | All Encores (2019) |

All Melody is the ninth studio album by German musician Nils Frahm. It was released in January 2018 under Erased Tapes Records.

== Critical reception ==
Professional ratings
Aggregate scores
| Source | Rating |
|---|---|
| AnyDecentMusic? | 7.8/10 |
| Metacritic | 83/100 |
Review scores
| Source | Rating |
| AllMusic | 3.5/5 stars |
| The A.V. Club | A− |
| Exclaim! | 8/10 |
| Mojo | 4/5 stars |
| The Observer | 3/5 stars |
| Pitchfork | 7.8/10 |
| Q | 4/5 stars |
| Resident Advisor | 4.0/5 |
| Uncut | 8/10 |
| XLR8R | 8/10 |

According to the review aggregator Metacritic, All Melody received "universal acclaim" based on a weighted average score of 83 out of 100 from 18 critic scores.

=== Accolades ===
| Publication | Accolade | Rank | Ref. |
|---|---|---|---|
| Rough Trade | Top 100 Albums of 2018 | 13 | |

== Track listing ==
All tracks are written by Nils Frahm.

| No. | Title | Length |
|---|---|---|
| 1. | "The whole universe wants to be touched" | 1:57 |
| 2. | "Sunson" | 9:10 |
| 3. | "A place" | 7:01 |
| 4. | "My friend the forest" | 5:16 |
| 5. | "Human range" | 6:59 |
| 6. | "Forever changeless" | 2:47 |
| 7. | "All melody" | 9:30 |
| 8. | "#2" | 9:40 |
| 9. | "Momentum" | 5:20 |
| 10. | "Fundamental values" | 3:50 |
| 11. | "Kaleidoscope" | 8:15 |
| 12. | "Harm hymn" | 4:10 |
| Total length: | | 73:55 |

== Charts ==
=== Weekly charts ===
| Chart (2018) | Peak position |
|---|---|
| Belgian Albums (Ultratop Flanders) | 4 |
| Belgian Albums (Ultratop Wallonia) | 113 |
| French Albums (SNEP) | 176 |
| German Albums (Offizielle Top 100) | 15 |
| Dutch Albums (Album Top 100) | 30 |
| UK Albums (Official Charts) | 21 |
| US Top Classical Albums (Billboard) | 2 |

=== Year-end charts ===
| Chart (2018) | Position |
|---|---|
| Belgian Albums (Ultratop Flanders) | 99 |
| US Top Classical Albums (Billboard) | 35 |
