= Empty (Nils Frahm album) =

Studio album by Nils Frahm
- Released: 28 March 2020
- Length: 35:49
- Label: Erased Tapes

Nils Frahm chronology
All Encores (2019)	Empty (2020)

Professional ratings
Review scores
Source	Rating
Loud and Quiet	8/10

Empty is the eleventh studio album by German musician Nils Frahm. It was released on 28 March 2020 under Erased Tapes Records.

The album consists of piano pieces, and was originally recorded for a short film that Frahm had shot. It was released as part of World Piano Day.

== Track listing ==
All music is composed by Nils Frahm.

Empty track listing
No.	Title	Length
1.	"First Defeat"	3:15
2.	"A Shine"	4:15
3.	"No Step on Wing"	4:47
4.	"The Big O"	4:32
5.	"Second Defeat"	2:08
6.	"A Shimmer"	6:37
7.	"Sonar"	3:49
8.	"Black Notes"	6:26

== Charts ==
Chart performance for Empty
Chart (2020)	Peak position
UK Independent Albums (Official Charts)	33
