= Ferndorf (album) =

Studio album by Hauschka
- Released: October 7, 2008
- Recorded: October 2007 – March 2008
- Genre: Electronic, experimental
- Length: 44:04
- Label: Fat Cat
- Producer: Hauschka

Hauschka chronology
Room to Expand (2007)	Ferndorf (2008)	Snowflakes and Carwrecks (2008)

Ferndorf is the fourth studio album by avant-garde musician Hauschka, released on October 7, 2008. The album features more electronic and instrumental overdubs than previous efforts, while still retaining the prepared piano sound Hauschka is usually associated with. On release, it received generally positive reviews from critics.

== Reception ==
Professional ratings
Review scores
Source	Rating
Allmusic	4/5 stars
Pitchfork Media	(7.8/10)
PopMatters	8/10 stars
Drowned In Sound	7/10 stars
Tiny Mix Tapes	7/10 stars

Upon release the album garnered generally positive reviews, and has a Metacritic of 76, based on 11 reviews. Pitchfork commented how "Ferndorf as a record isn't something to get you hearing music in a new way or an open up a new world, but it does succeed very nicely for what it is.", while Allmusic stated how similar it is to the work of fellow Fat Cat musician Max Richter, and how "both have a remarkable talent for honing [sic] in on the sweet spot where classical, avant-garde, electronic and pop music meet."

== Track listing ==
No.	Title	Length
1.	"Blue Bicycle"	5:35
2.	"Morgenrot"	3:29
3.	"Rode Null"	4:00
4.	"Freibad"	4:29
5.	"Barfuss Durch Gras"	4:18
6.	"Heimat"	3:40
7.	"Nadelwald"	3:34
8.	"Schönes Madchen"	3:40
9.	"Eltern"	4:21
10.	"Alma"	2:40
11.	"Neuschnee"	3:41
12.	"Weeks of Rain"	2:37
