= Felt (Nils Frahm album) =

Studio album by Nils Frahm
- Released: 7 October 2011
- Studio: Durton Studio
- Genres: Electronic, classical
- Length: 43:17
- Label: Erased Tapes
- Producer: Nils Frahm

Nils Frahm chronology
Unter/Über (2010)	Felt (2011)	Juno (2011)

Felt is a 2011 album by German composer Nils Frahm. It was released on 7 October 2011 on Erased Tapes records. The album's name refers to Frahm placing felt on the strings of his piano, initially to dampen the sound for nighttime playing and later because he liked the sound it produced. The album was also recorded with microphones placed deep within the piano, which was seen to provide a more intimate sound.

== Reception ==
Professional ratings
Aggregate scores
Source	Rating
Metacritic	87/100
Review scores
Source	Rating
Drowned In Sound	9/10 stars
MusicOMH	4.5/5 stars
BBC Music	Positive
PopMatters	8/10 stars
Clash	8/10 stars

On its release the album received critical acclaim. At Metacritic, which assigns a normalised rating out of 100 to reviews from mainstream critics, the album has received a score of 87, based on 5 reviews which is categorised as "Universal Acclaim". In his 8/10 review for PopMatters, Mike Schiller said the album was "sublime and beautiful" and "a humble little masterpiece". Al Horner at Drowned in Sound called Felt, "a body of music so intimate and hushed you can practically hear the microphones breathing" and "a captivating listen".

== Track listing ==
All tracks are written by Nils Frahm.

Felt track listing
No.	Title	Length
1.	"Keep"	3:27
2.	"Less"	5:33
3.	"Familiar"	3:30
4.	"Unter"	2:37
5.	"Old Thought"	5:49
6.	"Snippet"	4:26
7.	"Kind"	3:23
8.	"Pause"	5:36
9.	"More"	8:56
Total length:		43:17

== Personnel ==
Credits adapted from liner notes.

- Nils Frahm – recording, mixing
- Emil Thomsen – mastering
- Lupo – lacquer cut
- Benjamin Maus – artwork
- Torsten Posselt – artwork
