= David Klavins =

German-Latvian piano maker (born 1954)

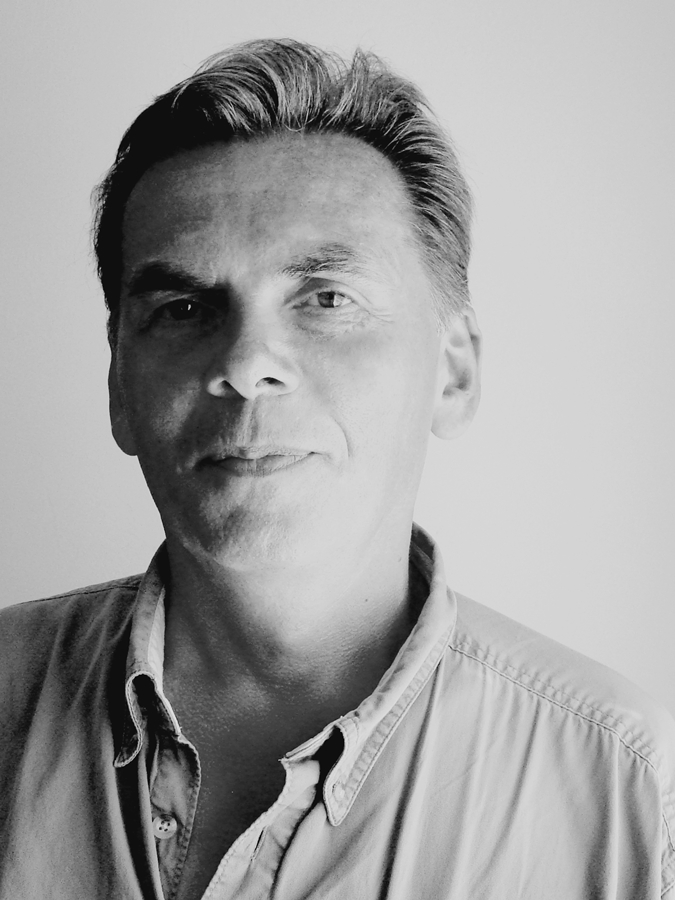
- The piano maker David Klavins (2010)
- Born: 5 July 1954 (age 71); Bonn

David Klavins (born July 5, 1954) is a German-Latvian piano maker. With his "Modell 370" (1987) he introduced the world's largest piano. In 2012, a digital version of the Modell 370 was published as a software instrument under the name "The Giant".

== Life ==
In 1945, David Klavins's parents, Paulis and Zeltite, arrived as refugees from Latvia in Germany. David is the third of eight children. His mother played the piano and his father was a violinist. After finishing middle school in 1971, David Klavins started an apprenticeship as a piano maker at the Wilhelm Schimmel Pianofortefabrik in Braunschweig. In 1976, he started his own business, the "Klavierhaus Klavins" in Bonn. He mainly restored and sold used home and grand pianos. In 1980, he became a master craftsman, which, in Germany, meant that he could officially train apprentices.

== Modell 370 ==
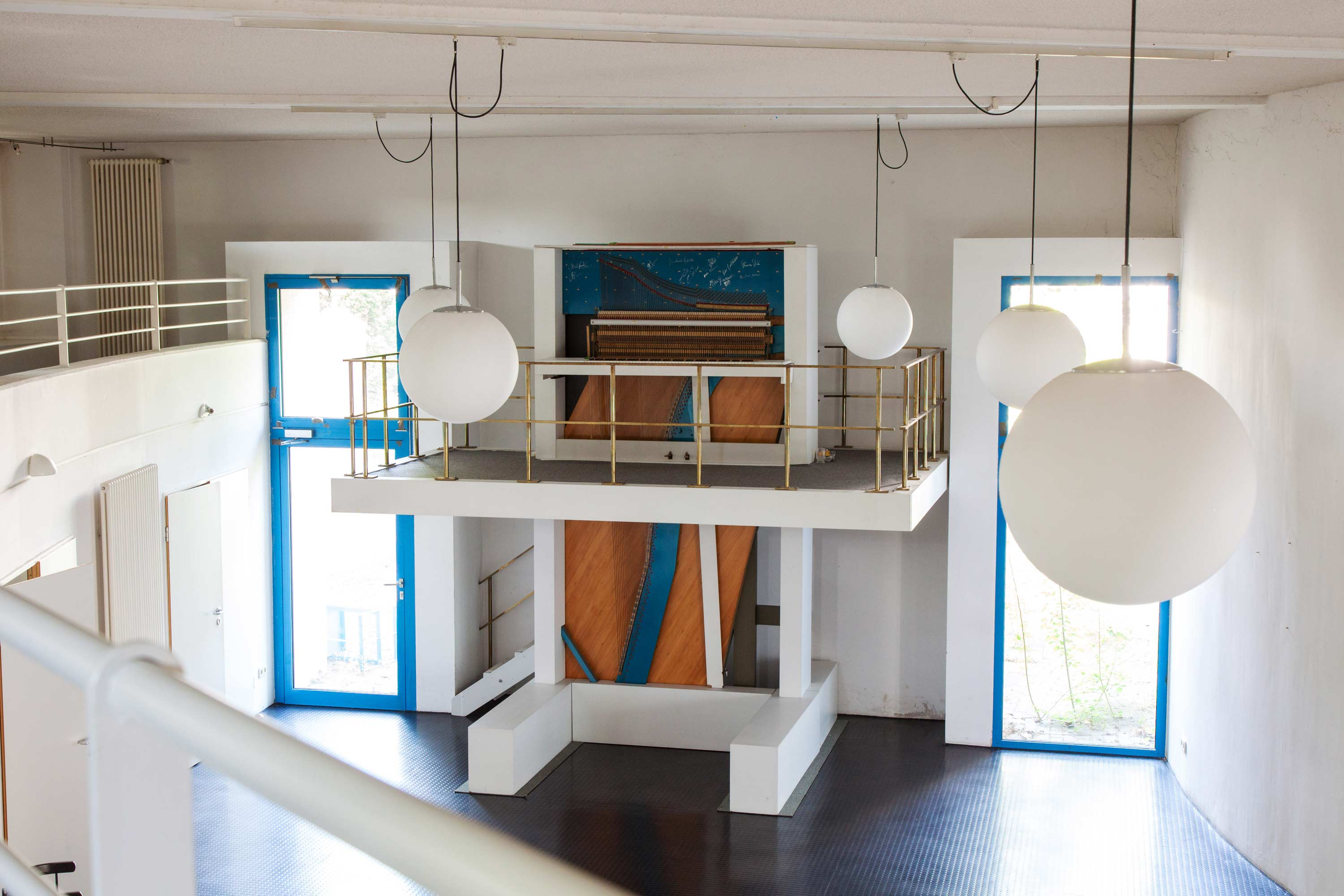
David Klavins's two-floor-tall piano "Modell 370".

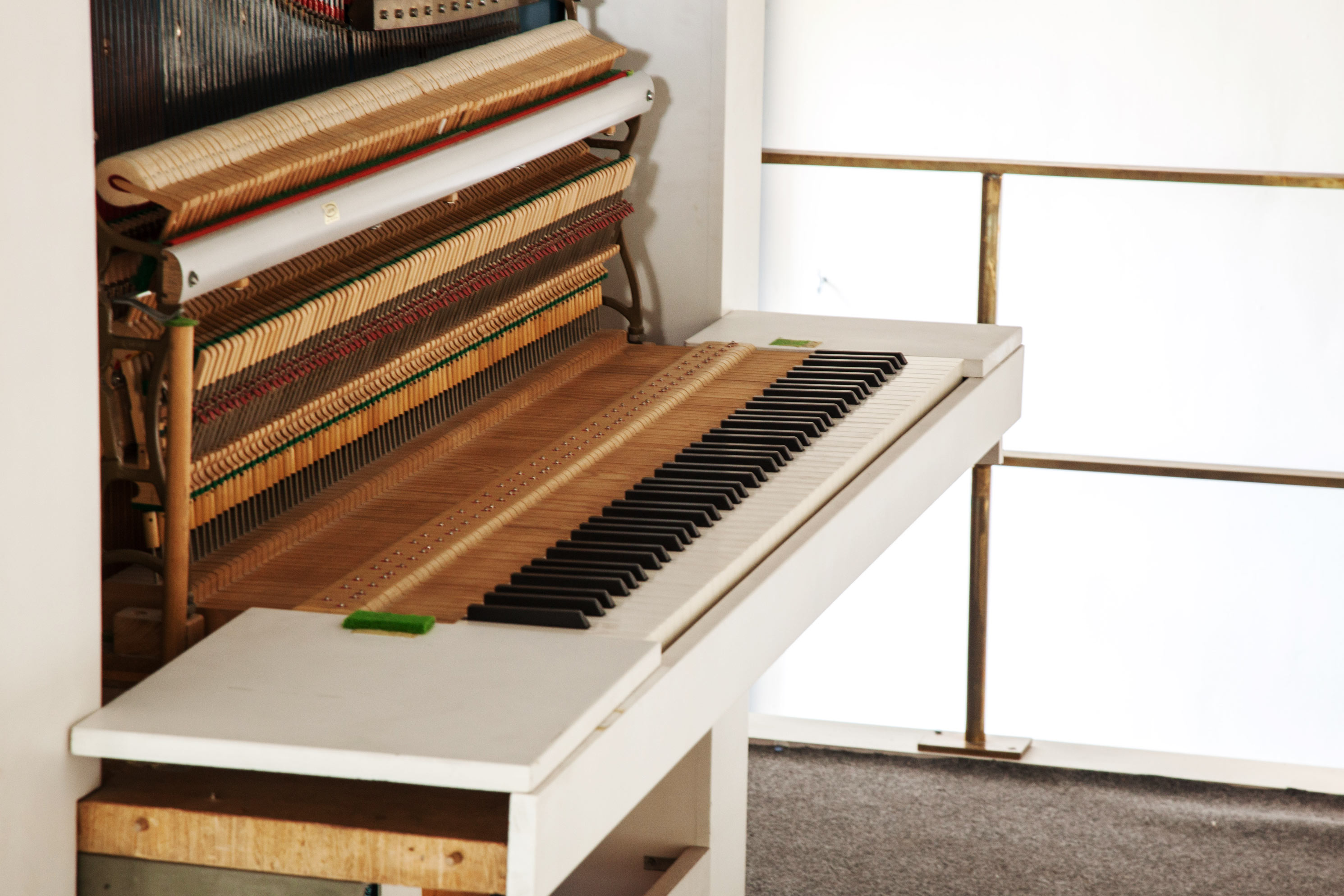
Detail of Modell 370, top floor.

While restoring and studying the architecture of grand pianos, Klavins became a critic of the traditional way to construct these instruments. He stated that the materials used in common piano making are outdated and don't reflect the current status of materials science. With this in mind, Klavins designed a piano with a size, shape and interior construction based on modern knowledge of acoustics – rather than the historical construction guidelines used in traditional piano making. In November 1987, he presented the "Klavins Klavier Modell 370" to the public in the German city of Bonn. It had its name from its height: 370 centimetres. In contrast to horizontally built grand pianos, the Modell 370 is laid out vertically. It weighs two tons and stretches over two floors. The piano player sits on the bench in the top floor, while the main part of the strings and the resonance body continue below his feet. Due to this construction, the sounding board, responsible for the acoustic breadth of the instrument, is of double size of an ordinary concert grand piano. This leads to a rich sound and a larger spectrum of overtones. The lowest bass string is 3.03 meters long – about three times longer than in a standard piano. As of 2012, the Modell 370 is the largest piano worldwide.

The instrument was first played to the public by the classical pianist Cyprien Katsaris. Today it is stored in the Pfleghofsaal of the Institute Of Music Science, University of Tübingen. Klavins never intended to produce the instrument in series. Many pianists asked Klavins for a (horizontally built) grand piano with his construction technique. This led to the "Modell 408", which was scheduled to enter production in the summer of 2014. In May 2012, the Berlin music software developer Native Instruments introduced the Modell 370 as a software instrument, sampled by Uli Baronowsky, under the name "The Giant".

== Una Corda ==
Klavins tunes his Una Corda piano

On 7 June 2014, working closely with Nils Frahm, the Una Corda piano was released. The construction was inspired by building a portable upright piano similar to Model 370, which features an open design with no cabinet, and 64 individually stringed keys, altogether weighing at 100 kg. This further led to a live showcase on 10 June 2014 with Nils Frahm in Michelberger Hotel, Berlin. On 12 December 2015 Uli Baronowsky and Galaxy Instruments collaborated with Native Instruments releasing a fully realized virtual instrument that closely captures the original Una Corda.

== Modell 450 ==
Announced by Piano day in 2015 and again working with Nils Frahm, Klavins was developing a vertical concert grand piano, being 4.5m high and weighing over a tonne.

== Music label ==
In order to publish music played on the Modell 370, David Klavins, in 1988, founded his own record label, "Klavins Music", which was later bought by "Elite Music" in Taiwan and BMG-Asia. Among the concert pianists performing on that label were Michael Ponti, Thomas Duis, Joachim Arnold, Gülsin Onay, Michael Denhoff, Simon Nabatov and Wadik Polyonow.

== Years of travel ==
In 1988 David Klavins moved to Latvia, the birth country of his parents, and worked in politics. In July 2006 he traveled to Orange County, California, where he entered into a partnership with Liana Marie Sive, to pursue his piano research. In August 2006 Sive and Klavins moved their research operations to Woodbridge, Connecticut. In October 2007 Sive and Klavins formally organized their research activities as PianoTectonics, Inc. Mr. Klavins was appointed Chief Operating Officer of the company, and for the next three years he engaged in intensive research that led to the development, among other things, of the technology for the Una Corda and M450 pianos. In 2011 he moved to Balingen, Germany and since late 2016 has resided in Vác, Hungary.
