= Alev Lenz =

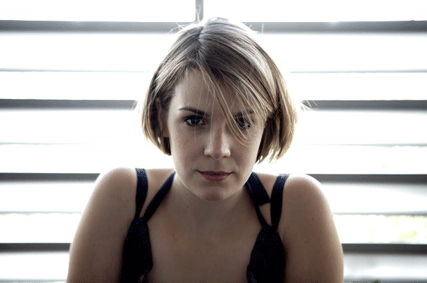

Background information
- Born: 17 January 1982 (age 44); Munich, Bavaria, Germany
- Genres: Acoustic; Pop
- Occupations: singer, songwriter, vocalist and producer
- Years active: 2001–present
- Labels: SA Recordings; Spitfire Audio
- Website: alevlenz.com

Alev Lenz (born 17 January 1982, in Munich) is a Turkish–German, Grammy-nominated record producer, singer-songwriter and composer.

== Career ==
Lenz, the daughter of a Turkish mother and a German father, signed her first publishing deal with BMG Music Publishing in 2001 with the first recordings of her former band "Alev". At first her father was against her plans to become a musician. After three years of touring and the release of "We live in Paradise", Lenz left the band.

Lenz also left Germany to go to New York City to perform and her original new material. She played Open Mikes and her first concerts as Alev Lenz Solo.

Lenz achieved some success in Turkey, mainly through her several TV appearances on Turkish television on the shows of the popular Turkish showmaster Okan Bayülgen.

Lenz founded her own record company with her management and Groove Attack/Rough Trade in 2008. Her debut album Storytelling Piano Playing Fräulein was released on 13 February 2009, and is available in stores in Germany, Austria and Switzerland and worldwide on iTunes and Amazon.com. The album was produced in Berlin with Don Philippe, a member of the group Freundeskreis. Her collaborator on her second album was acclaimed drummer and multi-instrumentalist Samuli Kosminen of Mùm and mixed by Jas Shaw (Simian Mobile Disco).

Since the release of her debut album back in 2009, in her home country of Germany, Alev has kept herself busy with gigs in London, New York and across Germany, as well as composing soundtracks for several high-profile German films, and collaborating with and producing for established artists such as Anoushka Shankar on the Grammy-nominated Album, 'Land of Gold’ (Deutsche Grammophon), and Grammy-nominated EP, 'Love Letters’ (Mercury KX) and Roomful of Teeth. Lenz's big breakthrough came in 2016 when her song ‘Fall into Me’ was used in Charlie Brooker’s Black Mirror episode, ’Hated in the Nation’. Lenz has since been played on NPR All Songs Considered, WNYC New Sounds and mentioned by the New York Times, as the vocal ensemble Roomful of Teeth have since taken up her song into their live programme. Most recently Alev's single ‘May the Angels’ from ‘3’ featured on season two of critically acclaimed Netflix series Dark. The series features songs from Peter Gabriel, Agnes Obel and Apparat, with a score composed by Ben Frost. ‘Splendid Soldiers’, 'Fall into Me'’s Album version, has been featured on the third season of The Rain. Alev has also contributed vocals to Volker Bertelmann's (Hauschka) score for the films Downhill, Stowaway and The Old Guard (featuring Dustin O'Halloran).

Lenz's third studio album, 3, was released on Spitfire Audio's SA Recordings, and sample libraries were released in conjunction with the album release.

== Discography ==
Albums

Solo

- Storytelling Piano Playing Fräulein (2009)
- Two-Headed Gïrl (2016)
- 3 (2019)
- 4 in a Cycle of Thirds (2026)

Soundtracks

- A Year Ago in Winter (2008) (Caroline Link)
- The Wild Chicks and Life (2009)
- Wedding Fever in Campobello (2009)
- Bon appétit (2010)
- Turkish for Beginners (2012)
- The Dead and the Living (2012)
- The Girl with Nine Wigs (2013)
- King Ordinary (2013)
- Hated in the Nation (Black Mirror) (2016)

Producer

- Two-Headed Gïrl (2016)
- 3 (2019)
- Love Letters Anoushka Shankar (2020)
- Risha Ruba Shamshoum (2021)
- Love Letters P.S. Anoushka Shankar (2021)

With Alev

- We live in Paradise
- Broken
- Breakable
