= A House of Dynamite (soundtrack) =

A House of Dynamite (Soundtrack from the Netflix Film)

Film score by Volker Bertelmann
- Released: October 24, 2025
- Recorded: 2025
- Genre: Film score
- Length: 62:36
- Label: Netflix Music
- Producer: Volker Bertelmann

Volker Bertelmann chronology
Dead of Winter (2025)	A House of Dynamite (2025)	Ballad of a Small Player (2025)

A House of Dynamite (Soundtrack from the Netflix Film) is the film score to the 2025 film A House of Dynamite, directed by Kathryn Bigelow. The film features an ensemble cast led by Idris Elba, Rebecca Ferguson, Gabriel Basso, Jared Harris, and Tracy Letts. The score was composed by Volker Bertelmann and released through Netflix Music on October 24, 2025.

== Development ==
In June 2025, it was announced that Volker Bertelmann would compose the film score for A House of Dynamite. Bertelmann later explained that when he first started working on the film, he found everything to be so precise. However, only after watching the film and discussing it with every crew member did he feel that there was a sense of "precision with a looseness", which he found appealing. Bertelmann admitted that by watching the film multiple times, he could identify the loose ends that connected the threads of the screenplay. He noted the film's complications, particularly its documentary style, which required him to be entirely realistic and careful with the music.

On creating the score for the first chapter, Bertelmann was driven by the operation's central threat: an intercontinental missile looming over the state. He elaborated that the first act ran for exactly 18 minutes—mirroring the real-world time it would take for a missile to strike its target. To reflect this countdown, Bertelmann used a rhythm of rising and receding waves. He added that these waves grow with each subsequent chapter, providing a dynamic curve over the whole film, but also within each chapter. As the story narrowed towards its moral center, the score further evolved, referencing the mood shift to an internal conflict when the president was about to make a crucial decision. He found it exciting to connect the three chapters, noting that while they all described the same core event, they had to escalate and get bolder as the film progressed.

Bertelmann felt he needed small motifs that he could weave between the dialogue, given that the film was nearly dialogue-driven. He recalled that his Academy Award-winning score for All Quiet on the Western Front (2022) was built on only three notes. Based on this minimal approach, he wrote four-to-five-note motifs for the new score, by repeating smaller fragments. The score was recorded at the AIR Studios in London. Bertelmann experimented with low woodwinds, flutes and brass instruments to replicate the moaning of a horn. He specifically recalled a baritone saxophone player humming into the saxophone while playing it, a sound Bertlemann liked. He further asked the saxophonist to double the string lines, making the resulting sound more "animalistic and alarming". He also noticed the players' knowledge about microphones, which prompted him to bring some of his old microphones for the recording sessions.

== Release ==
The first track from the album, "Inclination Is Flattening", was released as a single on October 17, 2025. The full soundtrack followed, released through Netflix Music on October 24.

== Reception ==
- Justin Chang of The New Yorker wrote, "For A House of Dynamite, [Volker Bertelmann] has composed yet another attack of the groans, and it has the effect of making some of the dialogue sound even more tin-eared than it would in isolation."
- David Rooney of The Hollywood Reporter wrote, "The tightly wound tension is maintained also by Volker Bertelmann's propulsive score, which starts with ominous juddering groans and keeps shapeshifting throughout."
- John Powers of NPR noted that the tonal shifts in Bertelmann's score "keep ratcheting up the tension".
- Eli Friedberg of Slant Magazine wrote of the "relentless decibel-shredding score".
- Glenn Whipp of Los Angeles Times wrote, "Volker Bertelmann's ominous score ramps up the feeling of suffocation".
- Ross Bonaime of Collider admitted that, like his previous scores for All Quiet on the Western Front (2022) and Conclave (2024), "Bertelmann reuses a few notes as a music motif to heighten the tension, but here, it only comes off as absurd the further the film goes."
- Chris Bumbray of JoBlo.com wrote, "Volker Bertelmann provides a powerhouse score."

== Track listing ==
No.	Title	Length
1.	"Inclination Is Flattening"	2:47
2.	"White House"	2:36
3.	"Prenup Is Ironclad"	0:56
4.	"Click Alert"	1:16
5.	"DEFCON 2"	1:07
6.	"Move to PEOC"	2:01
7.	"Negative Impact"	3:02
8.	"Doing Great"	2:24
9.	"Leave If You Can"	1:57
10.	"Your Orders"	1:56
11.	"Hitting a Bullet with a Bullet"	2:35
12.	"Suborbital"	2:04
13.	"61%"	1:38
14.	"Mr. President"	2:54
15.	"Why Does That Matter"	2:52
16.	"Jake"	1:43
17.	"They're Gonna Back Down"	2:16
18.	"Your Orders 2"	1:52
19.	"A House Filled with Dynamite"	2:42
20.	"President to WNBA"	2:28
21.	"Allow to Brief You"	5:00
22.	"Explain the Options"	1:36
23.	"Insanity"	1:45
24.	"Surrender or Suicide"	1:55
25.	"My Orders"	3:13
26.	"No Longer Unimaginable"	6:16
Total length:		62:36

== Accolades ==
Award	Date of ceremony	Category	Recipient(s)	Result	Ref.
Hollywood Music in Media Awards	November 19, 2025	Best Original Score in a Feature Film	Volker Bertelmann	Nominated	
