= Verity (soundtrack) =

2026 film soundtrack album

Verity (Original Motion Picture Soundtrack)

Film score by Volker Bertelmann
- Released: October 2, 2026
- Recorded: 2026
- Studios: Sony Streisand Scoring Stage, Sony Pictures Studios, Culver City, California
- Genre: Film score
- Length: 59:01
- Label: Lakeshore
- Producer: Volker Bertelmann

Volker Bertelmann chronology
| The Uprising (2026) | Verity (2026) | Clayface (2026) |

Verity (Original Motion Picture Soundtrack) is the film score to the 2026 film Verity directed by Michael Showalter based on Colleen Hoover's 2018 novel, starring Anne Hathaway, Dakota Johnson and Josh Hartnett. The film's original score is composed by Volker Bertelmann and released through Lakeshore Records on October 2, 2026, the same day as the film.

== Background ==
In April 2026, it was announced that Volker Bertelmann would compose the score for Verity, in his first collaboration with Michael Showalter. Before their initial meeting, Bertelmann watched an earlier edit of the film for references, and instead of waiting for any guidance or direction, he instinctively wrote a piano melody inspired by the first shot of Verity's house. This piece immediately resonated with the creative team, thereby serving the foundation for the film's overall sonic landscape.

Bertelmann used a single extended theme and continually reshaped its instrumentation, timing and scale to mirror how the audience perception of each characters shift throughout the story. The main theme was designed to connect the characters of Lowen and Verity, and then Bertelmann transformed that melody—by playing it light and other times shifting it to lower, bass-heavy tones—to reflect the similarities of the characters and how their lives collide. The major part of their discussions between Showalter and Bertelmann involved on defining the colors and parameters of the score, ensuring that both of them had similar understanding on the mood and tone of the films.

While Bertelmann's work in thriller films, mostly demanded raw, harsh and minimalistic textures, he went ahead with a classic thriller approach for Verity. Bertelmann was influenced by Alfred Hitchcock as well as European film adaptations of Agatha Christie novels to balance the "lush and warm" tonal palette that intertwined with the underlying tension and mood of the plot. To effectively capture the psychological uncertainty of the plot, he distorted pitch and utilized synths that subtly sped up or slowed down, thereby creating a fundamentally unstable score that uneases the audiences.

== Release ==
The soundtrack was released through Lakeshore Records on October 2, 2026.

== Reception ==
Jonathan Broxton of Movie Music UK wrote "Taken as a whole, Verity is another impressive thriller score from Bertelmann: intelligent, atmospheric, musically coherent, and substantially more interesting than the generic underscore that too often accompanies contemporary psychological thrillers. Its combination of a recurring thematic backbone, dark orchestral weight, piano-driven intimacy, and carefully judged experimentation makes it both dramatically effective and rewarding on album." Filmtracks wrote "Good thriller scores don't have to be so obvious, and the album becomes tiresome fast. Bertelmann continues to show a lack of dynamic range in his scores, yielding monotony rather than the slick, suspenseful melodrama for which his dark inclinations would seem naturally suited." Tim Grierson of Screen International wrote "Volker Bertelmann's jumpy orchestral score constantly hints at diabolical things to come, which is fitting considering that Verity's books focus on deliciously villainous characters getting away with their crimes." Guy Lodge of Variety wrote "composer Volker Bertelmann [...] throws in some zithery Bernard Herrmann stylings."

== Track listing ==
| No. | Title | Length |
|---|---|---|
| 1. | "A Miracle" | 2:03 |
| 2. | "People Like Me" | 1:23 |
| 3. | "How Does This Sound?" | 1:02 |
| 4. | "Research" | 1:08 |
| 5. | "The Lake" | 1:12 |
| 6. | "Villains Point of View" | 2:43 |
| 7. | "Noise" | 1:13 |
| 8. | "Happier Than Ever" | 1:31 |
| 9. | "Becoming a Writer" | 2:53 |
| 10. | "You Are Making Progress" | 1:32 |
| 11. | "Seeing Things" | 2:35 |
| 12. | "Different from You" | 2:22 |
| 13. | "No Longer" | 1:55 |
| 14. | "Feel for You" | 2:55 |
| 15. | "I Lied to You" | 1:17 |
| 16. | "I Want You" | 1:17 |
| 17. | "I Need to Know" | 0:57 |
| 18. | "On the Lake" | 1:53 |
| 19. | "Say Something" | 3:52 |
| 20. | "So Be It" | 1:15 |
| 21. | "Read This" | 4:21 |
| 22. | "Like an Accident" | 3:37 |
| 23. | "Best One Yet" | 0:57 |
| 24. | "Revelations" | 8:17 |
| 25. | "Ending Credits – Verity" | 4:51 |
| Total length: | | 59:01 |

== Personnel ==
Credits adapted from Film Music Reporter:

- Music composer and producer: Volker Bertelmann
- Score co-producers: Philipp Kaminsky, Ben Winkler
- Conductor: Hugh Brunt
- Lead orchestrators: Jan Andrees, Gregor Keienburg, Raffael Seyfried
- Orchestrators: Roman Maier, Florian Sonnleitner
- Assistant orchestrators: Johannes von Barsewisch, Justus Berger, Anna Ljungberg
- Studio: Sony Streisand Scoring Stage
- Recording: Laurence Anslow
- Digital score recordist: Larry Mah
- Mixing: Daniel Kresco
- Supervising music editor: Jason Ruder
- Music editors: Christian Wenger, Shari Johanson
- Score editor: Lambert Windges
- Pro Tools engineers: Lennart Saathoff, Paul Müller Reyes, Alexander Nikoleit, Ozan Tekin, Julian Schwiebert, Antonia Beeskow, Paul Wunder, Benedikt Wild
- Librarian: Mark Graham
- Orchestral contractors: Gina Zimmittti, Whitney Martin
- Music production consultant: Celeste Chada

Featured musicians

- Violin and viola: Karina Michels
- Cello: Laura Wiek
- Additional cello: Ben Winkler
- Piano: Volker Bertelmann

Musicians

- Violins: Ben Jacobson (CM), Luanne Homzy, Lucia Micarelli, Gallia Kastner, Mona Tian, Camille Miller, Ina Veli, Aiko Jimena Richter, Mizuki Takagi, Adrianne Pope, Stephanie Yu, Max Karmazyn, Marisa Kuney, Jessica Guideri, Kevin Kumar, Maya Magub, Songa Lee, Mark Robertson, Kathleen Sloan, Gulia Gurevich, Tamara Hatwan, Maia Jasper White, Michael Siess, Josefina Vergara, Tereza Stanislav, Alyssa Park, Shalini Vijayan, Neel Hammond, Charlie Bisharat, Dennis Kim, Stephanie Matthews, Sarah Thornblade, Yaeri Choi, Sandy Cameron
- Violas: Andrew Duckles, Luke Maurer, Jonah Sirota, Carson Rick, Linnea Powell, Jonathan Moerschel, Rita Andrade, Shawn Mann, David Walther, Diana Wade, Andrew McIntosh, Stefan Smith
- Cellos: Eric Byers, Charlie Tyler, Jacob Braun, Niall Taro Ferguson, Ismael Guerrero, Mia Barcia Colombo, Allan Hon, Leah Hansen, Vanessa Freebairn-Smith, Hillary Smith, Giovanna Clayton, Judy Kang, Chris Ahn
- Basses: Michael Valerio, Nathan Farrington, Ryan Baird, Stephen Pfeifer, Steve Dress, Thomas Harte, Geoffrey Osika, Stephanie Payne
- Horns: Dylan Hart, Mike McCoy, Emily Pesavento, Luke Hilland, Lisa Cherry, Steven Becknell, Adedeji Ogunfolu, Stephanie Thomas, Kaylet Torrez
- Trombones: Alex Iles, Ryan Dragon, Steve Holtman, Byron Sleugh, Ido Meshulam, Phil Keen
- Tuba: Blake Cooper
