= Volker Bertelmann =

German composer and musician (born 1966)

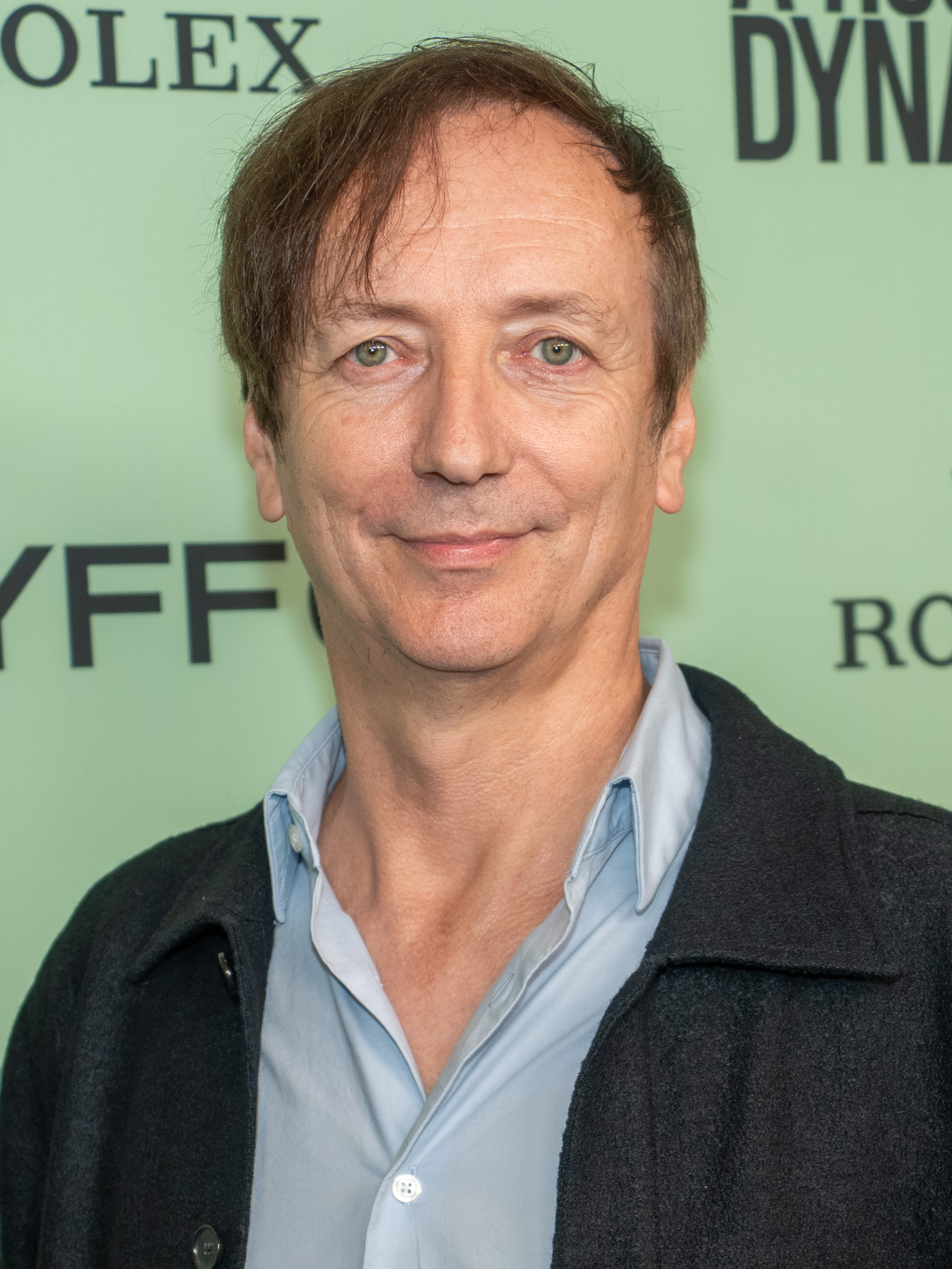
- Bertelmann in 2025

Background information
- Born: Volker Bertelmann; 11 October 1966 (age 60); Kreuztal, West Germany
- Origin: Düsseldorf, Germany
- Genres: Experimental; electronic rock; avant-garde; experimental rock; minimalism; rap rock (early); electronica; ambient; film score
- Occupations: Musician, composer
- Instrument: Vocals · piano · prepared piano · keyboards · synthesizer
- Years active: 1992–present
- Labels: City Slang; Temporary Residence Limited; Sony Classical
- Formerly of: God’s Favorite Dog
- Website: hauschka-net.de

Volker Bertelmann (born 11 October 1966) is a German composer, pianist and former rapper who mainly performs and records under the name Hauschka. He is best known for his compositions for prepared piano. He won an Academy Award and a BAFTA Award for his score for All Quiet on the Western Front (2022).

== Early life ==
Bertelmann was born in Kreuztal, Germany. He grew up in the village of Ferndorf in the district of Siegen-Wittgenstein, North Rhine-Westphalia. The fifth of six children, he discovered piano playing at the age of eight at church service. He began studying classical piano and continued taking lessons for the next ten years.

Bertelmann formed his first rock band when he was fourteen. During the following years he was commissioned to compose music for television and sang in a number of other bands. After leaving school he moved to Cologne, where he began studying medicine and then switched to a course in business economics, but gave up both in order to concentrate on music.

== Career ==
=== 1992–2003: Early career ===
In 1992, Bertelmann and his cousin formed the hip-hop duo God's Favorite Dog, who became known above all for their tracks Love and Pain and Sway. They released an album on Sony Music's Epic label and went on to perform nationally and internationally, among others as a support act for Die Fantastischen Vier. The duo split in 1995 to pursue other directions.

After a period of drifting, Bertelmann moved to Düsseldorf and started making music again, drawing on his years of classical piano training. He composed pieces for piano and released them under the alias Hauschka; he wanted to use an Eastern European-sounding pseudonym and found Bohemian composer Vincenz Hauschka as a reference.

=== 2004–2006: Prepared piano beginnings ===
The first album under the name Hauschka, Substantial, was released in 2004 on the Cologne label Karaoke Kalk, followed in 2005 by The Prepared Piano on the same label. On this second album Bertelmann explored the possibilities of the prepared piano by wedging pieces of leather, felt or rubber between the piano strings, wrapping aluminium foil around the hammers, placing small objects on the strings or joining them together with guitar strings or adhesive tape.

=== 2007–2010: Room to Expand, Ferndorf and Foreign Landscapes ===
In 2007 Bertelmann signed a recording contract with 130701, an imprint of FatCat Records, through which his album Ferndorf was released in 2008.

Following a concert performance with the Magik*Magik Orchestra, Bertelmann decided to integrate other musical instruments into his compositions, and in January 2010 the resulting works were performed in San Francisco by an orchestra led by Minna Choi. With Ian Pellicci as the sound engineer, they were recorded in John Vanderslice's Tiny Telephone Studios. Volker Bertelmann then recorded the piano tracks at Studio Zwei in Düsseldorf, and the album Foreign Landscapes was released on the 130701 label later that year.

=== 2011–2014: Salon des Amateurs, Silfra and film score beginnings ===
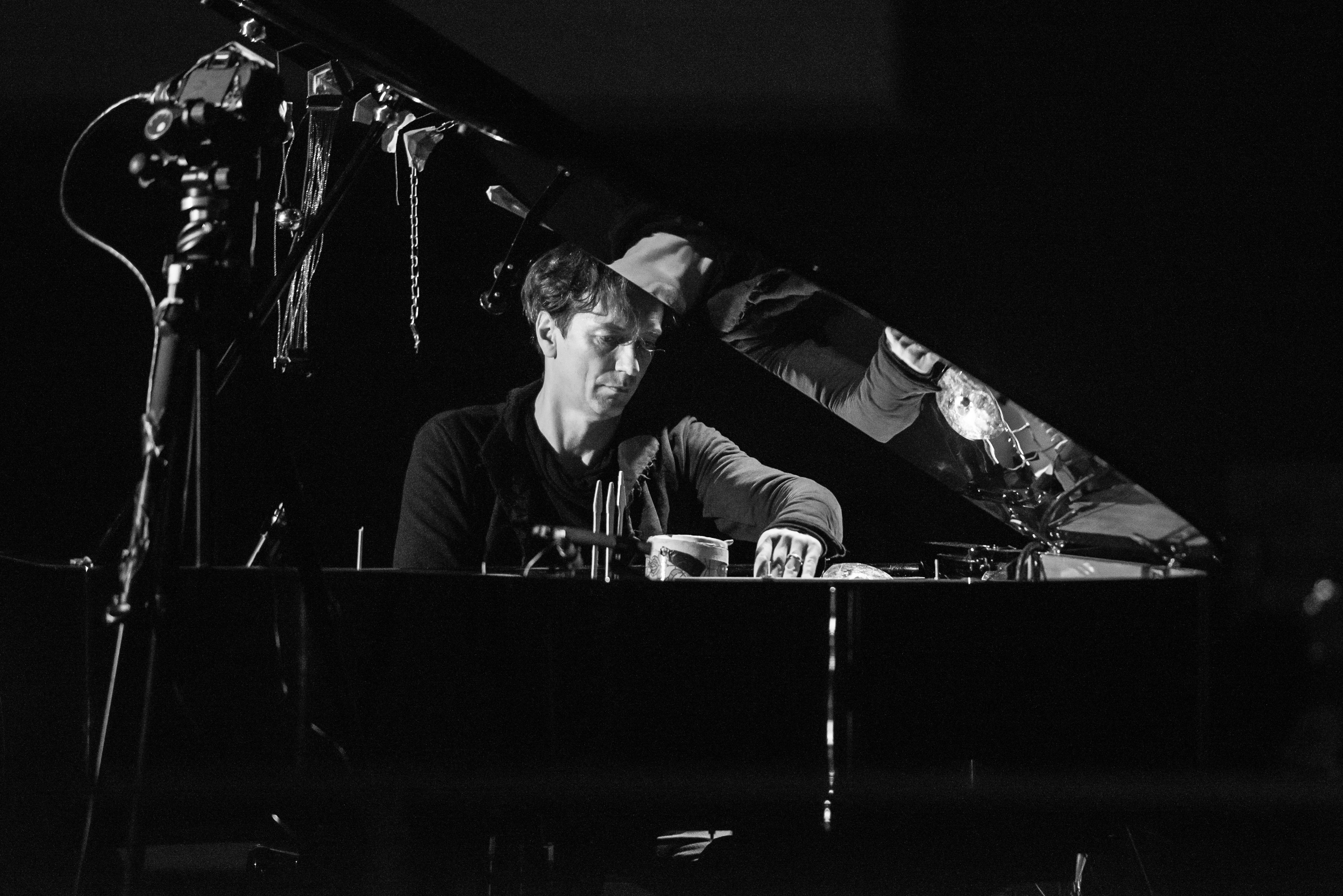
Hauschka during Denovali Swingfest 2015

On his 2011 album Salon des Amateurs Bertelmann collaborated with notable musicians such as Samuli Kosminen (Múm, Edea), Jeffrey Zeigler (ex Kronos Quartet), Pekka Kusisto, The band Múm, Nik Bartsch, Henrik Schwarz and Hilary Hahn, as well as Calexico's Joey Burns and John Convertino. These recordings were originally intended as a joint release with Foreign Landscapes, whereby on the one hand the piano was going to be just one instrument among many, and on the other it was to be used primarily as a rhythm instrument. The recorded pieces did not fit together in the way Bertelmann had envisaged, however, so he decided to release the two albums separately. Foreign Landscapes represents a shift of focus away from the prepared piano as a solo instrument, while Salon des Amateurs signals a move towards a more strongly rhythmic approach.

The release of Salon des Amateurs was followed by the release of remix album Salon des Amateurs Remixes, which featured notable contributions by Michael Mayer, Matthew Herbert, Max Loderbauer & Ricardo Villalobos, Alva Noto and Steve Bicknell.

In May 2012 Silfra, a collaborative album with the American violinist Hilary Hahn, was released on Deutsche Grammophon. Named after the Silfra rift in Iceland, it consists of twelve improvisations by Bertelmann and Hahn that were recorded by Valgeir Sigurdsson at Greenhouse Studios in Reykjavík.

In 2012 Bertelmann wrote his first score for a feature film, entitled Glück, which was directed by Doris Dörrie.

=== 2015–present: Lion, What If and commissioned works ===
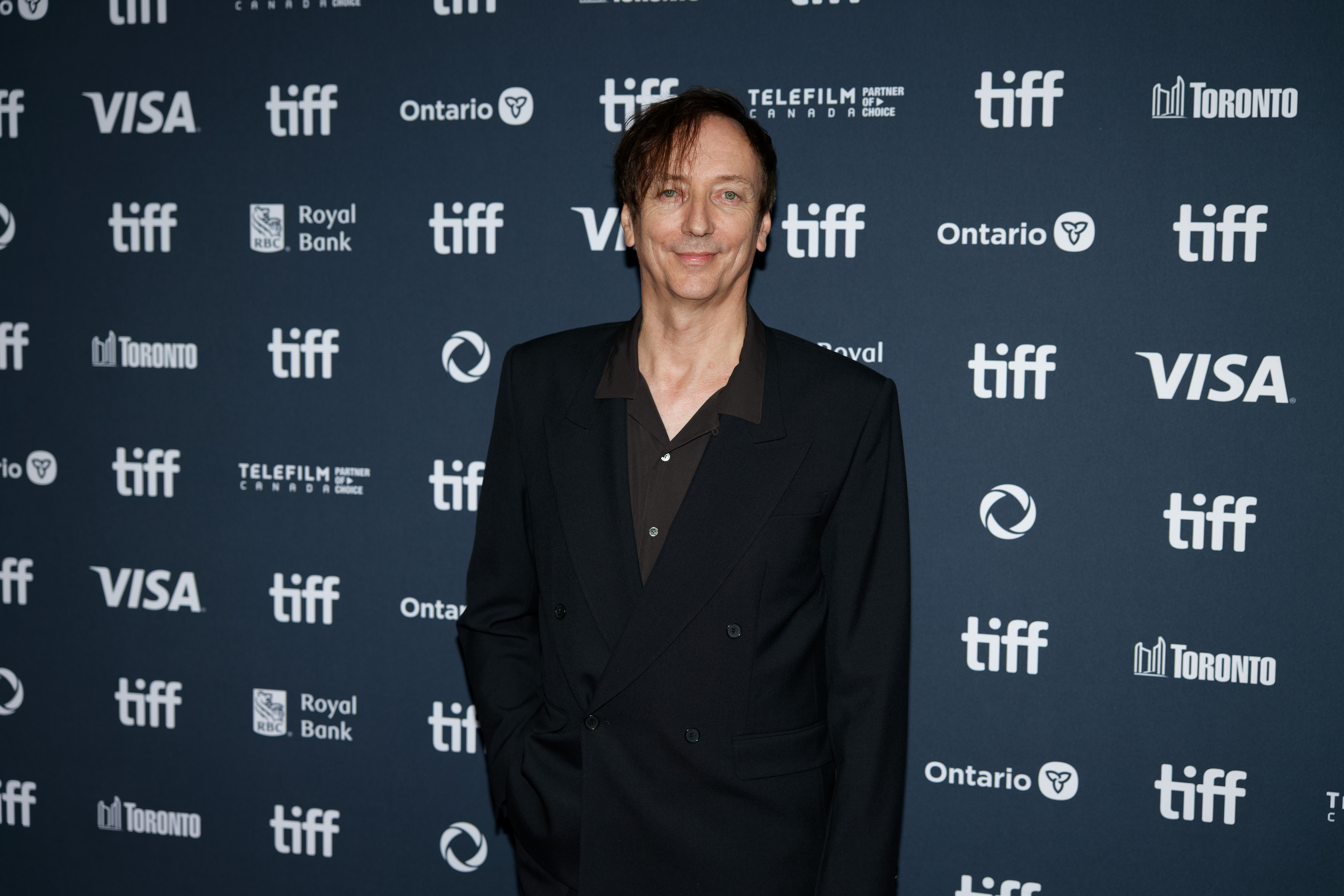
Bertelmann in 2024

In 2015, Bertelmann was an artist-in-residence at the MDR Leipzig Radio Symphony Orchestra. He created three pieces for them, most notably his collaboration with Múm entitled "Drowning", which they premiered at the Gewandhaus in Leipzig on 27 June 2015. In 2016, he was commissioned to create a piece for acclaimed cellist Nicholas Altstädt. The piece, "Lost", premiered at Viva Cello in September 2016.

In 2016, Bertelmann collaborated with Dustin O'Halloran on the score for the Oscar-nominated film Lion. The score of the film was nominated for all major awards including the Academy Awards, Golden Globes, BAFTAs and Critics' Choice Awards.

In 2017, he released solo album What If on City Slang and Temporary Residence. The album explores the possibilities of his music, inspired by hip-hop, performed by fast and accurate player pianos. Bertelmann wrote two pieces for Avi Avital, called Flood and Drought, which premiered at the Schleswig-Holstein Musik Festival in July 2017.

In 2018, he composed the score for the film Adrift, which is based on the true story of a sailor stranded at sea after a storm. Adrift is directed by Baltasar Kormákur and stars Shailene Woodley and Sam Claflin. Bertelmann stated, "Collaborating with Baltasar Kormákur was a wonderful experience and he gave me a lot of freedom to find the right sound for the film. Adrift tells a story about love and the fragility of human existence, so I wanted to create some sort of instrumental tension to reflect both the darkness and peril, as well as the lightness and love in this film. We ended up recording a full string orchestra at British Grove in London and added piano and experimental electronics to create a diverse and dynamic score. I'm very happy with the result, and I feel fortunate to have been part of this powerful film."

In 2019, he created the Hauschka Composer Toolkit sample library with Spitfire Audio, featuring many of his signature sounds.

In 2020 he composed the score for the popular Netflix film The Old Guard starring Charlize Theron, as well as Summerland with Gemma Arterton, Francis Lee's romantic drama Ammonite, and the sci-fi movie Stowaway starring Anna Kendrick and Toni Collette.

In 2022, he scored All Quiet on the Western Front for Netflix, the official Best International Feature Film Oscar-entry for Germany, and War Sailor, both of which were official selections at the Toronto International Film Festival. For his work on the former, he won the Academy Award for Best Original Score and the BAFTA Award for Best Original Music.

He has presented Tiny Desk Concerts twice, in 2010 and 2024.

== Discography ==
=== Albums ===
- Substantial (2004)
- The prepared piano (2005)
- What a day (EP 2006)
- Room to Expand (2007)
- Versions of the Prepared Piano (2007)
- Ferndorf (2008)
- Snowflakes and Carwrecks (2008)
- Small Pieces (2009)
- Foreign Landscapes (2010)
- Salon Des Amateurs (2011)
- Salon Des Amateurs Remixes (2012)
- Youyoume (EP 2011)
- Pan Tone (EP 2011) with Hildur Guðnadóttir
- Silfra (2012) with Hilary Hahn
- Abandoned City (2014)
- 5 Movements (EP 2016) with Dustin O'Halloran
- A NDO C Y (2015)
- What If (2017)
- A Different Forest (2019)
- Upstream (2021)
- Philanthropy (2023)

=== Soundtrack albums ===
- The Boy (2015, Milan Records)
- Lion (2016, Sony Music)
- In Dubious Battle (2017, Lakeshore Records)
- Gunpowder (2017, Sony Music)
- 1000 Arten Regen Zu Beschreiben (2018, Needlewood Records)
- Adrift (2018, Sony Classical)
- Hotel Mumbai (2019, Varèse Sarabande)
- The Art of Racing in the Rain (2019, Fox Music)
- Dublin Murders (2020, Needlewood Records)
- Summerland (2020, Needlewood Records)
- The Old Guard (2020, Milan Records)
- Schnee von gestern (2020, Needlewood Records)
- Als Hitler das rosa Kaninchen stahl (2020, Needlewood Records)
- Downhill (2020, Fox Music)
- A Christmas Carol (2020, Hollywood Records)
- Ammonite (2020, Milan Records)
- Stowaway (2021, Lakeshore Records)
- Barbarians (Season 2) (2022, Netflix Music, LLC)
- War Sailor (2022, Lakeshore Records)
- Living with the Unknown (2022, Edition Needlewood/Bosworth Music GmbH, Emergence Magazine)
- All Quiet on the Western Front (2022, Netflix Music, LLC)
- Conclave (2024, Back Lot Music)
- Dune: Prophecy (2024, Milan Records)
- A House of Dynamite (2025, Netflix Music, LLC)
- The Uprising (2026, Back Lot Music)
- Verity (2026, Lakeshore Records)

== Filmography ==
=== Film ===
Year	Title	Director	Notes
2007	Wortbrot	Estelle Klawitter	
2008	Bloksky	Jeff Desom	Also actor, "Hektor Bloksky"
2008	Act of Violence	Lars Henning Jung	
2009	In Between a Kiss	Reza Rameri	
2009	Morgenrot	Jeff Desom	Credited as Music by Hauschka
2010	QC Notorious	Robert Agro-Melina	
2011	Sehnsucht	Faiza Zaidi	
2012	Bliss	Doris Dörrie	Music producer
2013	Wild Horses	Stephanie Martin	
2014	Futuro Beach	Karim Aïnouz	Credited as Hauschka
2014	Farewell Herr Schwarz	Yael Reuveny	
2016	The Boy	Craig William Macneill	Credited as Hauschka
2016	In Dubious Battle	James Franco	
2016	Lion	Garth Davis	Composed with Dustin O'Halloran, credited as Hauschka
2017	The Current War	Alfonso Gomez-Rejon	Composed with Dustin O'Halloran; Provided original score for the theatrical release, replaced with a new score by Saunder Jurriaans and Danny Bensi
2017	1000 Arten, den Regen zu beschreiben	Isabel Prahl	
2018	Adrift	Baltasar Kormákur	
2018	Hotel Mumbai	Anthony Maras	
2018	Ashes in the Snow	Marius A. Markevicius	
2019	The Art of Racing in the Rain	Simon Curtis	Composed with Dustin O'Halloran; Musician, piano
2019	The Perfect Candidate	Haifaa al-Mansour	
2019	The Space Between the Lines	Vanessa Jopp	
2020	Downhill	Nat Faxon and Jim Rash	
2020	The Old Guard	Gina Prince-Bythewood	Composed with Dustin O'Halloran
2020	Summerland	Jessica Swale	
2020	Ammonite	Francis Lee	Composed with Dustin O'Halloran
2021	Stowaway	Joe Penna	
2022	Against the Ice	Peter Flinth	
2022	Memory of Water	Saara Saarela	Credited as Hauschka
2022	All Quiet on the Western Front	Edward Berger	
2022	War Sailor	Gunnar Vikene	
2023	Jules	Marc Turtletaub	
2023	The Dive	Max Erlenwein	Composed with Raffael Seyfried
2023	One Life	James Hawes	
2024	A Sacrifice	Jordan Scott	
2024	The Crow	Rupert Sanders	
2024	Conclave	Edward Berger	
2025	Delicious	Nele Mueller-Stöfen	Composed with Ben Winkler, it was screened in Panorama at the 75th Berlin International Film Festival in February 2025.
2025	The Amateur	James Hawes	
2025	Dead of Winter	Brian Kirk	
2025	Ballad of a Small Player	Edward Berger	
2025	A House of Dynamite	Kathryn Bigelow	
2025	Grand Prix of Europe	Waldemar Fast	
2026	Pressure	Anthony Maras	
2026	De Gaulle	Antonin Baudry	Two-part film
2026	The Uprising	Paul Greengrass	
2026	Verity	Michael Showalter	
2026	Clayface	James Watkins	
2026	Bunker	Florian Zeller	
2027	Panic Carefully	Sam Esmail	
TBA	The Last Disturbance of Madeline Hynde	Kenneth Branagh	Replaced Patrick Doyle

=== Television ===
Year	Title	Network	Notes
2017	Gunpowder	BBC One	TV miniseries
2018	Patrick Melrose	Showtime (US); Sky Atlantic (UK)	TV miniseries Credited as Hauschka
2019	The Name of the Rose	Rai 1	TV miniseries
2019	Dublin Murders	BBC One	
2019	A Christmas Carol	BBC One; FX	TV miniseries Composed with Dustin O'Halloran
2020	Your Honor	Showtime	TV miniseries
2022	Barbarians	Netflix	TV Series; Composed for season 2
2022	Life after Life	BBC Two	TV miniseries
2023	Black Mirror	Netflix	TV Series; Composed for season 6, episode 3: Beyond the Sea
2024	Social Studies	FX	Documentary series
2024	Dune: Prophecy	Max	
2024	The Day of the Jackal	Sky Atlantic	
2026	The Trap	Netflix	TV miniseries Composed with Ben Winkler

=== Documentaries ===
Year	Title	Director	Notes
2009	Tales of the Defeated	Yael Reuveny	
2016	Deutschland. Ein Sommermärchen	Sönke Wortmann	Musician, prepared piano
2016	Exodus	Hank Levine	
2017	AlphaGo	Greg Kohs	
2019	Cunningham	Alla Kovgan	
2019	Dialogue Earth	Hank Levine	
2023	Hollywoodgate	Ibrahim Nash’at	

== Awards and nominations ==
Award	Year	Category	Nominated work	Result
Academy Awards	2017	Best Original Score	Lion	Nominated
Academy Awards	2023	Best Original Score	All Quiet on the Western Front	Won
Academy Awards	2025	Best Original Score	Conclave	Nominated
BAFTA Film Awards	2017	Best Film Music	Lion	Nominated
BAFTA Film Awards	2023	Best Film Music	All Quiet on the Western Front	Won
BAFTA Film Awards	2025	Best Film Music	Conclave	Nominated
BAFTA Television Craft Awards	2019	Best Original Music	Patrick Melrose	Nominated
Golden Globe	2017	Best Original Score	Lion	Nominated
Golden Globe	2025	Best Original Score	Conclave	Nominated
AACTA Awards	2017	Best Original Score	Lion	Won
AACTA Awards	2019	Best Original Score	Hotel Mumbai	Nominated
Critics' Choice Movie Awards	2016	Best Score	Lion	Nominated
Critics' Choice Movie Awards	2025	Best Score	Conclave	Nominated
Satellite Awards	2025	Best Original Score	Conclave	Nominated
Society of Composers & Lyricists	2025	Outstanding Original Score for a Studio Film	Conclave	Nominated
German Film Awards	2023	Best Film Music	All Quiet on the Western Front	Won
Havana Film Festival	2014	Best Music	Praia do Futuro	Nominated

== See also ==
- List of German Academy Award winners and nominees
