= The Bells (Nils Frahm album) =

Live album by Nils Frahm
- Released: February 1, 2010
- Recorded: All compositions recorded n the Grunewald Church, Berlin on November 13 and 14, 2008
- Genres: Contemporary classical, Avant-Garde
- Length: 40:14
- Label: Erased Tapes ERATP021CD
- Producer: Peter Broderick

Nils Frahm chronology
| Wintermusik (2009) | The Bells (2010) | Unter/Über (2010) |

The Bells is an album by German pianist and composer Nils Frahm, first released in 2009 under the Swedish Kning Disk label, then more broadly in 2010 by Erased Tapes Records. It was recorded over two days in the Grunewald Church in Berlin.

== Reception ==
Professional ratings
Aggregate scores
| Source | Rating |
|---|---|
| Metacritic | 75/100 |
Review scores
| Source | Rating |
| Mojo | 4/5 stars |
| Drowned in Sound | 8/10 |
| Rock Sound | 8/10 |
| Uncut | 3/5 stars |
| musicOMH | 3/5 stars |
| Pitchfork | 4.8/10 |

The Bells received mainly positive reviews on release. At Metacritic, which assigns a normalised rating out of 100 to reviews from mainstream critics, the album has received a score of 75, based on 6 reviews which is categorised as generally favorable. Writing for BBC Music, Spencer Grady observed "The resultant pieces feel so alive that you can almost sense the pressure of Frahm’s fingers alighting on each key as these solemn improvisations begin to weave their magic. Their unrefined organic energy and resonance is undoubtedly due to the natural reverb of the old church in Berlin where this set was recorded". Rock Sound reviewer Joe Marshall enthused "The Bells is a consistently fascinating listen. Possessing a grandeur that never descends into pomposity and a restraint that could never be mistaken for bland aural wallpaper, this is undoubtedly one of the most beautiful releases you’re likely to hear over the coming months'. Not all critics were as generous. In his 3 star review on MusicOMH, Ben Hogwood said "The Bells is a mixed bag of accomplished piano pieces that could do with a bit more subtlety in those passages where the intensity rises. It’s those softer, more intimate asides that have the greatest impact, allowing the listener to truly connect with Nils Frahm and his message. And that’s where the simple beauty of the piano shines through". In his review for Pitchfork, Brian Howe gave the album 4.8 out of 10 saying "The bottom line is that The Bells tends to be either tedious and pretty or interesting and caustic; it often feels unpleasantly satisfied with itself.".

== Track listing ==
All tracks are written by Nils Frahm.

The Bells track listing
| No. | Title | Length |
|---|---|---|
| 1. | "In the Sky and On the Ground" | 0:55 |
| 2. | "I Would Like to Think" | 6:00 |
| 3. | "Said and Done" | 3:14 |
| 4. | "Dedication, Loyalty" | 3:09 |
| 5. | "Down Down" | 3:37 |
| 6. | "Over There, It's Raining" | 1:51 |
| 7. | "Small Me" | 5:38 |
| 8. | "My Things" | 5:14 |
| 9. | "Peter Is Dead in the Piano" | 3:06 |
| 10. | "It Was Really, Really Grey" | 4:59 |
| 11. | "Somewhere Nearby" | 2:31 |
| Total length: | | 40:14 |

== Personnel ==
Credits adapted from liner notes.

- Nils Frahm – piano
- Peter Broderick – production
- Rune Johansson – mastering
- Klaus Frahm – photography
- Mattias Nilsson – design
- Robert Raths – layout
