= All Quiet on the Western Front (soundtrack) =

All Quiet on the Western Front (Soundtrack from the Netflix Film)

Film score by Volker Bertelmann
- Released: October 28, 2022
- Genre: Film score
- Length: 53:06
- Label: Netflix Music
- Producer: Volker Bertelmann

Volker Bertelmann chronology
Against the Ice (2022)	All Quiet on the Western Front (2022)	War Sailor (2022)

All Quiet on the Western Front (Soundtrack from the Netflix Film) is the score album composed by German composer Volker Bertelmann to the 2022 film All Quiet on the Western Front, directed by Edward Berger, based on the 1929 novel of the same name by Erich Maria Remarque as well as the third feature film to be adapted from the novel after the 1930 silent film and 1979 television film. The album, featuring 24-tracks, was released by Netflix Music on October 28, 2022, the same day as the film.

The score has a non-traditional structure and minimalism, created using three huge distorted notes played on a century-old harmonium with the chords hanging in the air at unexpected times. It also features a snare drum patter occurring intermittently, which is intended to attack the viewer, and pastoral music to frame the European countryside. The score was critically acclaimed, with Bertelmann winning the Academy Award for Best Original Score and BAFTA Award for Best Original Score.

== Development ==
The film is scored by Volker Bertelmann, who had previously scored three films for Berger, as well as five episodes of Patrick Melrose (2018) and three of Your Honor (2020–2023); Berger served as director for the former, and as director and executive producer for the latter. Berger wanted the music "that would attack the images on screen", while Bertelmann did not want to go back to the novel and the 1930 film as "he wanted to take the film as a new piece of art". He recalled that Berger was more verbose during the discussions that led to the score's assaultive drumbeats, as Berger did not want a normal score for the film, and further added: "So when we were talking about military sounds, of course we talked about snare drums. But we wanted to find something that is not like this rolling snare in a marching band. We wanted the sound of a bullet shot or something disturbing. It's interesting to say, 'All we're giving you is this snare drum. We're taking everything else away.' That is unsettling, and once you get used to it, it is almost a character in the film."

"It's maybe used like in an art installation or an art piece or a dance piece. I wrote a couple of theater pieces, and there you have more of an artistic approach of using music not only in a purely composed way. In a lot of compositions, there's always a structure continuing onward. There can be other elements, but there's always a time-frame underneath. And once you hear the time-frame, the surprise is gone."

— Volker Bertelmann, on the non-traditional structure of the film's score.

The first piece he wrote for the film was a three-note motif, based on his impressions for the first 10 minutes of the film and scored within 24 hours after seeing the film. He said: "There's no dialogue in that section, and it's so well edited that you totally understand the mechanism of the war machine, and how humans are used as material. And I wanted to have something in that fits with that, and also fits with the sound of the sewing machines." He planned a four-note motif at some point, but cut off one note as he concluded that the three-note motif was suited well for the film. He implemented the motif in multiple cues, repeating it in a way that is not always as strong or dark in the beginning. For the lighter sequences, he wrote a cello theme that used the base element, which created the warmth and beauty with the same motif, so as to infiltrate all the other pieces. The high violin parts were also cued from the same motif but are much longer notes.

Bertelmann used a pump organ-type old harmonium owned by his great-grandmother for the score, which he ran through a stack of distorted Marshall amplifiers. He boosted the bass for the opening motif, so that it nearly sounded like a modular synthesizer. At the same time, a cue called "Paul" was played completely through a harmonium, into which Bertelmann had inserted microphones to amplify the mechanical sounds very closely. He felt that "you would take a day just to take all the noises out because you don't want to have them. You want to have the pure sound. But in this case, I wanted to have all the cracklings that make you think that you are in an old ship. It has a wooden sound of mechanical noise". While sending an audio clip to Berger, the director praised it as equivalent to Led Zeppelin's music. The film also featured choral music in a few sequences, especially those of the battlefield, which was a contrast to the harmonium music along with that of the high violin pieces. He further doubled it with a string ensemble, which was the shimmer behind the solo violin.

== Track listing ==
No.	Title	Length
1.	"Remains"	2:58
2.	"Uniform"	1:49
3.	"Rain & Night"	1:21
4.	"Flares"	1:35
5.	"Buried & Found"	2:52
6.	"Dog Tags"	1:28
7.	"Ludwig"	1:58
8.	"Comrades"	3:55
9.	"Search Party"	2:17
10.	"72 Hours"	1:19
11.	"Tanks"	1:46
12.	"War Machines"	2:03
13.	"Retreat"	1:46
14.	"Bomb Crater"	3:40
15.	"Night Fires"	1:31
16.	"Scarf"	0:54
17.	"Tjaden"	1:29
18.	"Fear of What is Coming"	1:16
19.	"Kat"	1:11
20.	"No End"	4:23
21.	"Last Combat"	4:47
22.	"Making Sense of War"	2:26
23.	"All Quiet on the Western Front"	2:39
24.	"Paul"	1:43
Total length:		53:06

== Release history ==
The score was digitally released on October 28, 2022, the same day as the film's release on Netflix.

On March 1, 2023, the vinyl edition of the film's score was announced and set for pre-order. The album featured a 180-gram smoke colored vinyl disc pressed in two sides of the LP record and packaged in a heavyweight sleeve with leather laminate finish, and had attached 4-page booklet regarding the film's music. The album is set for a May 5, 2023 release.

Release dates and formats for All Quiet on the Western Front (Soundtrack from the Netflix Film)
Region	Date	Format(s)	Label	Ref.
Various	October 28, 2022	CD; digital download; streaming	Interscope	
Various	May 5, 2023	Vinyl	Interscope	

== Reception ==
Professional ratings
Review scores
Source	Rating
AllMusic	link

Gissane Sophia of Marvelous Geeks Media wrote: "The original score is dark, unnervingly heartbreaking at times, and yet, simultaneously effortless to listen to it. We mention this with original scores at times, but sometimes darker themes don't make it easy to put on for a long while, but that's not the case here because something about the moving pieces makes it impossible to turn off."

Contrastingly, in a negative review, music critic Jonathan Broxton wrote: "99% of all film scores work in their film, and the one thing a film composer should never do, under any circumstances, is make their film worse. With All Quiet on the Western Front, Volker Bertelmann comes perilously close to being a part of that 1% and breaking that cardinal rule. The final execution of these ideas and concepts was remarkably poor, and that when heard in film context the music never achieves any sort of connection with its audience – instead, at times, it intentionally breaks that connection, and ruins scenes that would otherwise have been much more emotionally powerful and dramatically potent."

== Accolades ==
Award	Date of ceremony	Category	Recipient	Result	Ref.
Academy Awards	March 12, 2023	Best Original Score	Volker Bertelmann	Won	
British Academy Film Awards	February 19, 2023	Best Original Score	Volker Bertelmann	Won	
German Film Awards	May 12, 2023	Best Score	Volker Bertelmann	Won	
Indiana Film Journalists Association	December 19, 2022	Best Musical Score	Volker Bertelmann	Nominated	
