= Spitfire Audio =

English music technology company

Coordinates: 51.54299°N 0.12281°W

- Type: Private
- Industry: Music Software
- Founded: 2007; 19 years ago
- Founder: Christian Henson and Paul Thomson
- Headquarters: London, United Kingdom
- Area served: Worldwide
- Products: digital audio sample libraries
- Website: Official website

Spitfire Audio is an English technology company based in London that creates virtual instrument sample libraries used for music production. The company was founded in 2007 by professional composers Christian Henson and Paul Thomson.

== Products ==
Henson and Thomson initially made their sample libraries available only to colleagues, but upon finding there was a larger market for the sample libraries founded Spitfire Audio in 2007.

Taking the form of digital audio plug-ins featuring recordings made by professional artists in recognised recording studios, Spitfire Audio's virtual instruments make available recordings of each note performed in multiple ways using multiple microphone positions. Composers and musicians play the virtual instrument within a digital audio workstation via MIDI to create new music.

Some Spitire Audio products utilize Spitfire's own interface with select performance specifics, while others utilize the Native Instruments Kontakt system. The purchase price of Spitfire Audio products includes the right to use the music produced commercially without further payment, with the original performers receiving both an initial fee and subsequent royalties from Spitfire Audio.

The recording sessions for the company's sample libraries are made in commercial studios such as AIR Lyndhurst in Hampstead, Abbey Road Studios in St John's Wood, and Headley Grange. Similarly, Spitfire Audio's recordings of the BBC Symphony Orchestra were made at the orchestra's base in the BBC's Maida Vale Studios. The company also operates their own recording studio at their premises in Tileyard London.

In addition to direct recordings of individual and groups of instruments, Spitfire has collaborated with noted film composer Hans Zimmer, Red Hot Chili Peppers drummer Chad Smith, Ólafur Arnalds, Roger Taylor of Queen, Eric Whitacre, guitarist Leo Abrahams, and posthumously with the explorer and musician David Fanshawe, in creating mixed audio productions for television and film use.

Alongside the company's retail products, it also releases occasional free products under the 'LABS' brand.

== Pianobook ==
On Piano day in 2018, Henson launched a website and YouTube channel called Pianobook. Run by a small group of volunteers, the channel is dedicated to creating and sharing sampled instruments for free. As of April 2021, over 500 'instruments' had been released via the Pianobook YouTube channel. Pianobook's instruments are made available in Decent Sampler, Kontakt, SFZ, and EXS/Logic Pro Sampler formats.

== SA Recordings ==
The company runs their own record label, SARecordings, to offer recordings using Spitfire Audio products by selected composers, such as Alev Lenz's third studio album 3, which was the label's first release. Additionally, Spitfire Audio has announced plans for a series of unique sample libraries to be released in conjunction with their artists’ album releases.

== Acquisition ==
In April 2025 Spitfire Audio was acquired by Splice.

== See also ==
- Blake Robinson Synthetic Orchestra
- The Mrs Mills Piano
- Timelapse of the Future
- Jeremiah Fraites
