= Frank Schültge =

German author, musician, and producer

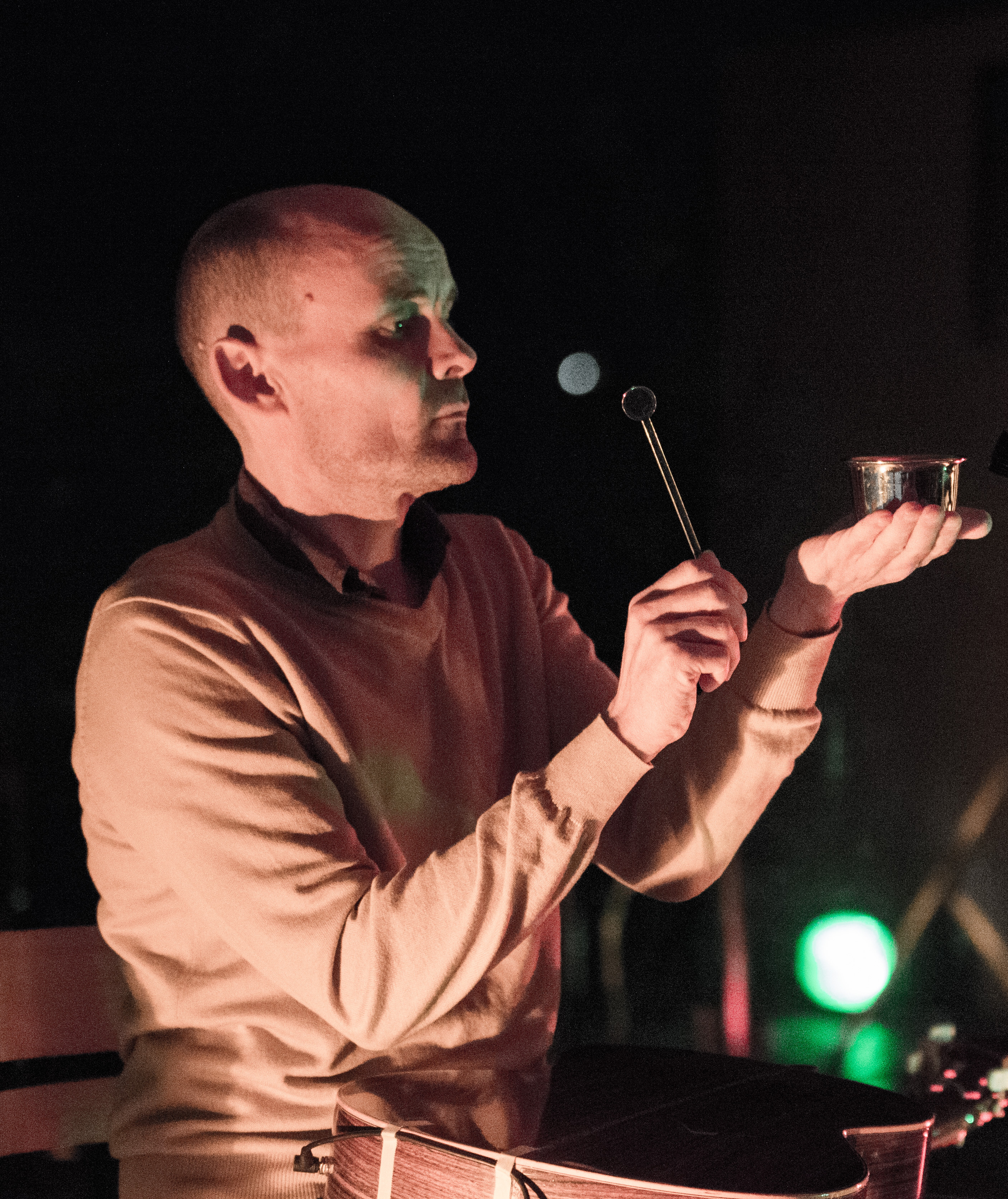
- Schültge in 2014

Background information
- Also known as: F. S. Blumm
- Born: Bremen, Germany
- Occupations: Author, musician, producer
- Years active: 1997–present

Frank Schültge is a German author, musician, and producer working under the pseudonym F. S. Blumm.

== Biography ==
Schültge received classical guitar lessons in his youth, but developed a growing interest in noise music. He played in various groups that were influenced by the sound of Sonic Youth, Melvins, and later Gastr Del Sol.

In 1990, Schültge began a teacher training programme in music and art, and passed the staatsexamen in 1996. In 1997 he moved to Berlin in order to concentrate on working as a freelance musician and composer.

Schültge has collaborated with a number of other musicians, including the Cologne multi-instrumentalist Harald "Sack" Ziegler as the duo Sack & Blumm, and with Marcel Türkowsky as Kinn. In addition, he worked with Christian Berner, writing and producing radio plays for public broadcast by SWR, WDR, and Deutschlandradio; their Formal Radio work, won a Prix Europa award in 2000.

In 2007, he began work with Ella Blixt as the duo Bobby & Blumm, producing the minimalist folk-influenced albums Everybody Loves ... in 2008, and A Little Big in 2010. He also worked with Jana Plewa in 2008 as the group The Kat Cosm, along with guest musicians Sven Kacirek and Harald Ziegler, releasing the album Swaying Boldly Afar.

== Discography ==
=== Solo ===
- 2000: Bettvanille Weiter - EP (Tomlab)
- 2000: Six Mbiras - Split-CD (Tomlab)
- 2001: Mondkuchen - CD (Morr Music)
- 2002: Ankern CD (Staubgold)
- 2004: ...And Friends - Sesamsamen - CD (Plop)
- 2005: Zweite Meer - CD (Morr Music)
- 2006: Summer Kling - CD (Morr Music)
- 2010: Up Up Treasures - Split-CD (Poprebop)
- 2013: Food
- 2013: Up Up And Astray – CD (Pingipung)
- 2017: Welcome - LP (Karaoke Kalk)
- 2022: Kiss Dance Kiss
- 2024: Torre – LP (Leiter)

=== Collaborations ===
- 1994: Die Auch: Im Ernst - LP (n.Ur-Kult)
- 1998: Sack & Blumm: Die fünfte Dengelophonie - EP (Dhyana)
- 1999: Sack & Blumm: Sylvester Orchester 2000 - EP (Staubgold)
- 1999: Sack & Blumm: Sack & Blumm - CD (Tomlab)
- 1999: Ström: Hönigtier/Fensterkreuz - EP (Dhyana)
- 2000: Ström: Wellenbrecher - CD (Klangkrieg)
- 2000: Sack & Blumm: Shy Noon - CD (Gefriem)
- 2000: Sack & Blumm: 2x5 - EP (Staubgold)
- 2000: Rebresch & Blumm: Hörcomics - CD (Plattenmeister)
- 2001: Sack & Blumm: Zack Bumm - (Tokuma)
- 2002: Blumm & Möbius: 20 Locked Grooves - CD (Happy Zloty Records)
- 2003: Sack & Blumm: Kind Kind - CD (Staubgold)
- 2003: Kinn: Kinn - CD (Audio Dregs)
- 2005: Kinn: Karlshorst - CD (Audio Dregs)
- 2007: Anne Laplantine & F.S.Blumm: FA - EP (Alien Transistor)
- 2007: F.S.Blumm & Luca Fadda: F.S.Blumm meets Luca Fadda - CD (Ahornfelder)
- 2008: Old Splendifolia: Swaying Boldly Afar - CD (Plop)
- 2008: Bobby & Blumm: Everybody Loves ... - CD (Morr Music)
- 2009: Sack & Blumm: Returns - CD (Staubgold)
- 2009: David Grubbs & F.S.Blumm: Back to the Plants - CD (Ahornfelder)
- 2010: Bobby & Blumm: A Little Big - CD (Sound of a Handshake)
- 2010: F.S.Blumm & Nils Frahm: Music for Lovers Music Versus Time - CD (Sonic Pieces)
- 2010: F.S.Blumm + Bradien: Up Up Treasures|Trim - (Poprebop Records)
- 2011: F.S.Blumm / Lucrecia Dalt*: Cuatro Covers - EP (La Bèl Netlabel)
- 2013: F.S.Blumm & Nils Frahm: Music For Wobbling Music Versus Gravity - CD (Sonic Pieces)
- 2015: F.S. Blumm & Springintgut: The Bird and White Noise – LP (Pingipung, nightcruising)
- 2016: F.S.Blumm & Nils Frahm: Tag Eins Tag Zwei - CD (Sonic Pieces)
- 2020: F.S.Blumm & Andi Otto: Entangleland – LP (Pingipung)
- 2021: F.S.Blumm & Nils Frahm: 2X1=4 - LEITER Verlag GmbH & Co. KG
- 2025: F.S.Blumm & Nils Frahm: Handling - LEITER Verlag GmbH & Co. KG

=== Radio plays ===
- 2008: Wurfsendung 108: Im Wartesaal der Gerechtigkeit. Director: Frank Schültge/Jan Theiler, Performed by: Tonio Arango, Katharina Burowa, Christian Gaul, Steffen Scheumann. EIG.
