= Mary Queen of Scots (soundtrack) =

Mary Queen of Scots (Original Motion Picture Soundtrack)

Soundtrack album by Max Richter
- Released: 7 December 2018
- Recorded: 2018
- Studio: AIR Studios, London
- Genre: Film score
- Length: 58:38
- Label: Deutsche Grammophon
- Producer: Max Richter

Max Richter chronology
Never Look Away (2018)	Mary Queen of Scots (2018)	My Brilliant Friend (2018)

Mary Queen of Scots (Original Motion Picture Soundtrack) is the soundtrack to the 2018 film Mary Queen of Scots, directed by Josie Rourke starring Saoirse Ronan as Mary, Queen of Scots, and Margot Robbie as her cousin Queen Elizabeth I. Featuring original score by Max Richter, consisting of period and contemporary modern music, the album was recorded at the Air Studios in London, with an 100-piece orchestra and 12-member female choir performing the score. Deutsche Grammophon released the film's score on 7 December 2018.

== Background and development ==
"I'm very involved with Renaissance music. Some of my favorite listening music comes from that time, so that was quite exciting, to think about trying to develop a musical language, which could be dramatic and contemporary, but at the same time had a shared DNA with the music of that period. That technical challenge was exciting. There was something quite inviting about that."

— Max Richter

Mary Queen of Scots, being a period film set in the 16th century, Richter provided a fairly modern score that chimed in with his own musical interests, after his involvement with renaissance music. Early-music expert William Lyons called in to handle the historical material, which led Richter free to handle the dramatic score. He claimed that the director Josie Rourke gave him free reins to imagine a musical universe for the story, which consisting historical and modern music as well, and beyond that she was open to bring his vision into the story.

Richter wanted the film to have women's voice as the center of the film's score to provide a psychological context, as the film was a "female-driven piece of storytelling. It's kind of a love story; it's multiple love stories, really. It's the two of them navigating their relationship, and they also have love relationships with other people, and it's about how that plays out against the historical backdrop." The world of men, according to Richter, generally associated with brutality of various kinds, and preceded with heavy drones, and orchestral music, with low-register instruments, bass instruments pulsating the score, and war drums used to propel the combatants in these various battles and skirmishes, but also propelling Mary to her execution.

The French instrument cor anglais is used for Mary's voice to play huge themes. Richter also wanted the use of instrument as an easter egg, as Mary was born in France and came to Britain, which her liked to have the instrument of a French name that play her melody and served perfect for the story. He further used a classical harp and Gaelic harp to provide the domestic storytelling color. The score consisted of numerous choral music, which consisted of wordless female drones and written-out choral music that uses the language of 16th century Elizabethian polyphonic choral music. A lot of the orchestral music built around repeating bass phrases, which was called a "ground bass" played as a loop, where most of the music built around that. He further experimented with a viol processing the sound into "electronic cloud of viols for some of the more coloristic sequences with the voices [...] The instrumental music is based on a kind of geometry and a set of gestures which come from Renaissance music. So it's a kind of wandering border between the contemporary and period authenticity."

A string infused 110-piece orchestra and 12-member female choir from London Voices being played throughout the score, but despite being set in Scotland and Richter's study in Edinburgh, he did not use bagpipes, instead employed Gaelic harps as to evoking those sort of colors without resorting to the touristy. The score was recorded in sections where he had to build the layers, sample them and remove those layers in the end. The choir was recorded separately in different sections, which were built up from the strings, and did separate sections for strings, brass, woodwinds and percussions and later assemble them into the score.

== Track listing ==
No.	Title	Length
1.	"The Shores of Scotland"	1:51
2.	"Elizabeth's Portrait"	3:40
3.	"A Claim to the Throne"	3:05
4.	"If Ye Love Me"	2:10
5.	"My Crown"	2:51
6.	"The Poem"	2:23
7.	"Darnley's Visit"	2:05
8.	"The Wedding"	2:44
9.	"Knox"	3:14
10.	"The Hilltop"	1:55
11.	"Rizzio's Plea"	1:48
12.	"The Ambush"	2:06
13.	"Pray for Me"	5:50
14.	"A New Generation"	2:48
15.	"Darnley's Dismissal"	3:43
16.	"Outmaneuvered"	5:27
17.	"The Assassination"	2:29
18.	"Finale"	8:23
Total length:		58:38

== Reception ==
Music critic Jonathan Broxton of Movie Music UK wrote "this is Max Richter's career high film music composition to date, which will surely appeal to anyone whose taste in scores includes richly rendered but staunchly minimalist orchestral writing, enlivened with a dash of period romance." Gissane Sophia of Marvelous Geeks Media wrote "The entirety of the soundtrack is something special without question, but the few above are utterly mesmerizing. On some rare occasions, you love an original score even more than you love the film, and that's certainly the case with this one. The soundtrack hits different, and it beautifully captures a plethora of emotions." Sean Wilson of Mfiles wrote "Richter provides highly effective accompaniment using a minimal yet well-crafted and expertly deployed set of musical tools". James Southall of Movie Wave wrote "There's half an hour of real brilliance here – Richter is such a good composer – just a pity the whole thing is not quite as good as the sum of its parts."

== Chart performance ==
Chart (2019)	Peak position
UK Soundtrack Albums (OCC)	25

== Accolades ==
Award	Date of ceremony	Category	Recipient(s)	Result	Ref.
Hollywood Music in Media Awards	14 November 2018	Best Original Score – Feature Film	Max Richter	Won	
International Film Music Critics Association	7 February 2019	Best Original Score for a Drama Film	Max Richter	Won	
International Film Music Critics Association	7 February 2019	Film Music Composition of the Year	Max Richter – ("Finale")	Nominated	

== Album credits ==
Credits adapted from liner notes:

- Music composer and producer – Max Richter
- Creative director – Yulia Mahr
- Music co-ordinator – Eva Gaertner
- Sound engineer – Rupert Coulson
- Additional sound engineer – Tom Bailey
- Mastering – Götz-Michael Rieth
- Pro-tools engineer – Adam Miller, Laurence Anslow
- Music assistance – Georgina Hay
- Copyist – Dave Foster
- Booklet editor, design – WLP Ltd.

Performers

- Harp – Hugh Webb (tracks: 2, 6, 8, 15, 16, 18)
- Clàrsach – Jean Kelly (tracks: 6, 16)
- Orchestra – Air Lyndhurst Orchestra (tracks: 4)
- Choir – London Voices (tracks: 3, 4, 7, 9, 12, 13,16)
- Cor anglais – Jane Marshall (tracks: 1, 7, 10, 18)

Management

- A&R administration (Deutsche Grammophon) – Anusch Alimirzaie
- Soundtrack co-ordinator (Universal Pictures) – Andy Kalyvas, Nikki Walsh
- Product co-ordinator (Deutsche Grammophon) – Eva Gaertner
- Executive producer (Deutsche Grammophon) – Christian Badzura
- Executive in charge of music (Universal Pictures) – Mike Knobloch
- Music business and legal affairs (Universal Pictures) – Tanya Perara
- Product manager (Deutsche Grammophon) – Nanja Maung Yin
- Studio management – Rebecca Drake-Brockman
- Artist management – Steve Abbott
