= Piano Day =

Annual celebration

- Status: Active
- Genre: Festival
- Dates: 88th day of each year (29 March in common years, and 28 March in leap years)
- Begins: March 29, 2015
- Frequency: Annual
- Venue: Various
- Location: Worldwide
- Years active: 11
- Founded: March 29, 2015
- Founder: Nils Frahm
- Previous event: 2026-03-29
- Next event: 2027-03-29
- Website: pianoday.org

Piano Day is held on the 88th day of the year (29 March in normal years and 28 March in leap years) in celebration of and reference to the 88 keys on a standard piano. From an idea by the German pianist and composer Nils Frahm in 2015, "because it doesn't hurt to celebrate the piano and everything around it: performers, composers, piano builders, tuners, movers and most important, the listener", the event has grown in subsequent years with amateur and commercial success.

Each year, live concerts and online events have been held. In 2026, a World Piano Day concert was held at Carnegie Hall, with a performance by the 11-year-old Juliana Severin, and cities around Tampa Bay held a special concert series.

On Piano Day 2018, Christian Henson of Spitfire Audio launched a website and YouTube channel called Pianobook, dedicated to creating and sharing sampled instruments for free.
