= World Soundtrack Award for Soundtrack Composer of the Year =

Prize given by the World Soundtrack Academy

The World Soundtrack Award for Soundtrack Composer of the Year (a.k.a. "Film Composer of the Year") is one of the three main prizes given by the World Soundtrack Academy to honour the best movie soundtracks and the people who work on them.

== Winners and nominees ==
=== 2000s ===
==== 2001 ====
- John Williams – A.I. Artificial Intelligence
  - Carter Burwell – A Knight's Tale, Before Night Falls, and Book of Shadows: Blair Witch 2
  - Rachel Portman – Chocolat and The Legend of Bagger Vance
  - Yann Tiersen – Le Fabuleux destin d'Amélie Poulain
  - Hans Zimmer – An Everlasting Piece, Hannibal, Pearl Harbor, and The Pledge

==== 2002 ====
- Patrick Doyle – Gosford Park
  - James Horner – A Beautiful Mind
  - Randy Newman – Monsters, Inc.
  - Howard Shore – The Lord of the Rings: The Fellowship of the Ring
  - Hans Zimmer – Black Hawk Down

==== 2003 ====
- Elliot Goldenthal – Frida
  - Terence Blanchard – 25th Hour
  - Elmer Bernstein – Far from Heaven
  - Philip Glass – The Hours
  - Howard Shore – Gangs of New York

==== 2004 ====
- Gabriel Yared – Cold Mountain
  - Harry Gregson-Williams – Shrek 2
  - Christian Henson – Les Fils du vent
  - Alberto Iglesias – La Mala educación
  - Daniel Tarrab & Andrés Goldstein – La Puta y la Ballena
  - John Williams – Harry Potter and the Prisoner of Azkaban

==== 2005 ====
- Angelo Badalamenti – Un long dimanche de fiançailles
  - Thomas Newman – Lemony Snicket's A Series of Unfortunate Events
  - John Powell – The Bourne Supremacy
  - Howard Shore – The Aviator
  - John Williams – War of the Worlds

==== 2006 ====
- Alberto Iglesias – The Constant Gardener
  - Danny Elfman – Charlie and the Chocolate Factory
  - James Newton Howard – King Kong
  - Dario Marianelli – Pride & Prejudice
  - John Powell – Ice Age: The Meltdown

==== 2007 ====
- Alexandre Desplat – The Painted Veil and The Queen
  - Mychael Danna – Breach, Fracture, Little Miss Sunshine, and The Nativity Story
  - Philip Glass – Notes on a Scandal
  - Harry Gregson-Williams – Déjà Vu, Flushed Away, The Number 23, and Shrek the Third
  - John Powell – Happy Feet

==== 2008 ====
- James Newton Howard – Charlie Wilson's War, I Am Legend, and Michael Clayton
  - Alexandre Desplat – The Golden Compass
  - Alberto Iglesias – The Kite Runner
  - Dario Marianelli – Atonement
  - John Powell – The Bourne Ultimatum

==== 2009 ====
- Alexandre Desplat – The Curious Case of Benjamin Button, Cheri, Coco avant Chanel, and Largo Winch
  - Carter Burwell – Burn After Reading and Twilight
  - Danny Elfman – Milk, Notorious, and Taking Woodstock
  - Michael Giacchino – Land of the Lost, Star Trek, and Up
  - Hans Zimmer – Angels & Demons, The Dark Knight, and Frost/Nixon

=== 2010s ===
==== 2010 ====
- Alexandre Desplat – Fantastic Mr. Fox, The Ghost Writer, Julie & Julia, and The Twilight Saga: New Moon
  - Carter Burwell – The Blind Side, Howl, The Kids Are All Right, A Serious Man, and Where the Wild Things Are
  - Danny Elfman – Alice in Wonderland and The Wolfman
  - John Powell – Green Zone, How to Train Your Dragon, Ice Age: Dawn of the Dinosaurs, and Knight and Day
  - Hans Zimmer – It's Complicated and Sherlock Holmes

==== 2011 ====
- Alexandre Desplat – A Better Life, Harry Potter and the Deathly Hallows – Part 1, Harry Potter and the Deathly Hallows – Part 2, The King's Speech, The Burma Conspiracy, The Tree of Life, and The Well Digger's Daughter
  - Patrick Doyle – Jig, La Ligne droite, and Thor
  - Clint Mansell – Black Swan, Faster, and Last Night
  - John Powell – Kung Fu Panda 2, Mars Needs Moms, and Rio
  - Hans Zimmer – The Dilemma, How Do You Know, Inception, Kung Fu Panda 2, Megamind, Pirates of the Caribbean: On Stranger Tides, and Rango

==== 2012 ====
- Alberto Iglesias – The Monk, The Skin I Live In, and Tinker Tailor Soldier Spy
  - Alexandre Desplat – A Better Life, Carnage, Extremely Loud & Incredibly Close, The Ides of March, Moonrise Kingdom, and Rust and Bone
  - Cliff Martinez – Contagion and Drive
  - Howard Shore – A Dangerous Method, Cosmopolis, and Hugo
  - John Williams – The Adventures of Tintin: The Secret of the Unicorn and War Horse

==== 2013 ====
- Mychael Danna – Life of Pi
  - Alexandre Desplat – Argo, Reality, Renoir, Rise of the Guardians, and Zero Dark Thirty
  - Danny Elfman – Epic, Frankenweenie, Hitchcock, Oz the Great and Powerful, Promised Land, and Silver Linings Playbook
  - James Newton Howard – After Earth and The Bourne Legacy
  - Thomas Newman – Side Effects and Skyfall

==== 2014 ====
- Alexandre Desplat – Godzilla, The Grand Budapest Hotel, Marius, The Monuments Men, Philomena, Venus in Fur, and Zulu
  - Marco Beltrami – Carrie, A Good Day to Die Hard, The Homesman, Snowpiercer, Warm Bodies, The Wolverine, and World War Z
  - Steven Price – Gravity and The World's End
  - Gabriel Yared – A Promise, In Secret, The Prophet, and Tom at the Farm
  - Hans Zimmer – 12 Years A Slave, The Lone Ranger, Man of Steel, and Rush

==== 2015 ====
- Michael Giacchino – Dawn of the Planet of the Apes, Inside Out, Jupiter Ascending, Jurassic World, and Tomorrowland
  - Bruno Coulais – Diary of a Chambermaid, Fly Away Solo, Gemma Bovery, Mune: Guardian of the Moon, Song of the Sea, and Three Hearts
  - Alexandre Desplat – Every Thing Will Be Fine, The Imitation Game, Tale of Tales, and Unbroken
  - Jóhann Jóhannsson – The 11th Hour, Sicario, and The Theory of Everything
  - Hans Zimmer – Chappie and Interstellar

==== 2016 ====
- Carter Burwell – Anomalisa, Carol, Hail, Caesar!, The Family Fang, The Finest Hours, and Legend
  - Ennio Morricone – Come What May, The Correspondence, and The Hateful Eight
  - Thomas Newman – Bridge of Spies, Finding Dory, and Spectre
  - Daniel Pemberton – From the Land of the Moon, The Man from U.N.C.L.E., and Steve Jobs
  - John Williams – The BFG and Star Wars: The Force Awakens

==== 2017 ====
- Jóhann Jóhannsson – Arrival
  - Nicholas Britell – Moonlight
  - Justin Hurwitz – La La Land
  - Mica Levi – Jackie and Marjorie Prime
  - Dustin O'Halloran – Iris (co-composed by Adam Wiltzie) and Lion (co-composed by Hauschka)

==== 2018 ====
- Jóhann Jóhannsson – Last and First Man, Mandy, Mary Magdalene, and The Mercy
  - Carter Burwell – Goodbye Christopher Robin and Three Billboards Outside Ebbing, Missouri
  - Alexandre Desplat – Endangered Species, Isle of Dogs, The Shape of Water, Suburbicon, and Valerian and the City of a Thousand Planets
  - Jonny Greenwood – Phantom Thread
  - John Williams – The Post and Star Wars: The Last Jedi

==== 2019 ====
- Nicholas Britell – If Beale Street Could Talk and Vice
  - Daniel Pemberton – Scarborough, Spider-Man: Into the Spider-Verse, and Yesterday
  - John Powell – How to Train Your Dragon: The Hidden World
  - Alan Silvestri – Avengers: Endgame and Welcome to Marwen
  - Benjamin Wallfisch – Hellboy, King of Thieves, Serenity, Shazam!, and The Vanishing

=== 2020s ===
==== 2020 ====
- Hildur Guðnadóttir – Joker
  - Alexandre Desplat – Adults in the Room, An Officer and a Spy, and Little Women
  - Thomas Newman – 1917
  - Benjamin Wallfisch – The Invisible Man and It Chapter Two
  - John Williams – Star Wars: The Rise of Skywalker

==== 2021 ====
- Daniel Pemberton – Enola Holmes, Rising Phoenix, and The Trial of the Chicago 7
  - Nainita Desai – American Murder: The Family Next Door, Behind Personality Tests, The Reason I Jump, and Persona: The Dark Truth
  - James Newton Howard – News of the World and Raya and the Last Dragon
  - Emile Mosseri – Kajillionaire and Minari
  - Trent Reznor, Atticus Ross & Jon Batiste – Soul

==== 2022 ====
- Jonny Greenwood – The Power of the Dog and Spencer
  - Germaine Franco – Encanto
  - Daniel Hart – The Green Knight and The Last Letter from Your Lover
  - Alberto Iglesias – Parallel Mothers
  - Daniel Pemberton – The Bad Guys, Being the Ricardos, Brian and Charles, and The Rescue
  - Hans Zimmer – Dune, No Time to Die, and The Survivor

==== 2023 ====
- Volker Bertelmann – All Quiet on the Western Front, Memory of Water, and War Sailor
  - Carter Burwell – The Banshees of Inisherin, Catherine Called Birdy, and To Catch a Killer
  - Alexandre Desplat – Asteroid City, A Cooler Climate, Guillermo del Toro's Pinocchio, The Lost King, and Tirailleurs (Father & Soldier)
  - Hildur Guðnadóttir – Tár and Women Talking
  - Daniel Pemberton – Amsterdam, Enola Holmes 2, See How They Run, and Spider-Man: Across the Spider-Verse
  - John Williams – The Fabelmans and Indiana Jones and the Dial of Destiny

==== 2024 ====
- Jerskin Fendrix – Kinds of Kindness and Poor Things
  - Ludwig Göransson – Oppenheimer
  - Laura Karpman – American Fiction, The Marvels, and Rock Hudson: All That Heaven Allowed
  - Anthony Willis – Saltburn
  - Hans Zimmer – The Creator and Dune: Part Two

==== 2025 ====
- Volker Bertelmann – Conclave and The Amateur
  - Daniel Blumberg – The Brutalist
  - Kris Bowers – The Wild Robot
  - Clément Ducol and Camille – Emilia Pérez
  - Alberto Iglesias – The Room Next Door
  - John Powell – How to Train Your Dragon

==== 2026 ====
- Daniel Pemberton – The Bad Guys 2, The Drama, Masters of the Universe, and Project Hail Mary
  - Alexandre Desplat – Eagles of the Republic, Frankenstein, Jurassic World Rebirth, and L'homme qui rétrécit (The Shrinking Man)
  - Jonny Greenwood – One Battle After Another
  - Hildur Guðnadóttir – The Bride!, Hedda, and 28 Years Later: The Bone Temple
  - Max Richter – Hamnet
