= Lion (soundtrack) =

Lion (Original Motion Picture Soundtrack)

Film score by Dustin O'Halloran and Hauschka
- Released: 25 November 2016
- Recorded: 2016
- Genre: Film score
- Length: 48:40
- Label: Sony Classical
- Producers: Dustin O'Halloran; Hauschka

Dustin O'Halloran chronology
Equals (2016)	Lion (2016)	Queimafobia (2017)

Hauschka chronology
In Dubious Battle (2016)	Lion (2016)	The Current War (2017)

Lion (Original Motion Picture Soundtrack) is the soundtrack album to the 2016 film Lion. The album mostly features musical score composed by Dustin O'Halloran and Volker Bertelmann, known by the stage name Hauschka. This film marked their joint collaboration together in scoring films. The score consisted of piano, accompanied by strings, percussions and a minimal orchestra, to produce the score in a "subtle and restrained manner", to convey the emotions of Saroo, the film's protagonist. The score album, also featured a promotional single, "Never Give Up" by Sia. The album was distributed by Sony Classical Records and released in digital formats on 25 November 2016, and through CDs on 23 December. A vinyl edition of the album also released on 17 March 2017.

The score by O'Halloran and Hauschka received critical acclaim and featured in several year-end and decade-end lists of best film scores. The score also received nominations at various award ceremonies, including Academy, Golden Globe, BAFTA and Critics' Choice awards under the "Best Original Score" category, but lost all the awards to Justin Hurwitz for his score in La La Land (2016). However, O'Halloran and Hauschka won the AACTA Award for Best Original Music Score at the 7th AACTA Awards held in December 2017.

== Background ==
Both Hauschka and O'Halloran were good friends and had been collaborated in several of his concerts, Hauschka said "We had spent a lot of time in each other's world, and the thought of us making music together was pretty exciting because we'd been friends for so long." Davis approached Hauschka at one of his concerts in Melbourne and queried on his interest in scoring the film, though he later revealed on O'Halloran's involvement. Initially, Davis planned to assign each composer, a discrete portion of the film. Hauschka was assigned to score for the portions set in India, while O'Halloran would compose for the rest of the sequences. The plan was later scrapped as Davis wanted a "more holistic approach".

The composers recorded the score individually, with Hauschka recording his portions in Germany, and O'Halloran in Los Angeles. The latter said, in an interview to Deadline Hollywood, "You have to know that you can sit in a room with somebody, and feel comfortable, and get into it. We have such a respect for each other's music that I don't think we ever felt like it was a battle of ideas. We both wanted to do the best for the film, and Garth also had a very clear vision of what he wanted, so we were always trying to work together to find the best ideas, and the things that would resonate the most." The score was recording within two months, due to the hectic release schedules.

== Recording and composition ==
O'Halloran and Hauschka recorded the score in "restrained and subtle way" to add nuances to the scenes. Davis wanted two pianists to complete the score, as the piano was an important instrumentation used while producing temp music. Both composers, decided to strip down the piano music, hence, strings were accompanied in the score in a "very quiet manner". A string quarter and an orchestra chamber ensemble assisted the score, while O'Halloran and Hauschka limited the use of electronics, and also used two pre-recorded piano sounds. They called it as "quite challenging to find diverse sounds of that instrument". O'Halloran added "To create the power and the emotional impact that we needed to happen in the film with a few elements means that the performances are vital, and the way it's recorded is vital. It was a lot of trial and error we had to go through to find the right space—it's such a curated score."

Davis was not attracted to the use of traditional Indian sounds in the first half and transitioning to a Western palette in the second half, as according to Hauschka, "separating the ‘Indian part' would have given the first half such a weird, detached, folky element [...] The theme of the movie is more general than that — it's a longing for home, for identity, for finding the kind of place where you feel safe."

On the use of the prepared piano, Hauschka had said that the instrument had a lot of specialities, and added "it can sound really like a drum, or extremely percussive. It can sound pretty detuned—even like a sitar sometimes. It can actually change from key to key because I'm preparing each key quite different." Hauschka revealed the interesting experiment of scoring the film, is "where one can play in one instrument all sorts of different sounds that, in a way, sound a little bit like a band, or like many instruments at the same time". He used this approach, for a sequence where the body snatchers try to kidnap young Saroo, he played the percussive pieces to create a "haunting feeling", while also used the piano as a drum, and using very muted notes, being repeated faster. In addition, he also used the string instruments while scoring. Hauschka used an EBow—an instrument device used for playing guitar, that does a steady kind of note—has been complimented for creating drones inside the piano. He added that it is "a mixture of getting a kind of density with all sorts of sounds, and at the same time, sometimes the metal, string sound is appearing in a pretty strange way".

== Musical themes ==
Hauschka described one of the pieces in the score, titled "Train", where it does not stand for the movement of the train, but much more for the emotional state of Saroo. He added the composition, saying "There is some driving momentum in these arpeggios from the strings, but when I saw the train going over the bridge, and you see the lightening and the thunder in the back, I really felt like a violin has to play a very wild arpeggio. I was not really thinking about the train as a moving vehicle, to make a sound or a score for that." Another train cue is played when a grown Saroo is on the train, and also felt that the repetitive patterns move in the same way as the train, which provides a "distinct character to the music".

Davis wanted the main theme to "have different variations" as it was "an epic story, and it's a tale of constant momentum. There's searching, and longing, and there was something that he really wanted to be able to represent through the film, and not just have individual pieces of music. It needed to feel connected." The theme came up with a minimalistic piece of music and simple, but both composers took a long time to find the right balance between the chords which are "emotional" and "could tell the story" and also feels "honest". After the main theme unlocked, Davis felt excited about the cue and its production, resulting the duo to create different versions of those tracks.

== Songs ==
The album featured a promotional single titled "Never Give Up" written especially for the film. Australian singer-songwriter Sia wrote and recorded the track, which was an electropop ballad, with influences of Indian music. The song was licensed by Sony Classical Records and released by Monkey Puzzle label exclusively on 16 November 2016 in all music platforms. A lyrical video, inspired by the film's storyline and featuring the artist, released in January 2017.

The songs that are featured in the film, but not in the soundtrack includes: "The Sun, The Sand And The Sea" (Jimmy Radcliffe), "Urvasi Urvasi" (A. R. Rahman), "Blind" (Hercules and Love Affair), "State of the Heart" (Mondo Rock), "The Rivers of Belief" (Enigma), "Come Closer" (Bappi Lahiri), "The Elephant's Trouble" (Cage), "Red Light Song" (Hugo Nicolson), "Nobody Knows" (Thomas L. Barrett), "Chanda Ko Dhoondhne Sabhi Taare Nikal Pade" (Laxmikant–Pyarelal), "Aaja Nindiya Aaja Nainan Beech Sama Ja" (Mohammed Zahur Khayyam), "Parade" (Will and James Ragar) and "Atomos VII" and "Atomos XII", which are jointly produced by O'Halloran and Adam Wiltzie and performed by A Winged Victory for the Sullen.

== Track listing ==
All tracks are written by Dustin O'Halloran and Hauschka, except where noted.

No.	Title	Length
1.	"Never Give Up (by Sia)"	3:42
2.	"Lion Theme"	1:58
3.	"Train"	1:38
4.	"Lost (Part One)"	3:06
5.	"River"	1:27
6.	"Escape The Station"	2:25
7.	"Orphans"	1:37
8.	"A New Home"	1:54
9.	"Family"	1:04
10.	"School"	0:38
11.	"Memories"	1:52
12.	"Lost (Part Two)"	2:31
13.	"Falling Downward"	3:05
14.	"Searching For Home"	2:16
15.	"Memory / Connection / Time"	1:40
16.	"Layers Expanding Time"	5:31
17.	"Home Is With Me"	3:15
18.	"Arrival"	4:26
19.	"Mother"	4:28

== Critical reception ==
Lion's original score received critical acclaim, praising O'Halloran and Hauschka's musical approach. Jonathan Broxton of Movie Music UK felt that " There's nothing wrong with it, compositionally speaking, and it's pleasant enough to listen to as a standalone piece of music, but its so understated and careful, so safe and restrained, and takes so many pains to avoid being manipulative, that it renders itself redundant." James Southall of Movie Wave wrote "The score is generally quietly dignified, at its best in its delicate main theme, an emotional piece for piano and strings, heard fully in the opening score track “Lion Theme” and in an exquisite variation later in “Orphans”. There's deliberately no ethnic tint to the music – the composers viewed this as a human story and his Indian origin was irrelevant. Whether that would have given it a bit of flavour that it generally lacks – it's all very pleasant, the album is perfectly nice to listen to, but it doesn't leave much of a lasting impression." Marcy Donelson of Allmusic opined "though, it stays within a low dynamic range, all to serve the quiet sorrow of an emotional story that comes to terms with different forms of loss."

Bryan Durham of Daily News and Analysis called the music as "soul-stirring", while A. O. Scott of The New York Times opined that the music, "floods the viewer with big feelings". Edward Douglas of Den of Geek wrote "the perfectly-crafted score by musicians Hauschka and Dustin O'Halloran that effectively builds on the emotions without feeling manipulative". Several websites such as Collider, Paste Magazine, IndieWire and Nylon, listed it as "one of the best film scores of 2016", while Collider, IndieWire, Consequence, Film School Rejects and RogerEbert.com, called it as "one of the best scores of the decade".

== Chart performance ==
Chart (2016–17)	Peak position
Belgian Albums (Ultratop Flanders)	181
Belgian Albums (Ultratop Wallonia)	127
French Albums (SNEP)	171
UK Soundtrack Albums (OCC)	13
US Billboard 200	95
US Soundtrack Albums (Billboard)	17

== Accolades ==
Award	Date of ceremony	Category	Recipient(s) and nominee(s)	Result	Ref.
AACTA Awards	6 December 2017	Best Original Music Score	Volker Bertelmann, Dustin O'Halloran	Won	
Academy Awards	26 February 2017	Best Original Score	Dustin O'Halloran and Hauschka	Nominated	
British Academy Film Awards	12 February 2017	Best Original Music	Dustin O'Halloran and Hauschka	Nominated	
Critics' Choice Awards	11 December 2016	Best Score	Dustin O'Halloran and Hauschka	Nominated	
Golden Globe Awards	8 January 2017	Best Original Score	Dustin O'Halloran and Hauschka	Nominated	
Grammy Awards	28 January 2018	Best Song Written for Visual Media	"Never Give Up" – Sia Furler (performer, songwriter) and Greg Kurstin (producer)	Won	
Hollywood Music in Media Awards	17 November 2016	Best Original Score – Feature Film	Dustin O'Halloran and Hauschka	Nominated	
