= Atomos (album) =

Studio album by A Winged Victory for the Sullen
- Released: October 6, 2014
- Recorded: Summer 2013
- Genres: Ambient; modern classical; drone
- Length: 61:07
- Labels: Kranky, Erased Tapes

A Winged Victory for the Sullen chronology
A Winged Victory for the Sullen (2011)	Atomos (2014)	The Undivided Five (2019)

Professional ratings
Aggregate scores
Source	Rating
Metacritic	81/100
Review scores
Source	Rating
AllMusic	4/5 stars
Clash	9/10
Exclaim!	8/10
The Line of Best Fit	8/10
Mojo	4/5 stars
MusicOMH	4.5/5 stars
Pitchfork	7.3/10
Q	4/5 stars
The Skinny	5/5 stars
Tiny Mix Tapes	3/5 stars

Atomos is the second album by ambient music duo A Winged Victory for the Sullen. The album was released on October 6, 2014 on the labels Erased Tapes and Kranky.

The album contains the music from Atomos, a dance piece by choreographer Wayne McGregor and his company Wayne McGregor Random Dance. The music was recorded in Summer 2013, in studios in Brussels, Berlin and Reykjavík. Regarding the recording process, pianist Dustin O'Halloran has commented: "We never imagined 2013 would be such an explosively creative year. The first record took us two years from start to finish, but in the micro span of time over last summer we were able to change the formula for the way we write, record, and let go. It was incredibly liberating." The dance piece premiered at Sadler's Wells, London, on 9 October 2013.

The album was preceded by the Atomos VII EP, which was released on April 28, 2014. Besides the title track, the EP also contained 'Minuet For A Cheap Piano Number One' (an outtake from the A Winged Victory for the Sullen album sessions) and a reinterpretation of 'Atomos VII' by Australian composer Ben Frost.

== Track listing ==
No.	Title	Length
1.	"Atomos I"	10:22
2.	"Atomos II"	4:19
3.	"Atomos III"	4:56
4.	"Atomos V"	4:12
5.	"Atomos VI"	7:24
6.	"Atomos VII"	7:51
7.	"Atomos VIII"	5:14
8.	"Atomos IX"	4:16
9.	"Atomos X"	4:18
10.	"Atomos XI"	5:26
11.	"Atomos XII"	4:09
Total length:		61:07

== Personnel ==
- Charlotte Danhier - Cello
- Francesco Donadello - Engineer, Mixing
- Ben Frost - Engineer
- Nayon Han - Cello
- Christelle Heinen - Cello
- Margaret Hermant - Harp, Violin
- Arthur Hornig - Cello
- Isabelle Klemt - Cello
- Bo Kondren - Mastering
- Neil Leiter - Viola
- Craig McCaffrey - Artwork
- Dustin O'Halloran - Arranger, Composer, Engineer, Primary Artist, Score
- Sophie Bayet - Violin
- Adam Bryanbaum Wiltzie - Arranger, Composer, Engineer, Primary Artist, Score
- A Winged Victory for the Sullen - Primary Artist

Credits adapted from AllMusic.
