= A Winged Victory for the Sullen (album) =

Studio album by A Winged Victory for the Sullen
- Released: 8 September 2011
- Recorded: 2009–2011
- Studio: Grunewald Church (Berlin); DDR P4 Funkhaus (Berlin); Begijnhof (Brussels); Schlaff Klang (Berlin); Jet (Brussels); BlackMirror (Udine)
- Genre: Ambient; contemporary classical; drone; post-rock
- Length: 44:31
- Label: Erased Tapes; Kranky

A Winged Victory for the Sullen chronology
A Winged Victory for the Sullen (2011)	Atomos (2014)

A Winged Victory for the Sullen is the debut studio album by the ambient music duo A Winged Victory for the Sullen. It was released on 8 September 2011 on Erased Tapes Records and Kranky. Recorded over a two-year period at six studios throughout Europe, A Winged Victory for the Sullen features extensive use of natural reverb and combines classical instrumentation with soundscapes and drones. In addition to members Dustin O'Halloran and Adam Wiltzie, the album features several prominent collaborators, including Hildur Guðnadóttir and Nils Frahm.

Upon its release A Winged Victory for the Sullen was well received by music critics in both Europe and North America, with particular praise for its instrumentation and atmosphere. The album placed in several publications' year-end best-of lists and charted in Belgium and United States, where it peaked at number 2 on the Billboard New Age Albums chart. A Winged Victory for the Sullen supported the album with a North American tour in the fall and winter of 2011, performing with the American Contemporary Music Ensemble and Benoît Pioulard.

== Recording ==
A Winged Victory for the Sullen was recorded at six recording studios throughout Europe from 2009 to 2011. The earliest session for the album was a late-night piano recording session at Grunewald Church in Berlin, Germany with Nils Frahm; additional string accompaniments were recorded at DDR Studio P4 Funkhaus, a former East German radio station in Berlin, with Jean-Boris Szymczak. Members Dustin O'Halloran and Adam Wiltzie recorded further material alone at Begijnhof in Brussels, Belgium and Schlaff Klang in Berlin, as well as Jet Studio in Brussels with Arnaud Duchayne. The final sessions were held at BlackMirror Studios, a private studio in Udine, Italy, with Francesco Donadello.

Donadello subsequently mixed A Winged Victory for the Sullen in a 17th-century villa outside of Ferrara, Italy and Bo Kondren mastered the album at Calyx in Berlin. All recordings for A Winged Victory for the Sullen were "processed completely analogue straight to magnetic tape".

"Minuet for a Cheap Piano Number One", an outtake from the sessions for A Winged Victory for the Sullen, was included as a track on the duo's succeeding extended play, Atomos VII (2014).

== Composition ==
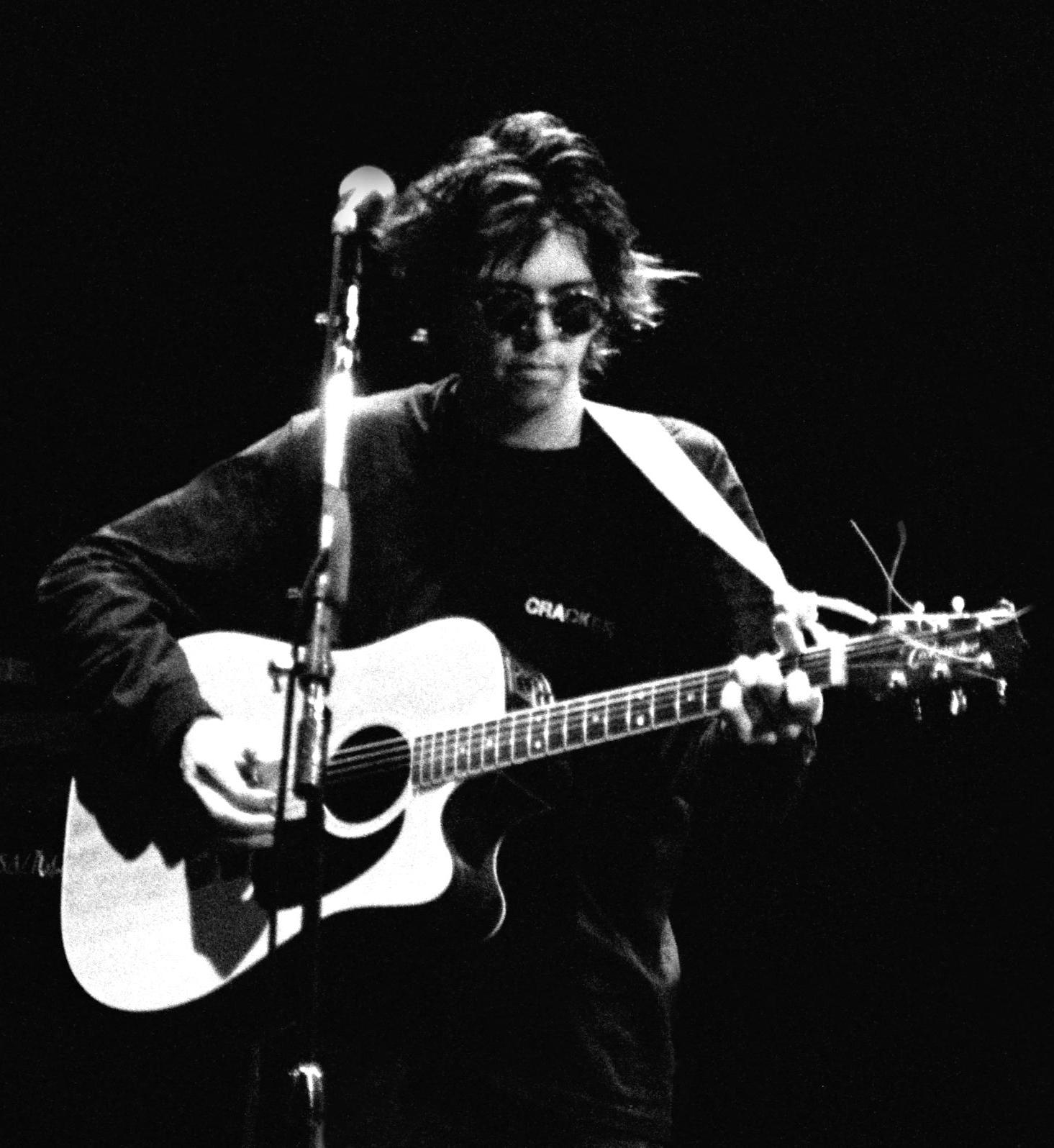
One of A Winged Victory for the Sullen's tracks was written in memory of Sparklehorse frontman Mark Linkous (pictured in 1992)

A Winged Victory for the Sullen contains seven tracks and has been classified as ambient, contemporary classical, drone and post-rock. The album's sound was defined by its various writing and recording environments, which included the use of large reverberant spaces. Dustin O'Halloran sought out a selection of nine-foot grand pianos–including a 1950s imperial Bösendorfer piano and a handmade Fazioli–and performed in these spaces to "deliver extreme sonic low end". Adam Wiltzie's "drifting guitar washed melodies" were also noted as juxtaposing the more-traditional instrumentation, such as cello, violin, viola, harp, French horn and bassoon.

Though O'Halloran was known for his compositions as a classical pianist and Wiltzie for his work in ambient music, the duo "almost swapped places at times", with Wiltzie writing piano segments and O'Halloran creating soundscapes. Of the experience Wiltzie said: "We composed this record to the point that we let go of our own strengths ... it is the true definition of a collaboration. We let go of our egos and found a way to trust each other."

Wiltzie described the emotional situation of composing A Winged Victory for the Sullen as "very, very melancholy" due to both he and O'Halloran experiencing "some sea changes" in their personal lives. "Requiem for the Static King Part One", the album's second track, was written in memory of Mark Linkous, a friend of the duo who died by suicide in March 2010.

== Packaging ==
A Winged Victory for the Sullen named themselves and the album after Winged Victory of Samothrace, a Hellenistic sculpture from the 2nd-century BC. Christina Vantzou, a composer and filmmaker with whom Adam Wiltzie had previously formed The Dead Texan, provided the illustration Nips and Lips as the front cover art. Craig McCaffrey further assisted with the overall artwork.

== Release ==
A Winged Victory for the Sullen was released on 8 September 2011 in Europe and 11 September in the United Kingdom—both on Erased Tapes Records—and on 12 September on Kranky in North America. It was issued on CD and LP and made available as a digital download; a limited number of white-label test pressings were also released. "Steep Hills of Vicodin Tears", A Winged Victory for the Sullen's fifth track, was made available as a stream in July 2011, a month after the album's original announcement.

In support of the album's release, A Winged Victory for the Sullen underwent a 13-date North American tour, beginning in Philadelphia, Pennsylvania on 29 October 2011 and concluding on 15 November in Los Angeles, California. O'Halloran and Wiltzie were accompanied by the American Contemporary Music Ensemble during the performances; Benoît Pioulard and Ken Camden–both labelmates of the duo from Kranky–were the support acts for the tour.

A Winged Victory for the Sullen charted in Belgium, where it entered and peaked at number 46 on the Ultratop albums chart. It remained on the chart for a further four weeks. The album also charted in the United States, peaking at number 2 on the Billboard New Age Albums chart.

== Reception ==
Professional ratings
Aggregate scores
Source	Rating
Metacritic	83/100
Review scores
Source	Rating
AllMusic	4/5 stars
The Arts Desk	4/5 stars
Clash	6/10
Drowned in Sound	9/10
Mojo	4/5 stars
musicOMH	4.5/5 stars
Pitchfork	7.3/10
Sputnikmusic	5/5
Tiny Mix Tapes	4.5/5 stars
Uncut	8/10

Upon its release A Winged Victory for the Sullen received positive reviews. At Metacritic, which assigns a normalized rating out of 100 to reviews from mainstream publications, the album received an average score of 83, based on 10 reviews, indicating "universal acclaim". BBC Music's David Sheppard called the album a "meditative and cinematic set" that "is a victory for subtlety [and] sensitivity" and "rich in melody", praising in particular its "genuinely haunting, numinous atmosphere". AllMusic reviewer Ned Raggett awarded the album a four-out-of-five-star rating and said there was "a knowing playfulness with the conventions of moodily beautiful 21st century drone/ambient". He further said A Winged Victory for the Sullen as a duo were "less about full-on beautiful drones than Stars of the Lid often were" but that "there's a similar appreciation for the slowly unfolding and the calmly insular". In a six-out-of-ten review for Clash, Gareth James referred to the album as "gently affecting", "the most delicate of drone albums and in some circumstances ... can seem truly euphoric". However, James also added that "it runs the risk of drifting anonymously into the background", summarizing the album as "a beautiful recording but an occasional listen".

Writing for Contactmusic.com, Jordan Dowling said A Winged Victory for the Sullen "is not merely background music, as music of a similar ilk is sometimes lazily and sometimes correctly dismissed, but music to get lost in" in an eight-out-of-ten review. Pitchfork awarded the album a 7.3 rating, with reviewer Joe Tangari concluding the music "moves more than drone and feels thicker than minimalism"; Tangari further praised O'Halloran and Wiltzie's ability to allow the strings to "move in and out of focus ... creat[ing] all these otherworldly sounds using only traditional instruments". In a four-and-a-half-out-of-five review in Tiny Mix Tapes, Max Power called A Winged Victory for the Sullen "thorough and deeply felt music", concluding: "composed by two musicians at the height of their craft, the album reveals itself, thus far, as the apex of a limited genre still forming and as one of our finest contemporary acts of remembrance and ascension". Mojo awarded the album four-of-out-five stars, calling it "an immersive, and inevitably cinematic, ambient gem", while Uncut rated it eight out of ten and said it was "another triumph for the post-classical scene".

A Winged Victory for the Sullen was featured in several publications' year-end lists. The album was ranked number 16 on Drowned in Sound's "Albums of the Year", number 22 on musicOMH's "Top 50 Albums of 2011" and number 46 on Tiny Mix Tapes' "Favorite 50 Albums of 2011".

== Track listing ==
All music is composed by Dustin O'Halloran and Adam Bryanbaum Wiltzie.

No.	Title	Length
1.	"We Played Some Open Chords and Rejoiced, For the Earth Had Circled the Sun Yet Another Year"	6:18
2.	"Requiem for the Static King Part One"	2:45
3.	"Requiem for the Static King Part Two"	7:37
4.	"Minuet for a Cheap Piano Number Two"	3:09
5.	"Steep Hills of Vicodin Tears"	4:26
6.	"A Symphony Pathetique"	12:41
7.	"All Farewells Are Sudden"	7:35
Total length:		44:31

== Personnel ==
All personnel credits adapted from A Winged Victory for the Sullen's album notes.

A Winged Victory for the Sullen

- Dustin O'Halloran – arrangement, scoring, performance
- Adam Bryanbaum Wiltzie – arrangement, scoring, performance

Additional performers

- Rozanne Descheemaeker – French horn
- Peter Broderick – violin
- Marlene Ito – violin
- Elissa Lee – violin
- Chester Desmond – harp
- Kristina Labitzke – viola
- Chris Jepson – cello
- Hildur Guðnadóttir – cello
- Hugo Barone – bassoon

Technical personnel

- Dustin O'Halloran – recording
- Adam Bryanbaum Wiltzie – recording
- Arnaud Duchayne – recording
- Francesco Donadello – recording, mixing
- Nils Frahm – recording
- Jean-Boris Szymczak – recording
- Bo Kondren – mastering

Design personal

- Christina Vantzou – illustration, cover art
- Craig McCaffrey – artwork assistance

== Chart positions ==
Chart (2011)	Peak position
Belgian Albums (Ultratop Flanders)	46
U.S. New Age Albums (Billboard)	2

== Release history ==
Region	Date	Format(s)	Label	Catalog
Europe	8 September 2011	CD	Erased Tapes Records	ERATP032CD
Europe	8 September 2011	LP	Erased Tapes Records	ERATP032LP
Europe	8 September 2011	Digital download	Erased Tapes Records	ERATP032DL/ERATP032DM
United Kingdom	11 September 2011	CD · LP · digital download	Erased Tapes Records	ERATP032
United States	12 September 2011	CD · LP · digital download	Kranky	KRANK 157
