= Night Melody =

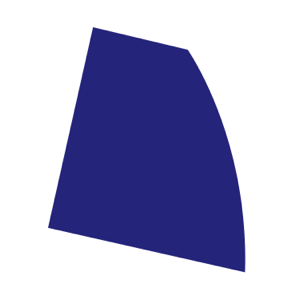

Studio album by Rival Consoles
- Released: 5 August 2016
- Genre: Electronic
- Length: 33:43
- Label: Erased Tapes

Rival Consoles chronology
Howl (2015)	Night Melody (2016)	Persona (2018)

Professional ratings
Aggregate scores
Source	Rating
AnyDecentMusic?	6.9/10
Metacritic	75/100
Review scores
Source	Rating
AllMusic	3.5/5 stars
Drowned in Sound	7/10
Exclaim!	7/10
Mixmag	7/10
Pitchfork	8.0/10

Night Melody is the fourth studio album by British electronic musician Ryan Lee West, performing under his stage name Rival Consoles. It was released on 5 August 2016, Erased Tapes Records.

== Production ==
Writing for Night Melody began in late-2015, at the same time West's third album Howl was released. West had just come out of a 13-year relationship, inspiring the release of his fourth studio album. In response to the release, West said: "I’ve been working on the mini album for four or five months straight. And I don’t mean that in the glamorous way. It’s been destroying my brain; there’s been a lot of problem solving. The ideas themselves always come quickly, it’s more the second stage of making things better and solving problems."

== Critical reception ==
Night Melody was met with "generally favorable" reviews from critics. At Metacritic, which assigns a weighted average rating out of 100 to reviews from mainstream publications, this release received an average score of 75, based on 6 reviews. Aggregator Album of the Year gave the release a 72 out of 100 based on a critical consensus of 7 reviews.

Writing for AllMusic, Paul Simpson said "The short album is relatively straightforward, with six tracks of subdued, atmospheric techno -- no filler, no beating around the bush. The album isn't quite as dark or sad as one might expect, given the context. It seems like a logical extension of the path he's been taking with his previous few recordings." Stephen Proski of Drowned in Sound wrote "Night Melody was developed as a result of the incarcerated experience of working in abject environments with digital technology: the haunting yet comforting background noise of a hard drive humming. West, when left alone to his devices, is able to transform emotion into the esoteric, colluding synthesis into vibrant, organic swaths of sound." The staff at Mixmag praised West for a richer and more complex sound than his previous releases.

== Track listing ==
Night Melody track listing
No.	Title	Length
1.	"Pattern of the North"	5:50
2.	"Johannesburg"	7:22
3.	"Slow Song"	3:52
4.	"Lone"	5:55
5.	"Night Melody"	5:22
6.	"What Sorrow"	5:22

== Charts ==
Chart performance for Night Melody
Chart (2016)	Peak position
UK Dance Albums (OCC)	18
