= Devics =

American indie rock band

Dēvics
- Origin: Los Angeles, California, United States
- Genres: Dream pop, alternative, Slowcore
- Years active: 1993–present
- Label: Bella Union
- Spinoffs: A Winged Victory for the Sullen
- Members: Sara Lov (vocals); Dustin O'Halloran (guitar/keyboards); Edward Maxwell (Upright bass); Theodore Liscinski (bass)
- Past members: Evan Schnabel (drums)
- Website: http://www.devics.com/ (defunct)

Formed in 1993, Devics (stylized as Dēvics) is an American indie rock band from Los Angeles, California, United States, consisting of Sara Lov, Dustin O'Halloran, Ed Maxwell, Theodore Liscinski, and Evan Schnabel. Their music can be described as melancholic. They have been largely inactive since 2006.

== History ==
Lov and O'Halloran formed the Devics in 1993, they were based in Los Angeles.

In 1996, the band released its debut album, Buxom, on their own record label Splinter Records. They recorded their second album late 1997 early 1998, with it being released later in 1998.

In 2001, The song Key is performed by the band in the bar called The Bronze in Buffy the Vampire Slayer during the fifth season, in an episode titled "Crush". The song's lyrics relate to the character Spike's struggle to overcome the pain of being a true vampire, which is caused by a chip implanted in his brain by a government agency.

In 2009, Devics covered The Cure's "Catch" for the American Laundromat Records produced compilation Just Like Heaven - a tribute to The Cure. It was recorded by Pall Jenkins of the Black Heart Procession.

In 2011, O'Halloran said of Devics that, "It helped [him] to understand how to write, and where it comes from." He also mentioned that he has the neurological condition synesthesia.

In 2014, Devics song “Salty Seas” was used as the credits song for episode four of Telltale’s “The Walking Dead: Season Two”.

=== Other musical projects ===
Devics have largely been inactive since 2006, with both Lov and O'Halloran pursuing separate music careers. Lov started releasing music under her own name in 2008. O'Halloran has released solo work since 2004; he has worked on soundtracks and as a duo in A Winged Victory for the Sullen.

== Discography ==
=== Albums ===
- 1996 Buxom (Splinter Records)
- 1998 If You Forget Me... (Splinter Records)
- 2001 My Beautiful Sinking Ship (Bella Union, V2 Records)
- 2003 The Stars at Saint Andrea (Bella Union)
- 2006 Push the Heart (Bella Union, Reincarnation Records)

=== EPs and singles ===
- 1994 Peresoso (7", Splinter Records)
- 2000 The Ghost in the Girl (EP)
- 2003 Red Morning (7", CD single, Bella Union)
- 2003 Ribbons (EP, Bella Union)
- 2005 Distant Radio (EP, Leftwing Records)
