= Landscape from Memory =

Studio album by Rival Consoles
- Released: 4 July 2025
- Length: 58:10
- Label: Erased Tapes
- Producer: Ryan Lee West

Rival Consoles chronology
Now Is (2022)	Landscape from Memory (2025)

Singles from Landscape from Memory
- 1. "Catherine" Released: 19 March 2025

Landscape from Memory is the ninth studio album by British electronic musician Rival Consoles. It was released on 4 July 2025 via Erased Tapes in LP, CD and digital formats.

== Background ==
Consisting of fourteen tracks ranging between two and five minutes each, with a total runtime of approximately fifty-eight minutes, the album was preceded by Consoles' 2022 project, Now Is. The first single, "Catherine", was released on 19 March 2025.

== Reception ==
Professional ratings
Review scores
Source	Rating
AllMusic	3.5/5 stars
Mojo	3/5 stars
MusicOMH	4/5 stars
The Skinny	4/5 stars
Uncut	7/10 stars

Stephen Worthy of Mojo noted, "Landscape from Memory might possess an air of melancholia, but ultimately eschews maudlin," rating it three stars. Stephen Dalton of Uncut remarked, "Informed by West's love of shoegaze and avant-classical music, Landscape From Memory surges and pulses with emotionally charged, meticulously detailed, luminescent electronica that never panders to the gridded restrictions of conventional techno," giving it a seven out of ten rating.

Charlotte Krol of DJ Mag wrote in her review of the album, "Landscape from Memory hears West tackle writer's block by resurrecting audio ideas he'd consigned to a scrapbook. The effect is like peering into a diary, amorphous memories traced by time, soundtracked by intimate club scuffle and mournful mood boards." Ben Hogwood of MusicOMH rated the album four stars, describing it as "a strong album that only gets better as repeated plays unlock its twists, turns and multi-level vistas. Full of positive energy, this is electronic music at its most instinctive."

The Skinny's Lewis Wade, also rating it four stars, noted Landscape from Memory "continues his exploration of analogue synths and complex programming, though now with a greater emotional appeal, an open-hearted love letter compared to the occasionally opaque avant-gardisms of previous work." The album received a three and a half star from AllMusic, whose reviewer Paul Simpson remarked, "Landscape from Memory runs a little too long, with a few of the slower, less exciting tracks seeming unnecessary. That's not to say that it all sounds samey or lacks inspiration, however, and the record's best tracks are exceptional."

== Track listing ==
All tracks are written by Ryan Lee West.

Landscape from Memory track listing
No.	Title	Length
1.	"In Reverse"	4:08
2.	"Catherine"	5:23
3.	"Drum Song"	4:16
4.	"Soft Gradient Beckons"	2:56
5.	"Gaivotas"	4:36
6.	"Coda"	3:36
7.	"Known Shape"	5:10
8.	"Nocturne"	4:46
9.	"Jupiter"	4:05
10.	"In a Trance"	4:44
11.	"If Not Now"	3:02
12.	"2 Forms"	4:04
13.	"Tape Loop"	2:15
14.	"Landscape from Memory"	4:49
Total length:		58:10

== Personnel ==
Credits for Landscape from Memory adapted from Tidal.

- Catherine Ko Chen – artwork
- Zino Mikorey – mastering
- Anne Müller – cello on "If Not Now"
- Robert Raths – design, executive production
- Aneek Thapar – mixing assistance
- Ryan Lee West – mixing, production

== Charts ==
Chart performance for Landscape from Memory
Chart (2025)	Peak position
UK Albums Sales (OCC)	71
UK Dance Albums (OCC)	1
UK Independent Albums (OCC)	22
