= Fallen Trees =

Studio album by Lubomyr Melnyk
- Released: 7 December 2018
- Genre: Classical; avant garde
- Length: 44:13
- Label: Erased Tapes

Lubomyr Melnyk chronology
Rivers and Streams (2015)	Fallen Trees (2018)

Professional ratings
Aggregate scores
Source	Rating
AnyDecentMusic?	7.6/10
Metacritic	82/100
Review scores
Source	Rating
AllMusic	4/5 stars
Drowned in Sound	8/10
Exclaim!	8/10
The Line of Best Fit	8/10
PopMatters	8/10

Fallen Trees is a studio album by Ukrainian composer and pianist Lubomyr Melnyk. It was released on 7 December 2018, Erased Tapes Records.

== Critical reception ==
Fallen Trees was met with "universal acclaim" reviews from critics. At Metacritic, which assigns a weighted average rating out of 100 to reviews from mainstream publications, this release received an average score of 82 based on 8 reviews. Aggregator Album of the Year gave the release an 80 out of 100 based on a critical consensus of 7 reviews.

Paul Simpson of AllMusic explained the release is "vast and detailed, but there's a rhythmic drive which the listener's mind hooks onto like a cable car." Simpson also went on to say, "Fallen Trees is an excellent example of Melnyk's artful and accessible form of music, which never sacrifices heart for sheer technical ability." Speaking on behalf of Drowned in Sound, Benjamin Bland said, "This, like the other excellent records he has given us since his belated emergence into the global limelight, is a work of quiet - but nonetheless defiant – beauty from a true great of contemporary classical music". Kevin Press of Exclaim! gave the release an 8 out of 10, writing: "At 70, Melnyk is producing some of the most physically demanding work of his career. And he's doing so in front of a bigger audience than he's ever enjoyed. This is a recording of a composer/performer very much at the top of his game."

== Track listing ==
Fallen Trees track listing
No.	Title	Length
1.	"Requiem for a Fallen Tree"	7:14
2.	"Son of Parasol"	7:37
3.	"Barcarolle"	8:01
4.	"Fallen Trees, Pt. 1: Preamble"	4:22
5.	"Fallen Trees, Pt. 2: Existence"	3:23
6.	"Fallen Trees, Pt. 3: Apparition"	6:29
7.	"Fallen Trees, Pt. 4: They Are Down"	3:45
8.	"Fallen Trees, Pt. 5: Not Forgotten"	3:22

== Charts ==
Chart performance for Fallen Trees
Chart (2018)	Peak position
US Top Classical Albums (Billboard)	21
