= Kiasmos (album) =

Studio album by Kiasmos
- Released: 27 October 2014
- Genre: Microhouse
- Label: Erased Tapes Records
- Producer: Kiasmos

Kiasmos is the 2014 debut album by the Faroese-Icelandic minimal experimental techno duo Kiasmos, composed of Ólafur Arnalds and Janus Rasmussen. It was released on 27 October 2014 on Erased Tapes Records.

== Reception ==
Professional ratings
Aggregate scores
Source	Rating
Metacritic	86/100
Review scores
Source	Rating
Drowned in Sound	8/10 stars
MusicOMH	4.5/5 stars
The 405	8.5/10 stars

Upon release, the album received critical acclaim. At Metacritic, which assigns a normalised rating out of 100 to reviews from mainstream critics, the album has received a score of 86, based on 5 reviews, which is categorized as "Universal acclaim".

== Track listing ==
No.	Title	Length
1.	"Lit"	6:25
2.	"Held"	5:01
3.	"Looped"	6:01
4.	"Swayed"	4:24
5.	"Thrown"	8:59
6.	"Dragged"	5:01
7.	"Bent"	5:45
8.	"Burnt"	9:21
