= The Dead Texan =

American audio-visual musical duo

- Origin: Austin, Texas, US
- Genres: Ambient, post-rock
- Years active: 2004–2007
- Label: Kranky
- Members: Adam Wiltzie; Christina Vantzou
- Website: http://www.brainwashed.com/sotl/deadtexan/

The Dead Texan was an ambient multimedia project consisting of sound engineer and composer Adam Wiltzie and filmmaker, composer and visual artist Christina Vantzou. The duo's only release, The Dead Texan, was released in 2004, with a subsequent three-year tour combining the album's music with visual material created by Vantzou specifically for the album. The original 2004 release was a CD/DVD package, followed by a later vinyl reissue of the LP in 2022. Given the apparent sentimental nature of the project, Vantzou has seemingly confirmed the end of the project following its first and only release.

Wiltzie is better known as one half of the ambient project Stars of the Lid. Following the release of The Dead Texan, Vantzou released a series of solo albums of ambient music composed for strings and synthesizers. The two have collaborated on other projects such as A Winged Victory for the Sullen (Vantzou is credited for the album artwork for their self-titled album), as well as Vantzou supporting Stars of the Lid during a live performance in New York City in 2016.

== History ==
Following the release of 2001's The Tired Sounds of Stars of the Lid, Wiltzie, in an interview with Brainwashed, protested that he and fellow Stars of the Lid collaborator Brian McBride were releasing too much music too quickly, and wished for their process of making and releasing music to be slower and more refined. He describes early collaboration with Christina Vantzou as 'incredibly easy' and a 'happy accident', where the duo each had opportunities to experiment in the other's primary medium (Wiltzie wrote most of the music while Vantzou created most of the visuals). Vantzou recalled feeling 'a little lost' as her involvement in the music of The Dead Texan began, stating that her involvement was also somewhat motivated by her desire to create a solo record of her own. She heavily contributed to musical elements as a matter of 'practical necessity'. Following the live tours promoting the album, the duo reflected on the album and decided to 'let the Dead Texan rest in peace'. The end of the project was a springboard for Vantzou's foray into solo music. Wiltzie wrote and recorded the music of the Dead Texan between 2001 and 2003 in Brussels. The tracks featured on The Dead Texan were initially intended to be released as another Stars of the Lid album, but it was ultimately deemed, as Wiltzie put it, "too aggressive."

There has been only one Dead Texan release, a self-titled CD/DVD package released on Kranky. The DVD is divided into seven sections which add up to a half hour's viewing time. The album features long, droning, ambient soundscapes and film samples reminiscent of Stars of the Lid - however The Dead Texan differs to Stars of the Lid by the addition of vocals in some tracks. Additionally, the tracks are considerably shorter in duration than most Stars of the Lid tracks.

== Discography ==
- The Dead Texan (Kranky, 2004)

== See also ==
- Christina Vantzou
- List of ambient music artists
- Stars of the Lid
