= Whelm =

Studio album by Douglas Dare
- Released: 13 May 2014
- Length: 41:34
- Label: Erased Tapes

Professional ratings
Aggregate scores
Source	Rating
Metacritic	83/100
Review scores
Source	Rating
AllMusic	4/5 stars
Clash	8/10
Drowned in Sound	7/10
Exclaim!	8/10
The Line of Best Fit	8.5/10
musicOMH	4/5 stars
The 405	8/10

Whelm is the debut studio album by English singer Douglas Dare. It was released in May 2014 under Erased Tapes Records.

== Track list ==
No.	Title	Length
1.	"Clockwork"	4:30
2.	"Nile"	4:37
3.	"Repeat"	4:00
4.	"Caroline"	4:48
5.	"Whelm"	1:46
6.	"Unrest"	3:46
7.	"Lungful"	4:00
8.	"Whitewash"	4:39
9.	"Swim"	4:39
10.	"London's Rose"	4:49
