= Never Give Up (Sia song) =

Single by Sia

from the album Lion (Original Motion Picture Soundtrack)
- Released: 18 November 2016
- Studio: Echo Studio (Los Angeles)
- Genre: Electropop
- Length: 3:41
- Label: Monkey Puzzle; Sony Classical
- Songwriters: Sia Furler; Greg Kurstin
- Producer: Greg Kurstin

Sia singles chronology
| "The Greatest" (2016) | "Never Give Up" (2016) | "Angel by the Wings" (2016) |

Lyric video
- "Never Give Up" on YouTube

"Never Give Up" is a song recorded by Sia, from the soundtrack of the Garth Davis-directed film, Lion (2016). Written by Sia and her producer Greg Kurstin, the song was released on 18 November 2016. It was nominated for a Grammy Award for Best Song Written For Visual Media. It is an electropop ballad, with influences of Indian music.

== Critical reception ==
Jon Blistein from Rolling Stone called it an "inspirational anthem." Sam Murphy from Music Feeds said, "Sia taps into the Indian roots of the film by delivering a Bollywood vibe beneath her characteristically sunny undertones." Lars Brandle in Billboard described it as a "powerful and uplifting" number. The song was nominated for a Grammy Award for Best Song Written for Visual Media.

== Lyric video ==
An accompanying lyric video was released on 3 January 2017. Inspired by the plot of the film, the clip follows a child and an older child with their faces shrouded, wearing half-blonde and -black Sia wigs, searching for each other in a deserted and ominous train station. As the video progresses, the kids reunite, scale a steely locomotive and follow the tracks out of the station and into the night. The song's lyrics appear spray-painted on various surfaces in the yard. Reviewing the clip, Vibe staff wrote that the singer "envisioned a journey of hope and faith between two conjoined souls in the visual experience."

== Credits ==
Adapted from Lion (Original Motion Picture Soundtrack) album liner.

- Chris Allgood – assistant mastering
- Julian Burg – engineer
- Sia Furler – lead and background vocals
- Alex Pasco – engineer
- Greg Kurstin – mixing, engineer, producer, tambura [tanpura], keyboards, drums, programming, percussion
- Emily Lazar – mastering

== Charts ==
=== Weekly charts ===
| Chart (2016–17) | Peak position |
|---|---|
| Australia (ARIA) | 29 |
| Austria (Ö3 Austria Top 40) | 12 |
| Czech Republic Airplay (ČNS IFPI) | 11 |
| France (SNEP) | 17 |
| Germany (GfK) | 8 |
| Germany (Airplay Chart) | 1 |
| Hungary (Rádiós Top 40) | 6 |
| Hungary (Single Top 40) | 16 |
| Luxembourg Digital Songs (Billboard) | 3 |
| Netherlands (Dutch Top 40) | 22 |
| Netherlands (Single Top 100) | 77 |
| Norway Digital Songs (Billboard) | 7 |
| Poland Airplay (ZPAV) | 51 |
| Romania (Media Forest) | 3 |
| Slovakia Airplay (ČNS IFPI) | 8 |
| Slovakia Singles Digital (ČNS IFPI) | 97 |
| Slovenia (SloTop50) | 6 |
| Switzerland (Schweizer Hitparade) | 33 |

=== Year-end charts ===
| Chart (2017) | Position |
|---|---|
| France (SNEP) | 149 |
| Germany (Official German Charts) | 92 |
| Hungary (Rádiós Top 40) | 95 |
| Hungary (Single Top 40) | 85 |
| Latvia Airplay (LaIPA) | 61 |
| Slovenia Airplay (SloTop50) | 12 |
| Switzerland (Schweizer Hitparade) | 98 |

== Certifications ==
| Region | Certification | Certified units/sales |
|---|---|---|
| Australia (ARIA) | Gold | 35,000^{‡} |
| France (SNEP) | Platinum | 133,333^{‡} |
| Germany (BVMI) | Platinum | 400,000^{‡} |
| New Zealand (RMNZ) | Gold | 15,000^{‡} |
| Poland (ZPAV) | Platinum | 50,000^{‡} |
^{‡} Sales+streaming figures based on certification alone.
