= Invisible Cities (album) =

2021 album by A Winged Victory for the Sullen

Studio album by A Winged Victory for the Sullen
- Released: 26 February 2021
- Length: 42:16
- Label: Artificial Pinearch; Ninja Tune
- Producer: Adam Wiltzie; Dustin O'Halloran

A Winged Victory for the Sullen chronology
The Undivided Five (2019)	Invisible Cities (2021)

Singles from Invisible Cities
- 1. "Desires are Already Memories" Released: 1 December 2020

Invisible Cities is the fourth studio album by ambient music duo A Winged Victory for the Sullen. It was released on 26 February 2021 by Artificial Pinearch in association with Ninja Tune. The album was composed as the score of a 90-minute multimedia theatre production that was inspired by Italo Calvino's 1972 novel of the same name. The record relies prominently on an instrumental production featuring piano chords, arpeggiated strings, and distortion. Music critics were generally favourable towards the album, with particular praise towards its instrumental soundscape.

== Background and release ==
Invisible Cities follows the duo's 2019 studio album The Undivided Five. The duo, composed of Adam Wiltzie and Dustin O'Halloran, have previously composed scores for numerous films and televisions, and so they were commissioned to compose the score for a 90-minute multimedia stage production directed by video designer Leo Warner. The album was essentially conceived as the score of the dance theatre production.

The production's stage was inspired by Italian writer Italo Calvino's post-modern novel Invisible Cities (1972), which was written as a string of conversations between Kublai Khan and Marco Polo. It premiered at the Manchester International Festival in July 2019. It was slated for a worldwide tour to follow, but the COVID-19 pandemic struck and all plans for tour events post-lockdown were scrapped, with the production practically shut down. Wiltzie explained in an interview:

Four months is not a lot of time to create 90 minutes of music for a production using classical theatre, dance and high res video mapping on a stage the size of two football pitches.

— Wiltzie on the album-making process, Exclaim!

The release of the album Invisible Cities was announced in December 2020, alongside the release of the album's cover art and tracklist. The track "Desires are Already Memories" was also delivered as the lead single from the album. The album was finally released on 26 February 2021 by Artificial Pinearch in partnership with Ninja Tune.

== Critical reception ==
Professional ratings
Aggregate scores
Source	Rating
AnyDecentMusic?	7.5/10
Metacritic	80/100
Review scores
Source	Rating
AllMusic	4/5 stars
Clash	8/10'
The Line of Best Fit	9/10
Mojo	4/5 stars
musicOMH	3.5/5 stars
PopMatters	7/10 stars
Pitchfork	6.9/10
Uncut	8/10

At Metacritic, which assigns a weighted average rating out of 100 to reviews from mainstream publications, the album received an average score of 80, based on nine reviews, indicating "generally favourable reviews". At AnyDecentMusic?, which collates album reviews from websites, magazines and newspapers, the album was given a 7.5 score out of 10, based on a critical consensus of seven reviews.

In The Line of Best Fit, Ray Honeybourne described the album as a "recognisable wide-angle instrumental soundscape" that incorporated "some intelligently-arranged vocal elements at key points, serving well to convey contrast and dramatic effects arising out of Marco Polo's verbal images." He further wrote that the record was a testament to the duo's "growing musical ambition and inventiveness." Pitchfork's Brian Howe believed that the album established the neoclassical-ambient template of the duo, being accompanied by "wide, spreading basses on the bottom, distorted melodies sharply etching the high end, and soft harmonies shifting in the abyssal middle." Nick Roseblade of Clash called the album "beguiling" and is "as rich as its subject matter". He further found the tracks "architecturally sound" that made the album "a musical flaneur."

Paul Simpson of AllMusic lauded the experimental music and instrumental production, and felt the record stood out "even without the choreography and high-res video projections". musicOMH's Steven Johnson wrote that the album retained the duo's "defining stylistic principles". He opined that although the compositional pieces were not "as diaphanous or as overtly sad as some of their previous work", they "are still sources of shimmering and slow-moving beauty." PopMatters writer Chris Ingalls praised the album as an "inspiring" and "invigorating" experience but felt that it lacked the "frenetic pace" needed to accompany such a collection of compositions.

== Track listing ==
All tracks were written and composed by Adam Wiltzie and Dustin O'Halloran.

Invisible Cities track listing
No.	Title	Length
1.	"So That the City Can Begin to Exist"	4:46
2.	"The Celestial City"	3:44
3.	"The Dead Outnumber the Living"	2:41
4.	"Every Solstice & Equinox"	2:24
5.	"Nothing of The City Touches the Earth"	3:10
6.	"Thirteenth Century Travelogue"	2:19
7.	"The Divided City"	2:53
8.	"Only Strings and Their Supports Remain"	3:42
9.	"There Is One of Which You Never Speak"	3:08
10.	"Despair Dialogue"	2:47
11.	"The Merchants of Seven Nations"	2:20
12.	"Desires Are Already Memories"	3:55
13.	"Total Perspective Vortex"	4:20
Total length:		42:16
