= Persona (Rival Consoles album) =

Studio album by Rival Consoles
- Released: 13 April 2018
- Length: 58:42
- Label: Erased Tapes
- Producer: Rival Consoles

Rival Consoles chronology
Night Melody (2016)	Persona (2018)	Articulation (2020)

Singles from Persona
- 1. "Unfolding" Released: 13 February 2018

Persona is the fifth studio album by English electronic musician Rival Consoles. It was released on 13 April 2018, by Erased Tapes.

== Critical reception ==
Professional ratings
Aggregate scores
Source	Rating
Metacritic	88/100
Review scores
Source	Rating
AllMusic	3.5/5 stars
The A.V. Club	A
Clash	7/10
Exclaim!	8/10
The Line of Best Fit	7.5/10
MusicOMH	4/5 stars
Paste	7.6/10
PopMatters	9/10
The Skinny	5/5 stars

Persona was met with widespread acclaim from critics. Sean O'Neal of The A.V. Club described the album as "A truly 'arthouse' album that begs repeated revisiting, to explore its many conflicting faces." Lewis Wade of The Skinny reviewed "Persona is a gloriously potent success story, and a testament to his talent that he's managed to make one of the warmest and most reflective albums of the year so far, electronic or otherwise."

== Track listing ==
All tracks written by Rival Consoles

No.	Title	Length
1.	"Unfolding"	5:57
2.	"Persona"	7:04
3.	"Memory Arc"	2:13
4.	"Phantom Grip"	5:12
5.	"Be Kind"	4:07
6.	"I Think So"	4:33
7.	"Sun's Abandon"	5:39
8.	"Dreamer's Wake"	5:04
9.	"Untravel"	5:51
10.	"Rest"	3:45
11.	"Hidden"	7:38
12.	"Fragment"	1:39

== Charts ==
Chart performance for Persona
Chart (2018)	Peak position
Scottish Albums (Official Charts)	84
UK Dance Albums (Official Charts)	9
UK Independent Albums (Official Charts)	16
