= Headwinds =

2011 film

- Theatrical release poster
- French: Des vents contraires
- Directed by: Jalil Lespert
- Starring: Benoît Magimel; Isabelle Carré
- Distributed by: Universal Pictures International France
- Release dates: 9 November 2011 (Cinemania); 14 December 2011 (France)
- Running time: 91 minutes
- Country: France
- Language: French

Headwinds (French: Des vents contraires) is a 2011 French drama film directed by Jalil Lespert.

== Cast ==
- Benoît Magimel as Paul Anderen
- Isabelle Carré as Josée Combe
- Antoine Duléry as Alex Anderen
- Ramzy Bedia as Le déménageur
- Bouli Lanners as Monsieur Bréhel
- Marie-Ange Casta as Justine Leblanc
- Audrey Tautou as Sarah Anderen
- Daniel Duval as Xavier, l'éditeur
- Lubna Azabal as La mère de Yamine
- Aurore Clément as Madame Pierson
