= The Undivided Five =

Studio album by A Winged Victory for the Sullen
- Released: 1 November 2019
- Studio: Dustin O'Halloran's studio (Berlin); Adam Wiltzie's studio (Brussels); Magyar Rádió Studio 22 (Budapest); Église du Béguinage (Brussels); Ben Frost's studio (Reykjavík); Vox Ton (Berlin)
- Label: Ninja Tune

A Winged Victory for the Sullen chronology
Iris (2016)	The Undivided Five (2019)	Invisible Cities (2021)

Singles from The Undivided Five
- 1. "The Rhythm of a Divided Pair"/"The Haunted Victorian Pencil" Released: 24 September 2019

Professional ratings
Review scores
Source	Rating
Headphone Commute	Positive

The Undivided Five is the third studio album by the ambient music duo A Winged Victory for the Sullen. It was released on 1 November 2019 on Ninja Tune.

== Recording ==
The Undivided Five was produced in eight different recording studios across Europe. A Winged Victory for the Sullen's two members, Dustin O'Halloran and Adam Wiltzie, recorded in their own respective studios in Berlin, Germany and Brussels, Belgium. Orchestral samples were recorded at Studio 22 at Magyar Rádió, Hungary's official international broadcasting station, in Budapest and several parts of the album were rerecorded in Église du Béguinage in Brussels. O'Halloran and Wiltzie recorded additional grand piano at a woodland studio in northern Italy and "experimented with overdubs" at Australian composer Ben Frost's studio in Reykjavík, Iceland. The final mix was conducted at Vox Ton in Berlin, where all previous A Winged Victory for the Sullen releases had been mixed.

== Composition ==
The Undivided Five features 9 tracks, consisting of a mixture of strings, piano and modular synthesizers. In particular, O'Halloran and Wiltzie were influenced by French impressionist composer Claude Debussy, "whose big chords and complicated arrangements inform a lot of their approach" and who the opening track ("Our Lord Debussy") alludes to. Icelandic composer Jóhann Jóhannsson, for whom the duo had completed a remix prior to his death in 2018, was also noted as an influence.

One of O'Halloran and Wiltzie's closest friends died at the beginning of The Undivided Five's recording sessions, at which point O'Halloran also learned he was to become a father for the first time. The album's theme was described as "a profound realisation of life, death, the afterlife, and the spaces in between". Swedish abstract artist Hilma af Klint's spiritist group "The Five" subsequently informed the album's themes and inspired the title. The title is also a reference to the album's songs being "centered around the harmonic perfect fifth", "the five senses" and "the divine interval".

== Release ==
The Undivided Five was released on 1 November 2019 on Ninja Tune. It is A Winged Victory for the Sullen's debut release on the label; the duo were previously signed to Erased Tapes Records in Europe and Kranky in North America. The album will be issued on CD, standard and deluxe-edition 180-gram LP and made available for digital download and streaming. A double A-side digital-only single, "The Rhythm of a Dividing Pair"/"The Haunted Victorian Pencil" was released as The Undivided Five's lead single on 24 September, the day of the album's announcement.

== Track listing ==
No.	Title	Length
1.	"Our Lord Debussy"	9:53
2.	"Sullen Sonata"	5:23
3.	"The Haunted Victorian Pencil"	1:29
4.	"The Slow Descent Has Begun"	4:56
5.	"Aqualung, Motherfucker"	5:20
6.	"A Minor Fifth Is Made of Phantoms"	4:59
7.	"Adios, Florida"	6:30
8.	"The Rhythm of a Dividing Pair"	4:52
9.	"Keep It Dark, Deutschland"	2:36

== Charts ==
Chart (2019)	Peak position
Belgian Albums (Ultratop Flanders)	86
Scottish Albums (OCC)	27

== Release history ==
Region	Date	Format(s)	Label	Catalog
Various	1 November 2019	CD	Ninja Tune	ZENCD255
Various	1 November 2019	LP	Ninja Tune	ZEN255
Various	1 November 2019	Deluxe-edition LP	Ninja Tune	ZEN255X
Various	1 November 2019	Digital download; streaming	Ninja Tune	—
