= Lubomyr Melnyk =

Ukrainian composer and pianist (born 1948)

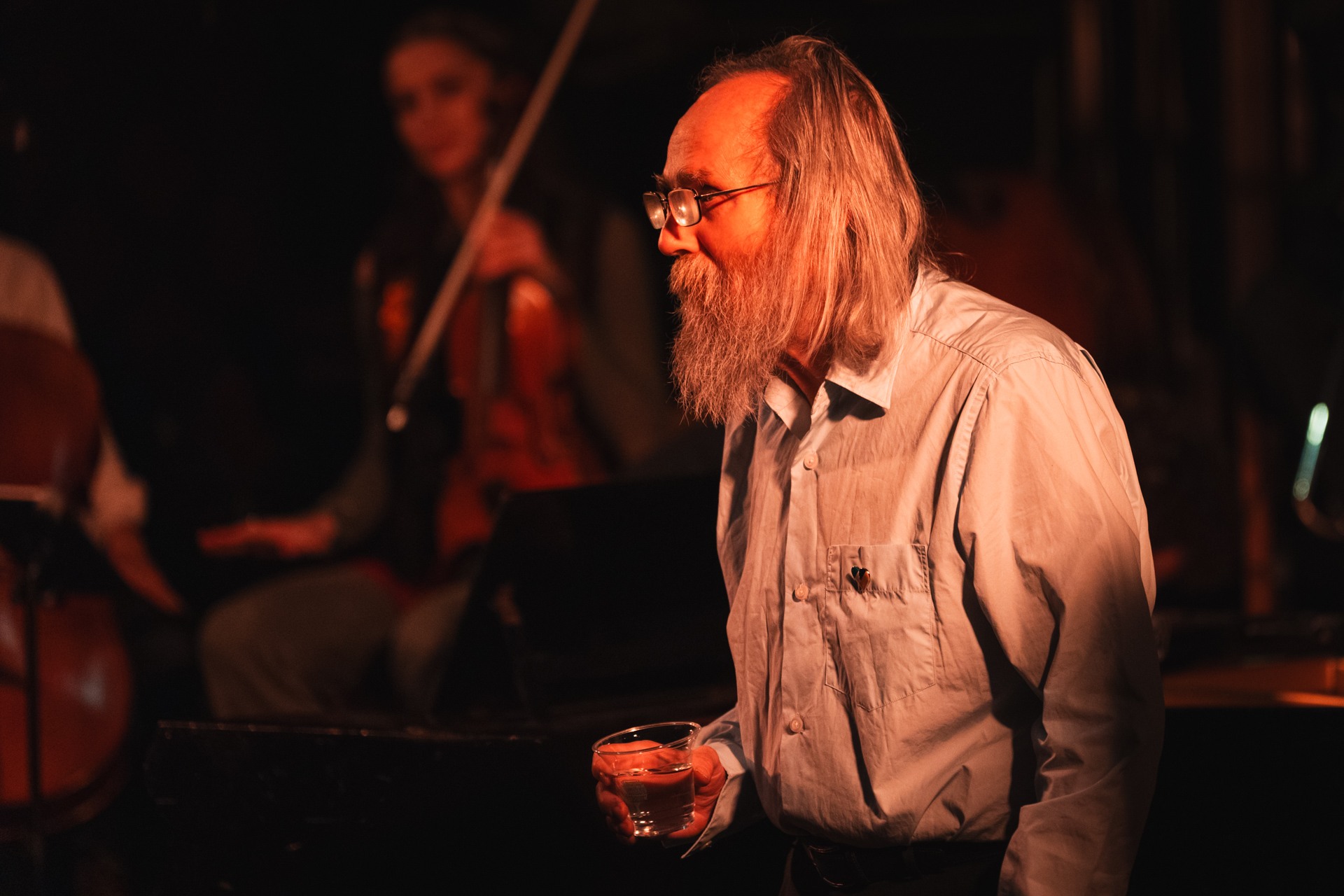
- Lubomyr Melnyk in February 2026
- Born: December 22, 1948 (age 77); Munich, Germany
- Occupations: Composer; pianist
- Website: lubomyr.com

Lubomyr Melnyk (born December 22, 1948) is a composer and pianist of Ukrainian origin.

Melnyk is noted for his 'continuous music', a piano technique featuring extremely rapid notes and complex note-series, usually with the sustain pedal held down to generate harmonic overtones and sympathetic resonances.

"This is a completely-completely different piano universe from everything that has existed before", Melnyk explains.

== Music ==
Melnyk links his piano technique to his national identity.

"This music would not exist at all if I were not Ukrainian. Our distinguishing feature is that we tend to sacrifice ourselves. Ukrainians are self-sacrificing for things that are important to them".

Melnyk often plays rapid sequences, and can play up to 19 notes per second with each hand. These overtones blend or clash according to harmonic changes. Most of his music is for the solo piano, but he has also composed chamber music and orchestral works where he plays the continuous piano and is accompanied by musicians with other instruments, for example: "The End of the World" or "Vocalises and Antiphons". Some pieces are performed for two pianos, where he plays over a recording of himself, for instance "Niche-Nourish-Niche-Xon". Of his technique, he has said:

There's an act of creation. For this act of creation to happen every day the body of the pianist, and not just the fingers, but the entire body has to be transformed. Because in order to make these very small changes and very small decisions that I make when I'm creating music, or when I playing the music, it has to happen at a faster speed of time than any other music. The mind has to control many things. So the decisions happen in another dimension than what the fingers are doing. Part of my mind controls the fingers, part of my mind controls my hand, part of my mind is controlling my entire body, part of my mind is thinking about something else, and part of my mind is combining everything. For the body to be able to reach this enormous universe, which is huge, it has to be changed. This is what continuous music is about.

== Teaching ==
Melnyk offers lessons to a general audience of piano students, and has liked to run workshops at concerts in the past - when possible. Though, few have truly taken interest in studying. Two notable students who are successful pianists in their own right are Ell Kendall and Matthew Thomasson, who perform their own music which is (occasionally) seen to be inspired by Melnyk's technique. Another is Hauschka, who helped Melnykr's music become noticed by the record label Erased Tapes, which he has worked with for many years. He has also worked with Peter Broderick and Nils Frahm. He has expressed fears that his music will not outlive him. In another old interview he commented:

I am yet to find anyone who can interpret my music at a level where I could say they are actually able to play the piece. None of my students are ready but when the time comes, their fingers will obey their minds and I will be able to gauge the success of their interpretation.

Melnyk has also made certain educational recordings and has written exercises for students such as the Meditations and the 22 Circular Etudes. As mentioned in the below section, he wrote a book titled Open Time, which focuses on explaining his notation and surrounding philosophy and spirituality, in relation to the music.

Some of his pieces have individual scores available online, e.g. Cloud Nr. 81 or Barcarolle. There is also a scorebook of six pieces, published by Erased Tapes, wherein scores for Pockets of Light, Butterfly, Parasol, Evertina, Awaiting and The Moving Window may be found.

== Biography ==
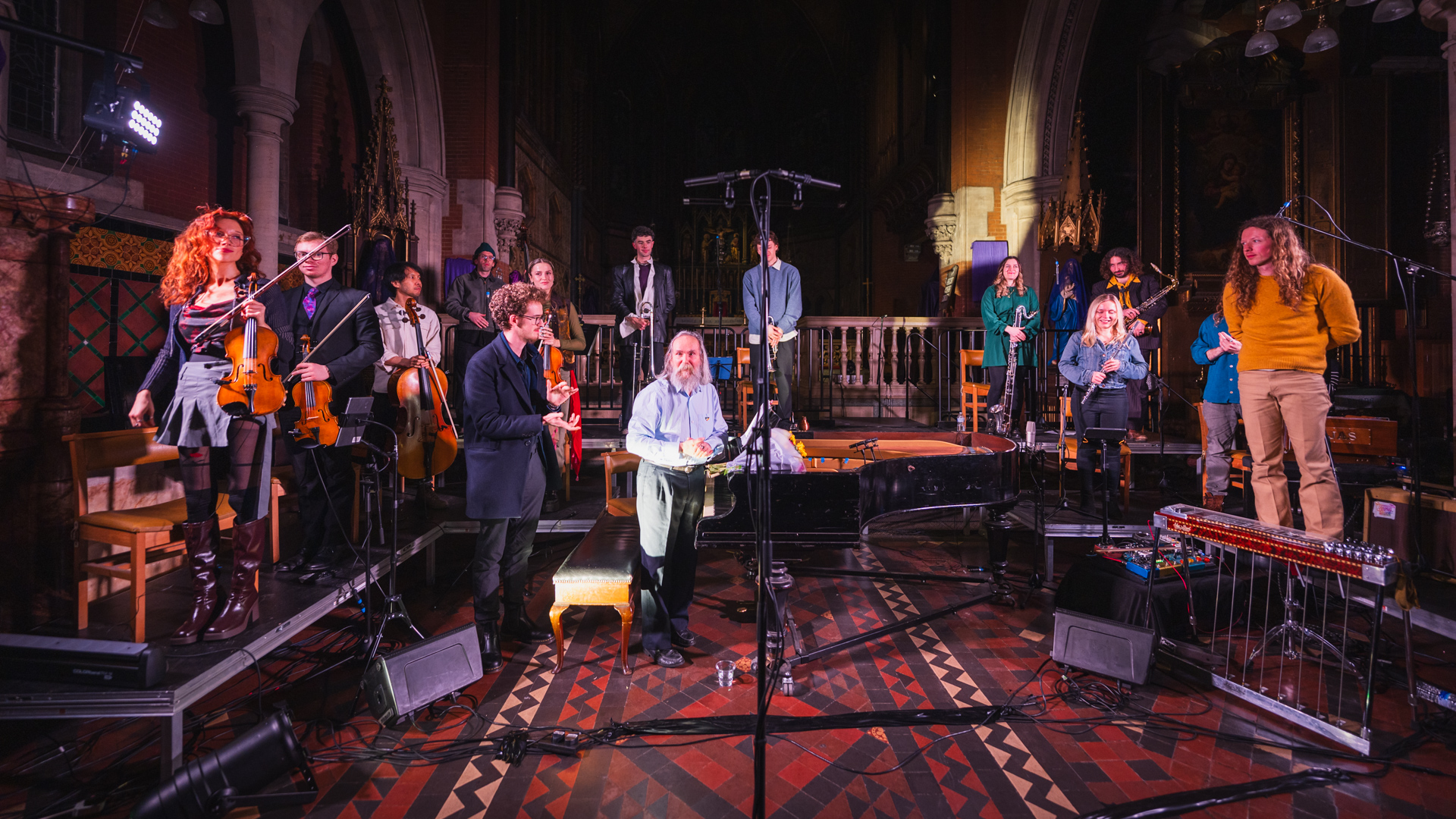
Lubomyr Melnyk and The London Ambient Orchestra in February 2026

Melnyk was born on December 22, 1948, in Munich, Germany, to Ukrainian parents. After emigrating to Canada he received a degree in Latin and Philosophy from St. Paul’s College in Winnipeg. He lived in Paris from 1973 to 1975, supporting himself by playing for modern dance classes, most notably in conjunction with Carolyn Carlson at the Paris Opera. Many of his works were presented in conjunction with modern dance. Through his work with Carlson, he began to create continuous music for piano.

Melnyk has composed over 120 works, mostly for piano solo and double piano, and some for piano with ensemble. To explain the proper physical and mental techniques for his music, Melnyk wrote a treatise, OPEN TIME: The Art of Continuous Music (1981) and 22 Etudes, to teach the fundamental levels of his continuous technique.

In 1985, Melnyk set two world records, documented on film and with full audio, at the Sigtuna Stiftelsen in Sweden. He sustained speeds of over 19.5 notes per second in each hand, and played between 13 and 14 notes per second for one full hour.

== Discography ==
- KMH: Piano Music in the Continuous Mode (1979)
- The Lund - St. Petri Symphony (1983)
- Concert-Requiem (1983)
- Poslaniye: to the Living, to the Dead, and to Those Yet Unborn (1983)
- The Stone Knight (1983)
- The Song of Galadriel (1985)
- Remnants of Man / The Fountain (1985)
- Wave-Lox (1985)
- The Voice Of Trees (1985)
- NICHE / NOURISH / NICHE-XONs (1988)
- A Portrait Of Petlura On The Day He Was Killed {Lyrrest} (1989)
- It Was Revealed Unto Us That Man Is The Centre Of The Universe (1993)
- Swallows (1994)
- Vocalizes and Antiphons (1991-1994)
- Beyond Romance (2010)
- The Self-Luminous Way (2011)
- Windmills (2013)
- Corollaries (2013) (Erased Tapes Records)
- Three Solo Pieces (2013)
- Evertina (2014) (Erased Tapes Records)
- Rivers and Streams (2015) (Erased Tapes Records)
- illirion (2016) (Sony Classical Records / Sounds of Subterrania )
- The Dreamers Ever Leave You - The Lauren Harris Ballet Music (2018) (Audio Sushi)
- Fallen Trees (2018) (Erased Tapes Records)

== Sources ==
- Encyclopedia of Music in Canada: "Melnyk, Lubomyr"
- Schulman, Michael, 'Despite all his problems, Lubomyr Melnyk labours on,' Canadian Composer, 117, January 1977
- Prokosh, Kevin, 'Piano attacked in samurai style,' Winnipeg Free Press, 10 January 1997
- Eddins, Stephen, 'A major feat of virtuosity', AllMusic, 2007
- Powell, Mike, 'Minimalism at its most lush, ornate, and taxing', Pitchfork, 23 August 2007
- Fifteen Questions with Lubomyr Melnyk, 15 questions | Interview | Lubomyr Melnyk | Musical, mystical and multidimensional
- Erased Tapes Records: Lubomyr Melnyk - Artists
