= Douglas Dare =

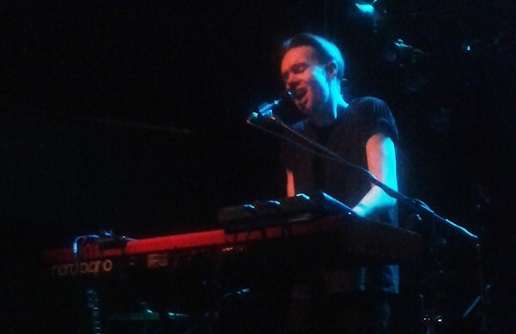
- Douglas Dare in Poznań, 22 February 2015

Background information
- Born: Douglas Samuel Charles Dare; 6 June 1990 (age 35)
- Origin: Bridport, Dorset, England
- Instruments: Piano
- Labels: Erased Tapes
- Website: douglasdare.com

Douglas Samuel Charles Dare (born 6 June 1990) is an English singer-songwriter and pianist based in London.

== Biography ==
Dare is from Bridport in Dorset. He is the son of a piano teacher and studied music at the Liverpool Institute for Performing Arts, where he performed with Paul McCartney. He is gay and has a drag persona under the name of Visa Reasons.

Dare released his debut EP, Seven Hours on Erased Tapes in 2013 and toured Europe with label mate Ólafur Arnalds. He released his debut album Whelm on May 12, 2014, on Erased Tapes, and supported label mate Nils Frahm on his North American Tour. In October 2016, he released his second album Aforger on Erased Tapes.

== Discography ==
=== Extended plays ===
#	EP Name	EP Info	Tracklisting
1st	Seven Hours EP	Released Date: 30 September 2013; Genres: Art Pop, Chamber Pop; Label: Erased Tapes	1. "Seven Hours"; 2. "Scars"; 3. "Lungful"; 4. "Flames"
2nd	Caroline / If Only EP	Released Date: 22 September 2014; Genres: Art Pop, Chamber Pop; Label: Erased Tapes	1. "Caroline"; 2. "If I Knew I Were Alive"; 3. "Swim" (Rival Consoles Remix); 4. "Nile" (Throwing Snow Remix)

=== Studio albums ===
#	Album name	Album info	Tracklisting
1st	Whelm	Released Date: 12 May 2014; Genres: Art Pop, Chamber Pop; Label: Erased Tapes	1. "Clockwork"; 2. "Nile"; 3. "Repeat"; 4. "Caroline"; 5. "Whelm"; 6. "Unset"; 7. "Lungful"; 8. "Whitewash"; 9. "Swim"; 10. "London's Rose"
2nd	Aforger	Released Date: 14 October 2016; Genres: Art Pop, Chamber Pop; Label: Erased Tapes	1. "Doublethink"; 2. "Greenhouse"; 3. "Oh Father"; 4. "New York"; 5. "The Edge"; 6. "Binary"; 7. "Stranger"; 8. "Venus"; 9. "Thinking Of Him"; 10. "Rex"
3rd	Milkteeth	Released Date: 21 February 2020; Genres: Art Pop, Chamber Pop; Label: Erased Tapes	1. "I Am Free"; 2. "Red Arrows"; 3. "Heavenly Bodies"; 4. "The Piano Room"; 5. "Silly Games"; 6. "The Joy in Sarah's Eyes"; 7. "The Stairwell"; 8. "Wherever You Are"; 9. "The Window"; 10. "The Playground"; 11. "Run"
4th	Omni	Released Date: 13 May 2024; Genres: Art Pop, Chamber Pop; Label: Erased Tapes	1. "Three Roads"; 2. "Mouth To Mouth" featuring – Rival Consoles; 3. "Absentia"; 4. "Sailor"; 5. "Omni"; 6. "Teach Me"; 7. "No Island Is A Man"; 8. "Painter"; 9. "8w9zeros" 10. "The Stream"

== Other sources ==
- Seven Hours EP Review by Drowned In Sound
- Seven Hours EP Review by The Line of Best Fit
- Seven Hours EP Review by Bearded Magazine
- EP track Lungful premiere on Mary Anne Hobbs BBC6 Music Show
