= The Stars at Saint Andrea =

Studio album by Devics
- Released: February 4, 2003
- Length: 43:37
- Label: Bella Union

Professional ratings
Review scores
Source	Rating
AllMusic	4/5 stars
BBC Online	(favourable)
The Guardian	2/5 stars

The Stars at Saint Andrea is an album by Devics, released in 2003 on the Bella Union label. The album title refers to the Italian town of Saint Andrea, where the album was written and recorded.

== Track listing ==
1. "Red Morning" - 4:42
2. "Don't Take It Away" - 4:34
3. "In Your Room" - 4:59
4. "My True Love" - 5:36
5. "All Your Beautiful Trees" - 4:35
6. "The End and the Beginning" - 4:35
7. "Safer Shores" - 4:44
8. "Connected by a String" - 3:45
9. "Stretch Out Your Arms" - 4:09
10. "Ending" - 1:58
