= Push the Heart =

Studio album by Devics
- Released: March 7, 2006
- Genre: Rock
- Length: 43:34
- Label: Bella Union

Devics chronology
Distant Radio (2005)	Push the Heart (2006)

Professional ratings
Aggregate scores
Source	Rating
Metacritic	67/100
Review scores
Source	Rating
Allmusic	link
Drowned In Sound	8/10
Sputnikmusic	3.5/5 stars
PopMatters	7/10

Push the Heart is the fourth full-length album by American indie-rock band Devics. It was released in March 2006 under Bella Union Records.

== Track listing ==
No.	Title	Length
1.	"Lie to Me"	3:04
2.	"A Secret Message to You"	4:58
3.	"Salty Seas"	4:13
4.	"Song for a Sleeping Girl"	4:36
5.	"Distant Radio"	4:54
6.	"Just One Breath"	3:55
7.	"Moments"	4:44
8.	"If We Cannot See"	5:11
9.	"City Lights"	3:57
10.	"Come Up"	4:01
