= Kiasmos =

Faroese-Icelandic musical duo

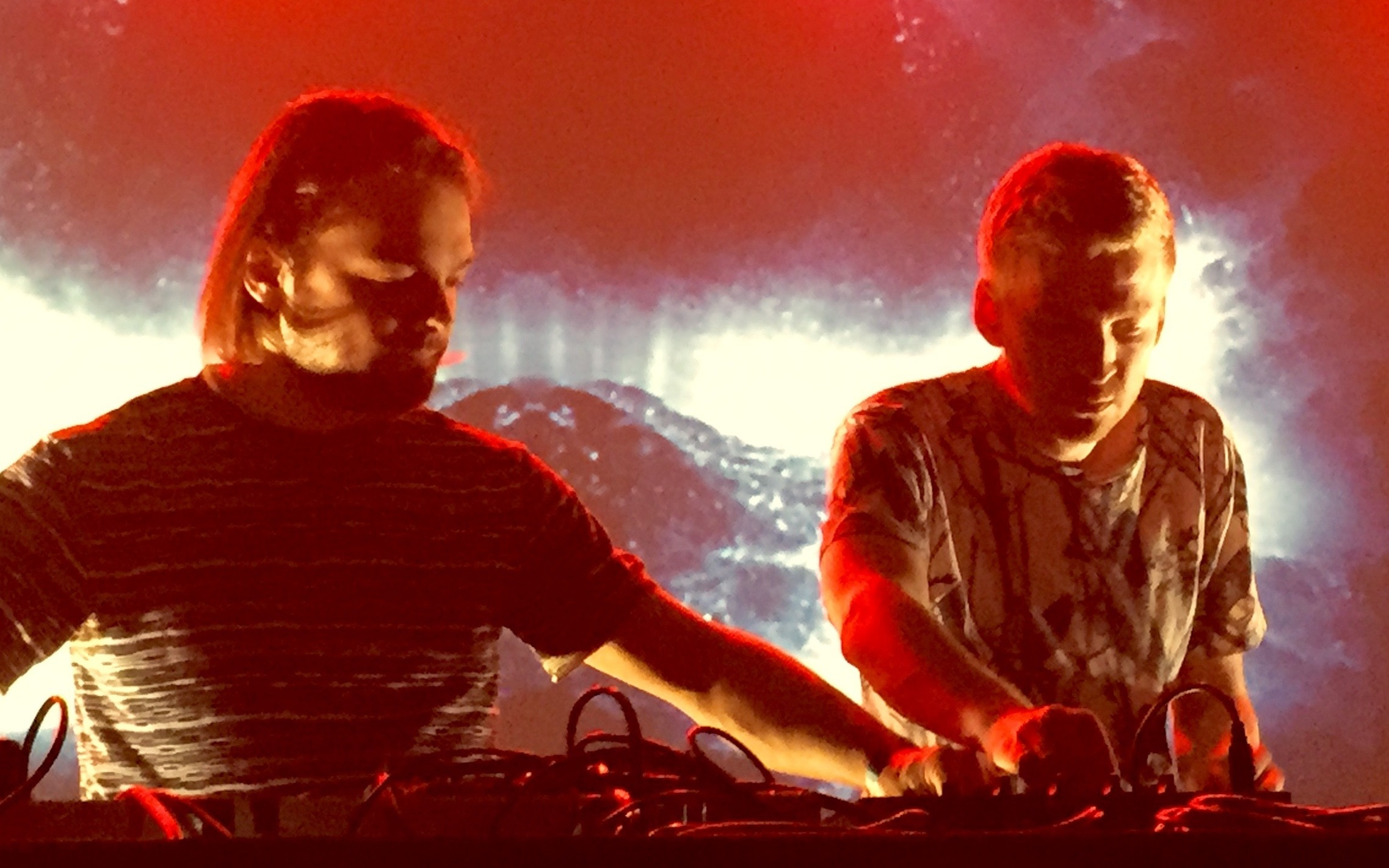
- Kiasmos performing at The Independent San Francisco, 2 June 2015

Background information
- Origin: Iceland
- Genres: Electronica; electropop; IDM; techno; minimal techno; ambient
- Years active: 2009–present
- Label: Erased Tapes
- Members: Ólafur Arnalds; Janus Rasmussen
- Website: www.kiasmos.is

Kiasmos is a Faroese-Icelandic minimal, experimental techno duo, composed of Ólafur Arnalds and Janus Rasmussen. They started in 2009 and released their first extended play, Thrown, in 2012 and their album Kiasmos in 2014.

== History ==
In 2009, the duo started with the 65/Milo, a split 12"' release, together with record-label colleague Rival Consoles. In 2014, they released their debut LP, Kiasmos, on Erased Tapes Records Ltd.

Kiasmos released their fourth EP, Blurred, in 2017, which PopMatters described as "one of the most emotionally engaging electronic releases of the year . . . It is an intricate yet unforced and natural sounding set of songs with every song allowed room to bloom gradually."

== Members ==
Ólafur Arnalds and Janus Rasmussen worked together when Ólafur was a sound engineer for Rasmussen's Bloodgroup project.

Ólafur is a multi-instrumentalist and producer from Mosfellsbær, Iceland. His work is characterized by strings and piano, with loops and edgy beats as a fusion of ambient/electronic and pop.

Rasmussen, from the Faroe Islands, is a member of Bloodgroup. Rasmussen also worked along with other artists such as Guðrið Hansdóttir in the band Byrta.

== Discography ==
- Thrown (2012 Erased Tapes EP)
- Kiasmos (2014 Erased Tapes)
- Looped (2015 Erased Tapes EP)
- Swept (2015 Erased Tapes EP)
- Blurred (2017 Erased Tapes EP)
- II (2024 Erased Tapes)
