= Dustin O'Halloran =

American pianist and composer

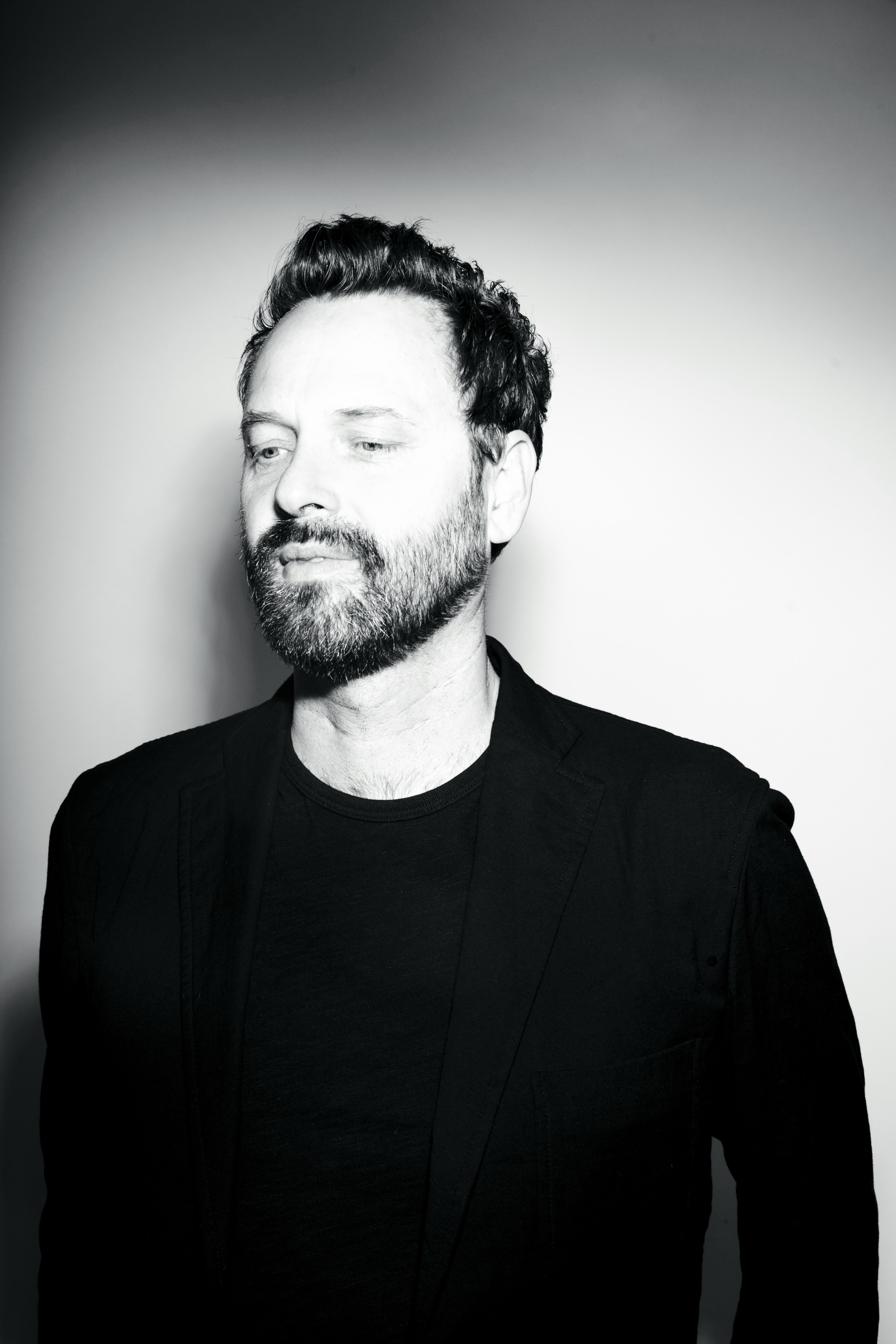

Background information
- Born: September 8, 1971 (age 55); Phoenix, Arizona
- Origin: Los Angeles, California
- Occupations: Pianist, composer
- Years active: 1994–present
- Label: Deutsche Grammophon
- Website: dustinohalloran.com

Dustin O'Halloran (born September 8, 1971) is an American composer and pianist. Aside from releasing music as a recording artist, O'Halloran is a film and TV composer, as well as one half of ambient act A Winged Victory for the Sullen.

== Early life ==
O'Halloran was born in Phoenix, Arizona, and spent most of his childhood in Hawaii and Los Angeles. While studying art at Santa Monica College, he met singer Sara Lov, with whom he founded indie rock band Dévics in 1998. When the group signed with Bella Union in 2001, they relocated to Romagna, Italy, where O'Halloran lived for several years.

== Career ==
=== Solo work ===
In 2004, O'Halloran released his first record as a solo artist, Piano Solos. He has since released five more solo records, including Lumiere (2011), which featured contributions by Peter Broderick and Adam Wiltzie (Stars of the Lid), and was mixed by Jóhann Jóhannsson.

In 2019, O'Halloran signed with Deutsche Grammophon and released his first EP on the label, entitled Sundoor. It features a 20-minute piece, "196 Hz," adapted from a 2017 site-specific composition for cross-disciplinary American artist Slater Bradley’s Sundoor at World’s End held at the Church of Mary Magdalene (La Maddalena) in Venice during the 57th Biennale. Slater Bradley's artwork would later become the cover of O'Halloran's 2024 record 1 0 0 1, also released on Deutsche Grammophon.

=== A Winged Victory For The Sullen ===
With A Winged Victory for the Sullen, his collaboration with Adam Wiltzie, O'Halloran has released four studio albums: A Winged Victory for the Sullen (2011), Atomos (2014), The Undivided Five (2019), and Invisible Cities (2021). The second was also the original score for the identically titled dance piece by choreographer Wayne McGregor and his company Wayne McGregor Random Dance.

In 2015, AWVFTS were invited to perform at the Royal Albert Hall in London as part of the BBC Proms. The duo scored their first film together in 2016, entitled In the Shadow of Iris by French director Jalil Lespert.

In addition to their studio outputs, they wrote the soundtrack for the 2016 film Iris.

In 2019, A Winged Victory for the Sullen signed with UK-based indie label Ninja Tune.

=== Film score works ===
Since the release of Piano Solos Volumes 1 and 2 in 2004 and 2006, O'Halloran has gone on to score a number of films and TV shows. These include Sofia Coppola's 2006 film Marie Antoinette, and Drake Doremus’ Like Crazy (2011), which won the Grand Jury Prize at Sundance. In 2014, O’Halloran worked on Indian drama Umrika, which won the Audience Award at Sundance, and gave him his first opportunity to compose for a full string orchestra.

In the same year he was also asked to provide the music for Transparent, the acclaimed TV series created by Joey Soloway for Amazon Studios.

O'Halloran was awarded the Primetime Emmy Award for Outstanding Original Main Title Theme Music for his original theme for Transparent in 2015.

In 2016, he collaborated with Hauschka (Volker Bertelmann) on the score for the Oscar-nominated film Lion. The score of the film was nominated for many major awards including the Academy Awards, Golden Globes, BAFTAs and Critics’ Choice Awards. He has since collaborated with Bertelmann on a number of other scores, including Ammonite (2020).

== Personal life ==
Dustin O'Halloran divides his time between Reykjavík and Los Angeles.

== Discography ==
=== Solo albums ===
Year	Album	Label
2004	Piano Solos	Splinter
2006	Piano Solos Vol. 2	Filter/Splinter
2010	Vorleben	Sonic Pieces
2011	Lumiere	Fat Cat
2017	3 Movements (EP)	1631 Recordings
2019	Sundoor (EP)	Deutsche Grammophon
2021	Silfur	Deutsche Grammophon
2024	1 0 0 1	Deutsche Grammophon

=== Soundtrack albums ===
- Marie Antoinette (Verve Forecast/Polydor, 2006)
- An American Affair (Splinter, 2009)
- Now Is Good (Polydor, 2012)
- Like Crazy (Relativity Music, 2012)
- The Beauty Inside (Splinter, 2013)
- Breathe In (Milan Records, 2013)
- Umrika (Splinter, 2015)
- Iris (Erased Tapes, 2016) (as A Winged Victory For The Sullen)
- Lion (Sony Music, 2016) (with Hauschka)
- Save Me (Sky, 2018)
- Puzzle (Sony Music, 2018)
- The Hate U Give (Milan Records, 2018) (with Volker Bertelmann)
- The Art of Racing in the Rain (Hollywood Records, 2019) (with Volker Bertelmann)
- Save Me Too (SATV/Save Me Too, 2020)
- A Christmas Carol (Hollywood Records, 2020) (with Volker Bertelmann)
- The Old Guard (Lakeshore Music, 2020) (with Volker Bertelmann)
- Ammonite (Milan Records, 2020) (with Volker Bertelmann)
- Bridget Jones: Mad About the Boy (Backlot Music, 2025)
- Eleanor the Great (Milan Records, 2025)

=== With Devics ===
- If You Forget Me (Bella Union, 1998 – writer, co-producer)
- My Beautiful Sinking Ship (Bella Union, 2001 – writer, co-producer)
- The Stars at St. Andrea (Bella Union, 2003 – writer, producer)
- Push the Heart (Filter, 2006 – writer, producer)

=== With A Winged Victory for the Sullen ===
- A Winged Victory for the Sullen (Kranky, 2011 – Arranger, Composer, Engineer, Main Personnel, Score)
- Atomos (Kranky, 2014 – Arranger, Composer, Engineer, Primary Artist, Score)
- Iris (Erased Tapes, 2016)
- God's Own Country (2017)
- The Undivided Five (Ninja Tune, 2019)
- Invisible Cities (2021)

=== Other collaborations ===
- With Katy Perry: "Into Me You See" from Witness.

== Filmography ==
Year	Title	Director	Credits	Notes
2006	Marie Antoinette	Sofia Coppola	Composer	
2007	Remember the Daze	Jess Manafort	Composer	
2008	An American Affair	William Olsson	Composer	
2010	Want to See Something?	Tomas Jonsgården	Composer	Short
2011	Like Crazy	Drake Doremus	Composer	
2012	The Other Dream Team	Marius A. Markevicius	Composer	Documentary
2012	The Beauty Inside	Drake Doremus	Composer	TV Mini-Series
2012	Now Is Good	Ol Parker	Composer	
2013	Breathe In	Drake Doremus	Composer	
2013	Eclipse	Linda Arkelian, David Cooper	Composer	Short
2014	Posthumous	Lulu Wang	Composer	
2014–2017	Transparent	Jill Soloway (creator)	Composer	TV series
2015	Deliá	Thomas Scott Stanton	Composer	Short
2015	Umrika	Prashant Nair	Composer	
2015	American Masters	Susan Lacy	Composer	TV series documentary
2015	This Is Me	Rhys Ernst	Composer	TV mini-series documentary
2015	Equals	Drake Doremus	Composer	
2016	I Love Dick	Sarah Gubbins, Jill Soloway (creators)	Composer	TV series
2016	Lion	Garth Davis	Composer	with Volker Bertelmann
2016	Queimafobia	Daniel Sánchez Arévalo	Composer	Short
2016	In the Shadow of Iris	Jalil Lespert	Composer	
2017	God's Own Country	Francis Lee	Composer	
2018	The Current War	Alfonso Gomez-Rejon	Composer	With Hauschka
2018	Save Me	Nick Murphy	Composer	with Bryan Senti
2018	Puzzle	Marc Turtletaub	Composer	
2018	The Hate U Give	George Tillman Jr.	Composer	
2019	The Art of Racing in the Rain	Simon Curtis	Composer	with Volker Bertelmann
2019	A Christmas Carol	Nick Murphy	Composer	with Volker Bertelmann
2020	For Life	Hank Steinberg	Composer	TV series
2020	Save Me Too	Nick Murphy	Composer	with Bryan Senti
2020	The Old Guard	Gina Prince-Bythewood	Composer	with Volker Bertelmann
2020	Ammonite	Francis Lee	Composer	with Volker Bertelmann
2022	The Essex Serpent	Clio Barnard	Composer	with Herdís Stefánsdóttir
2025	Bridget Jones: Mad About the Boy	Michael Morris	Composer	
2025	Eleanor the Great	Scarlett Johansson	Composer	

== Awards and nominations ==
Year	Award	Nomination	Title	Result	Notes
2014	HMMA Award	Main Title - TV Show / Digital Series	Transparent	Nominated	
2015	Primetime Emmy Award	Outstanding Main Title Theme Music	Transparent	Won	
2016	Critics’ Choice Awards	Best Score	Lion (2016)	Nominated	Shared with: Volker Bertelmann
2016	PFCS Award	Best Original Score	Lion (2016)	Nominated	Shared with: Volker Bertelmann
2016	HMMA Award	Best Original Score - Feature Film	Lion (2016)	Nominated	Shared with: Volker Bertelmann
2017	GFCA Award	Best Original Score	Lion (2016)	Nominated	Shared with: Volker Bertelmann
2017	BAFTA Film Award	Original Music	Lion (2016)	Nominated	Shared with: Volker Bertelmann
2017	Academy Award	Best Original Score	Lion (2016)	Nominated	Shared with: Volker Bertelmann
2017	Golden Globe	Best Original Score	Lion (2016)	Nominated	Shared with: Volker Bertelmann
