= KMH: Piano Music in the Continuous Mode =

- Original LP cover art

Studio album by Lubomyr Melnyk
- Released: 1978, 2007
- Recorded: 1978
- Genre: Classical music, Minimalist music, Avant-Garde music
- Length: 50:10
- Label: Music Gallery Editions, Bandura Records, Unseen Worlds

Lubomyr Melnyk chronology
KMH: Piano Music in the Continuous Mode (1978)	The Lund - St. Petri Symphony (1981)

Re-release Cover
- Cover art for the 2007 Unseen Worlds re-release

KMH: Piano Music in the Continuous Mode is the debut album by the pianist Lubomyr Melnyk. It was originally released in 1978 and then re-released by Unseen Worlds in 2007.

== Critical reception ==
Professional ratings
Review scores
Source	Rating
AllMusic	5/5 stars
Pitchfork	(7.8/10)

In the late 1980s, The Village Voice named KMH as one of the "10 albums you can't live without".

In his review of the 2007 re-release, Stephen Eddins (Allmusic) praised Melnyk's performance, saying that it "boggles the imagination" and that it would appeal to "fans of minimalism and maverick experimentalism with an immensely attractive sound." Mike Powell (Pitchfork) described the music as "minimalism at its most lush, ornate, and taxing" and compared it to works by La Monte Young and Erik Satie.

== Track listing ==
All music is composed by Lubomyr Melnyk.

LP track listing
No.	Title	Length
1.	"KMH"	24:50
2.	"KMH"	25:50
Total length:		50:10

CD track listing
No.	Title	Length
1.	"KMH Pt. 1"	11:45
2.	"KMH Pt. 2"	9:03
3.	"KMH Pt. 3"	10:29
4.	"KMH Pt. 4"	11:05
5.	"KMH Pt. 5"	7:52
Total length:		50:10
