= Rival Consoles =

British electronic musician (born 1985)

- Also known as: Aparatec
- Born: Ryan Lee West; 10 November 1985 (age 40); Leicester, England
- Origin: London, England
- Genre: Electronic
- Occupations: Musician; composer; producer
- Years active: 2007–present
- Label: Erased Tapes
- Website: www.rivalconsoles.net

Ryan Lee West (born 10 November 1985), known by his stage name Rival Consoles, is a British electronic musician, living in London. All of his albums and EPs have been released by Erased Tapes Records.

== Biography ==
West was born in Leicester. He learned to play guitar in his youth, but later switched to electronic production, studying music technology at De Montfort University. He initially used the stage name Aparatec, releasing an EP of material under that name in 2007. His first release as Rival Consoles was issued later in 2007 by Erased Tapes Records, which has released all of his albums and EPs.

West has remixed tracks by Jon Hopkins, Vessels, Ólafur Arnalds, Nils Frahm, Max Cooper, Noisia, Sasha and Toydrum among others.

Rival Consoles' style is a combination of ambient, shoegaze, minimal techno and cinematic—often created with analogue synths, pedals and degraded processes. Pitchfork described Rival Consoles' sound as "high-brow, avant-garde electronic music in the vein of Jon Hopkins and Nils Frahm".

West has also scored work for contemporary dance such as Alexander Whitley's Overflow and has scored an episode of Netflix's Black Mirror ("Striking Vipers"). His track "Recovery" was used in a 2020 television commercial for Blue Dragon foods. Kid Velo was also used in adverts for William Hill Vegas between 2012 and 2014.

West released his ninth studio album, Landscape from Memory, on 4 July 2025.

== Discography ==
=== Studio albums ===
==== Solo ====
- IO (2009, Erased Tapes)
- Kid Velo (2011, Erased Tapes)
- Howl (2015, Erased Tapes)
- Night Melody (2016, Erased Tapes) – mini-album
- Persona (2018, Erased Tapes)
- Articulation (2020, Erased Tapes)
- Overflow (2021, Erased Tapes)
- Now Is (2022, Erased Tapes)
- Landscape from Memory (2025, Erased Tapes)

==== Game score ====
- MindsEye (2025, Erased Tapes)

==== With other musicians ====
- 65/Milo (2009, with Kiasmos)

=== EPs ===
- Vemeer (2007, Erased Tapes, as Aparatec)
- The Decadent (2007, Erased Tapes)
- Helvetica (2009, Erased Tapes)
- Odyssey (2014, Erased Tapes)
- Sonne (2015, Erased Tapes)

=== Remixes ===
- Four – Olafur Arnalds, Nils Frahm – Rival Consoles Remix (2016)
- Distant Light – Max Cooper – Rival Consoles Remix (2017)
- Cassette sessions E – Sasha – Rival Consoles Remix (2020)
- The Approach – Noisia – Rival Consoles Remix (2017)
- Jesus Song – Toydrum – Rival Consoles Remix (2017)
- Weightless – Neil Cowley Trio – Rival Consoles Remix (2018)
- Swim – Douglas Dare – Rival Consoles Remix (2014)
- Birds That Fly – Kidnap – Rival Consoles Remix
- In Mindibu – Stavroz – Rival Consoles Remix
- Snow Day – Catching Flies – Rival Consoles Remix
- Revolution – Tinlicker – Rival Consoles Remix (2024)
- Ghosts Again – Depeche Mode – Rival Consoles Remix (2023)
