= Howl (Rival Consoles album) =

Studio album by Rival Consoles
- Released: 16 October 2015
- Genre: Electronic
- Length: 41:37
- Label: Erased Tapes
- Producer: Ryan Lee West

Rival Consoles chronology
Kid Velo (2011)	Howl (2015)	Night Melody (2016)

Professional ratings
Aggregate scores
Source	Rating
AnyDecentMusic?	7.3/10
Metacritic	80/100
Review scores
Source	Rating
The 405	8/10
AllMusic	4/5 stars
Crack Magazine	7/10
Exclaim!	9/10
Loud and Quiet	8/10
MusicOMH	4/5 stars
Pitchfork	7.7/10
PopMatters	8/10
The Skinny	3/5 stars
Resident Advisor	3/5 stars

Howl is the third studio album by British electronic musician Ryan Lee West, performed under his stage name Rival Consoles. It was released on 16 October 2015, by Erased Tapes Records.

== Critical reception ==
Howl was met with "generally favorable" reviews from critics. At Metacritic, which assigns a weighted average rating out of 100 to reviews from mainstream publications, this release received an average score of 80 based on 9 reviews. Aggregator Album of the Year gave the release a 75 out of 100 based on a critical consensus of 12 reviews.

Daryl Keating of Exclaim! wrote: "Howl is a well-crafted structure, built on the foundation laid by its predecessors. It's certainly the pinnacle of West's career so far, and up there for electronic album highlight of year." He also explained: "Every note, beat and chord progression is chosen carefully and played with purpose in order to draw genuine feeling out of these cold electronics. The result is a vast, thoughtful record that leaves a deep impression in its wake Reef Younis of Loud and Quiet explained: "Textural and tempered, it's a third album that has more in common with Jon Hopkins and James Holden's droning electronica but there's still plenty in play for 'Howl' to stand in the exalted ambient company of Erased Tapes labelmates like Nils Frahm and Ólafur Arnalds."

=== Accolades ===
Accolades for Howl
Publication	Accolade	Rank
Exclaim!	Top 10 Electronic Albums of 2015	10
Loud and Quiet	Top 40 Albums of 2015	25
XLR8R	Best of 2018	15

== Track listing ==
Howl track listing
No.	Title	Writer(s)	Length
1.	"Howl"	Ryan Lee West	6:02
2.	"Ghosting"	Ryan Lee West	4:29
3.	"Afterglow"	Ryan Lee West	3:38
4.	"Pre"	Ryan Lee West	5:14
5.	"Walls"	Ryan Lee West	4:18
6.	"Low"	Ryan Lee West	4:20
7.	"3 Laments"	Ryan Lee West	2:05
8.	"Morning Vox"	Ryan Lee West	5:06
9.	"Looming"	Ryan Lee West	6:25

== Personnel ==
Musicians

- Ryan Lee West – primary artist, producer
- Peter Gregson – cello
- Fabian Prynn – drums

Production

- Naweed – mastering
