= Francesco Donadello =

Italian music producer

Francesco Donadello is an Italian music producer and recording, mixing, and mastering engineer based in Berlin, Germany. He is a Grammy and Emmy Award winner, known for his work on projects including the soundtrack for the television series Chernobyl and the main title theme for Transparent.

== Early life ==
Donadello began playing drums at the age of nine and started recording demos using a four-track cassette machine as a teenager.

== Career ==
Donadello ran a studio in Bologna, Italy for several years and toured with his band before transitioning into full-time recording and engineering work. After relocating to Berlin, Germany in 2012, Donadello founded the Vox-Ton Recording Studio in 2013.

Donadello has also done significant audio engineering work for Adam Wiltzie and his ambient bands Stars of the Lid and A Winged Victory for the Sullen. Donadello mixed Moderat's II (2013).

Donadello engineered several acclaimed film scores, including Jóhann Jóhannsson's work on Prisoners (2013), Sicario (2015), and Arrival (2016), Colin Stetson's score for Ari Aster's Hereditary (2018), and Hildur Guðnadóttir's Academy Award-winning score for Joker (2019).

== Awards ==
| Year | Award | Nomination | Title | Result | Notes | Ref. |
|---|---|---|---|---|---|---|
| 2015 | Primetime Emmy Award | Outstanding Main Title Theme Music | Transparent | Won | | |
| 2020 | Grammy Award | Best Score Soundtrack for Visual Media | Chernobyl | Won | With Simon Goffa and Antonio Pulli | |
