= Sara Lov =

American singer and songwriter (born 1970)

Sara Lov is an American singer and songwriter.

== Early life ==
Lov was born in Hawaii in 1971 and later was raised by her mother in Los Angeles after the divorce of her parents. At the age of four she was kidnapped by her father, who was in the midst of a custody battle, and she was taken to Israel. Sara Lov lived there with an international fugitive from justice until a decade later when an uncle brought about her repatriation to the United States.

== Career ==
In 1993 Lov formed the dream pop duo Devics alongside pianist Dustin O'Halloran. In 2001, the group signed with Bella Union, a U.K.-based record label run by Cocteau Twins' Simon Raymonde, and moved to Italy. Lov later decided to pursue a solo career and partnered with producer Zac Rae on a full-length album. In order to complete the work on the record, Lov relocated back to the Los Angeles area; she also toured with Sea Wolf and performed at a number of L.A. venues.

Lov's song, "Connected by a String," was inspired by events in her life. "Everywhere [her father] went, he’d leave a path of destruction," Lov said, "but music was my sanity. It was the thing I could turn to to escape." Sara came back to America when she was older, but her sister stayed behind. Thus the line, "never mind the bombs in Tel Aviv" (which is a city in Israel) and Sara's statement that, "I will not go back there, and she will never leave."

Her debut The Young Eyes EP was released January 20, 2009 through Nettwerk. The EP contains two cover songs: "My Body Is A Cage" by Arcade Fire, and "Timebomb" by Beck. A full-length album, Seasoned Eyes Were Beaming was released in March 2009, also through Nettwerk. Her single "Fountain" was featured during the climax of a scene in Fox's Bones TV series.

Lov's LP I Already Love You was released February 15, 2010 on her own label Splinter Records. Her 2015 album Some Kind of Champion was self-released after a successful PledgeMusic campaign.

== Discography ==
=== Albums ===
- Seasoned Eyes were Beaming (2009)
- I Already Love You (2011)
- Some Kind of Champion (2015)

=== Extended plays ===
- The Young Eyes EP (2009)

=== Singles ===
- "Three Songs" (2008)
- "All Out of Love" (2010)
- "Well I wonder" (2011) Please, Please, Please: a tribute to The Smiths
