= Chaos (2000 film) =

- Film poster

Japanese name
- Kanji: カオス
Transcriptions
- Revised Hepburn: Kaosu
- Directed by: Hideo Nakata
- Written by: Hisashi Saitō
- Produced by: Satoshi Kanno; Kimio Hara
- Starring: Miki Nakatani; Masato Hagiwara; Ken Mitsuishi; Jun Kunimura
- Cinematography: Tokushō Kikumura
- Edited by: Jun'ichi Kikuchi
- Music by: Kenji Kawai
- Distributed by: Taki Corporation; Suncent CinemaWorks
- Release date: October 21, 2000 (Japan)
- Running time: 104 minutes
- Country: Japan
- Language: Japanese

Chaos (Japanese: カオス, Hepburn: Kaosu) is a 2000 Japanese mystery-thriller film, directed by Hideo Nakata. It stars Miki Nakatani and Masato Hagiwara. It is based on Shōgo Utano's novel Sarawaretai Onna (Japanese: さらわれたい女, Hepburn: lit. The Woman Who Wants to Be Kidnapped).

== Plot synopsis ==
A handyman (Masato Hagiwara) gets involved in a kidnapping scheme with the wife of a wealthy businessman. She lets herself be tied up and confined in his house while he sends the ransom demand. When he returns home that night, however, he finds her lying dead on the floor. In a panic, he buries her body deep in the woods and tries to return to his ordinary life. One day, he thinks he spots her walking down the street. Is his mind playing tricks on him, or has she somehow returned from the grave?

== Cast ==
- Masato Hagiwara - Handyman/Gorō Kuroda
- Miki Nakatani - Satomi Tsushima
- Ken Mitsuishi - Takayuki Komiyama
- Jun Kunimura - Police Inspector Hamaguchi

== Critical reception ==
The film received favourable reviews, garnering a 73% rating on Rotten Tomatoes, certifying it as "fresh". and a 63 out of 100 grade on Metacritic, which means "generally favorable reviews".

== Remakes ==
The film was remade loosely in India as Woodstock Villa (2008), and in France as Iris (2016).
