= My Beautiful Sinking Ship =

Studio album by Devics
- Released: September 4, 2001

Professional ratings
Review scores
Source	Rating
Allmusic	link

My Beautiful Sinking Ship is an album by Devics, released on September 4, 2001.

== Track listing ==
1. "Heart and Hands" – 5:43
2. "My Beautiful Sinking Ship" – 3:40
3. "You in the Glass" – 3:45
4. "The Man I Love" – 5:47
5. "You Could Walk Forever" – 4:42
6. "Alone With You" – 5:09
7. "Why I Chose To Never Grow" – 3:19
8. "Living Behind The Sun" – 4:03
9. "Forget Tomorrow" – 5:52
10. "Lost At Sea" – 1:48
11. "Gold In The Girl" – 5:57
12. "I Broke Up" – 4:01
13. "Heaven Please" – 3:46
14. "Five Seconds to Hold You" – 3:54
15. "Blood Red Orange" – 1:58
