= Iris (2016 film) =

2016 film by Jalil Lespert

- Theatrical release poster
- Directed by: Jalil Lespert
- Written by: Andrew Bovell
- Screenplay by: Jalil Lespert; Jérémie Guez
- Based on: Chaos by Hideo Nakata
- Produced by: Wassim Béji; Sylvain Goldberg; Serge de Poucques; Nadia Khamlichni; Giles Waterkeyn
- Starring: Romain Duris; Charlotte Le Bon; Jalil Lespert; Hélène Barbry; Camille Cottin; Adel Bencherif
- Cinematography: Pierre-Yves Bastard
- Edited by: Mike Fromentin
- Music by: Dustin O'Halloran; Adam Wiltzie
- Production companies: Wy Productions; France 2 Cinéma; Nexus Factory; uMedia
- Distributed by: Universal Pictures France
- Release date: 16 November 2016
- Running time: 99 minutes
- Country: France
- Language: French
- Box office: $1.3 million

Iris (English title: In the Shadow of Iris) is a 2016 French erotic thriller drama film co-written and directed by Jalil Lespert and starring Romain Duris, Charlotte Le Bon and Lespert himself.

It is a loose remake of Hideo Nakata's film Chaos (2000). It is available in the United States on Netflix from September 2020 to March 2023.

== Plot ==
Iris Doriot, a beautiful 30-year-old Parisian, convinces a stranger to help fake her own kidnapping in order to leave her husband, Antoine, and start a new life. Max Lopez, a mechanic in debt, agrees to the plot after fixing her car. Iris disappears from the street after lunch with her husband, a rich banker. Iris hides at an empty flat she is watching for a friend. Max ties her up and takes a photo to send to her husband, along with a request for 500,000 euros.

Though told not to phone the police, Antoine does so anyway. They tap his phone and set up surveillance at the train station where Max told Antoine to bring the money. Though the police are not visible, Max hesitates and gets on the train instead of collecting the money from Antoine, who stays on the platform as the police instructed.

Max returns to the house that night to find Iris dead on the bed, with a head wound, just as the police arrive. Max quickly hides her body in a blanket. The police explain the neighbors called because they heard a woman screaming in the flat, but Max is able to convince them his wife left following an argument. That night he buries Iris's body, still wrapped in a blanket, in the woods.

Detectives Nathalie and Malek are suspicious of the kidnapping, but still look into anyone who may have had a grudge against the bank. This leads them to Max, who has a police record in addition to his home being foreclosed. Max denies having anything to do with it, but later sees a news report on Iris Doriot's disappearance. He is shocked to see that the photo shown is not the same woman he knew as Iris, but a woman of a similar age with brown eyes. In a panic, he returns to the woods and digs up the body, which is the same woman shown on TV.

Meanwhile, the woman Max knew as Iris arrives at the bank, where Antoine chastises her for appearing. She worries that Max will go to the police, but Antoine assures her that they have set him up so well that he will not say anything. Max openly follows Antoine to an exclusive, high-end sex club for fetishists, where the fake Iris is performing. Her name is revealed to be Claudia. A flashback reveals that after Max tied Claudia up and left the flat, she freed herself and dragged Iris's dead body, in a state of advanced rigor mortis, onto the bed.

After speaking with Iris's psychiatrist, the police interview Antoine again and ask him about his troubled sex life. He admits he likes S&M and hires prostitutes, as his wife had no interest. Antoine, nervous by the police's line of questioning, calls Max and arranges to meet him. He tells him that they set him up because he is such a failure, but that they didn't expect him to take the body out of the flat. Antoine tells him if he takes credit for Iris's death, all of his debt will be wiped out.

Instead, Max kidnaps Claudia. In a flashback, it is revealed that Iris followed Antoine to his S&M session, where she attacked Claudia, who killed her in self-defense. While Claudia is tied up, Max once again demands 500,000 euros from Antoine, who has no choice but to give him the money.

Max calls Antoine and tells him that he can find Claudia at the flat, but he takes her to a hotel instead, where they have sex. When Antoine arrives at the flat, he discovers Iris's body. He takes her body to his château in Normandy and digs a grave, unaware there is police surveillance. The police arrive as Antoine shoots himself in the head, falling into the open grave on top of Iris.

The next morning, Max and Claudia part, splitting the money equally.

== Cast ==
- Romain Duris as Max Lopez
- Charlotte Le Bon as Claudia / Iris Doriot
- Jalil Lespert as Antoine Doriot
- Camille Cottin as Nathalie Vasseur
- Adel Bencherif as Malek Ziani
- Hélène Barbry as Iris Doriot
- Sophie Verbeeck as Nina Lopez
- Jalis Laleg as Eli Lopez
- Violeta Sanchez as Sarah
- Gina Haller as Laura

== Production ==
The script was written by Andrew Bovell. Originally, the film had to be an American production destined to an American studio. But the project was canceled. Jalil Lespert was contacted to produce a French adaptation of the script.

The film's soundtrack was composed by the ambient music duo A Winged Victory for the Sullen.

Principal photography took place between February – March 11, 2016 on location in Paris.

== Reception ==
=== Critical response ===
Iris received mostly mixed reviews. French review aggregation website AlloCiné has a cumulative six positive reviews, four mixed, and eight negative based on 18 reviews collected.

=== Box office ===
In France, the film made 150 781 entries, grossed $1.3 million.
