= Adam Wiltzie =

American sound engineer and composer

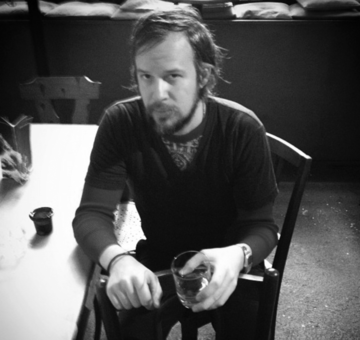

Background information
- Born: Adam Bryanbaum Wiltzie; September 17, 1969 (age 57); New York, New York, U.S.
- Occupations: Musician; composer; sound engineer
- Instruments: Piano; guitar
- Labels: Kranky; Erased Tapes; Ninja Tune; Deutsche Grammophon
- Member of: Stars of the Lid; A Winged Victory for the Sullen; The Dead Texan; Aix Em Klemm; Sleepingdog
- Website: www.artificialpinearchfailures.org

Adam Bryanbaum Wiltzie (born September 17, 1969) is an American composer and sound engineer based in Brussels, Belgium.

== Early life ==
Adam Wiltzie was born on September 17, 1969, in New York City. Originally a champion youth tennis player, a knee injury sustained when he was 16 ended his career. Wiltzie then moved to Austin, Texas, where he lived for 10 years, before moving to Europe.

== Career ==
Wiltzie is best known for his work as a founder of seminal ambient classical projects Stars of the Lid, The Dead Texan, Aix Em Klemm and A Winged Victory for the Sullen. He scored A Winged Victory for the Sullen's 2021 album Invisible Cities, the score to the critically acclaimed theater production directed by Leo Warner.

He has also recorded, played with, and worked as a live sound engineer for artists such as The Flaming Lips, Mercury Rev, Labradford, Bedhead, Pip Proud, The Bad Livers, Windsor for the Derby, Ed Hall, Iron & Wine, Jóhann Jóhannsson, Hauschka and Sparklehorse.

He has written the original scores for several film and television productions including Salero, The Yellow Birds and Iris. He also collaborated with Jóhann Jóhannsson on his scores for The Theory of Everything and Arrival, and wrote two of the main themes with Dustin O'Halloran in the 2016 Oscar-nominated film Lion.

In 2026, Friendship Survival Guide, a collaborative album by Adam Wiltzie and Jóhann Jóhannsson, was announced for release on September 18 by Deutsche Grammophon. The album draws on sessions recorded between 2013 and 2017, with Wiltzie completing the project after Jóhannsson's death in 2018. The album features Tim Hecker and Bryan Senti, while Steve Albini recorded guitar parts at Electrical Audio. To accompany the release of Friendship Survival Guide, Wiltzie collaborated with Belgian director Jonas Govaerts on a three-chapter short film starring Wiltzie and actor Jeroen Perceval in a fictional nocturnal taxi journey. The film was shot in Ghent and Muizen.

== Discography ==
Solo

- Travels in Constants Vol. 24 (Temporary Residence Limited, 2015)
- How to Disappear Inside a Thirty Piece Orchestra (Self-released, 2021)
- Eleven Fugues For Sodium Pentothal (Kranky, 2024)

Stars of the Lid (with Brian McBride)

Sleepingdog (with Chantal Acda)

- Naked in a Clean Bed (Muze, 2006)
- Polar Life (Gizeh, 2008)
- With Our Heads in the Clouds and Our Hearts in the Fields (Gizeh, 2011)

Aix Em Klemm (with Robert Donne)

- Aix Em Klemm (Kranky, 2000)

The Dead Texan (with Christina Vantzou)

- The Dead Texan (Kranky, 2004)

A Winged Victory for the Sullen (with Dustin O'Halloran)

- A Winged Victory for the Sullen (Erased Tapes, 2011)
- Atomos VII [EP] (Kranky, 2014)
- Atomos (Erased Tapes, 2014)
- Iris (Erased Tapes, 2016)
- God's Own Country (2017)
- The Undivided Five (Ninja Tune, 2019)
- Invisible Cities (Artificial Pinearch Manufacturing, 2021)

Adam Wiltzie & Jóhann Jóhannsson

- Friendship Survival Guide (Deutsche Grammophon, 2026)

Film Score Albums

- Salero (Erased Tapes, 2016)
- American Woman (Artificial Pinearch Manufacturing, 2019)

== Filmography ==
Films

Year	Title	Director	Notes
2016	Iris	Jalil Lespert	
2017	The Yellow Birds	Alexandre Moors	
2018	American Woman	Jake Scott	
2022	H4Z4RD	Jonas Govaerts	

Documentaries

Year	Title	Director	Notes
2009	The Passage	Alexander Douglas	
2010	Submission	Stefan Jarl	
2013	Godheten	Stefan Jarl (2)	
2015	Salero	Mike Plunkett	

Short Films

Year	Title	Director	Notes
2010	Want to See Something ?	Tomas Jonsgården	
2018	Blight	Raphaël Crombez	

Television

Year	Title	Production company	Notes
2018	Forever	Amazon Studios	Season 1, Episode 8 - "Goodbye Forever"
