= Jalil Lespert =

French actor and filmmaker (born 1976)

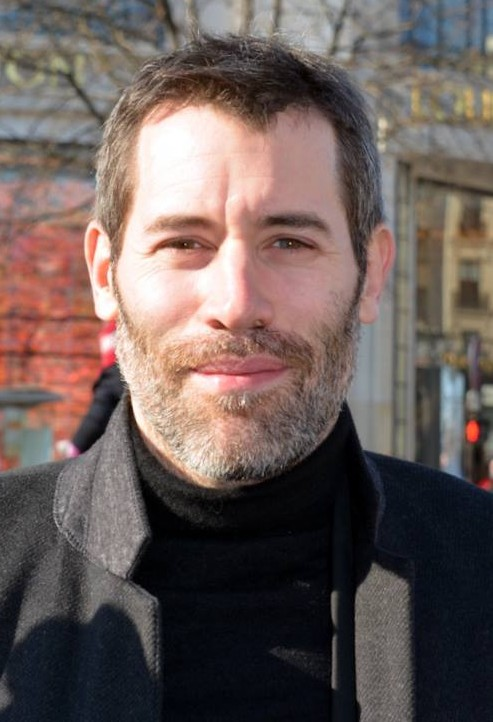
- Lespert in Nominee Luncheon for the 2015 César Awards
- Born: 11 May 1976 (age 50); Paris, France
- Occupations: Director; actor; screenwriter
- Years active: 1995–present

Jalil Lespert (born 11 May 1976) is a French actor, screenwriter and director. He has been described as "one of the best actors of his generation."

== Early life and education ==
Lespert was born in Paris to a pied-noir father, actor Jean Lespert, and a Kabyle Algerian mother who is an attorney and a jurist. Lespert initially studied law to please his mother.

== Career ==
Lespert made his film debut in 1995, in Laurent Cantet's short film Jeux de plage, alongside his father. His first major role came in 1999, in Jacques Maillot's film Our Happy Lives. The following year, he appeared in another Cantet film, Human Resources, which earned him a César Award for Most Promising Actor in 2001.

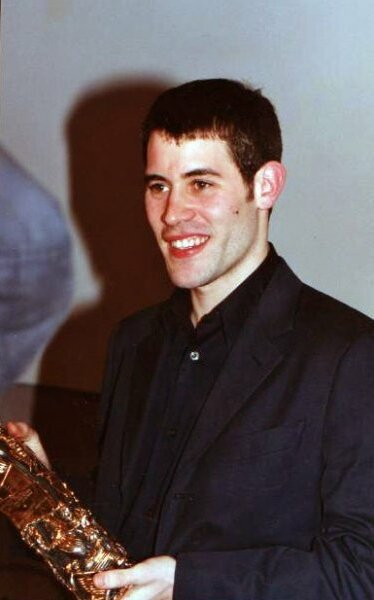
Jalil Lespert at the 2000 César Awards ceremony

Lespert's career took off and he appeared in several films, playing a wide range of characters, such as a sensual gardener in Sade, a body builder addict in Vivre me tue, a boxer in Virgil, a pretentious artist in Alain Resnais's Not on the Lips, and a journalist in Robert Guédiguian's The Last Mitterrand.

Lespert directed his first film in 2007, 24 mesures, featuring Benoît Magimel and Sami Bouajila. His second feature as director, Headwinds in 2011, featured Magimel alongside Audrey Tautou and Isabelle Carré.

In 2010, he appeared in the French television series Pigalle, la nuit.

== Personal life ==
In 2009, Lespert married Sonia Rolland, a former Miss France. The couple had one child (born 2010), and separated in 2018. He also has two other children from a previous relationship.

== Filmography ==
=== As actor ===
Year	Title	Role	Notes	Ref.
1995	Jeux de plage	Éric	Short film; directed by Laurent Cantet; Credited as Djellil Lespert	
1997	Les Sanguinaires	Stéphane	Credited as Djallil Lespert	
1999	Our Happy Lives	Etienne	French: Nos vies heureuses	
1999	Human Resources	Franck	French: Ressources humaines	
1999	A Major Inconvenience	Laurent	French: Un dérangement considérable	
2000	Sade	Augustin		
2001	Inch'Allah Dimanche	Le chauffeur de bus	English: Sunday God Willing	
2001	Bella ciao	Oreste Mancini	Directed by Stéphane Giusti	
2002	L'idole	Philippe	English: The Idol	
2002	Vivre me tue	Daniel Smaïl	English: Life Kills Me	
2003	Les Amateurs	Jamel Mezaoui "J.P."	Directed by Martin Valente	
2003	Not on the Lips	Charley	French: Pas sur la bouche	
2004	L'ennemi naturel	Lieutenant Luhel	Directed by Pierre Erwan Guillaume	
2005	The Last Mitterrand	Antoine Moreau	French: Le Promeneur du Champ de Mars	
2005	Virgil	Virgil		
2005	Le Petit Lieutenant	Antoine Derouère	English: The Young Lieutenant	
2006	Le voyage en Arménie	Simon	Directed by Robert Guédiguian	
2006	Tell No One	Yaël Gonzales	French: Ne le dis à personne	
2008	Pa-ra-da	Miloud		
2009	Ligne de Front	Antoine	Directed by Jean-Christophe Klotz	
2011	Chez Gino	Oncle Giovanni		
2011	A Butterfly Kiss	Paul	French: Un baiser papillon	
2011	Love and Bruises	Giovanni		
2013	Landes	Txomin Iban		
2013	Post partum	Ulysse		
2014	De guerre lasse	Alex	Directed by Olivier Panchot	
2015	First Growth	Charlie Maréchal	French: Premiers crus	
2016	Orphan	Darius	French: Orpheline	
2016	Iris	Antoine Doriot		
2017	The Escape	Philippe		
2018	Magical Nights	Jean-Claude Bernard	Italian: Notti magiche	
2019	Mon frère	Igor	English: Brother	
2020	Dreamchild	François	French: L'enfant rêvé	
2020	Beasts	Sylvain Rousseau	French: La terre des hommes	
2021	Tralala	Benjamin Trescazes		
2021	With or Without You	Mathieu	Italian: Una relazione	
2023	Infinity Pool	Alban Bauer		
2024	GTMax	Elyas		

=== As director and writer ===
- 2007 - 24 Bars (24 mesures)
- 2011 - Headwinds (Des vents contraires)
- 2014 - Yves Saint Laurent
- 2016 - Iris
- 2024 - Dakar Chronicles

== Awards and accolades ==
- César Award for Most Promising Actor (26th César Awards, for Human Resources)
- Lumière Award for Most Promising Actor (6th Lumière Awards, for Human Resources)
- Étoiles d'or du cinéma français (2001, Best Actor, for Human Resources)
