= Christina Vantzou =

- Performing in Seattle, 2009

Background information
- Born: Kansas City, Missouri
- Years active: 2004–present
- Label: Kranky
- Member of: The Dead Texan
- Website: www.christinavantzou.com

Christina Vantzou is a Kansas City, Missouri-born composer and filmmaker of Greek descent based in Brussels, Belgium. First becoming known as one-half of the audio-visual duo The Dead Texan, she has released five albums of orchestral ambient music for Kranky. The albums have been accompanied by short films often making use of slow motion photography, arranged using "dream logic".

In a review of her album No. 3, online music magazine The Attic gave it four stars, describing it as a "sincere, sensible and reflective album."

== Discography ==
The Dead Texan

- The Dead Texan (Kranky, 2004)

Solo

- No. 1 (Kranky, 2011)
- No. 2 (Kranky, 2014)
- No. 3 (Kranky, 2015)
- No. 4 (Kranky, 2018)
- Multi Natural (Edicoes CN, 2020)
- Releasing Spores (Slow Moves, 2021)
- No. 5 (Kranky, 2022)

CV & JAB (Christina Vantzou and John Also Bennett)

- Zin Taylor - Thoughts Of A Dot As It Travels A Surface (Shelter Press, 2018)
- Landscape Architecture (Editions Basilic, 2020)

Other Collaborations

- Christina Vantzou, Michael Harrison and John Also Bennett - S/T (Seance Centre, 2022)
