= A Winged Victory for the Sullen =

American ambient music duo

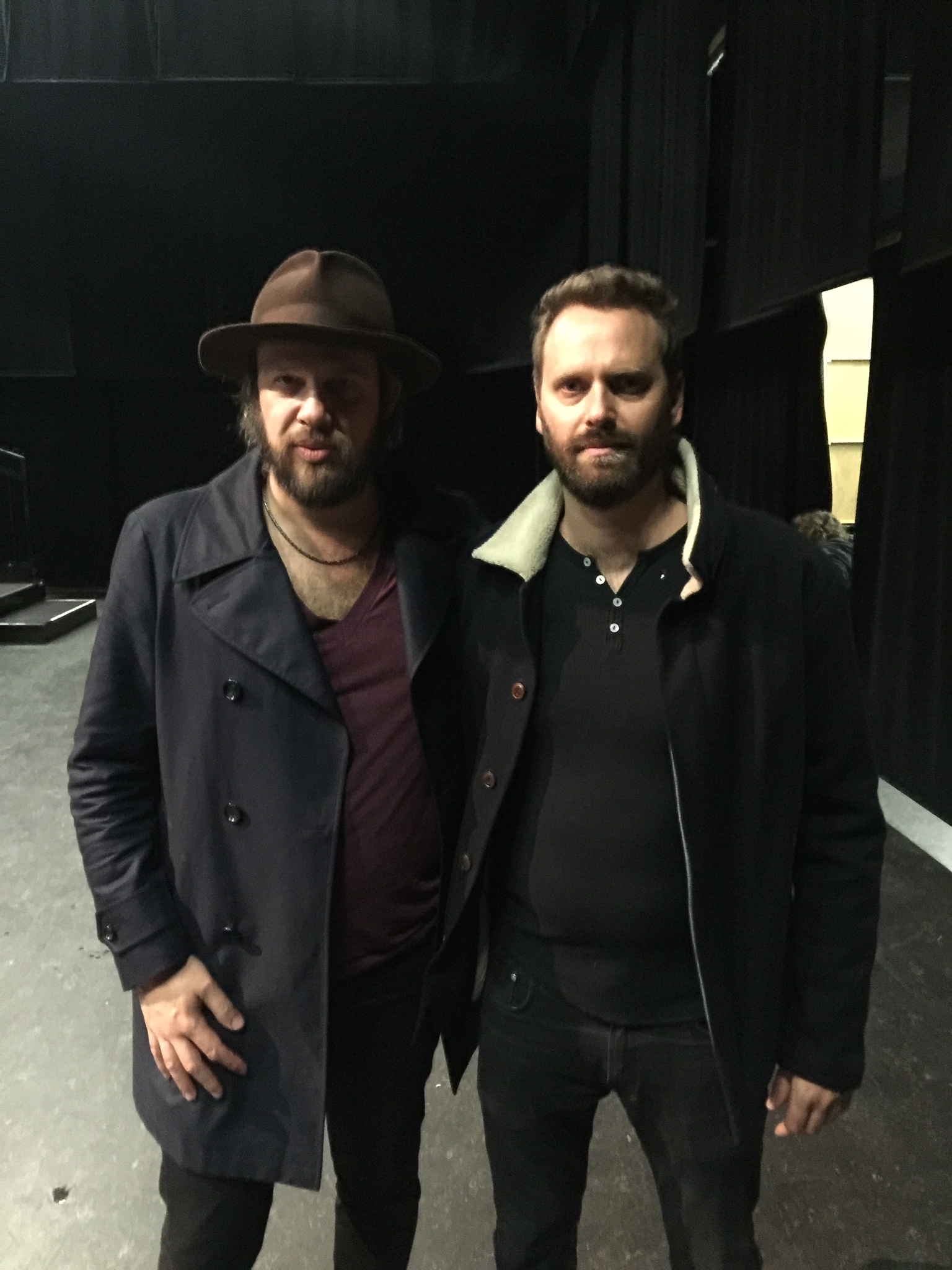
- Adam Wiltzie (left) and Dustin O'Halloran, 2014

Background information
- Origin: United States
- Genres: Ambient; contemporary classical; drone
- Years active: 2011–present
- Labels: Kranky; Erased Tapes; Ninja Tune
- Members: Dustin O'Halloran; Adam Wiltzie
- Website: awvfts.com

A Winged Victory for the Sullen (AWVFTS) is an American ambient music duo composed of Dustin O'Halloran and Adam Wiltzie. They have released four studio albums, an EP, and one soundtrack album. In 2015, they performed at the Royal Albert Hall as part of The Proms.

The duo met while Wiltzie was on tour with Sparklehorse in Bologna, Wiltzie commenting in a 2021 interview that "We just clicked—it's really easy to write music together".

They composed the original score for Atomos, for Wayne McGregor's dance company. It premiered at Sadler's Wells Theatre, London, in 2013. An album of the score, Atomos, was also published. Their third studio album, The Undivided Five, was released by Ninja Tune in 2019. Their latest, Invisible Cities, came out in 2021.

== Discography ==
Studio albums

- A Winged Victory for the Sullen (2011)
- Atomos (2014)
- The Undivided Five (2019)
- Invisible Cities (2021)

EPs

- Atomos VII (2014)

Soundtracks

- Iris (2016)
- God's Own Country (2017)
