= Erased Tapes Records =

UK independent record label

Erased Tapes
- Founded: 2007
- Founder: Robert Raths
- Genre: Contemporary classical, avant-garde, electronic
- Country of origin: United Kingdom
- Location: London, England
- Official website: www.erasedtapes.com

Erased Tapes Records is a London-based independent record label focusing on releasing avant-garde and experimental electronic music.

== History ==
The record company was established by Robert Raths in early 2007 in London, with the release of Ryan Lee West's Vemeer EP under the Aparatec moniker. The label is sometimes mentioned for its strong sonic and visual aesthetic with a special focus on packaging and design, which has seen collaborations with FELD, Supermundane and Gregory Euclide Erased Tapes, until 2018 (with the release ERATP100 "1+1=X"), had the tradition of releasing a free compilation every 10 releases.

In late 2011 Erased Tapes Records opened its publishing arm Erased Tapes Music. In 2014 Erased Tapes Music launched the Meet The Composer series.

In February 2017, Erased Tapes Records opened the Erased Tapes Sound Gallery in London near Victoria Park. The space was meant to be a place where artists of all kinds could showcase their work and people could gain new appreciations of the sonic and visual arts. Raths said the gallery was created in response to hearing about so many struggling artists lacking a place to practice or perform and was very pleased with the result. The Erased Tapes Sound Gallery is now closed.

== Artists ==
- A Winged Victory for the Sullen
- The Art Ensemble of Chicago
- Adam Bryanbaum Wiltzie
- Anne Müller
- Bell Orchestre
- Ben Lukas Boysen
- The British Expeditionary Force
- Codes in the Clouds
- Daniel Brandt
- Daniel Thorne
- David Allred
- Dawn of Midi
- Douglas Dare
- Greg Gives Peter Space
- Guy Andrews
- Hatis Noit
- Högni
- Immix Ensemble
- Kevin Richard Martin
- Kiasmos
- Lubomyr Melnyk
- Masayoshi Fujita
- Michael Price
- Nils Frahm
- Ólafur Arnalds
- Oliveray
- Penguin Cafe
- Penguin Cafe Orchestra
- Peter Broderick
- Qasim Naqvi
- Rival Consoles
- Sebastian Plano
- Shards
- Woodkid
- Vessel
- World's End Girlfriend
