= And Their Refinement of the Decline =

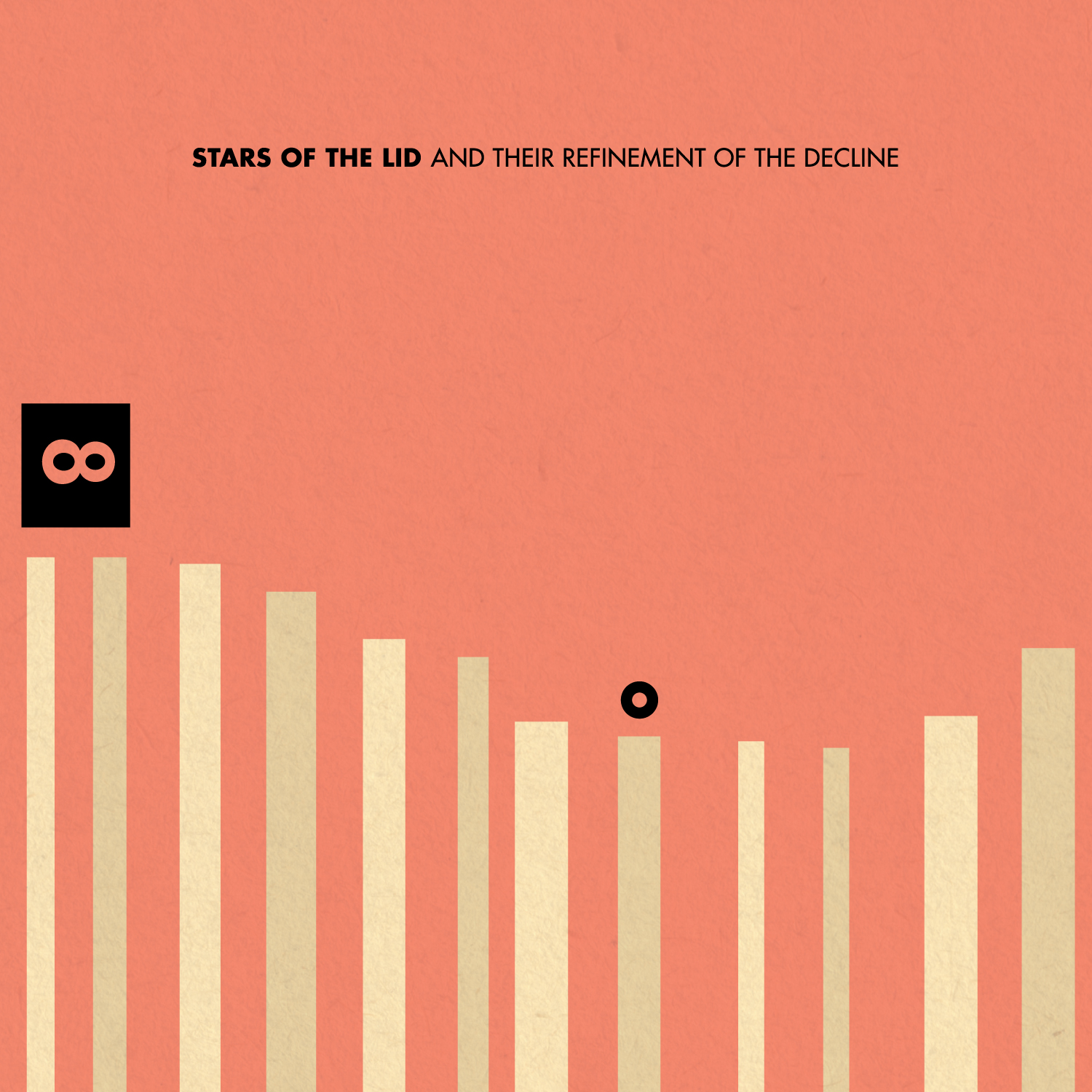

Studio album by Stars of the Lid
- Released: April 2, 2007
- Recorded: Brussels, Belgium; Los Angeles, California
- Genre: Ambient; minimal; drone
- Length: 120:32
- Label: Kranky
- Producer: Adam Wiltzie; Brian McBride

Stars of the Lid chronology
The Tired Sounds Of (2001)	And Their Refinement of the Decline (2007)

Professional ratings
Aggregate scores
Source	Rating
Metacritic	87/100
Review scores
Source	Rating
AllMusic	4.5/5 stars
Cokemachineglow	82%
MusicOMH	5/5 stars
Pitchfork	8.6/10
PopMatters	9/10
Stylus Magazine	B+
Tiny Mix Tapes	5/5

And Their Refinement of the Decline is the seventh studio album by Stars of the Lid, released by Kranky in April 2007. The album was Kranky's 100th release, and was issued as a double CD and as a triple vinyl LP set (featuring alternate artwork). And Their Refinement of the Decline features minimal, droning compositions of varied length created from treated guitar, horn, piano, and other classical instruments.

The track "Dopamine Clouds Over Craven Cottage" refers to Craven Cottage in London, the home stadium of English football club Fulham F.C. At the time of the album's release, their captain was ex-United States soccer international Brian McBride, who shares the same name as Brian McBride from Stars of the Lid. The track "Don't Bother They're Here" uses the melody of Stephen Sondheim's 1973 song "Send in the Clowns." This Sondheim song contains the lyric "Don't bother they're here."

In December 2007, American webzine Somewhere Cold ranked And Their Refinement of the Decline No. 5 on their 2007 Somewhere Cold Awards Hall of Fame.

== Track listing ==
=== Disc one ===
No.	Title	Length
1.	"Dungtitled (in A major)"	5:54
2.	"Articulate Silences, Pt. 1"	5:24
3.	"Articulate Silences, Pt. 2"	5:37
4.	"The Evil That Never Arrived"	5:05
5.	"Apreludes (In C Sharp Major)"	3:44
6.	"Don't Bother They're Here"	10:10
7.	"Dopamine Clouds Over Craven Cottage"	5:55
8.	"Even If You're Never Awake (Deuxième)"	9:20
9.	"Even (Out) +"	4:51
10.	"A Meaningful Moment Through a Meaning(less) Process"	4:32
Total length:		1:00:36

=== Disc two ===
No.	Title	Length
1.	"Another Ballad for Heavy Lids"	4:32
2.	"The Daughters of Quiet Minds"	13:21
3.	"Hiberner Toujours"	1:49
4.	"That Finger on Your Temple Is the Barrel of My Raygun"	5:04
5.	"Humectez La Mouture"	5:31
6.	"Tippy's Demise"	8:18
7.	"The Mouthchew"	3:40
8.	"December Hunting for Vegetarian Fuckface"	17:45
Total length:		Disc 2: 59:56; Total: 120:32

== Credits ==
- Composed and recorded in Brussels, Belgium and Los Angeles, California by Adam Wiltzie and Brian McBride.

=== Additional instrumentation ===
- Sarah Nelson – cello
- Alexander Waterman – cello
- Jeff Rizzy – cello
- Borris Gronemberg – trumpet
- Cedric Manche – flugelhorn
- Toine Thys – clarinet
- Daniel Noesig – trumpet
- Jesse Sparhawk – harp
- Saint-Jean-Baptiste au Béguinage Children's Choir – choir

=== Contributors ===
- Luke Savisky
- Craig McCaffrey
- Pieter DeWagter
- Mr. Kranky
