= The Tired Sounds Of =

Studio album by Stars of the Lid
- Released: October 29, 2001
- Genres: Electronic; ambient
- Length: 123:54
- Label: Kranky

Stars of the Lid chronology
Avec Laudenum (1999)	The Tired Sounds Of (2001)	And Their Refinement of the Decline (2007)

The Tired Sounds Of (also known as The Tired Sounds of Stars of the Lid) is the sixth studio album by the ambient music group Stars of the Lid. It was released on October 29, 2001, via Kranky, and was recorded by the group through sending tapes to each other. It received positive reviews from critics for its composition, and would be considered as the sixth best ambient album of all time by Pitchfork. The album is mainly composed of drones, string instruments, and horns, and spans two CDs. Kranky would repress vinyl copies in 2015, because it was out of print.

== Recording and release ==
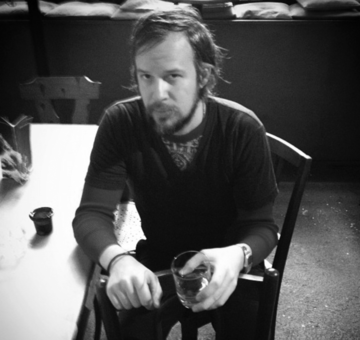
Adam Wiltzie, one-half of Stars of the Lid, in 2016

Stars of the Lid, comprising Adam Wiltzie and Brian McBride, (Note: McBride died in 2023.) mainly recorded the album by sending DAT Tapes to each other. This was because Wiltzie lived in Austin, Texas but was moving to Brussels, while McBride lived in Chicago. They also worked in their homes, because they could not afford recording studios. McBride later said that this was an improvement, as it let them think more carefully on production. Around two recording sessions took place where they worked in the same place. The samplers used for the record were the Akai MPC 2000, used by Wiltzie, and the Ensoniq ASR-10, used by McBride.

The Tired Sounds Of was released on October 29, 2001, through Kranky, on double CD and triple vinyl. According to Wiltzie, it sold around five thousand copies in its first years, but would be sold around ten thousand times after three years, in the span of six to eight months. On August 14, 2015, Kranky issued new vinyl presses of the album and their following album, And Their Refinement of the Decline (2007) for CAD$52, as both were out of print. Around the time of the repressing, marketplaces such as Discogs sold original copies of The Tired Sounds Of for $70.

== Composition ==
The Tired Sounds Of is an electronic and ambient album that heavily uses drones, string instruments, and horns. Tape loops were additionally used, described as subtle and monotonous. It includes eleven unique tracks with five suites, despite "the entire album [feeling] like one whole piece". Reviewers noted the subtle changes in sound as a primary aspect of the album. (Note: Attributed to multiple sources:) The length of it, around two hours, was planned; McBride said in an interview from Rolling Stone that the length was aiming to create an album that would offer something more substantial. The use of silence, crackles, and the addition of instruments were seen by Stylus as enhancing the album. Drowned in Sound described the difference between their previous records and the album as "subtly shifted from the somambulent but cinematic guitar drone of SOTL's past, [...] to a firm commitment to the world of Neo-Classical minimalism". The Globe and Mail compared The Tired Sounds Of to the composer Philip Glass, an Indian harmonium, and the instrumentals of Pink Floyd.

The album starts with the two-track suite "Requiem for Dying Mothers". The first part of the suite includes layered cello and guitars, and the second part adds silence and bass pedals. "Austin Texas Mental Hospital" uses guitar feedback and more varied orchestral instruments, described as "rocking back and forth". The second disc is more spacious than the first, with more use of keyboards. "Gasfarming" contains a reference to the television series Twin Peaks, in which it samples a piece of dialogue from the series: "Big Ed's gas farm." "Piano Aquieu" was highlighted by Pitchfork as a minimalistic track using keyboards, piano, and organs. "Fac 21" is named after a classroom in the University of Texas where lessons of Radio, Television, and Film were taught. "Ballad of Distances" and "A Lovesong (For Cubs) +", the last two suites, are mainly composed of piano alongside string instruments.

== Critical reception ==
Professional ratings
Review scores
Source	Rating
AllMusic	4.5/5 stars
Drowned in Sound	10/10
The Globe and Mail	3/5 stars
Pitchfork	8.6/10
Sputnikmusic	5/5
Stylus	A−
The Winnipeg Sun	3/5 stars

The Tired Sounds Of has received positive reviews from critics. Pitchfork praised it for its composition, as Mark Richardson highlighted its use of dissonance. Todd Burns of Stylus named it as "the full fruition" of Stars of the Lid's work for its structure. AllMusic's Thom Jurek described it as "something unspeakably beautiful and determinedly unmentionable" and the group's most "ambitious" album.

Critics also praised and criticized the album for how it stands in its genre. Tom Eyers from Drowned in Sound gave it a perfect score out of ten, as they felt it showed ambient music as something other than "its often undeserved status as aural wallpaper". A Dusted review from Tom Roberts regarded it as "a record committed to the present experience of its own duration, but moves beyond this moment with the atmosphere it establishes". A PopMatters writer negatively criticized the album for its length, and named it as "the most boring album I've ever heard in my life".

The Tired Sounds Of would be featured in multiple rankings. Pitchfork would call the album the sixth best ambient album of all time and the 187th best album of the 2000s. The first part of "Requiem for Dying Mothers" was also ranked as the 353rd best track of the 2000s by Pitchfork. Fort Worth Star-Telegram ranked it as the eighth best album of 2001.

== Track listing ==
Disc one
No.	Title	Length
1.	"Requiem for Dying Mothers, Part 1"	6:36
2.	"Requiem for Dying Mothers, Part 2"	7:37
3.	"Down 3"	5:46
4.	"Austin Texas Mental Hospital, Part 1"	2:48
5.	"Austin Texas Mental Hospital, Part 2"	12:18
6.	"Austin Texas Mental Hospital, Part 3"	5:47
7.	"Broken Harbors, Part 1"	3:31
8.	"Broken Harbors, Part 2"	6:47
9.	"Broken Harbors, Part 3"	9:16
Total length:		60:26

Disc two
No.	Title	Length
1.	"Mullholland"	6:48
2.	"The Lonely People (Are Getting Lonelier)"	10:07
3.	"Gasfarming"	3:20
4.	"Piano Aquieu"	10:54
5.	"Fac 21"	3:08
6.	"Ballad of Distances, Part 1"	3:36
7.	"Ballad of Distances, Part 2"	3:00
8.	"A Lovesong (For Cubs) +, Part 1"	6:45
9.	"A Lovesong (For Cubs) +, Part 2"	8:05
10.	"A Lovesong (For Cubs) +, Part 3"	7:45
Total length:		63:28

== Personnel ==
The following are adapted from the CD liner notes:

- Adam Wiltzie – composition, recording
- Brian McBride – composition, recording
- Sarah Nelson – violoncello
- Alexander Waterman – violoncello
- Jeff Rizzy – violoncello
- Borris Gronemberg – trumpet
- Credric Manche – flugelhorn
- Toine Thys – clarinet
- Daniel Noesig – trumpet
- Jesse Sparhawk – harp
- Saint-Jean-Baptiste au Béguinage Childrens Choir – choir

The liner notes only list the following as contributors:

- Luke Savisky
- Craig McCaffrey
- Pierre Dewagter
- Mr. Kranky
