= Taphead =

Taphead may refer to:

- Taphead, a Spinal Tap fan
- "Taphead", a Talk Talk song from their 1991 album Laughing Stock
- "Taphead", a Stars of the Lid song from their 1997 album The Ballasted Orchestra
