= Gravitational Pull vs. the Desire for an Aquatic Life =

Studio album by Stars of the Lid
- Released: 1996
- Recorded: East Austin, Texas
- Genre: Ambient, minimalist, drone
- Length: Vinyl: 41:44; CD: 51:08
- Label: Sedimental
- Producer: Brian McBride, Adam Wiltzie

Stars of the Lid chronology
Music for Nitrous Oxide (1995)	Gravitational Pull vs. the Desire for an Aquatic Life (1996)	The Ballasted Orchestra (1997)

Professional ratings
Review scores
Source	Rating
AllMusic	3/5 stars

Gravitational Pull vs. the Desire for an Aquatic Life is the second studio album by ambient drone music group Stars of the Lid. It was recorded on four track and released as an LP on Sedimental in 1996. The album features short, medium and long minimal, droning compositions created from heavily treated guitar, horn, piano and other classical instruments.

== Critical reaction ==
The album received moderate praise from critics. Nitsuh Abebe, writing for AllMusic, stated:

Even more so than most ambient projects, the Stars create an atmosphere that's akin to a sensory deprivation tank, reducing everything to pulsating waves of sound — Gravitational Pull... is consistently effective at this, and is even less dense, at points, than some of the group's other releases.

== Release history ==
Following the vinyl issue from Sedimental in 1996, the album was released on CD in October 1997 on Kranky, and this reissue contained the extra track "Jan. 69". The band was displeased with the Sedimental pressing and therefore delighted when Kranky released it on CD. They wrote,

After approving the test pressing for the original vinyl release, the 709 copies showed up on our doorstep with distortion, giant pops, and surface noise louder than the recording. The plant graciously repressed the records, but we still were disappointed with the overall fidelity. This is obviously why re-releasing it with Kranky was important. "Jan. 69" was a throw-away track that I forgot about from 1992. Anyone interested in 709 damaged records for wall hangings is welcome to come by my shed in E. Austin and take 'em away.

== Track listing ==
=== LP ===
==== Side A ====
1. "The Better Angels of Our Nation"
2. "Cantus II; In Memory of Warren Wiltzie"

==== Side B ====
1. "Lactate's Moment"
2. "Be Little with Me"

=== CD ===
1. "The Better Angels of Our Nation" – 3:56
2. "Cantus II; In Memory of Warren Wiltzie" – 19:03
3. "Jan. 69" – 9:24
4. "Lactate's Moment" – 12:18
5. "Be Little with Me" – 6:27
