= Per Aspera Ad Astra (album) =

Studio album by Stars of the Lid
- Released: November 18, 1998
- Recorded: 1998
- Genre: Ambient, drone, minimalist
- Length: 40:47
- Label: Kranky
- Producer: Stars of the Lid

Stars of the Lid chronology
Maneuvering the Nocturnal Hum (1998)	Per Aspera Ad Astra (1998)	Avec Laudenum (1999)

Per Aspera Ad Astra is the fourth studio album by Stars of the Lid, made in collaboration with artist Jon McCafferty and released on Kranky in 1998. McCafferty approached Stars of the Lid with a view towards collaboration after working on a series of paintings inspired by the duo's 1995 debut Music for Nitrous Oxide. The title is a common Latin phrase translatable as "through hardships, to the stars."

== Liner notes ==
Stars of the Lid elaborated on the album's reasoning on its inner sleeve.

The merging of color and sound is something we've thought about quite often. Why should the visual artist be confined to the packaging while the "musician" is in charge of the rest - especially when both dimensions may reflect back onto each other. We wanted to craft a sound environment that is both true to Jon's painting as well as the larger New York context which envelopes [sic] his work.

== Critical reception ==
Professional ratings
Review scores
Source	Rating
AllMusic	3/5 stars
Pitchfork Media	(8.8/10.0)

John Bush, writing for AllMusic, stated:

Per Aspera Ad Astra is an intriguing 1998 collaboration between tone-generating minimalists Stars of the Lid and line-drawing minimalist Jon McCafferty. The recording was created with plenty of McCafferty's work around for inspiration (and incorporated environmental samples of him painting), then the sleeve was prepared by McCafferty once he'd immersed himself in the album. Separated into two sides, Per Aspera Ad Astra reveals precious little of McCafferty's working habits; except for faint rustlings in the background and passing traffic, the environmental portion is whispery and thin. The concept does allow for a degree of context within Stars of the Lid's music, though, always a good thing when a recording is as ambient and ephemeral as this. Deep and warmly atmospheric, with (per usual) few nods toward traditional instrumentation, the pair focus on indie-space music except at the beginning of side two, when a string section provides a brief interruption.

== Track listing ==
1. "Low Level (Listening)+, Part 1" – 6:22
2. "Low Level (Listening)+, Part 2" – 8:42
3. "Low Level (Listening)+, Part 3" – 5:29
4. "Anchor States, Part 1" – 4:27
5. "Anchor States, Part 2" – 8:51
6. "Anchor States, Part 3" – 6:46

== Personnel ==
- Adam Wiltzie
- Brian McBride
- S. Nelson
- B. Anderton
- C. McCaffrey
