= Avec Laudenum =

Studio album by Stars of the Lid
- Released: December 7, 1999
- Recorded: 1999
- Genres: Ambient, drone
- Length: 42:07
- Label: Sub Rosa
- Producer: Stars of the Lid

Stars of the Lid chronology
Per Aspera Ad Astra (1998)	Avec Laudenum (1999)	The Tired Sounds Of... (2001)

Avec Laudenum is the fifth studio album released by Stars of the Lid. It was originally released on Sub Rosa in 1999 and then re-released on Chicago indie Kranky in late 2002. The title translates as "With Laudanum", laudanum being an opiate. The first three tracks are three sections of one long piece but, while within the minimalist vein, they have some variation and movement. The final two, individual tracks are more minimalist than the former and create a "floating bliss" atmosphere. By the time of this recording, band members Adam Wiltzie and Brian McBride were residing in Brussels, Belgium, and Los Angeles, California, respectively. It is reported that a vast proportion of this album was recorded through mail, with ideas being sent back and forth between the duo.

== Critical reception ==
Professional ratings
Review scores
Source	Rating
AllMusic	4/5 stars
Pitchfork Media	(8.0/10.0)

The album was generally praised by critics. John Bush, writing for AllMusic, stated:

Avec Laudenum moves at a glacier's pace and, slowly yet surely, calls to mind the glazed eye, vacant trance, and pure (temporary) euphoria of the heavy laudanum user. "The Atomium," a three-part work, takes all of 16 minutes to gradually build from a series of softened drones into the exquisite ambience of an orchestra lulling heaven itself to sleep, only to halt the reverie by (just as gradually) introducing ominous backmasked guitars. Of the other two pieces, "Dust Breeding" has much the same effect and feeling of transcendence, while "I Will Surround You" has slightly more of a Technicolor feel. Avec Laudenum is a magnificent piece of minimalist ambience.

== Track listing ==
1. "The Atomium, Part One" – 5:32
2. "The Atomium, Part Two" – 10:43
3. "The Atomium, Part Three" – 6:17
4. "Dust Breeding (1.316)+" – 9:08
5. "I Will Surround You" – 10:28
