= You Are the One I Pick =

Studio album by Felix
- Released: 2 November 2009
- Length: 34:20
- Label: Kranky

Felix chronology
You Are the One I Pick (2009)	Oh Holy Molar (2012)

You Are the One I Pick is the debut studio album by English chamber pop group Felix. It was released on 2 November 2009 through Kranky. It received generally favorable reviews from critics.

== Background ==
Felix were an English chamber pop group. Lucinda Chua met Chris Summerlin in 2004. After Chua gave Summerlin a CD of home recordings she had made, they began making music together and formed Felix. You Are the One I Pick is their debut album. For the album, they were joined by drummer Elvis Beetham. It was released on 2 November 2009 through Kranky.

== Critical reception ==
Professional ratings
Aggregate scores
Source	Rating
Metacritic	65/100
Review scores
Source	Rating
AllMusic	4/5 stars
Cokemachineglow	76%
Drowned in Sound	9/10
Pitchfork	7.1/10
PopMatters	6/10
XLR8R	5/10

According to the review aggregator Metacritic, You Are the One I Pick received "generally favorable reviews" based on a weighted average score of 65 out of 100 from 6 critic scores.

Matthew Murphy of Pitchfork wrote, "Informed in part by Chua's classical training, the album strikes an airy balance nearby the quieter moments of PJ Harvey's White Chalk and the spare chamber work of Rachel's' Music for Egon Schiele." Ned Raggett of AllMusic stated, "While comparisons can be made, there's something quietly but persistently unique about the duo's work that suggests its own realm, quirky and wry but not simply a showcase for lyrical wit, gently swinging and twangy without losing a sense of calm hush." Andrzej Lukowski of BBC described the album as "a hazy 34 minutes of minimal but nonstop music, an almost slowcore-like trickle of distant pianos, sparse, slow thickets of bendy strings and the occasional sonorous garnish of Chua's cello."

Drowned in Sound included it in their year-end list of the "Lost 9 of '09". The A.V. Club included it in their year-end list of "The Best Non-2010 Music We Discovered in 2010".

== Track listing ==
All tracks are written by Felix.

You Are the One I Pick track listing
No.	Title	Length
1.	"Death to Everyone but Us"	2:43
2.	"You Are the One I Pick"	2:35
3.	"Ode to the Marlboro Man"	2:34
4.	"I Wish I Was a Pony"	2:45
5.	"Where Is My Dragon"	3:02
6.	"Waltzing for Weasels"	3:36
7.	"What I Learned from TV"	4:59
8.	"Back in Style"	2:29
9.	"Bernard St."	4:53
10.	"Lifter"	3:19
11.	"Song About Zoo"	1:25
Total length:		34:20

== Personnel ==
Credits adapted from liner notes.

- Lucinda Chua – vocals, piano, cello, photography
- Chris Summerlin – guitar, bass guitar, percussion, layout
- Elvis Beetham – drums
- Gareth Hardwick – recording, mixing
- Ian Scanlon – recording
- Felix – mixing
- Peter Fletcher – mastering
