= Forma =

Forma is a Latin and Italian word meaning "form, shape, appearance".

Both the Latin forma and the English form are used interchangeably as informal terms in biology:

- Form (zoology)
- Form (botany)

== Other uses ==
- Forma or Forma 1, group of Italian artists formed in 1947
- Forma, Numidia, a former Ancient city and bishopric, now a Latin Catholic titular see
- Forma (band)
- Forma (Toronto), a skyscraper complex
