= Eels with Strings: Live at Town Hall =

2006 live album by Eels

Live album and DVD by Eels
- Released: February 20, 2006
- Recorded: June 30, 2005, The Town Hall, New York City, New York, United States
- Genre: Indie rock
- Length: 63:05
- Label: Vagrant
- Producer: E

Eels chronology
Blinking Lights and Other Revelations (2005)	Eels with Strings: Live at Town Hall (2006)	Hombre Lobo (2009)

Professional ratings
Review scores
Source	Rating
AllMusic	4/5 stars
Pitchfork Media	(6.7/10)

Eels with Strings: Live at Town Hall is a live album by Eels, released on CD and DVD on February 20, 2006 in the United Kingdom and the following day in the United States. The recording is from New York City's Town Hall, June 30, 2005. It is the first live Eels album with a general release, and the first Eels DVD.

== CD track listing ==
All songs written by E, except where noted:

1. "Blinking Lights (For Me)" – 2:03
2. "Bride of Theme from Blinking Lights" – 1:36
3. "Bus Stop Boxer" (E, John Parish) – 3:24
4. "Dirty Girl" – 2:53
5. "Trouble with Dreams" – 3:21
6. "The Only Thing I Care About" (E, Parthenon Huxley) – 2:14
7. "My Beloved Monster" – 1:53
8. "Pretty Ballerina" (Michael Brown) – 2:35
9. "It's a Motherfucker" – 2:15
10. "Flyswatter" – 5:02
11. "Novocaine for the Soul" (E, Mark Goldenberg) – 3:06
12. "Girl from the North Country" (Bob Dylan) – 2:49
13. "Railroad Man" – 2:28
14. "I Like Birds" – 2:30
15. "If You See Natalie" – 3:30
16. "Poor Side of Town" (Lou Adler, Johnny Rivers) – 2:44
17. "Spunky" – 3:04
18. "I'm Going to Stop Pretending that I Didn't Break Your Heart" – 3:45
19. "Suicide Life" – 2:39
20. "Losing Streak" – 2:17
21. "Hey Man (Now You're Really Living)" – 2:17
22. "Things the Grandchildren Should Know" – 4:54

iTunes bonus tracks

The Internet-only release on iTunes also includes three bonus tracks:

23. "Mr. E's Beautiful Blues" (E, Michael Simpson) – 3:05
24. "Living Life" (Daniel Johnston) – 2:35
25. "I Could Never Take the Place of Your Man" (Prince) – 3:38

Eels with Strings: Live at Town Hall

Video by Eels
- Released: February 20, 2006
- Recorded: June 30, 2005, The Town Hall, New York City, New York, United States
- Genre: Indie rock
- Length: 99:00 (+ 22:00 of extras)
- Language: English
- Label: Image Entertainment
- Director: Niels Alpert
- Producer: E

Professional ratings
Review scores
Source	Rating
AllMusic	4/5 stars

== DVD track listing ==
1. I Heart NY
2. "Theme from Blinking Lights"
3. "Going to Your Funeral Part 2" (E and Jim Jacobsen) – 1:53
4. "Dust of Ages" (E and Jacobsen) – 2:06
5. "In the Yard, Behind the Church" – 3:12
6. Ladies of EELS
7. "Bride of Theme from Blinking Lights" – 1:36
8. "From Which I Came/A Magic World" – 2:12
9. The Chet
10. "Son of a Bitch" (E and Jim Lang) – 2:29
11. "Blinking Lights (For Me)" – 2:03
12. Big Al
13. "Dirty Girl" – 2:53
14. "My Beloved Monster" – 1:53
15. On the Road
16. "The Only Thing I Care About" (E and Huxley) – 2:14
17. "Bus Stop Boxer" (E and Parish) – 3:24
18. "Pretty Ballerina" (Brown) – 2:35
19. E on the A
20. "I Like Birds" – 2:30
21. "Girl from the North Country" (Dylan) – 2:49
22. The Late EELS
23. "Railroad Man" – 2:28
24. "Trouble with Dreams" – 3:21
25. Backstage Tomfoolery
26. "If You See Natalie" – 3:30
27. "I'm Going to Stop Pretending that I Didn't Break Your Heart" – 3:45
28. "Dead of Winter" – 3:03
29. Groupies
30. "Flyswatter" – 5:02
31. "Novocaine for the Soul" (E and Mark Goldenberg) – 3:06
32. "Losing Streak" – 2:17
33. "The Stars Shine in the Sky Tonight" (E and Lang) – 3:06
34. "Souljacker Part 2" (E and Lang) – 1:29
35. E Is Lost
36. "Hey Man (Now You're Really Living)" – 2:17
37. "Things the Grandchildren Should Know" – 4:54
38. "Dog Faced Boy" (E and Parish) – 3:09
39. The Adulation of Thousands
40. Emergency Commentary (played over Prince's "I Could Never Take the Place of Your Man")
41. "Mr. E's Beautiful Blues" (E and Simpson) – 3:05
42. "Blinking Lights (For You)"

=== Bonus features ===
Four behind-the-scenes documentary segments (Cribs, Bobby Jr., Boring, and Another Day at the Office), music videos for "Hey Man (Now You're Really Living)", and "Trouble with Dreams."

== Personnel ==
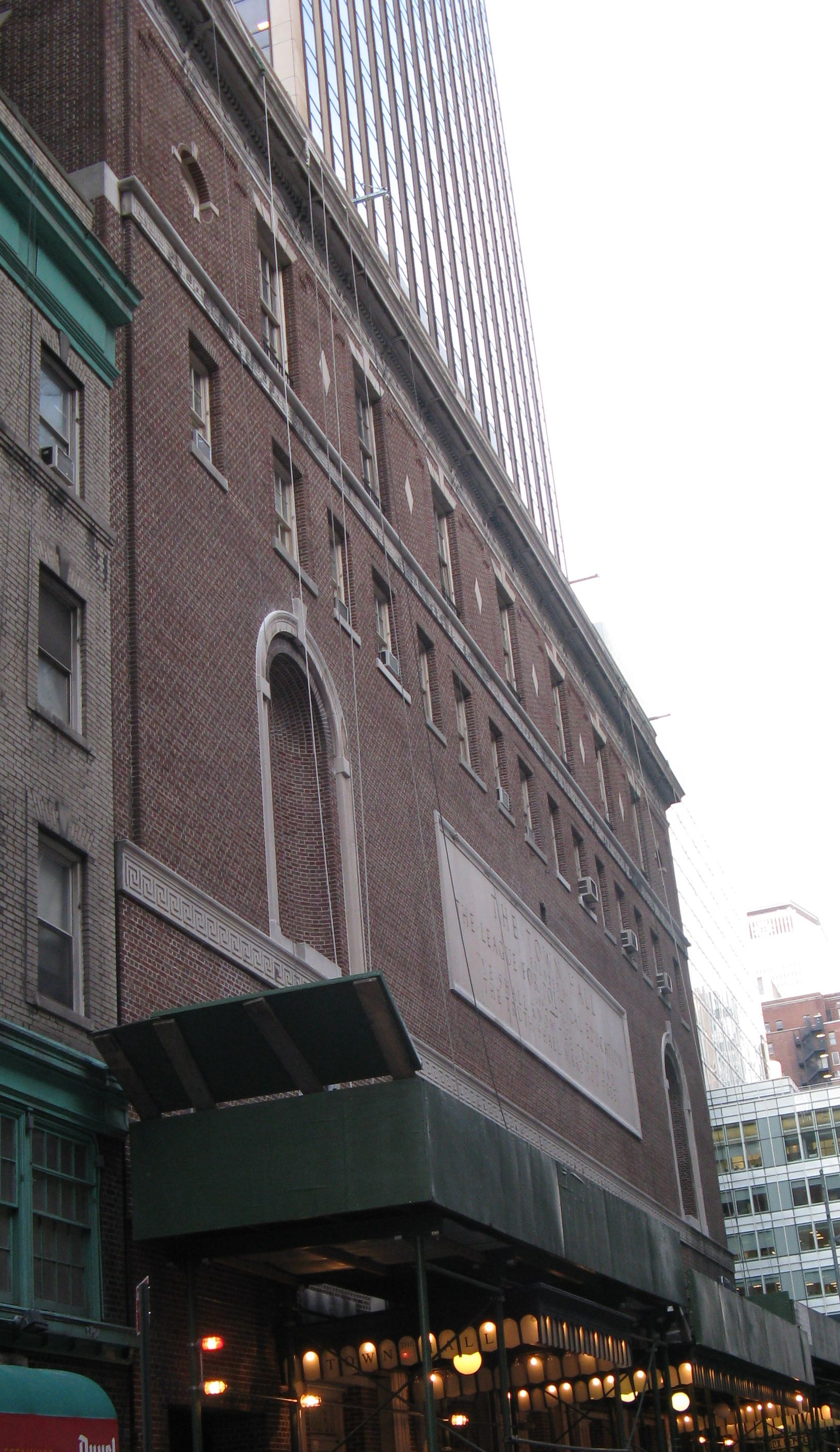
New York's Town Hall hosted Eels in 2005

Eels

- Big Al – upright bass, autoharp, keyboards, and melodica
- Julie – violin, mandolin, and percussion
- The Chet – trash can, suitcase, saw, lap steel guitar, guitar, mandolin, melodica, keyboards, and upright bass
- E – vocals, guitar, and keyboards
- Ana Lenchantin – cello, percussion, and vibrator
- Heather Lockie – viola and percussion
- Paloma Udovic – violin and percussion

Technical personnel

- Niels Alpert – still photography
- Paul Brainard – string arrangement
- Jim Lang – string arrangement
- Koool G Murder – string arrangement
- Wendy Peyton – cover photo

Compact Disc

- Dan Hersch – mastering
- Douglas Trantow – mixing

DVD

- Adamocrea – Puklepop clip
- Niels Alpert – direction and editing
- John Chaisson – production
- Lucy DiLorenzo – production coordination
- Jesse Dylan – direction on "Trouble with Dreams"
- Caleb Heineman – location sound mixing
- Jake Oelman – editing
- Josh Levy – audio mixing
- Douglas Trantow – music mixing
