= The Patience Fader =

Studio album by Pan American
- Released: February 18, 2022
- Length: 39:51
- Label: Kranky
- Producer: Mark K. Nelson

Pan American chronology
A Son (2019)	The Patience Fader (2022)

The Patience Fader is a studio album by Pan American, a solo project of American musician Mark Nelson of Labradford. It was released on February 18, 2022, through Kranky. It received generally favorable reviews from critics.

== Background ==
The Patience Fader is Pan American's first studio album since A Son (2019). It is entirely instrumental. Mark Nelson created the album alone in his home, using electric, acoustic, and lap steel guitars, with electronics and harmonica, during the COVID-19 pandemic. Music videos were released for "Swimming in a Western Motel", "Outskirts, Dreamlit", "Corniel", "Nightwater", and "Grounded".

== Critical reception ==
Professional ratings
Aggregate scores
Source	Rating
Metacritic	78/100
Review scores
Source	Rating
AllMusic	3.5/5 stars
Mojo	4/5 stars
PopMatters	7/10
Uncut	8/10

According to the review aggregator Metacritic, The Patience Fader received "generally favorable reviews" based on a weighted average score of 78 out of 100 from 6 critic scores.

Jon Dale of Uncut stated, "these 12 songs are given just enough space to develop a clutch of themes, mostly on guitar, which are then wrapped in textual detail via effects and subtle electronics." David Sheppard of Mojo commented that "The Patience Fader finds Nelson in something close to solo guitar mode; his signature etiolated twang occasionally augmented by splashes of lap steel, harmonica and distant, twinkling electronics." Anthony D'Amico of Brainwashed described the album as "a languorously meditative and unrepentantly lowercase suite of songs, blurring the lines between an 'ageless, scarred' Americana and dreamlike ambient drift."

Paul Simpson of AllMusic stated, "Because of its lack of vocals, The Patience Fader sounds a bit more open and free than A Son, and somehow manages to say more with less." Justin Vellucci of PopMatters commented that "Nelson continues to master Pan American's melancholy, lost highway brand of sound on The Patience Fader and longtime listeners won't be taken aback by surprises but, instead, courted and played out by the familiar."

== Track listing ==
All tracks are written by Mark K. Nelson.

The Patience Fader track listing
No.	Title	Length
1.	"Swimming in a Western Motel"	2:49
2.	"Outskirts, Dreamlit"	6:28
3.	"Corniel"	2:46
4.	"The North Line"	4:01
5.	"Baitshop"	0:27
6.	"Harmony Conversion"	3:08
7.	"Memorizing, Memorizing"	2:36
8.	"Just a Story"	4:57
9.	"Nightwater"	2:34
10.	"Wooster, Ohio"	1:30
11.	"Almost Grown"	4:54
12.	"Grounded"	3:41
Total length:		39:51

== Personnel ==
Credits adapted from liner notes.

- Mark K. Nelson – performance, production
- Craig McCaffrey – sleeve
