= A Son (album) =

Studio album by Pan American
- Released: November 8, 2019
- Length: 40:12
- Label: Kranky
- Producer: Mark K. Nelson

Pan American chronology
Cloud Room, Glass Room (2013)	A Son (2019)	The Patience Fader (2022)

A Son is a studio album by Pan American, a solo project of American musician Mark Nelson of Labradford. It was released on November 8, 2019, through Kranky. It received generally favorable reviews from critics.

== Background ==
A Son is Pan American's first studio album since Cloud Room, Glass Room (2013). It was written and recorded in Mark Nelson's home in Evanston, Illinois, and honed during a tour in Europe. For the album, Nelson took inspiration from June Tabor, the Carter Family, Suicide, and Jimmy Reed. He sings and plays guitar and hammered dulcimer on the album.

The album closes with an instrumental rendition of the traditional folk song "Shenandoah". Nelson began playing the song in the days after the Charlottesville car attack, where Heather Heyer was killed while protesting against a white supremacist/neo-Nazi rally on August 12, 2017. He said, "It is intended as a tribute to the hero she was and a requiem for the person she was not permitted to become."

== Critical reception ==
Professional ratings
Aggregate scores
Source	Rating
Metacritic	77/100
Review scores
Source	Rating
AllMusic	3.5/5 stars
Exclaim!	9/10
Mojo	4/5 stars
PopMatters	7/10 stars

According to the review aggregator Metacritic, A Son received "generally favorable reviews" based on a weighted average score of 77 out of 100 from 5 critic scores.

David Sheppard of Mojo commented that "A Son finds Mark Nelson recalibrating his long-standing Pan American alias, dialling down the gauzy electronics of yore in favour of an uncluttered, semi-acoustic signature, with prominent use of languid, spiralling guitar melodies and liminal, semi-spoken vocals that recall his contributions to '90s post-rock outliers Labradford." Paul Simpson of AllMusic stated, "Stepping back from the shimmering dub-techno and static-filled glitch of the project's earlier releases, A Son takes a sideways glance at country and folk traditions." He added, "A Son may be a return to Nelson's roots, but it still fits snugly within his catalog of spacious meditations."

== Track listing ==
All tracks are written by Mark K. Nelson, except for "Shenandoah".

A Son track listing
No.	Title	Length
1.	"Ivory Joe Hunter, Little Walter"	1:45
2.	"Memphis Helena"	7:34
3.	"Sleepwalk Guitars"	3:38
4.	"Brewthru"	3:32
5.	"Dark Birds, Empty Fields"	2:54
6.	"Drunk Father"	6:53
7.	"Muriel Spark"	4:55
8.	"Kept Quiet"	2:30
9.	"Shenandoah"	6:31
Total length:		40:12

== Personnel ==
Credits adapted from liner notes.

- Mark K. Nelson – guitar, hammered dulcimer, vocals, production
