= Factor T =

Book by Stefan Themerson

- First edition
- Author: Stefan Themerson
- Language: English
- Publisher: Gaberbocchus Press
- Publication date: 1956
- Publication place: United Kingdom

Factor T is a book first published in 1956 by the Polish writer, philosopher, filmmaker, composer, and poet Stefan Themerson. It was originally written as a letter to Bertrand Russell.

Factor T is based upon Themerson's theory that the eternal tragedy (factor T) of humanity is found in the conflict between the urge to satisfy certain desires and the aversion against the actions required for such satisfaction.
