= Send In the Clowns =

Song written by Stephen Sondheim for the 1973 musical A Little Night Music

"Send In the Clowns" is a song written by Stephen Sondheim for the 1973 musical A Little Night Music, an adaptation of Ingmar Bergman's 1955 film Smiles of a Summer Night. It is a ballad from Act Two, in which the character Desirée reflects on the ironies and disappointments of her life. Among other things, she looks back on an affair years earlier with the lawyer Fredrik, who was deeply in love with her, but whose marriage proposals she had rejected. Meeting him after so long, she realizes she is in love with him and finally ready to marry him, but now it is he who rejects her, as he is in an unconsummated marriage with a much younger woman. Desirée proposes marriage to rescue him from this situation, but he declines, citing his dedication to his bride. Reacting to his rejection, Desirée sings this song. The song is later reprised as a coda after Fredrik's young wife runs away with his son, and Fredrik is finally free to accept Desirée's offer.

Sondheim wrote the song specifically for Glynis Johns, who originated the role of Desirée on Broadway. The song is structured with four verses and a bridge, and uses a complex compound meter. It became Sondheim's most popular song after Frank Sinatra recorded it in 1973 and Judy Collins's version charted in 1975 and 1977. Subsequently, numerous other artists recorded the song, and it has become a standard.

== Meaning of title ==
The "clowns" in the lyrics and title does not specifically refer to circus clowns, as Sondheim explained in an interview:

I get a lot of letters over the years asking what the title means and what the song's about; I never thought it would be in any way esoteric. I wanted to use theatrical imagery in the song, because she's an actress, but it's not supposed to be a circus [...] [I]t's a theater reference meaning "if the show isn't going well, let's send in the clowns"; in other words, "let's do the jokes." I always want to know, when I'm writing a song, what the end is going to be, so "Send in the Clowns" didn't settle in until I got the notion, "Don't bother, they're here", which means that "We are the fools."

In a 2003 interview, Sondheim further clarified:

As I think of it now, the song could have been called "Send in the Fools". I knew I was writing a song in which Desirée is saying, "aren't we foolish" or "aren't we fools?" Well, a synonym for fools is clowns, but "Send in the Fools" doesn't have the same ring to it.

== Context ==
Judi Dench, who performed the role of Desirée in London, commented on the context of the song during an interview with Alan Titchmarsh. The play is "a dark play about people who, at the beginning, are with wrong partners and in the end it is hopefully going to become right, and she (Desirée) mistimes her life in a way and realizes when she re-meets the man she had an affair with and had a child by (though he does not know that), that she loves him and he is the man she wants."

Some years before the play begins, Desirée was a young, attractive actress, whose passions were the theater and romance. She lived her life dramatically, flitting from man to man. Fredrik was one of her many lovers and fell deeply in love with Desirée, but she declined to marry him. The play implies that when they parted Desirée may have been pregnant with his child.

A few months before the play begins, Fredrik married a beautiful young woman who at 18 years old was much younger than he. In Act One, Fredrik meets Desirée again, and is introduced to her daughter, a precocious adolescent suggestively named Fredrika. Fredrik explains to Desirée that he is now married to a young woman he loves very much, but that she is still a virgin, continuing to refuse to have sex with him. Desirée and Fredrik then have sex.

Act Two begins days later, and Desirée realizes that she truly loves Fredrik. She tells Fredrik that he needs to be rescued from his marriage, and she proposes to him. Fredrik explains to Desirée that he has been swept off the ground and is "in the air" in love with his beautiful, young wife, and apologizes for having misled her. Desirée remains sitting on the bed; depending on the production, Fredrik walks across the room or stays seated on the bed next to her. Desirée – feeling both intense sadness and anger, at herself, her life and her choices – sings "Send in the Clowns". She is, in effect, using the song "to cover over a moment when something has gone wrong on stage. Midway through the second Act she has deviated from her usual script by suggesting to Fredrik the possibility of being together seriously and permanently, and, having been rejected, she falters as a show-person, finds herself bereft of the capacity to improvise and wittily cover. If Desirée could perform at this moment – revert to the innuendos, one-liners and blithe self-referential humour that constitutes her normal character – all would be well. She cannot, and what follows is an exemplary manifestation of Sondheim's musico-dramatic complexity, his inclination to write music that performs drama. That is, what needs to be covered over (by the clowns sung about in the song) is the very intensity, ragged emotion and utter vulnerability that comes forward through the music and singing itself, a display protracted to six minutes, wrought with exposed silences, a shocked Fredrik sitting so uncomfortably before Desirée while something much too real emerges in a realm where he – and his audience – felt assured of performance."

Not long thereafter, Fredrik's young wife runs away with his son, so he is free to accept Desirée's proposal, and the song is reprised as a coda.

== Score ==
=== History ===
Sondheim wrote the lyrics and music over a two-day period during rehearsals for the play's Broadway debut, specifically for the actress Glynis Johns, who created the role of Desirée. According to Sondheim, "Glynis had a lovely, crystal voice, but sustaining notes was not her thing. I wanted to write short phrases, so I wrote a song full of questions" and the song's melody is within a small music range:

We hired Glynis Johns to play the lead, though she had a nice little silvery voice. But I'd put all the vocal weight of the show on the other characters because we needed somebody who was glamorous, charming and could play light comedy, and pretty, and to find that in combination with a good voice is very unlikely, but she had all the right qualities and a nice little voice. So I didn't write much for her and I didn't write anything in the second act.

And the big scene between her and her ex-lover, I had started on a song for him because it's his scene. And Hal Prince, who directed it, said he thought that the second act needed a song for her, and this was the scene to do it in. And so he directed the scene in such a way that even though the dramatic thrust comes from the man's monologue, and she just sits there and reacts, he directed it so you could feel the weight going to her reaction rather than his action.

And I went down and saw it and it seemed very clear what was needed, and so that made it very easy to write. And then I wrote it for her voice, because she couldn't sustain notes. Wasn't that kind of singing voice. So I knew I had to write things in short phrases, and that led to questions, and so again, I wouldn't have written a song so quickly if I hadn't known the actress ... I wrote most of it one night and finished part of the second chorus, and I'd gotten the ending ... [T]he whole thing was done in two days.

=== Lyrics ===
The lyrics of the song are written in four verses and a bridge and sung by Desirée. As Sondheim explains, Desirée experiences both deep regret and furious anger:

"Send in the Clowns" was never meant to be a soaring ballad; it's a song of regret. And it's a song of a lady who is too upset and too angry to speak – meaning to sing for a very long time. She is furious, but she doesn't want to make a scene in front of Fredrik because she recognizes that his obsession with his 18 year-old wife is unbreakable. So she gives up; so it's a song of regret and anger, and therefore fits in with short-breathed phrases.

=== Meter and key ===
The song was originally performed in the key of D♭ major.

The song uses an unusual and complex meter, which alternates between 12/8 and 9/8. These are compound meters that evoke the sense of a waltz used throughout the score of the show. Sondheim tells the story:

When I worked with Leonard Bernstein on West Side Story, one of the things I learned from him was not always necessarily to think in terms of 2-, 4- and 8-bar phrases. I was already liberated enough before I met him not to be sticking to 32-bar songs, but I tend to think square. I tend to think ... it's probably because I was brought up on mid-19th and late-19th century music, and you know it's fairly square; there are not an awful lot of meter changes.

You often will shorten or lengthen a bar for rhythmic purposes and for energy, but ... when you switch in the middle [of a song], particularly when it's a modest song, when you're not writing an aria, you know ... [I mean,] if you're writing something like Sweeney Todd, where people sing at great length, you expect switches of meter, because it helps variety. But in a little 36- or 40-bar song, to switch meters around is almost perverse, because the song doesn't get a chance to establish its own rhythm.

But the problem is, what would you do?: Would you go, "Isn't it rich? (two, three) Are we a pair? (two, three) Me here at last on the ground (three), you in mid-air." Lenny [Bernstein] taught me to think in terms of, "Do you really need the extra beat (after 'ground') or not." Just because you've got four bars of four, if you come across a bar that doesn't need the extra beat, then put a bar of three in. So ... the 9 [beat bars] and 12 [beat bars] that alternate in that song were not so much consciously arrived at as they were by the emotionality of the lyric.

== Styles ==
"Send in the Clowns" is performed in two completely different styles: dramatic and lyric. The dramatic style is the theatrical performance by Desirée, and this style emphasizes Desirée's feelings of anger and regret, and the dramatic style acts as a cohesive part of the play. The lyric style is the concert performance, and this style emphasizes the sweetness of the melody and the poetry of the lyrics. Most performances are in concert, so they emphasize the beauty of the melody and lyrics.

Sondheim teaches both dramatic and lyric performers several important elements for an accurate rendition:

The dramatic performer must take on the character of Desirée: a woman who finally realizes that she has misspent her youth on the shallow life. She is both angry and sad, and both must be seen in the performance. Two important examples are the contrast between the lines, "Quick, send in the clowns" and "Well, maybe next year." Sondheim teaches that the former should be steeped in self-loathing, while the latter should emphasize regret. Thus, the former is clipped, with a break between "quick" and "send," while the latter "well" is held pensively.

Sondheim apologizes for flaws in his composition. For example, in the line, "Well, maybe next year," the melodic emphasis is on the word year but the dramatic emphasis must be on the word next:

The word "next" is important: "Maybe next year" as opposed to "this year". [Desirée means,] "All right, I've screwed it up this year. Maybe next year I'll do something right in my life." So [it's] "well, maybe next year" even though it isn't accented in the music. This is a place where the lyric and the music aren't as apposite as they might be, because the important word is "next", and yet the accented word is "year". That's my fault, but [something the performer must] overcome.

Another example arises from Sondheim's roots as a speaker of American rather than British English: The line "Don't you love farce?" features two juxtaposed labiodental fricative sounds (the former [v] voiced, the latter [f] devoiced). American concert and stage performers will often fail to "breathe" and/or "voice" between the two fricatives, leading audiences familiar with British slang to hear "Don't you love arse?", misinterpreting the lyric or at the least perceiving an unintended double entendre. Sondheim agrees that "[i]t's an awkward moment in the lyric, but that v and that f should be separated."

In the line of the fourth verse, "I thought that you'd want what I want. Sorry, my dear," the performer must communicate the connection between the "want" and the "sorry". Similarly, Sondheim insists that performers separately enunciate the adjacent t's in the line, "There ought to be clowns."

== Popular success ==
"Send In the Clowns"

Single by Judy Collins

from the album Judith
- B-side: "Houses"
- Released: May 1975
- Recorded: 1975
- Studio: A&R Recording Studios, New York
- Genre: Pop
- Length: 3:57
- Label: Elektra
- Songwriter: Stephen Sondheim
- Producer: Arif Mardin

The musical and the song debuted on Broadway in 1973. The song became popular with theater audiences, but had not become a pop hit. Sondheim explained how the song became a hit:

First of all, it wasn't a hit for two years. I mean, the first person to sing it was Bobby Short, who happened to see the show in Boston, and it was exactly his kind of song: He's a cabaret entertainer. And then my memory is that Judy Collins picked it up, but she recorded it in England; Sinatra heard it and recorded it. And between the two of them, they made it a hit.

Frank Sinatra recorded "Send in the Clowns" in 1973 for his album Ol' Blue Eyes Is Back, which attained gold status. Gordon Jenkins arranged the song. It was also released as a single. In later versions, he sang it with minimal accompaniment. Sinatra's version plays in the end credits of Todd Phillips' 2019 film Joker.

Two years later Judy Collins recorded "Send in the Clowns" for her album Judith. The song was released as a single, which soon became a major pop hit. It remained on the Billboard Hot 100 for 11 weeks in 1975, reaching Number 36. The single again reached the Billboard Hot 100 in 1977, where it remained for 16 weeks and reached Number 19. At the Grammy Awards of 1976, the Collins performance of the song was named Song of the Year. After Sinatra and Collins recorded the song, it was recorded by Bing Crosby, Kenny Rogers, and Lou Rawls.

Grace Jones recorded a seven-and-a-half minute disco version the song in 1977 as the lead track of her debut album, Portfolio.

David Essex and Twiggy performed the song for the former's BBC TV series in 1977 in character as two clowns removing their make up backstage after a show. The performance concluded with Essex throwing a pie in Twiggy's face.

Olivia Newton-John recorded the song for her 2004 album, Indigo: Women of Song.

In 1985, Sondheim added a verse for Barbra Streisand to use on The Broadway Album and subsequent concert performances. Her version reached No. 25 on the Billboard Hot Adult Contemporary chart in 1986.

The song has become a jazz standard, with performances by Count Basie, Sarah Vaughan, the Stan Kenton Orchestra and many others. It has been recorded by more than 900 singers.

American ambient duo Stars of the Lid for their 2007 album And Their Refinement of the Decline use the melody of "Send In the Clowns" on the track "Don't Bother They're Here", the title itself referencing a line from the song.

In June 2026, CBS News included the song in its list of the 250 essential American songs of the past 250 years.

== Chart history ==
=== Weekly charts ===
Judy Collins

Chart (1975)	Peak position
Australia (Kent Music Report)	13
Canada RPM Adult Contemporary	38
Canada RPM Top Singles	52
Ireland (IRMA)	3
New Zealand (Listener)	23
UK Singles Chart	6
US Billboard Hot 100	36
US Billboard Adult Contemporary	8
US Cash Box Top 100	53

=== Year-end charts ===
Chart (1975)	Rank
Australia (Kent Music Report)	86
UK	85

Chart (1977–1978)	Peak position
Canada RPM Top Singles	15
Canada RPM Adult Contemporary	1
US Billboard Hot 100	19
US Billboard Adult Contemporary	15
US Cash Box Top 100	17

Chart (1977)	Rank
Canada RPM Top Singles	132

Lani Hall

Chart (1984)	Peak position
Canada RPM Adult Contemporary	19
US Billboard Adult Contemporary	18

Barbra Streisand

Chart (1986)	Peak position
Canada RPM Adult Contemporary	2
US Billboard Adult Contemporary	25
