= The Ballasted Orchestra =

Studio album by Stars of the Lid
- Released: March 10, 1997
- Recorded: East Austin, Texas
- Genre: Ambient, drone
- Length: 78:04
- Label: Kranky
- Producer: Adam Wiltzie and Brian McBride

Stars of the Lid chronology
Gravitational Pull vs. the Desire for an Aquatic Life (1996)	The Ballasted Orchestra (1997)	Maneuvering the Nocturnal Hum (1998)

Professional ratings
Review scores
Source	Rating
AllMusic	4/5 stars
Pitchfork Media	(8.5/10)

The Ballasted Orchestra is the third studio album by Stars of the Lid and their first to have its initial release on Kranky. It was released simultaneously as a double LP and a single CD in March 1997. The album features minimal, droning compositions, of varied length, some of which blend into each other. The track "Taphead" is a reference to the Talk Talk song of the same name while "Music for Twin Peaks Episode #30 Part I" and "Part II" are named as a tribute to the cult TV show.

The double vinyl album was out-of-print for years, until a remastered reissue was released by Kranky on January 7, 2013. The LP release contains the bonus track "24 Inch Cymbal" at the end of side A. Additionally, "The Artificial Pine Arch Song" runs 20:52 long on vinyl, as opposed to 18:00 on the CD. This material would not fit on a standard, 80-minute CD.

== Critical reaction ==
The album was generally praised by critics. Stephen Cook, writing for AllMusic, stated: "Taking in such ambient milestones as Brian Eno's Apollo recording, Stars of the Lid's Brian McBride and Adam Wiltzie fashion eight floating gems with touches of industrial noise and movie soundtrack atmospherics. No drums or clanging guitars here, just darkish, elegiac slabs of ethereal sound taking up 12 to 18 minutes at a pop. The overall effect is both calming and provocative."

Writing on its 25th anniversary, music journalist Daryl Worthington wrote that "It’s the sonic antithesis of a life hack, fragments of melody or lush timbral collisions tangling through each other in moves that never seem linear. The music isn’t formless, but it floats atop a spectacularly unsettled ictus.".

== Track listing ==
=== CD release ===
All tracks are written by Adam Wiltzie and Brian McBride.

No.	Title	Length
1.	"Central Texas"	3:43
2.	"Sun Drugs"	12:20
3.	"Down II"	1:22
4.	"Taphead"	12:34
5.	"Fucked Up (3:57 A.M.)"	8:32
6.	"Music for Twin Peaks Episode #30 Part I"	8:01
7.	"Music for Twin Peaks Episode #30 Part II"	13:32
8.	"The Artificial Pine Arch Song"	18:00

=== Double vinyl release ===
Side One
No.	Title	Length
1.	"Central Texas"	3:43
2.	"Sun Drugs"	12:20
3.	"24 Inch Cymbal"	6:01

Side Two
No.	Title	Length
1.	"Down II"	1:22
2.	"Taphead"	12:34
3.	"Fucked Up (3:57 A.M.)"	8:32

Side Three
No.	Title	Length
1.	"Music for Twin Peaks Episode #30 Part I"	8:01
2.	"Music for Twin Peaks Episode #30 Part II"	13:32

Side Four
No.	Title	Length
1.	"The Artificial Pine Arch Song"	18:00
2.	"Untitled" (omitted on vinyl reissues)	2:52
