= Eva Padberg =

German actress, model and singer

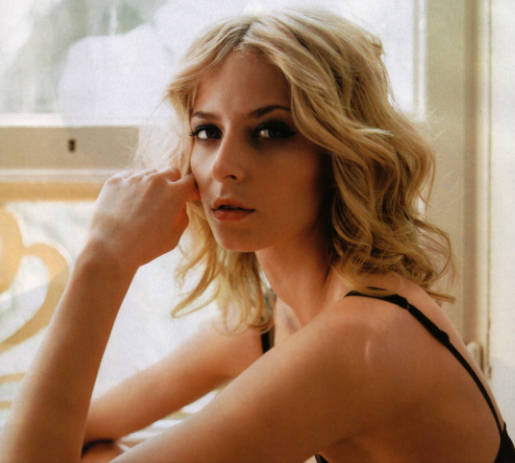
- Eva Padberg in 2005
- Born: 27 January 1980 (age 45); Bad Frankenhausen, Thuringia, East Germany (now Germany)
- Website: www.evapadberg.de

Eva Padberg (born 27 January 1980) is a German fashion model, singer, and actress.

== Early life ==
Padberg was born in Bad Frankenhausen on 27 January 1980 and grew up in Rottleben, which were both part of East Germany until German reunification, which occurred between November 1989 and March 1991. In 1995, she applied for Bravo's Boy & Girl contest; made it among the best ten models and gained the opportunity to do a test shooting for Louisa Models in Munich. In 1998, after having finished her Abitur, she started her professional modelling career. Eva worked in Paris, Tokyo, and New York City, e.g. for Ralph Lauren and Calvin Klein and walked for different Prêt-à-Porter shows.

== Career ==
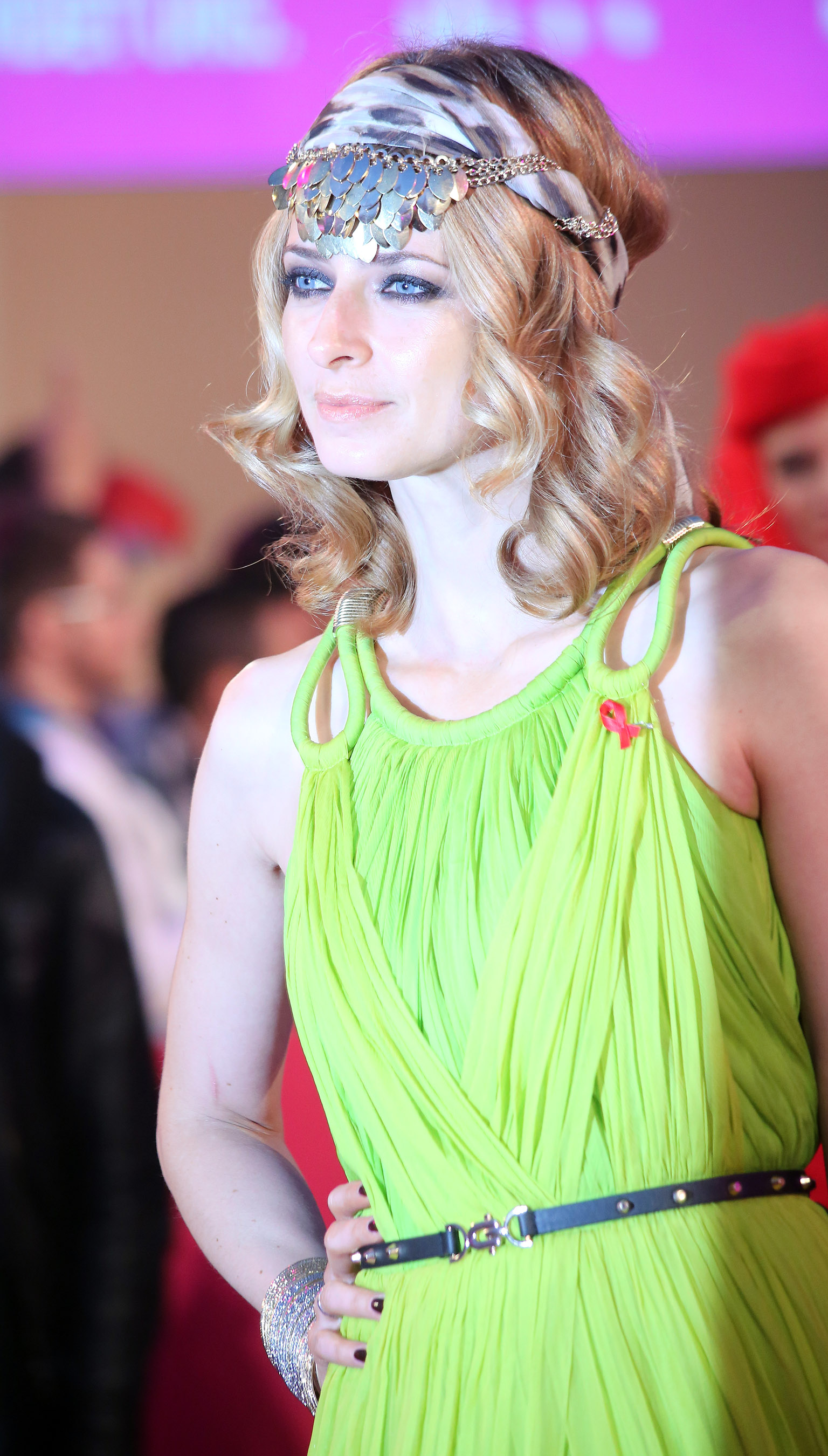
Eva Padberg, Life Ball 2013

Besides the catwalk and the photo shootings, she became a frequently sought model for commercials and advertising campaigns: Since 2003, she has been the face of the make-up-brand Astor. In May 2005, she appeared in the TV commercial of the candy brand "Gletscher Eis" and in September of the same year she became the new face of the Korean automobile manufacturer Kia Motors, but also the new cover top-model of the mail order company Otto and campaign model for Nintendo's Nintendogs. Since May 2006, she has been promoting the new drink "König Pilsener Lemon" of the brand König Pilsener.

In May 2004, Padberg was photographed for the German Playboy by Ellen von Unwerth. In 2005, she was voted "Sexiest Woman of the World" by the readers of FHM and became cover model of the magazine GQ in 2006.

She is also a singer and songwriter of Dapayk & Padberg, an electronic club act, together with her husband Niklas Worgt, they released various singles followed by their first album Close Up in September 2005.

In 2005, she started acting and had minor roles in her debut Maria an Callas (2006) and the film adaptation of the video game In the Name of the King: A Dungeon Siege Tale (2007). She also worked in the jury of Germany's Star Search and, in 2006, as a presenter for the Bambi award of Hubert Burda Media together with talk show host Harald Schmidt.

== Personal life ==
On 29 July 2006, after a relationship of ten years, she married the music producer Niklas Worgt. Padberg is active for numerous charitable projects such as SOS Children's Villages. She has also served as an ambassador for UNICEF. Since May 2007, Eva has also represented Mercedes-Benz as a brand ambassador at international fashion and lifestyle events, including Mercedes-Benz Fashion Week Berlin and Mercedes-Benz Fashion Week Mexico.

In June 2010, she began collaborating with German Fairtrade fashion label armedangels together with Niklas Worgt. Their own t-shirt "Two Hearts – One Rhythm" is sold online.
