= Jonas Reinhardt =

American electronic music producer

Jonas Reinhardt is an American electronic music producer with releases on Kranky, Not Not Fun, and others. Jonas Reinhardt's sound is influenced by electronic music of the 1970s,'80s, '90s and even 2000s, particularly in the use of analog synthesizers and keyboards. His music has taken on numerous forms over the years, starting with the kosmische pulsations of his 2008 eponymous debut before embracing disco rhythms on releases like 2013's Mask of the Maker. After releasing an experimental science fiction soundtrack (Ganymede) in 2014, his studio albums, including 2022's A Ragged Ghost, have resembled cinematic ambient experiences.

== Members ==
- Jesse Reiner

== Past members ==
- John Pamer
- Angus Tarnawsky
- Phil Manley
- Diego Gonzalez
- Warren Huegel
- Damon Palermo

== Discography ==
- "Modern By Nature's Reward EP" (Kranky 2008)
- Jonas Reinhardt (Kranky, 2008)
- Powers of Audition (Kranky, 2010)
- "Manoeuvers 7"" (Kraak, 2011)
- Music for the Tactile Dome (Not Not Fun Records, 2011)
- "The Prime Revealer 12"" (Great Pop Supplement, 2011)
- "Foam Fangs EP" (100% Silk, 2012)
- "Rusting Ciphers of a Forgotten Sky" (VCO Cassettes, 2012)
- Mask of the Maker (Not Not Fun Records, 2013)
- Palace Savant (Further Records, 2015)
- The Encyclopedia of Civilizations Vol. 1: Egypt (w/Jurgen Mueller) (Abstracke Records, 2017)
- Conclave Surge (Deep Distance, 2018)
- Gonzalez & Reinhardt (Stimulus Progression, 2018)
- Gonzalez & Reinhardt: Entropy Brothers (Lucian Lift, 2019)
- A Ragged Ghost (Trouble in Mind, 2022)
