= Per aspera ad astra (disambiguation) =

Per aspera ad astra is a Latin phrase that translates literally as "through asperities (hardships, adversities, rigours) to the stars" and is the motto of many organizations.

Per aspera ad astra may also refer to:

- Per Aspera Ad Astra (1981 film), a Soviet science fiction film
- Per Aspera Ad Astra (2026 film), a Chinese science fiction film
- Per Aspera Ad Astra (album), by Stars of the Lid
- "Per Aspera Ad Astra", a song by the band Die Apokalyptischen Reiter from the album Samurai
- "Per Aspera Ad Astra", a song by the band Fleshgod Apocalypse from the album Opera
- "Per Aspera Ad Astra", a song by the band Haggard from the album Eppur si muove
- "Per Aspera Ad Astra", a song by the band Masterplan from the album Novum Initium
- Per Aspera, a video game
- "Per aspera ad astra", a motto in the book series Red Rising by Pierce Brown
- "Per aspera ad astra", the 13th episode of BanG Dream! Ave Mujica

Ad astra per aspera may refer to:

- Ad Astra per Aspera (band), from Lawrence, Kansas
- Ad Astra per Aspera (album), by Abandon Kansas
- "Ad Astra Per Aspera", a song by Acceptance from the album Phantoms
- Aspera (band), initially known as Aspera ad Astra
- Ad Astra per Aspera (manga), a Japanese manga series by Kenjiro Hata
- "Ad Astra per Aspera" (Star Trek: Strange New Worlds), an episode of the second season of Star Trek: Strange New Worlds
- "Ad Astra per Aspera", official state motto of Kansas

== See also ==
- Per ardua ad astra, "Through adversity to the stars" or "Through struggle to the stars", motto of the Royal Air Force
- Ad astra (disambiguation)
