= Pan American (band) =

American electronic music ensemble

Pan American (often stylized as Pan•American) is an American experimental electronic music ensemble. It is the alter ego of Mark Nelson, vocalist and guitarist for the band Labradford, who first began recording under the name in 1997.

The debut release for Pan American was a self-titled LP on Kranky in 1998. The 2000 LP 360 Business/360 Bypass included appearances from Rob Mazurek and Alan Sparhawk and Mimi Parker of Low. Two further full-lengths on Kranky followed in 2002 and 2004.

Pan American also released White Bird Release (2009), Cloud Room, Glass Room (2013), A Son (2019), and The Patience Fader (2022).

On Cloud Room, Glass Room, Steven Hess was a full-fledged member of Pan American.

== Discography ==
=== Studio albums ===
- Pan American (Kranky, 1998)
- 360 Business/360 Bypass (Kranky, 2000)
- The River Made No Sound (Kranky, 2002)
- Quiet City (Kranky, 2004)
- For Waiting, For Chasing (Mosz Records, 2006)
- White Bird Release (Kranky, 2009)
- Cloud Room, Glass Room (Kranky, 2013)
- A Son (Kranky, 2019)
- The Patience Fader (Kranky, 2022)
- Reverberations of Non-Stop Traffic on Redding Road (with Kramer; Shimmy-Disc, 2024)
- New World, Lonely Ride (with Michael Grigoni; Kranky, 2025)
- Interior of an Edifice Under the Sea (with Kramer; Shimmy-Disc, 2025)

=== Compilation albums ===
- Personal Settings: Preset 1 (with Komet and Fisherofgold; Quatermass Records, 2001)
- Preset 1>>3 (with David Morley, Electric Birds, and Komet; Quatermass Records, 2002)

=== EPs ===
- East Coast Bugs (Quatermass Records, 2001)
- Rue Corridor (Sketch for Winter II) (Geographic North, 2015)
