= Kenneth James Gibson =

Canadian-born American musician

- Born: Kenneth James Gibson; October 8, 1973 (age 53)
- Genres: americana, chamber pop, ambient, avant-garde, dub, folk, noise pop, noise rock, electronica, neo-psychedelia, dancehall, experimental, house, techno
- Occupations: Musician; composer; songwriter; record producer
- Instruments: Guitar; synthesizer; bass guitar; piano; vocals; percussion
- Years active: 1993–present
- Labels: City Slang, Rocket Girl, Kompakt, Southern Records, Trance Syndicate, Burger Records, Adjunct Audio, Trapez, Planet Mu, Mille Plateaux, Tigerbeat 6, Lo Recordings, Warp records
- Website: www.worldofkennethjamesgibson.com

Kenneth James Gibson is a musician, record producer, composer, singer, songwriter and a founding member of Bell Gardens, Furry Things, Eight Frozen Modules, and [a]pendics.shuffle.

== Career ==
Kenneth James Gibson was born in Canada, grew up in El Paso, Texas and currently lives in Los Angeles, California. He first learned how to play guitar on his fathers acoustic and got his first 4-track recorder at age 19. Gibson founded the 1990s noise rock band Furry Things, who released most of its material on King Coffey's (of the Butthole Surfers) Trance Syndicate / Touch and Go Records imprint.

He has also released music that spans across many genres under aliases such as [a]pendics.shuffle, Eight Frozen Modules, dubLoner, Reverse Commuter, and Hiss & Buzz (with Jack Dangers of Meat Beat Manifesto). He founded the electronic music record label Adjunct Audio in early 2005 with friend Konstantin Gabbro, through Kompakt records.

Gibson along with Brian McBride of the drone-based ambient music duo Stars of the Lid, started the band Bell Gardens in 2009. Through the music of Bell Gardens, the two explore the realms of Americana, chamber pop, folk, and psychedelic pop. He also recently collaborated with Douglas McCarthy of Nitzer Ebb on a track called Whispers In on his latest Reverse Commuter album titled Exposure. In April 2016, Gibson released his first full ambient album under his real name titled The Evening Falls on Kompakt Records and returned for a second album in March, 2018 titled In The Fields Of Nothing.

In 2017, Gibson started the band Toler Gibson with Gavin Toler Of The Winter Flowers. According to his website the group makes music that fits under the “Cosmic American Music” banner.

In 2021 Gibson started a new record label called Meadows Heavy Recorders. This is also the name of his studio in Idyllwild, Ca. 2022 saw the release of his 3rd ambient and experimental album titled Groundskeeping under his given name on his new label. Later in 2022 he also released a guitar based drone album titled Ssih Mountain. 2023 saw the release of the remix album Further Translations featuring remixes by artists such as Jack Dangers, Scanner, Brian McBride, Christopher Willits, and others.

In 2024 Gibson collaborated with saxophonist Paul Carman on an album titled Murals For Immersion which was released on Important Records. Paul Carman is most known for being the saxophonist on recordings and tours with Frank Zappa in what Zappa called The Best Band You Never Heard In Your Life In 2025 Gibson joined forces with artists Marine Eyes and James Bernard to form the ambient post-rock band Almost An Island. The trio released their self-titled debut album on the label Past Inside The Present.

He has directed music videos for artists such as Francis Harris and Dance Spirit as well as his own projects Reverse Commuter and Bell Gardens.

== Musical projects ==
=== Furry Things ===
Gibson played guitar, sang, and produced the 1990s Noise Pop band Furry Things. The line up also consisted of Cathy Shive (Bass, Vocals), Charlie Woodburn (Drums), and Chris Michaels (Keyboards). Furry Things released the majority of its material on King Coffey's (of the Butthole Surfers) Trance Syndicate / Touch and Go Records imprint. The band formed in Austin, Texas in 1993 and moved to Los Angeles, California in the summer of 1997.

Gibson produced the band's first LP titled The Big Saturday Illusion along with engineer Adam Wiltzie (of Stars Of The Lid). Gibson and Brad Laner (of the band Medicine) produced the second and last LP titled Moments Away which was released in 1998. The band also released two 7" singles and two EPs as well as being featured on The Kahanek Incident: Volume 2, which was a remix trade between Furry Things and Electric Company.

=== Bell Gardens ===
Bell Gardens is the musical collaboration between Gibson and Brian McBride of Stars Of The Lid. Through the music of Bell Gardens, they explore different styles such as chamber pop, folk rock, psychedelic pop, and Americana. Their first EP Hangups Need Company was released on their own imprint Failed Better in 2010. Southern Records released their first LP Full Sundown Assembly in late 2012. Rocket Girl released the band's second LP titled Slow Dawns For Lost Conclusions in October, 2014.

=== Eight Frozen Modules ===
Eight Frozen Modules (also known as 8FM) is one of Gibson's experimental electronic music projects. Eight Frozen Modules' recorded material is a mix of IDM, Techno, Dub, electro, breakcore, dancehall, and Noise. The project started as a side project to the now defunct noise-pop band Furry Things and like Furry Things, was also released on King Coffey's Trance Syndicate label. As 8FM, he has released music on labels such as Phthalo, Planet Mu, Orthlorng Musork, Tigerbeat 6, City Slang, Shockout, Mutant Sniper, Mille Plateaux, Warp, In Vitro Records, Lo Recordings and Tino Corp to name a few.

=== [a]pendics.shuffle ===
[a]pendics.shuffle is Gibson's main electronic music alias. Under this alias he creates a mix of minimal house, techno, micro house, and experimental electronic dance music. [a]pendics.shuffle has released music on many labels such as Trapez, Orac, Adjunct Audio, Mo's Ferry Prod., Lick My Deck, We Are, Leftroom, Sunset Diskos and more. As apendics.shuffle, Gibson has collaborated with and remixed a number of other artists such Mr. C of The Shamen, Mikael Stavöstrand, Mark "Blakkat" Bell, Damian Lazarus, Brad Laner, and Vladislav Delay.

=== dubLoner ===
dubLoner is a dub project from Gibson. Dubloner's output ranges from deep and spacious dub techno and house to more rootsy dirty dub experiments. He has, as Dubloner, remixed and collaborated artists such as Meat Beat Manifesto, Jack Dangers (a duo of dubLoner and Jack Dangers called Hiss & Buzz), Isaac Haile Selassie, Kool Keith, and Markus Nikolai of Perlon Records.

=== Reverse Commuter ===
The first released Reverse Commuter track, The Organ That Killed Me, was released on a compilation titled Grand Slang on City Slang in 2000. There was a gap of no releases till 2003 with The Direction EP on Hallucination Recordings. Outside of a string of remixes and compilation tracks, there wasn't another official release till 2014 with a new album titled Exposure on DJ Three's Hallucienda label along with a 12" EP titled Vinyl Exposure One including a Doc Martin remix. Exposure featured tracks with vocals by Gibson, Douglas McCarthy (of Nitzer Ebb, Recoil), and his wife Kelly Johnston-Gibson.

== Adjunct Audio ==
Gibson along with Konstantin Gabbro (also co-founder of Orac Records, Zoombézoom) founded the electronic music record label Adjunct Audio in 2005. Adjunct releases a range of styles from deep house and minimal techno to dub and ambient. Producers such as John Tejada, Bruno Pronsato, Dapayk, Blakkat, Kit Clayton, Mathias Schaffhäuser, DubLoner, Sutekh, Dilo, Mikael Stavostrand, Mr. C, and [a]pendics.shuffle himself have worked with the label. Adjunct is distributed by Kompakt records.

== Music for television and film ==
Gibson composes music for television and film, including shows such as Shameless, The Simpsons, The Last O.G., Weeds, Californication, and Saturday Night Live and films such as Relay, Christy, The Best and the Brightest, Drones, Don Peyote, and 7 Minutes. Gibson appeared as himself as music producer on an episode of VH1's MC Serch hosted show Miss Rap Supreme.

== Discography ==
=== with Bell Gardens ===
Albums

- Full Sundown Assembly (Southern Records / Burger Records, 2012)
- Slow Dawns For Lost Conclusions (Rocket Girl, 2014)

Singles & EPs

- Hangups Need Company (Failed Better / Burger Records, 2010)
- Take Us Away (Rocket Girl, 2014)

Compilation appearances

- Various – International Connection Collection (Dublab, 2010)
- Various - The Kitty Comp (Burger Records, 2010)
- Various - Rocket Girl 20 (Rocket Girl, 2019)

=== with Furry Things ===
Albums

- The Big Saturday Illusion (Trance Syndicate, 1995)
- Moments Away (Trance Syndicate, 1998)

Singles & EPs

- Hide / Your Two One (7") (Rise Records, 1994)
- Still California / Car Songs Unlimited (7") (Trance Syndicate, 1995)
- Headphones (Trance Syndicate, 1996)
- Frequent Lunacy (Trance Syndicate, 1997)

Compilation appearances

- Various – Cinco Años! (Trance Syndicate, 1995)
- Various – Green Light GO! (Bottlecap Records, 1995)
- Various – Angelfood Electronics Vol Two (Kakemix Records, 1997)
- Various – Letters To Aliens (Undercover Inc., 1997)

=== as Kenneth James Gibson ===
Albums

- Delusional Tales And Non-Silence (Culprit, 2010)
- The Evening Falls (Kompakt, 2016)
- In The Fields Of Nothing (Kompakt, 2018)
- Groundskeeping (Meadows Heavy Recorders, 2022)
- Ssih Mountain (Meadows Heavy Recorders, 2022)
- Further Translations (Meadows Heavy Recorders, 2023)

Singles & EPs

- Animals Tonight (Culprit, 2009)
- Something In The Way (Culprit, 2010)
- Something In The Way Remixes (12") (Adjunct Audio, 2013)
- Far From Home (Kompakt, 2018)

Compilation appearances

- Various - Ambient Rounds Vol. 2 (Dock Records, 2014)
- Various - Pop Ambient 2017 (Kompakt, 2016)
- Various - Pop Ambient 2018 (Kompakt, 2017)
- Various - Velvet Desert Music Vol. 1 (Kompakt, 2019)

=== as Kenneth James Gibson And Paul Carman ===
Albums

- Murals For Immersion (Important Records, 2024)

=== as Eight Frozen Modules ===
Albums

- The Confused Designer (Trance Syndicate, 1997)
- The Confused Electrician (City Slang, 1998)
- Random Activities and Broken Sunsets (Phthalo, 2001)
- Thought Process Disorder (Orthlorng Musork, 2002)
- The Abduction of Barry (Orthlorng Musork, 2003)
- Crumbling And Responding (g25productions, 2005)
- Clinically Yours (Plateaux Résistance, 2005)

Singles & EPs

- Daydream Nightmare (12") (Trance Syndicate, 1997)
- Collages From The Inside of a Circuit Board Gone Wild (12") (Kakemix Records, 1997)
- Eight Frozen Modules / Mochipet – $ Vol. 11 (7") (Tigerbeat6, 2003)
- DJ, Riddim & Source (12") (Planet Mu, 2004)
- Ghislain Poirier / Eight Frozen Modules – Be Strong / Dem Nuh Know Me (12") (Shockout / Tigerbeat6, 2004)
- Rejected Resident (12") (Mutant Sniper, 2005)
- Deleted Chemistry (12") (In Vitro Records, 2008)

Compilation appearances

- Various – Wow! & Flutter (City Slang / Too Pure, 1997)
- Various – Musikexpress 14 – EFA (Musikexpress, 1998)
- Various – Altered States of America (Lo Recordings, 1998)
- Various – Shockout (Shockout / Tigerbeat6, 2004)
- Various – Igloo Trax Vol. 1 (Igloo Magazine, 2004)
- Various – Drop Name Records Vol. 1 (Painfree Foundsound Institute, 2004)
- Various – Clicks & Cuts 4 (Mille Plateaux, 2004)
- Various – Crimson (Terminal Dusk, 2005)
- Various – Autonomous Addicts (The Designed Disorder, 2005)
- Various – Morrow Choral Orchestra (The Designed Disorder, 2006)
- Surgeon – This Is For You Shits (Warp Records, 2007)

Selected remixes

- Bruno Pronsato – Silver City (Eight Frozen Modules Remix) (Orac, Records, 2003)
- Meat Beat Manifesto – God O.D. (Eight Ways To O.D. On God Mix) (Tino Corp, 2003
- Daedelus – Cuts Like An Axe (Eight Frozen Modules Remix) (Phthalo, 2006)

=== as [a]pendics.shuffle ===
Albums

- Helicopter Hearts (Orac Records, 2005)
- Aware Sequence Found Life (Adjunct Audio, 2016)
- Aware Sequence Found Life (Remixes) (Adjunct Audio, 2017)

Singles & EPs

- Smooth Hair (12" / CD) (Proptronix, 2004)
- The Lavender Neglect (12") (Orac Records, 2004)
- The Diligent Puzzle (12") (Narita Records, 2004)
- Real People (12") (Mineral Musica, 2005)
- Paradroid / [a]pendics.shuffle – Unclassified Computer Funk (12") (Orac Records, 2005)
- Saw Saw Soup (12") (Orac Records, 2005)
- Framed And Defamed (12") (Sunset Diskos, 2006)
- Eloquent Milk (12") (Leftroom, 2006)
- Rampant Passenger (12") (Mo's Ferry Prod., 2006)
- [a]pendics.shuffle & Mikael Stavöstrand – Looking For Me (12") (Adjunct Audio, 2006)
- Group Trivia (12") (Persistencebit Records, 2006)
- [a]pendics.shuffle & Altiply – Lonely Payback (12") (Adjunct Audio, 2006)
- She's Got Moves (12") (Friends of Tomorrow, 2006)
- Re-Fried Monument (12") (Budenzauber Recordings, 2006)
- Hot Guardian & The Freestyle Formula (12") (Adjunct Audio, 2007)
- Sammy Baker Davis Jr. (12") (Mo's Ferry Prod, 2007)
- Paradroid / [a]pendics.shuffle – Unclassified Computer Funk 2 (12") (Orac Records, 2007)
- [a]pendics.shuffle & Mikael Stavöstrand – Take Me Higher (12") (Adjunct Audio, 2007)
- You Got My Harmony (12") (Mo's Ferry prod., 2008)
- Elegance & Malice (12") (Lick My Deck, 2008)
- Mas Lines (12") (Ransom Note Footnote, 2008)
- Mass Reduction (12") (Adjunct Audio, 2008)
- Elegance & Malice Reworked (12") (Lick My Deck, 2009)
- [a]pendics.shuffle & Dilo – Vaquero (12") (Trapez, 2010)
- Restless And Disturbed, Songs of Mania (Digital) (Persistencebit Records, 2010)
- I See The Morning Time (12") (Mo's Ferry prod., 2011)
- [a]pendics.shuffle + Mr. C – Something Strange (12") (Adjunct Audio, 2012)
- [a]pendics.shuffle + Mr. C – Something Strange Part 2 (12") (Adjunct Audio, 2012)
- Mikael Stavöstrand & [a]pendics.shuffle – Midnight Machines (12") (Adjunct Audio, 2013)
- [a]pendics.shuffle & Dilo – Wonderfully Drifting (12") (Mo's Ferry Prod., 2013)
- [a]pendics.shuffle Ft. Blakkat – Heavy Burdens High (12") (Adjunct Audio, 2013)
- [a]pendics.shuffle Ft. Bryan Black – Fall From Grace (Digital) (Adjunct Audio, 2014)

Compilation appearances

- Various – Wighnomy Brothers | Robag Wruhme* – Remikks Potpourri (Mute Tonträger, 2005)
- Various – Bits To Phono Mix (Mo's Ferry Prod., 2006)
- Various – Unhappy Anniversary V.2 (Unfoundsound, 2006)
- Various – Summership Vol. 1 (ZYX Music, 2006)
- Various – Do You Copy? (Mitek, 2006)
- Various – Best of 2007 – Minimal Edition (Gastspiel recordings, 2007)
- Various – Communication Defines Culture Volume 2 (Conversations Records, 2007)
- Various – From Minimal To Techno 2 (Gastspiel Recordings, 2008)
- Various – Mo's Ferry Flipside Compilation (Mo's Ferry Prod., 2009)
- Various – For Every Moment of Triumph: Volume One (Adjunct Audio, 2011)
- Various – For Every Moment Of Triumph: Volume Two (Adjunct Audio, 2011)
- Various – Mo's Ferry Great Cinema Show (Mo's Ferry Prod., 2011)
- Various – Selected Remixes: Volume One Compilation (Adjunct Audio, 2012)
- Various – Warenkorb #6 (Ware, 2012)
- Various – For Every Moment Of Triumph: Volume Three (Adjunct Audio, 2013)

Selected remixes

- Mochipet – Disco Donkey ([a]pendics.shuffle Mix) (Daly City Recordings, 2006)
- Drumcell – Brain Wreck ([a]pendics.shuffle Remix) (Droid Recordings, 2006)
- Le K – Ok Daddy ([a]pendics.shuffle's Dirty Fingers Mix) (Feinwerk, 2007)
- Evan Marc – Iris ([a]pendics.shuffle Remix) (Thoughtless Music, 2007)
- Mathias Schaffhäuser – Gott Ist Tot ([a]pendics.shuffle Remix) (Ware, 2007)
- Dilo & Gurtz – Ave Fenix ([a]pendics.shuffle Sub For Hubs Remix) (LesIzmo:r, 2007)
- Adultnapper – Fluorescent ([a]pendics.shuffle Remix) (Ransom Note Footnote, 2008)
- Brad Laner – From Inside ([a]pendics.shuffle's Out Side-In Remix) (Adjunct Audio, 2009)
- Vladislav Delay As Sistol – Haaska (Swelter Mix By [a]pendics.shuffle) (Haylo Cyan Records, 2010)
- Damian Lazarus / [a]pendics.shuffle – Smoke The Monster Out – Club Versions (Get Physical Music, 2010)
- Akiko Kiyama – Queen Momo ([a]pendics.shuffle's Wall of Trumpets Remix) (Adjunct Audio, 2010)
- Miro Pajic – Full of Emptiness ([a]pendics Shuffle Full of Dung Remix) (Lazerslut Recordings, 2011)
- Joint Custody – Lights & Buttons ([a]pendics.shuffle Remix) (Superfreq Records, 2013)

=== with Electronic Music Composer ===
Albums

- Abandon Music (Planet Mu, 2005)

Singles & EP's

- Suggested Surgery / Wretched Idea (7", Single) (Planet Mu, 2002)

Compilation appearances

- Shiro The Goodman – Dance Crazy, Till A Meal Gets Rotten (ROMZ, 2003)
- Various – Children of Mu (Planet Mu, 2004)

=== as dubLoner ===
Albums

- Polycubist vs. Dubloner – Selecta One (Skor Records, 2005)
- Devious Heads (Adjunct Audio, 2009)
- A Loner's Sway (Adjunct Audio, 2009)

Singles & EPs

- Dubloner / Polycubist – Selector (12") (Skor Records, 2002)
- Devious Turnip (12") (Headinghome Recordings, 2004)
- Foreign Sway (12") (Headinghome Recordings, 2004)
- Jack Dangers Meets Dubloner (as Hiss & Buzz ) – Hiss & Buzz (12") (Skor Records, 2005)
- To J's Head (12") (Skor Records, 2005)
- A Loner's Way (12") (Headinghome Recordings, 2006)
- Impact Dub Feat. Isaac H. Selassie (split 12") (De'fchild Productions, 2008)
- DubLoner & Isaac Haile Selassie – Wicked Man (12") (De'fchild Productions, 2010)
- DubLoner & Isaac H. Selassie* – The Fight, The Spirit (12") (De'fchild Productions, 2010)
- Dubloner Ft. Isaac Haile Selassie - Chairr Nawena (digital EP) (Adjunct Audio, 2015)

Compilation appearances

- Various – For Every Moment of Triumph: Volume Two (Adjunct Audio, 2011)

Selected Remixes

- Reverse Commuter – The Direction – Re:Directed (dubLoner Remix) (Hallucination Limited, 2003)
- Meat Beat Manifesto – Retrograde Pt. 2 Dub We R 1 (Dubloner Remix) (Tino Corp, 2004)
- Markus Nikolai – Mr. Big Star (Dubloner's Big Mix) (Headinghome Recordings, 2005)
- Lucid Dream (John Tejada) – Chortle (dubLoner: no minutes left Remix) (Phthalo, 2009)
- Asyncron – Vogelsang (Dubloner's Lessons In Love Mix) (Dock Records, 2012)

=== as Kenneth James G ===
Singles & EPs

- Your Condition (12") (Resopal Red, 2006)
- Removing Me (12") (Underl_ne, 2007)

=== as KJ Gibbs ===
Singles & EPs

- Messages (12") (Floppy Funk, 2006)
- Never Taint You In MY Eyes (12") (LesIzmo:r, 2007)
- Fenin & KJ Gibbs – It Hurtz (12") (RARE, 2007)
- Outlaw Appreciation (12") (Titbit Music, 2007)
- Bass Up in The MIx (Adjunct Audio, 2010)
- There's A Whole In My Mental Body (12") (Fragmented Audio, 2010)

Compilation appearances

- Various – Temporary Construct (Minlove, 2006)
- Various – Bicycles Are Your Friends (Peloton Musique, 2008)

=== as Premature Wig ===
Singles & EPs

- Endless Dub (12") (Skor Records, 2003)
- With Me (12") (Disco Inc., 2005)
- Give It Up (12") (Skor Records, 2005)
- Place Detection (12") (Force Tracks, 2006)

Compilation appearances

- Various – Hypersex Code. 1 (Disco Inc., 2005)
- Various – Digital Disco 3 (Force Tracks, 2006)

Remixes

- Ryan Craig – Believe (The Premature Wig Sideways Shuffle Mix) (12") (Headinghome Recordings, 2004)
- Igor O. Vlasov – Our Home (Premature Wig Remix) (12") (Force Tracks, 2006)

=== as Bal Cath ===
Albums

- A Wonderful Collection Of Fucks Given (Adjunct Audio, 2014)

Singles & EP's

- Bal Cath / Hawkeye – El Disco Acido (12") (Headinghome Recordings, 2004)
- Bal Cath / Hawkeye – El Disco Acido 2 (12") (Headinghome Recordings, 2005)
- El Disco Acido 3 (12") (Headinghome Recordings, 2005)

Compilation appearances

- Acid Condenser 2005.01 (Molecular Funk Guerilla, 2005)

=== as Reverse Commuter ===
Albums

- Exposure (Hallucienda, 2014)

Singles & EP's

- The Direction (12") (Hallucination Limited, 2003)
- Vinyl Exposure One (12") (Hallucienda, 2014)

Compilation appearances

- Various – Grand Slang (City Slang, 2000)
- Various – Hallucination Limited Presents: Three : Hallucienda (System Recordings, 2005)
- Various – For Every Moment of Triumph: Volume Three (Adjunct, 2013)
- Various – Km5 Ibiza Volumen 13 (Kontor Records, 2013)
- Various - Phono Obscura (Hallucienda, 2014)

Selected Remixes

- Beautiful Confusion – In My Mind (Reverse Commuter remix) (Hallucination, 2004)
- Vita – Dig Down (Reverse Commuter's Down Deeper Mix) (Adjunct Audio, 2010)
- Douglas J. McCarthy – Hey (Reverse Commuter Mix) (Shaboom Black, 2012)
- [a]pendics.shuffle Ft. Blakkat – Heavy Burdens High (Reverse Commuter's Full Vocal Mix Up) (Adjunct Audio, 2013)
- Blakkat - Epic Feel (Reverse Commuter Remix) (Shaboom, 2014)

=== with Cascabel Gentz ===
Singles & EP's

- The Pressure of It All (12") (We Are, 2009)
- Dirty Lips (12") (Einmaleins Musik, 2009)
- Electric High (12") (Mo's Ferry Prod., 2011)

Compilation appearances

- Various – For Every Moment of Triumph: Volume One (Adjunct Audio, 2011)

=== with Men In Slippers ===
Singles & EPs

- Anything From Here (12") (Resopal Schallware, 2008)
- Ultra Necessity / Falling Apart (10") (MiniSketch, 2008)

Remixes

- Jorge Savoretti & Seuil Fatissimo (Men In Slippers "Housecoats" Remix) (Igloo-rec, 2008)

=== with Whoa Buck ===
Singles & EPs

- South Of South Pole (Sunset Diskos, 2010)

Compilation appearances

- Various – Icarian Games And Indian Clubs Volume One (Adjunct Audio, 2009)

Remixes

- Wig Water Magic – House Marque (Whoa Buck's "Double Parked Spaceship" Remix) (Adjunct Audio, 2010)
