= Felix (band) =

British musical group

- Origin: Nottingham, England
- Genres: Chamber pop
- Years active: 2007–2012
- Labels: Kranky; Low Point
- Members: Lucinda Chua; Chris Summerlin
- Past members: Elvis Beetham; Neil Turpin
- Website: felix-uk.bandcamp.com

Felix were a British chamber pop musical group from Nottingham. They released two albums: You Are the One I Pick (2009) and Oh Holy Molar (2012).

== History ==
Lucinda Chua met Chris Summerlin, a guitarist of the band Lords, in 2004. After Chua gave Summerlin a CD of home recordings she had made, they began making music together and formed Felix. Chua toured with the band Stars of the Lid, as a member of the string section.

Felix's debut album, You Are the One I Pick, was released in 2009 through Kranky. They were joined by drummer Elvis Beetham. The album met positive feedback from AllMusic, BBC Music, Cokemachineglow, Drowned in Sound, and Pitchfork.

Felix released the second album, Oh Holy Molar, in 2012 through the same label. They were joined by drummer Neil Turpin. The album met positive feedback from Beats Per Minute, PopMatters, and Spin.

== Members ==
- Lucinda Chua – vocals, piano, cello
- Chris Summerlin – guitar, percussion

=== Past members ===
- Elvis Beetham – drums
- Neil Turpin – drums

== Discography ==
=== Albums ===
- You Are the One I Pick (Kranky, 2009)
- Oh Holy Molar (Kranky, 2012)

=== Singles ===
- "What I Learned from TV" (split with Chris Herbert; Low Point, 2007)
