= Armedangels =

Fashion label from Germany

Social Fashion Company GmbH
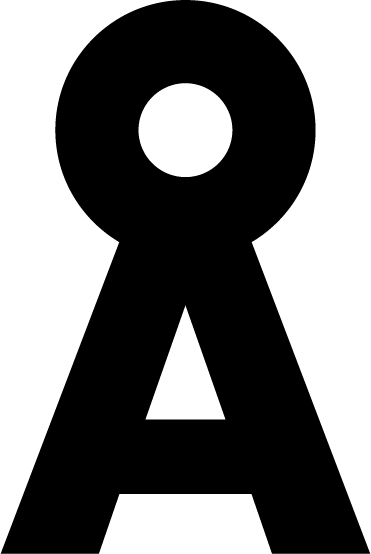
- Company type: Private (GmbH)
- Founded: January 2007; 19 years ago
- Headquarters: Cologne, {{{location_country}}}
- Founders: Anton Jurina; Martin Höfeler
- Key people: Martin Hoefeler
- Industry: Clothing
- Revenue: € 35 million
- Website: www.armedangels.com

Armedangels is a fashion label based in Cologne, Germany, founded in 2007. The company is known for its focus on sustainable and responsible practices in fashion, including its use of certified materials, supply chain transparency, and fair labor standards.

== History ==
The company was founded in January 2007 as Social Fashion Company GmbH by two friends, Anton Jurina and Martin Höfeler. In 2009, the founders won the first ever Wirtschaftswoche Entrepreneur Competition (German language: Gründerwettbewerb der Wirtschaftswoche) for their business model.

It has since grown into a European fashion label, selling through its online store and selected retailers, and has integrated social and environmental themes into its public campaigns. In 2020, Armedangels reported an annual turnover number of €35 million.

In 2021, the company was recognized by the Thomson Reuters Foundation’s Stop Slavery Award for its ethical sourcing and labor policies.

In 2024, the "Sleep ’til Infinna™" pajama set won the German Ecodesign Award for circular product innovation and the "Paulilaa Lino Heavy Blazer" received PETA Germany’s Vegan Fashion Award for Best Vegan Blazer.

In 2025, it collaborated with artist Eike König on the "Democracy" capsule collection to encourage civic engagement. Profits supported voter participation campaigns. The company also created a limited-edition T-shirt with SOS Humanity and artist GABE raised awareness of refugee safety in the Mediterranean. Proceeds supported SOS Humanity’s rescue efforts.

== Collaborations ==
Armedangels partners with several other fashion labels such as: Kuyichi, Terra Plana, Stewart & Brown, Fresh Cuts and KnowledgeCotton Apparel. At the end of 2009, the label began a collaboration with German actress Cosma Shiva Hagen. In June 2010 the fashion label teamed up with German Top model Eva Padberg and her husband Niklas Worgt. They designed their own t-shirt "Two Hearts - One Rhythm" which is sold online.

For a special autumn campaign in 2024 the company worked together with actor Frederick Lau and the german singer Joy Denalane.
