= Christopher Bissonnette =

Canadian musician and multimedia artist

Christopher Bissonnette is a Canadian electronic musician and multimedia artist from Windsor, Ontario.

Bissonnette studied at the University of Windsor and founded the art collective Thinkbox in 1997. The collective, composed of six members, released a compilation entitled Settings; other members include Mark Laliberte and Chris McNamara. Bisonnette released his first album of audio material, Periphery, in 2005 on Kranky Records. Several further albums followed on Kranky.

== Discography ==
- Periphery (Kranky Records, 2005)
- In Between Words (Kranky, 2007)
- The Banal and the Profound (Chat Blanc, 2010)
- The Meridians of Longitude and Parallels of Latitude with David Wenngren (Home Normal, 2011)
- Essays in Idleness (Kranky, 2014)
- Pitch, Paper & Foil (Kranky, 2015)
- Wayfinding (12k, 2020)
- In A Second Floor Window (12k, 2020)
