= Less Bells =

American instrumentalist and vocalist

Less Bells is the stage name of Julie Carpenter, a multi-instrumentalist and vocalist. She moved to Joshua Tree, California from Los Angeles, California.

Prior to starting the Less Bells project, Carpenter worked with (performed, recorded, and/or composed) with The Autumns, Eels, Kenneth James Gibson, and The Brian Jonestown Massacre. Carpenter signed with Kranky in 2018 and released Solifuge, an album of electroacoustic music evoking the landscape of the Joshua Tree area. In an interview with RTÉ, Carpenter described her music as "Electro Orchestral soundtracks for alternate universe Jodorowsky films about heroic but doomed women". A sophomore follow-up for Kranky, Mourning Jewelry, arrived in August 2020.

== Discography ==
- Solifuge (Kranky, 2018)
- Mourning Jewelry (Kranky, 2020)
- The Drowned Ground (Meadows Heavy Recorders, 2023)
