= Adjunct Audio =

American electronic music record label

Adjunct Audio is an electronic music record label based in Los Angeles, California. It was founded in 2005 by Kenneth James Gibson AKA [a]pendics.shuffle and Konstantin Gabbro and is distributed by Kompakt. Adjunct releases a range of styles from deep house and minimal techno to dub and ambient. Producers such as John Tejada, Bruno Pronsato, Dapayk, Blakkat, Kit Clayton, Mathias Schaffhäuser, DubLoner, Sutekh, Dilo, Mikael Stavostrand, Mr. C, and [a]pendics.shuffle himself have worked with the label.
