= Mr. C =

English DJ (born 1965)

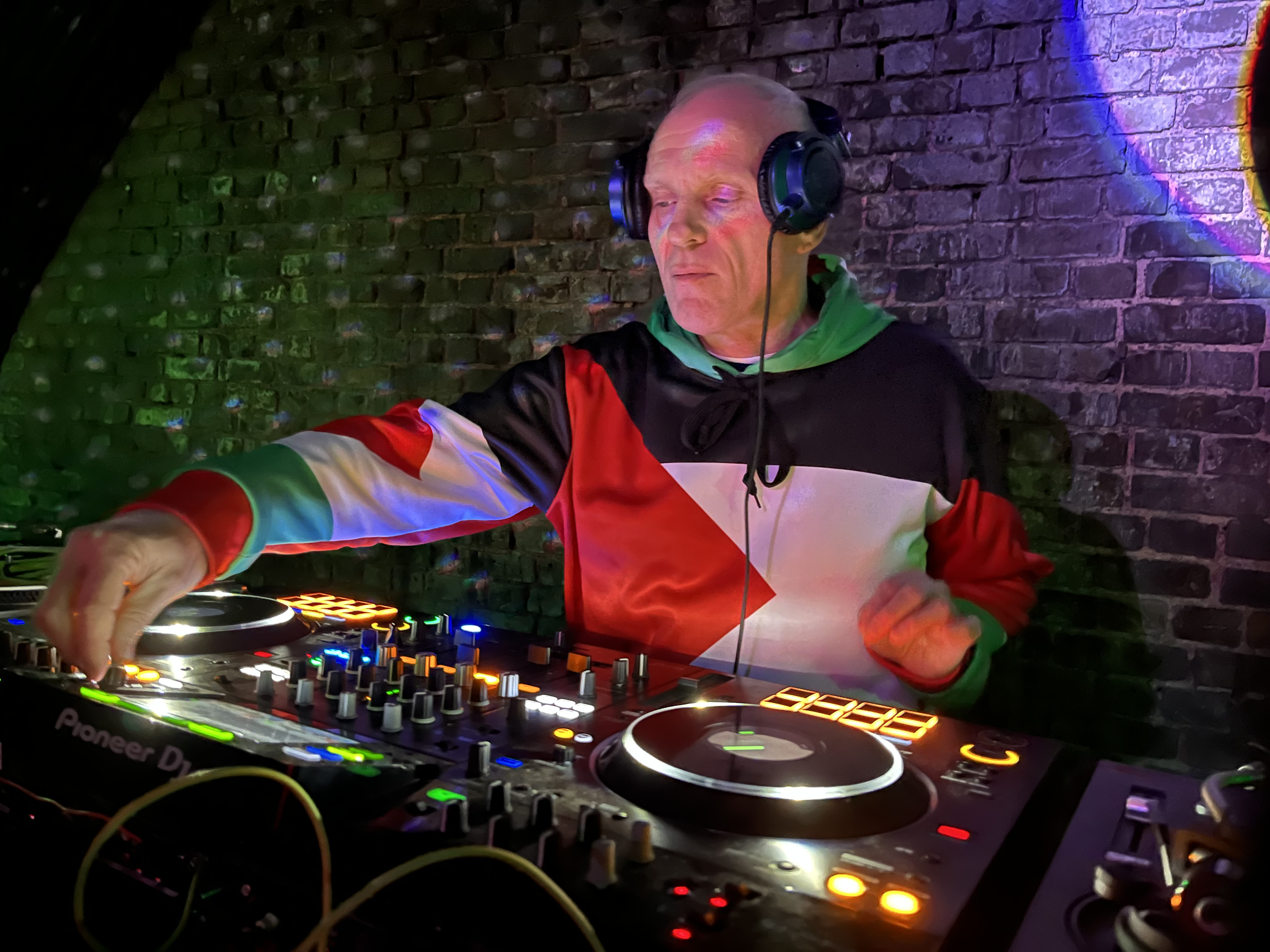
- Mr. C in 2025

Background information
- Also known as: East LA Tek, Sycophant Slags, Indigo Kidz
- Born: Richard West; 2 January 1965 (age 61); Mile End, London
- Origin: Holloway, London, England
- Genres: House, electronic, dub, tech house
- Occupations: Singer, rapper, record producer, DJ, actor
- Years active: 1987–present
- Labels: Superfreq, Get Physical Music, Poker Flat, Adjunct Audio, Wagon Repair

Richard West (born 2 January 1965), known as Mr. C, is an English house music DJ, producer and rapper. He was the resident DJ at the early acid house "RIP" nights at Clink Street, London, and later was the co-owner/co-founder of London's The End nightclub.

West was the frontman for The Shamen during their most commercially successful era. He is a proponent of tech house, a fusion of house and techno music.

== Career ==
West was born in London in 1965. He started MCing in the London clubs aged 16 and earned a reputation as a fast-talking, vivacious rapper working with LWR radio's Ron Tom, Jasper the Vinyl Junkie and Jazzy M. He joined with Colin Faver and Evil Eddie Richards to become resident rapper at Camden Palace. West recorded his first deep house track with Eddie Richards as Myster-E, "Page 67", which was released in August 1987.

This inspired West to become a DJ in late 1987. He has since organised, promoted and been resident DJ at: Fantasy (1988), Base (Dungeons 1989), Release (1991), Harmony (1992), Drop (1993), Cyclone (1994), Vapourspace (1994 and 1995), Flavour (The End, 1995 and 1996), Subterrain (The End, 1995–2002), Superfreq (worldwide 2002–present) and Super Disco Freq (LA, 2010–present).

In December 1995 West opened the night club The End in London with Partner Layo Paskin (of Layo & Bushwacka!) and AKA bar three years later, which had its 23rd anniversary in December 2018. West is founder and owner of Plink Plonk records, co-founder of End Recordings and co-founder and owner of the Superfreq label.

He has recorded under the names Myster-E, Unity 2, Nu Jacks, Bass Bureau, Mantrac, Somnambulist, Animus Amour, Killer Loop, Mr. C and Tom Parris, Mr. C and 16B and the Sycophant Slags. West is best known as frontman of The Shamen with whom he achieved a string of top 10 hits including "Move Any Mountain" and the UK number 1 hit "Ebeneezer Goode". In 1995 he created the mix album Fantazia DJ Collection 3 – Back to the Old Skool.

He has also released mix albums Psycotrance vol 1, X-Mix 6 on Studio K7, Sunterrain 100% Unreleased on his End recordings imprint and most recently Superfreq Express on his Superfreq label. West now records solo as Mr. C and collaborates as the Sycophant Slags with Francis Harris aka Adultnapper, as the Indigo Kidz with Affie Yusuf, with [a]pendics.shuffle and with Omid 16b.

He has released on Poker Flat, Wagon Repair Records, Get Physical Music and Adjunct Audio. He has released a solo EP titled "I'm gonna Give You Some" and the albums Smell The Coffee and Incidents. He has collaborated with Affie Yusuf, Omid 16b and [a]pendics.shuffle. He has remixed for Mikael Stavöstrand and David Scuba, Francis Harris, Xo Chic, Joint Custody & Affie Yusuf. His "Soulfuric" track was released on Alola and his "Liquid Acid" track was released on DJ Pierre's Acid 88 album on Afro Acid.

=== Superfreq record label ===
Superfreq released eight EPs from various artists and one mix-set by Mr. C, but had then been a dormant record label since 2006. Superfreq relaunched in February 2013 and has since released prolifically with forty digital EPs and two albums.

== Personal life ==
West is married to the Mexican actress and model Xochitl Marbach.

== General references ==
- Bainbridge, Luke (2014). The True Story of Acid House: Britain's Last Youth Culture Revolution. London: Omnibus Press. ISBN 978-1-7803-8734-5.
- Collin, Matthew (2009). Altered State: The Story of Ecstasy Culture and Acid House. London: Serpent's Tails. ISBN 978-0-7535-0645-5.
- Reynolds, Simon (1998). Energy Flash: A Journey Through Rave Music and Dance Culture. London: Faber and Faber. ISBN 978-0-5712-8913-4.
- Shulman, Alon (2019). The Second Summer of Love: How Dance Music Took Over the World. London: John Blake. ISBN 978-1-7894-6075-9.
