= Forma (band) =

American electronic band

- Origin: Brooklyn
- Genre: Electronic
- Years active: 2011 – Present
- Labels: Spectrum Spools, Kranky
- Members: Mark Dwinell, George Bennett, John Also Bennett
- Past members: Sophie Lam

Forma is an American electronic band from Brooklyn. The group released two full-length albums for Spectrum Spools in 2011 and 2012. After a lineup change (John Also Bennett replaced founding member Sophie Lam), they released an EP for NYC techno label The Bunker New York in 2014. In September 2016, Forma released Physicalist, a full-length album for long standing ambient label Kranky. Physicalist was the first Forma recording to utilize acoustic instrumentation, including music composed on piano, flute and percussion instruments.

== Members ==
- Mark Dwinell – Synthesizers, Piano.
- George Bennett – Drum Programming, Percussion.
- John Also Bennett – Synthesizers, Piano, Flute.

== Former members ==
- Sophie Lam – Synthesizers

== Discography ==
- Forma (Spectrum Spools, 2011)
- Off/On (Spectrum Spools, 2012)
- Cool Haptics EP (The Bunker New York, 2014)
- Physicalist (Kranky, 2016)
- Semblance (Kranky, 2018)
