= Dapayk =

German music producer

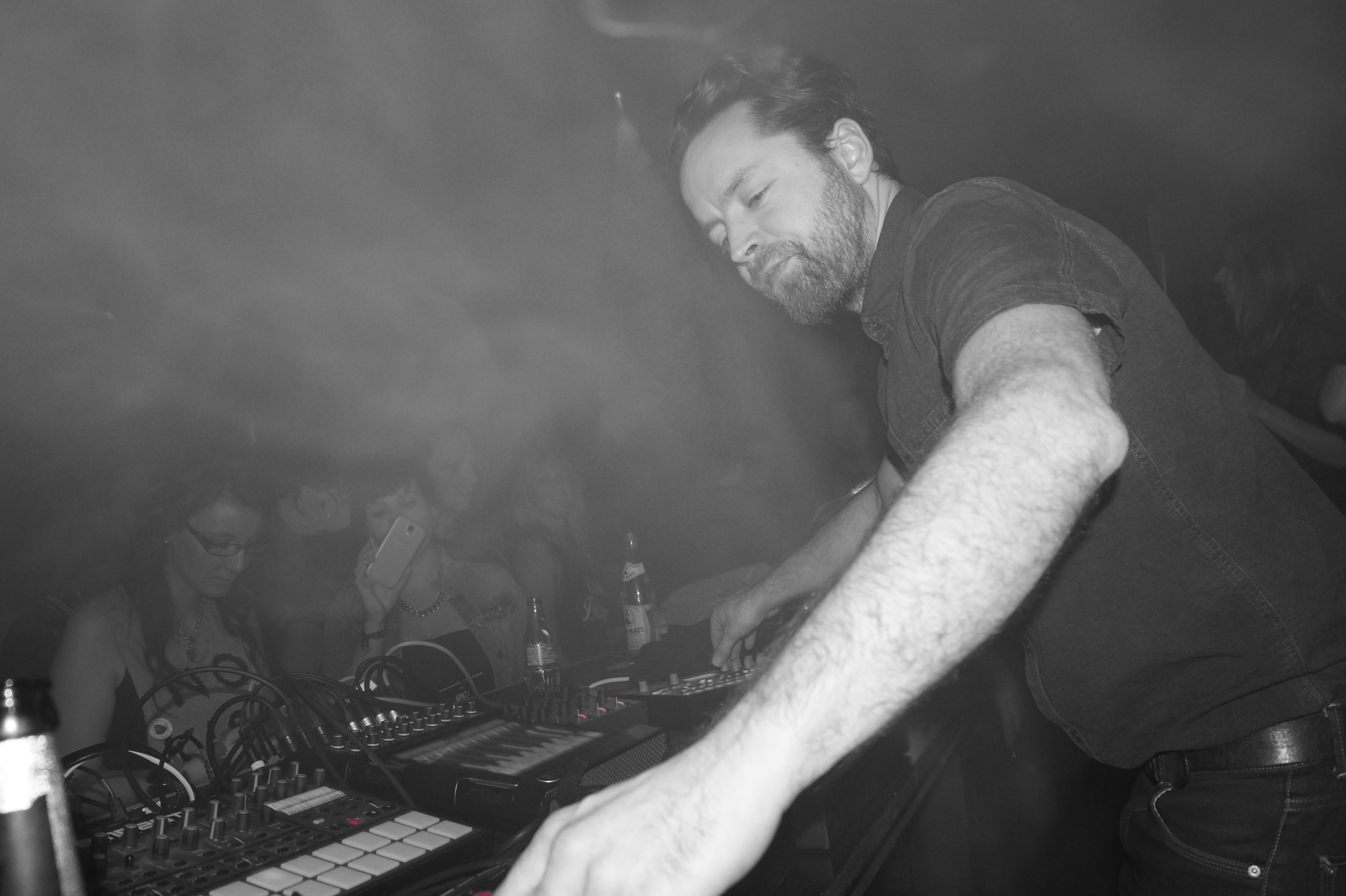
Dapayk at I Love Vinyl Wintersession 2013

Dapayk is an alias for German musician, label owner and techno producer Niklas Worgt (born 8 February 1978). He is one of the protagonists of Germany's MinimalTechno scene.

== Biography ==
Born in Bad Frankenhausen, Thuringia Dapayk initially came into contact with BrokenBeats and Drum and Bass in the early 90s. His first stage appearances happened as the DrumandBass Live Act 'Frauds in White' and marked the beginning of his career in the electronic music business. With 'Frauds in White' and his former alter ego 'Sonstware' Dapayk became a well-known Resident DJ in Central Germany.

By the end of the 90s he reformed his sounds. His productions transcended from broken beats to straight Techno. A form of Techno that is known today as an experimental platform under the alias Dapayk.

In 2000, after his first releases Dapayk founded his label 'Mo's Ferry Productions'. The label is mainly dedicated to minimalistic Techno and was extended by the sublabels 'Fenou' in 2005 and 'Rrygular' in 2006. His significant role in MinimalTechno today is due to his appearances as a live act, remixer and various collaborations. With his wife, photo model Eva Padberg, he formed the project 'Dapayk & Padberg' and released their fifth album 'Harbour' in the spring of 2017, after the success of 'Close Up', 'Black Beauty', 'Sweet Nothings' and 'Smoke'.

Apart from his own labels Dapayk releases on labels such as ‘Stil vor Talent’, ‘Herzblut’, ‘Karloff’, ‘Textone’, ‘Orac’, ‘Contexterrrior’, ‘Resopal Schallware’ and ‘Friends of Tomorrow’. Furthermore, he produced various solo albums incognito as ‘Marek Bois’ on ‘Trapez’ or ‘Rrygular’.

Dapayk continues to work as studio producer for artists like Monika Kruse, 'Marcel Knopf' and 'Kleinschmager Audio'.

== Private life ==
After being in a relationship for ten years, Niklas Worgt married photo model Eva Padberg on 29 July 2006. They live together in Berlin.

== Albums ==
2005	"Close Up"	The debut of Dapayk & Padberg focusing on Rave and Techhouse.
2006	"Impulsion Parasite"	Dapayk's solo debut is between clubfloor and experimental Sound. The CD version contains a second CD with pure ‚ListeningElectronica' pieces.
2007	"Black Beauty"	The inner circle of Techno saw ‚Black Beauty' as the response to the downfall of vinyl. Dapayk & Padberg's second album shows blurred lines between MinimalTechno and Pop, while at the same time, focusing on highly emphasized HipHop sound collages.
2008	"Boissche Untiefen"	Dapayk's debut as his alter ego ‚Marek Bois' is pure MinimalTechno and its tendency to Rave the heart and soul of "Boissche Untiefen".
2008	"Devil's House"	Dapayk's second solo album has a gloomy feel to it. Besides dance floor pieces the influence of Breakbeat elements is very pronounced.
2010	"Decade One (2000–2010)"	Unreleased tracks and remastered material create a retrospection of Dapayk's first creative period. The album is clearly inspired by Jazz influences.
2012	"Sweet Nothings"	Dapayk & Padberg's third album is characterized by melodious Techno as they both stated in an interview.
2013	"Smoke"	The fourth album of Dapayk & Padberg turns away from the dance floor and towards ListeningElectronica. It increases Dubstep elements as well as songlike structures.
2015	"#nofilter"	"More straightforward, more reduced, more analog and dirtier than anything i have done before“.

== Sound ==
Dapayk describes his own tone as 'frickle'. Sound wise he experiments merging separate musical art forms from Minimal, Electronica and Breakbeats into one.

== Discography (Excerpt) ==
Name	Title	Label
Dapayk (solo)	Impulsion Parasite [Album]	Mo's Ferry Productions
Dapayk (solo)	Impulsion Parasite [Single]	Mo's Ferry Productions
Marek Bois	Mampe halb/halb	Rrygular
Marek Bois	You Got Good Ash Rmxs	Trapez
Dapayk (solo)	Effessefedepp	Karloff
Marek Bois	Fake EP	Rrygular
Marek Bois	Boisboisbois	Trapez
Dapayk (solo)	Giornata	Friends of Tomorrow
Dapayk (solo)	Untergelgen EP	Orac
Dapayk (solo)	Fat Kid's Choice	Resopal
Dapayk & Padberg	Close Up [Album]	Mo's Ferry Productions
Dapayk & Midnight	Fenou01	Fenou
Dapayk (solo)	Marek & das Polenpony	Karloff
Dapayk & Padberg	Maze	Mo's Ferry Productions
Dapayk (solo)	Daypack	Mo's Ferry Productions
Dapayk (solo)	Black, White, Orange, Lines	Textone
Dapayk & Padberg	Dirty White	Mo's Ferry Productions
Dapayk & Padberg	Semaphore	Mo's Ferry Productions
Dapayk & Padberg	Think & Speak	Mo's Ferry Productions
Dapayk & Padberg	Goddess	Mo's Ferry Productions
Dapayk (solo)	Heimweh	Mo's Ferry Productions
Dapayk (solo)	TPZ EP	Mo's Ferry Productions
Dapayk (solo)	Call Me Names	DPK

== Remixes (Excerpt) ==
Name	Title	Label
Saint Ibot	Tschäkk	TFE Tecords
Koefer & Strube	Arbeitshypothese	WhirlPoolSexMusic
Hacienda	h.a.c.i.e.n.d.a.	Ministry of Sound
Paradroid	The Balearic Dream Recovery	Adjunct Audio
Mathias Schaffhäuser	Coincidance	Ware
Alland Byallo	My Nightlight	NightLightMusic
Tanaka Hideyuki	Wicked Loop in Life	Mo's Ferry Productions
Deladap	Cza Manca	Eccochamber
Malou	Worldplay	Discowax
Nitsch & Gleinser	Rollbots	Karatemusik

== Awards ==
In 2005 Dapayk and Padberg's first album 'Close Up' was under the Top 10 of the de:Bug and Groove Magazine’s charts. In 2007 the project ‘Dapayk and Padberg’ received the Style Award of Musikexpress in the category ‘Performer – Domestic’.
