= Stars of the Lid =

American ambient music project

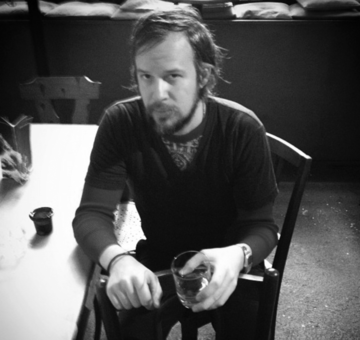
- Adam Wiltzie, the current sole member, in 2012

Background information
- Origin: Austin, Texas, United States
- Genres: Drone; ambient; minimalism; contemporary classical
- Instruments: Guitar, piano, synthesizer
- Years active: 1992–present
- Labels: Kranky; Sedimental; Sub Rosa
- Members: Adam Wiltzie
- Past members: Brian McBride; Kirk Laktas
- Website: brainwashed.com/sotl/

Stars of the Lid is an American ambient music project formed in Austin, Texas in 1992 by Brian McBride and Adam Wiltzie. They have been acclaimed for their music incorporating droning, effects-treated guitars along with piano, strings, and horns, described as "divine, classical drone without the tedious intrusion of drums or vocals." After McBride's death in 2023, Wiltzie became the sole project member.

== History ==
Brian McBride and Adam Wiltzie formed Stars of the Lid on December 25, 1992 in Austin, Texas. McBride said in an interview that the band's name refers to "your own personal cinema, located between your eye and eyelid", suggesting the colors and patterns one can see with closed eyes (either phosphenes or closed-eye hallucinations). They listed among their influences minimalist and electronic composers such as Arvo Pärt, Zbigniew Preisner, Gavin Bryars, Henryk Górecki and Brian Eno, as well as post-rock artists Talk Talk and Labradford. They recorded their debut album, Music for Nitrous Oxide, throughout 1993 and 1994 with third musician Kirk Laktas, and released the album in 1995 on the Sedimental label. Laktas did not continue with the group, and the duo of McBride and Wiltzie steadily continued with Gravitational Pull vs. the Desire for an Aquatic Life in 1996, The Ballasted Orchestra in 1997, Per Aspera Ad Astra in 1998, and Avec Laudenum in 1999, as well as the limited-edition EP Maneuvering the Nocturnal Hum and a split single with Windsor for the Derby, both in 1998.

Stars of the Lid then released their first double album, The Tired Sounds of Stars of the Lid, in late October 2001. Nearly six years later, the duo released their second double album, And Their Refinement of the Decline, in April 2007 to widespread critical acclaim. In December 2007, American webzine Somewhere Cold voted Stars of the Lid Artist of the Year on their 2007 Somewhere Cold Awards Hall of Fame.

Stars of the Lid toured worldwide throughout 2007 and 2008 in support of the album; throughout their European tour, they were joined live by a string trio featuring Lucinda Chua of Felix on cello, Noura Sanatian on violin, and Ela Baruch on viola. Their North American line-up included Julia Kent on cello. The band would very occasionally play shows around the world from 2009 to 2017, usually as part of a one-off event.

The duo was active pursuing side projects and solo releases after And Their Refinement of the Decline. A teaser trailer for a possible Stars of the Lid feature film surfaced on the internet in 2008, but the group did not release any new material.

McBride died in August 2023. A subsequent interview by The Guardian with Wiltzie confirmed that he may be interested in finishing and publishing music the duo had left behind. According to the article, sessions were done throughout the 2010s with a “list of what was supposed to be the next release” apparently recorded. Wiltzie plans on eventually releasing an album's worth of their recordings, stating, “I can’t yet put my arms around the memory of Brian, but someday I am going to try to do this for everyone, so at least the end is documented.”

With Wiltzie completing some of the work that remained unfinished, no official disbandment has yet been confirmed on any social media page or article, as new official releases may surface.

== Solo and side projects ==
Brian McBride and Adam Wiltzie have both released material outside of Stars of the Lid. McBride released his first solo album, When the Detail Lost Its Freedom, in November 2005, then released The Effective Disconnect in October 2010, which serves as a soundtrack to the documentary Vanishing of the Bees, a film about colony collapse disorder. McBride teamed up with musician Kenneth James Gibson and began recording and releasing new music under the name Bell Gardens; their debut EP, Hangups Need Company, was released in May 2010; their first full-length album, Full Sundown Assembly, followed in November 2012; and their second album, Slow Dawns for Lost Conclusions, was released in October 2014 via Rocket Girl.

Wiltzie has been involved in several collaborative projects: the Dead Texan (with visual artist Christina Vantzou), Aix Em Klemm (with Robert Donne from Labradford), and A Winged Victory for the Sullen (with composer Dustin O'Halloran). Wiltzie lives in Brussels, Belgium, while McBride lived in Los Angeles, California until his death.

== Band members ==
=== Current members ===
- Adam Wiltzie (1992–present)

=== Former members ===
- Brian McBride (1992–2023; his death)
- Kirk Laktas (1993–1994)

== Discography ==
Albums

- 1995: Music for Nitrous Oxide
- 1996: Gravitational Pull vs. the Desire for an Aquatic Life
- 1997: The Ballasted Orchestra
- 1998: Per Aspera Ad Astra
- 1999: Avec Laudenum
- 2001: The Tired Sounds of Stars of the Lid
- 2007: And Their Refinement of the Decline

Others:

- 1998: Maneuvering the Nocturnal Hum (EP)
- 2007: Carte-de-Visite (1997–2007 outtakes)

Split releases

- 1997: The Kahanek Incident, Vol. 3 (12" with Labradford) (Trance Syndicate) – SOTL track reissued on 2007's Carte-de-Visite
- 1998: Split (7" with Windsor for the Derby) (33 Degrees)

Compilation appearances

- 1996: Monsters, Robots and Bug Men – "Goodnight" (Virgin)
- 2002: Brain in the Wire – "Requiem for Dying Mothers (Version i, Zamachowski op. 87)" (Brainwashed)
- 2003: 1993–2003: 1st Decade in the Machines – "I Love You, But I Prefer Trondheim" (Jester)
- 2004: Kompilation – "Even If You're Never Awake (Version)" (Kranky)
- 2008: Brainwaves 2008 – "May 2nd 2008 (Live in NYC)" (Brainwashed)
