= Music for Nitrous Oxide =

Studio album by Stars of the Lid
- Released: June 1, 1995
- Recorded: August 1993 – September 1994
- Genre: Ambient; drone
- Length: 76:31
- Label: Sedimental
- Producer: Neal Weinberg

Stars of the Lid chronology
| Music for Nitrous Oxide (1995) | Gravitational Pull vs. the Desire for an Aquatic Life (1996) |

Music for Nitrous Oxide is the debut studio album released by Stars of the Lid on Sedimental Records in 1995. The album features minimal, droning compositions of varying length. The press release from Sedimental Records read: “Sedimental announces the first CD from Austin drone stars Stars of the Lid, an amazing 4-track recording that is created in the spirit of Eno, Main and Spacemen 3. Produced without keyboards, this lo-fi ambient journey employs predominately [sic] guitar, avoiding typical rock elements while still possessing the ‘home’ recorded feel of so much independent music.”

Until 2025 the album was only ever available on the compact disc format. Released in standard jewel case by Sedimental in 1995 and reissued as a digipak with updated artwork in 2008. It was remastered and made available on the double vinyl record format by Artificial Pine Arch Manufacturing in summer of 2025.

"Adamord" features an excerpt of a letter written by Alcoholics Anonymous co-founder Lois W., addressed to her husband. It also incorporates a main sample of the electricity bolts blasting taken from the Lynch/Frost Productions screen that would run at the end of each episode of the American television series Twin Peaks.

Track four features an audio clip of Brent Spiner from the seventh season of Star Trek: The Next Generation episode "Force of Nature". Spiner's character Data is shown attempting to train his cat Spot not to jump onto his keyboard while he is working. Track four also contains an unknown Christian radio broadcast and a snippet of Chopin's Prelude Op.28, No.7.

Track five features a clip from the film Apocalypse Now during which Frederic Forrest's character Jay 'Chef' Hicks suffers a nervous breakdown aboard a boat after encountering a tiger in the Cambodian jungle. This clip is interspersed with one of an unknown program discussing extraterrestrial surveillance of human beings by Ufologist Robert Dean.

Track seven features an audio clip of C.H. Evans who played Jack in Hap's Diner, in David Lynch's film Twin Peaks: Fire Walk with Me. Evans' line is: "Now, her name is Irene and it is night. Don't go any further with it. There's nothin' good about it."

== Recording ==
Most of the album was recorded on a Yamaha MT120 4-Track cassette recorder. However, track nine was recorded on a Revox A77 2-track reel-to-reel recorder, and track 6 was recorded to DAT tape from their first live performance in the Spring of 1994.

== Track listing ==
1. “Before Top Dead Center” – 5:25
2. “Adamord” – 11:51
3. “Madison” – 9:24
4. “Down” – 6:34
5. “Lagging” – 3:58
6. “(Live) Lid” – 9:48
7. “Tape Hiss Makes Me Happy” – 13:05
8. “The Swell Song” – 9:24
9. “Goodnight” – 7:02
