= Bell Gardens (band) =

US musical group

- Origin: Los Angeles, California, United States
- Genres: Chamber pop; psychedelic pop; Americana; modern classical; neo-psychedelia; folk rock
- Instruments: guitar; piano; synthesizer; drums; strings
- Years active: 2009–present
- Labels: Rocket Girl; Southern Records; Burger Records; Failed Better
- Members: Kenneth James Gibson; Julian Goldwhite; Charlie Woodburn; Chris Camacho; Dain Luscombe
- Past members: Brian McBride
- Website: Official website

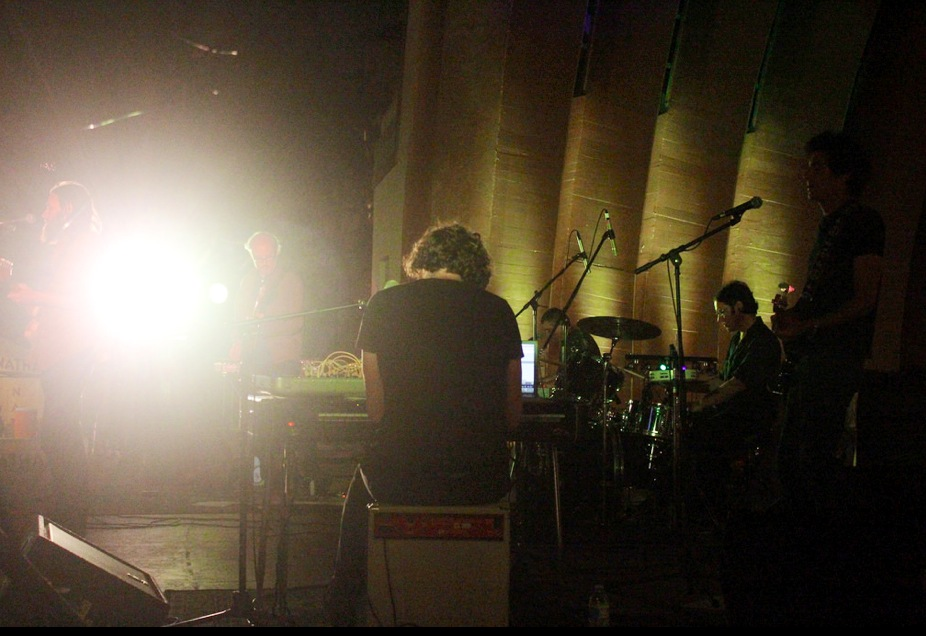
Bell Gardens performing at the Pasadena Levitt Pavilion, 2014.

Bell Gardens was the musical collaboration between Kenneth James Gibson and Brian McBride. Through the music of Bell Gardens, they explored the many realms of chamber pop, folk rock, psychedelic pop, and Americana. Their first EP Hangups Need Company was released on their own imprint Failed Better in 2010. Southern Records released their first LP Full Sundown Assembly in late 2012. Rocket Girl released the band's second LP titled Slow Dawns For Lost Conclusions in October, 2014. Bell Gardens was based in Los Angeles, California.

== Discography ==
Albums

- Slow Dawns for Lost Conclusions (Rocket Girl, 2014)
- Full Sundown Assembly (Southern Records, 2012 / Burger Records, 2013)

EPs

- Hangups Need Company (Failed Better, 2010 / Burger Records, 2012)
