= Lucinda Chua =

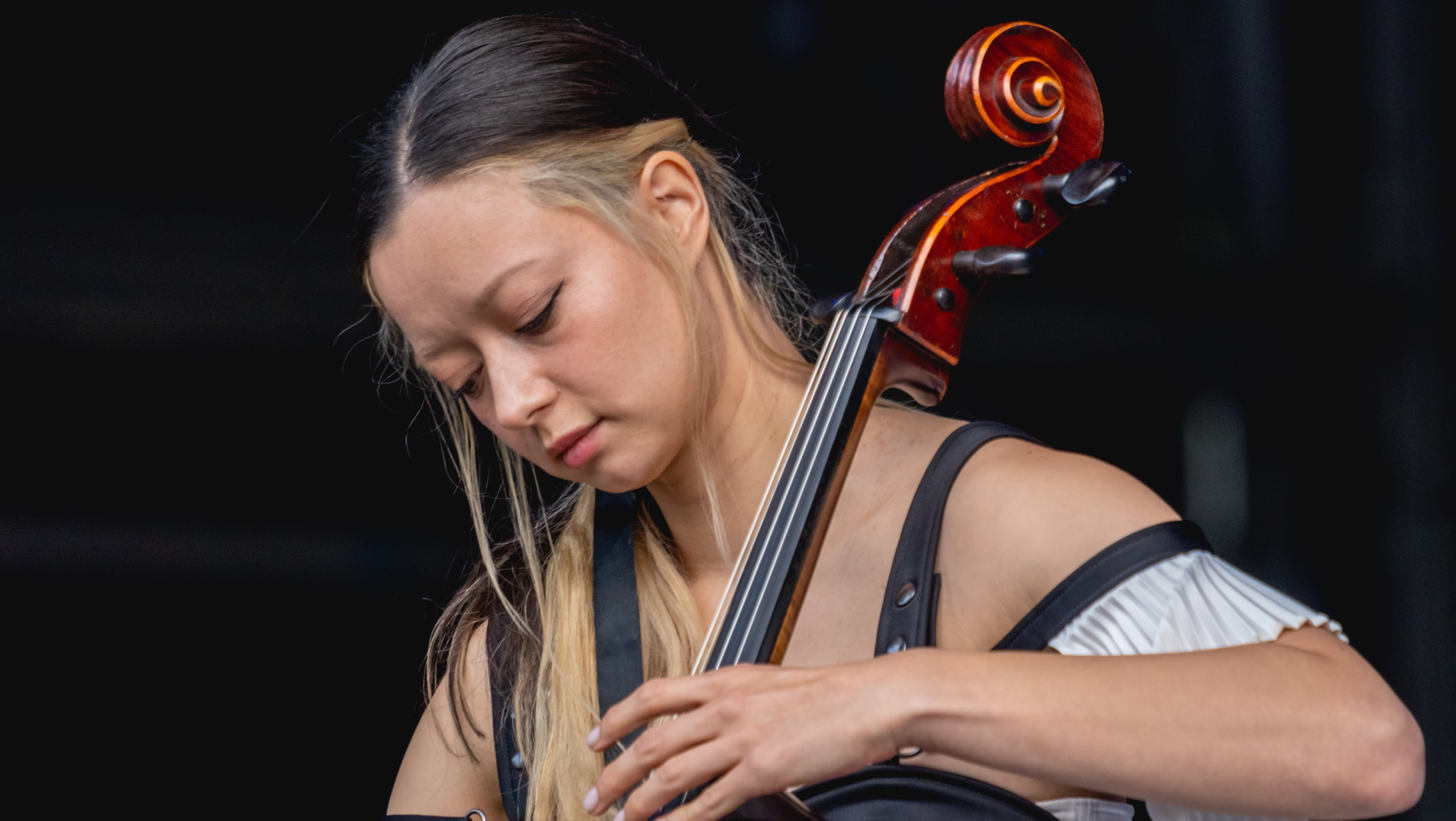
- Lucinda Chua performing in 2021

Background information
- Born: Hammersmith, London, England
- Genres: Indie; ambient
- Occupation: Musician
- Instruments: Cello; piano; vocals
- Years active: 2019–present
- Label: 4AD
- Formerly of: Felix
- Website: lucindachua.com

Lucinda Chua is a London-born cellist and composer of mixed English, Malaysian, and Chinese heritage.

== Biography ==
Lucinda Chua was born in Hammersmith to an English mother and a Chinese-Malay father from Kuching. They moved to Milton Keynes when Chua was 10.

Chua learned to play piano by ear at the age of three. At the age of ten, she was allowed to take up the cello, which was her wish ever since she heard a string quartet playing "Pachelbel's Canon in D Major" on a family day out in Covent Garden.

She left Milton Keynes to study photography at Nottingham Trent University. There, she also took an elective course on lo-fi music production, by the end of which she had a CD with seven songs. During her studies she played gigs with bands and she often played as a support act for visiting artists like Bat for Lashes and Martha Wainwright. She also became one half of chamber pop duo Felix which issued two albums before disbanding. She toured with Stars of the Lid and later became FKA Twigs's cellist during the Magdalene era.

As a solo artist, Chua released the Antidotes 1 EP (2019) and the Antidotes 2 EP (2021). Only after the pandemic struck and all tours were canceled, she started to work on her debut album Yian, named after her middle name in Mandarin which translates to "swallow". Yian was released in 2023. She also released a three-track EP, Reclaiming the Rose, in that year.

== Influences ==
Chua cites PJ Harvey, Cat Power and Talk Talk as her music influences, along with Otis Redding and Nina Simone who were often played at her house while she was growing up.

== Discography ==
=== Studio albums ===
- Yian (2023)

=== EPs ===
- Antidotes 1 (2019)
- Antidotes 2 (2021)
- Reclaiming the Rose (2023)
