= Brian McBride (musician) =

American ambient musician (1970–2023)

- Born: Brian Edward McBride; July 6, 1970; Irving, Texas, U.S.
- Died: August 25, 2023 (aged 53)
- Genres: Ambient
- Formerly of: Bell Gardens, Stars of the Lid

Brian Edward McBride (July 6, 1970 – August 25, 2023) was an American musician best known as one half of the ambient duo Stars of the Lid. He also released two solo albums, When The Detail Lost Its Freedom and The Effective Disconnect, on Kranky using his own name. McBride moved to Austin, Texas, in 1990 where he met Adam Wiltzie, forming Stars of the Lid in the early 1990s. He also worked with the now defunct Pilot Ships. McBride was also a member of the duo Bell Gardens.

McBride lived in Los Angeles. He was an active member of the policy debate community. In 2009, Brian teamed up with musician Kenneth James Gibson to form the band Bell Gardens. Their first EP Hangups Need Company was released on their own imprint Failed Better in 2010. Southern Records released their first LP Full Sundown Assembly in 2012 and Rocket Girl released their second LP Slow Dawns For Lost Conclusions in 2014.

== Life and work ==
During the summer he directed the University of Texas National Institute of Forensics (UTNIF) high school debate camp. He coached policy debate at the University of Southern California.

== Death ==
McBride died in August 2023, at the age of 53, of natural causes.

== Discography ==
Solo

- When the Detail Lost Its Freedom (Kranky, 2005)
- The Effective Disconnect (Kranky, 2010)

With Bell Gardens

- Hangups Need Company (Failed Better, 2010)
- Full Sundown Assembly (Southern Records, 2012)
- Slow Dawns for Lost Conclusions (Rocket Girl, 2014)
