= Kranky (record label) =

American independent record label

- Founded: 1993
- Founder: Bruce Adams; Joel Leoschke
- Genre: Ambient; drone; post-rock; techno; Krautrock
- Country of origin: United States
- Location: Chicago
- Official website: kranky.net

Kranky (stylized as kranky) is an American independent record label based in Chicago. It was founded in 1993 by Joel Leoschke and Bruce Adams, who both had backgrounds in the music industry. The label releases experimental music, such as ambient and post-rock.

== History and operation ==
Kranky was founded in the spring of 1993 by Joel Leoschke and Bruce Adams in Chicago. They created Kranky with the intent of releasing Prazision LP by Labradford, which was the first release of the label. Adams first moved to Chicago from Ann Arbor in 1987. In Chicago, he worked at Kaleidoscope, a music distributor in Des Plaines; Touch & Go Records, after quitting work at Kaleidoscope in a year of working for it; and Cargo Music Distribution, which he started working for in the spring of 1991. Adams and Leoschke were still working for Cargo when forming Kranky. The label's second release was This Is Not a Dream in 1995, a compilation album by Dadamah. In 2006, Adams left Kranky and founded label Flingco Sound. In 2005, Brian Foote joined Kranky to co-operate it.

Kranky releases ambient, drone, post-rock, techno, and Krautrock music from musicians and bands such as Stars of the Lid, Loscil, Tim Hecker, and Godspeed You! Black Emperor. According to Resident Advisor, "[Kranky] let[s] artists do whatever they want without interfering", and that Kranky rarely runs advertisements.

== Artists ==
Adapted from Kranky's official website in 2021.

=== Current ===
- Anjou
- Atlas Sound
- Autistic Daughters
- A Winged Victory for the Sullen
- Jessica Bailiff
- Belong
- Benoit Pioulard
- Bird Show
- Christopher Bissonnette
- Boduf Songs
- Ken Camden
- Christina Carter
- Tom Carter
- Charalambides
- Clear Horizon
- Clinic Stars
- Cloudland Canyon
- Greg Davis
- The Dead Texan
- Deerhunter
- Demen
- Disappears
- Dreamscape
- Earthen Sea
- Ethernet
- Felix
- Forma
- Grouper
- Brent Gutzeit
- Chihei Hatakeyama
- Steve Hauschildt
- Tim Hecker
- Chris Herbert
- High Plains
- Implodes
- Gregg Kowalsky
- Labradford
- Less Bells
- Lichens
- Loscil
- Lotus Plaza
- Brian McBride
- Mirrorring
- MJ Guider
- Nudge
- Tara Jane O'Neil
- Pan American
- Andrew Pekler
- Raglani
- Jonas Reinhardt
- Dean Roberts
- Saloli
- Dawn Smithson
- Stars of the Lid
- Strategy
- To Kill a Petty Bourgeoisie
- Valet
- Christina Vantzou
- Justin Walter
- Keith Fullerton Whitman
- White Rainbow
- Windy & Carl

=== Former ===
- Aix Em Klemm
- Amp
- Bowery Electric
- Christmas Decorations
- Dadamah
- Doldrums
- Flies Inside the Sun
- Fontanelle
- Godspeed You! Black Emperor
- Growing
- Jessamine
- Low
- Magnog
- Roy Montgomery
- Out Hud
- Philosopher's Stone
- James Plotkin
- Spiny Anteaters
- Mark Spybey
- Tomorrowland
