= Mark Speer =

American guitarist and songwriter

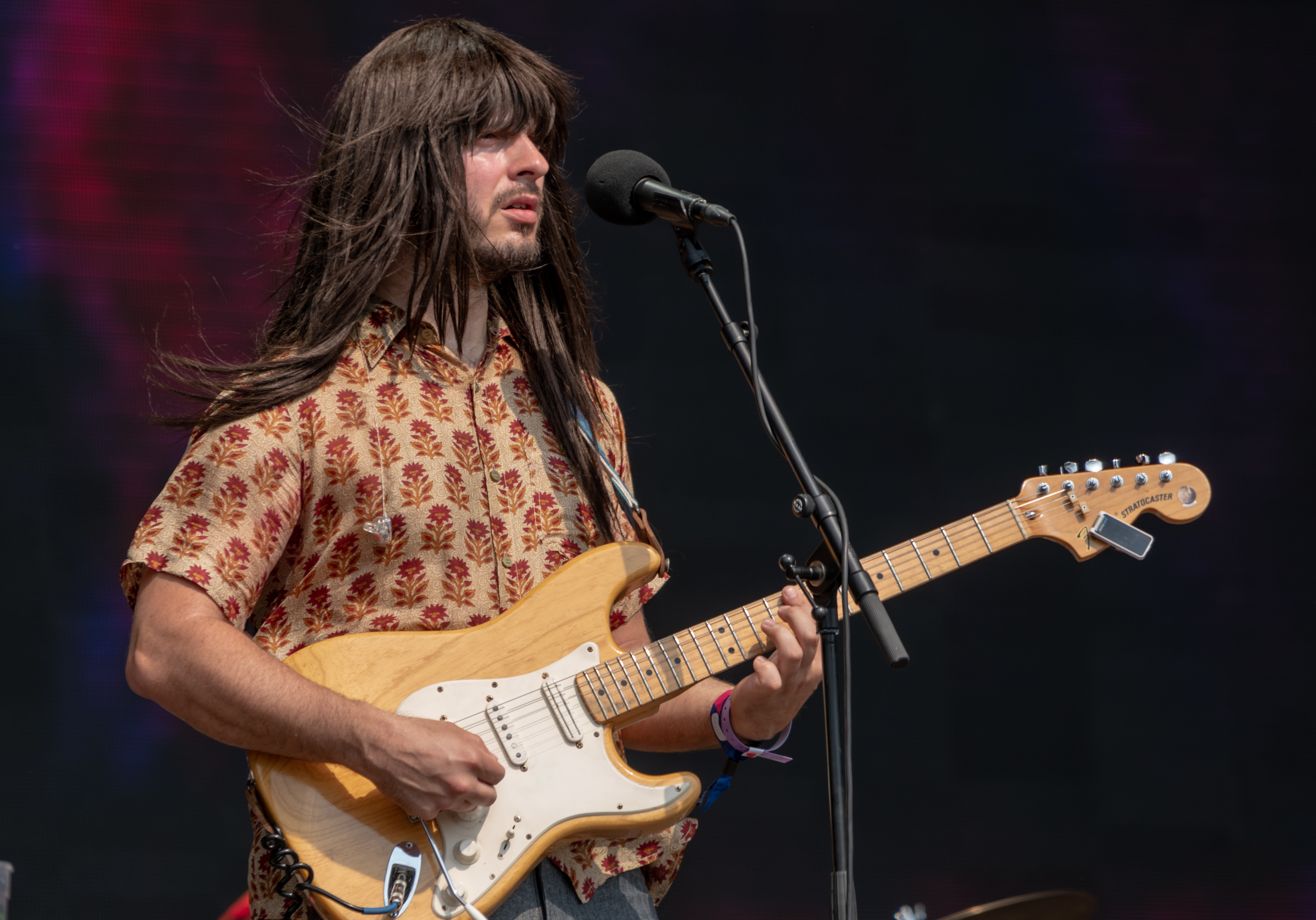
- Speer performing with Khruangbin in All Points East festival, 2018

Background information
- Born: November 9, 1979 (age 46); Houston, Texas, U.S.
- Genres: Psychedelia; surf rock; funk; instrumental rock; dub
- Instruments: Guitar; drums; bass guitar; vocals
- Years active: 2004–present
- Labels: Dead Oceans; Night Time Stories
- Member of: Khruangbin

Mark Speer (born November 9, 1979) is an American musician and songwriter, best known as the guitarist and one of the founding members of the musical trio Khruangbin.

== Biography ==
Mark Speer was born November 9, 1979, in Houston, Texas. The first music video he remembers seeing on MTV is Grandmaster Flash’s "The Message", the production of which he found intriguing. One of the first concerts he attended as a child was that of Parliament-Funkadelic.

Speer initially wanted to play drums but could not afford them, so he started playing bass guitar. Later, he borrowed a four-track cassette recorder from a friend of his dad, and was making tracks with Casio drums by playing them with his fingers. He wanted to put chords on them, so he borrowed a guitar from a friend and started learning jazz fusion chords.

Speer met future bandmate Donald "DJ" Johnson in 2004 while playing in Rudy Rasmus' St. John's Methodist Church gospel band in Houston, Texas. The church employed Speer as the guitarist and Johnson as the organist. He later met Laura Lee Ochoa through mutual friends, where they initially connected over a shared love of Afghan music and Middle Eastern architecture. In 2010, Speer and Lee went on tour with Yppah and Bonobo. During this time, they recruited DJ on drums and formed Khruangbin.

Speer has recorded five studio albums with Khruangbin: The Universe Smiles Upon You (2015), Con Todo el Mundo (2018), Mordechai (2020), Ali (with Vieux Farka Touré; 2022), and A LA SALA (2024). His family owns a barn in Burton, Texas, where Khruangbin records all their music.

== Songwriting, technique and equipment ==
Speer uses a Fender Stratocaster. He replaced its neck and bridge pickups with DiMarzio Cruisers to avoid 60 cycle hum in studio settings. He uses D'Addario Chromes flatwound strings, buying .012-.052 sets and an additional single .010, throwing away the .052, and tuning to standard EADGBE. Due to the consistency of tone throughout the lifespan of flatwounds, he only changes his strings approximately once per tour. Similarly, Speer only has one guitar pick, which is worn to a round tip.

In the studio, Speer uses a Fender Deluxe Reverb '65 Reissue guitar amplifier; live, he uses a '68 Custom Deluxe Reverb. He connects his guitar into a Dunlop Cry Baby Classic pedal that he never turns off. From there, the connection goes to a Boss PH-3, Boss DS-1, MXR Dyna Comp, Electro-Harmonix Holy Grail, and Strymon El Capistan with an expression pedal. Sometimes, he uses his amp's vibrato effect.

Much of Speer's guitar style comes from seeking to emulate the harmonic and timbral characteristics of other instruments, such as the krar, bağlama, rubab, shamisen, mbira, and djembe.

Speer prefers the band's compositions to center primarily around bass and drums, instead of guitar. He provides occasional vocals for the band, although he dislikes singing in general.

== Influences ==
Speer has mentioned Roy Ayers, Prince, Roots Radics, Mark Knopfler, Steely Dan, Lata Mangeshkar, Sezen Aksu, DJ Sun, and Ernie Isley as his biggest influences. He described Kassav's album Lagué mwen as an album that changed his life. A self-professed "world music nerd" and a devoted crate digger, Speer is interested in music from all over the world, preferring music that is not in the English language, and tones that are not very prevalent in Western music. In Khruangbin, Speer tries to replace the lead singer's role with his guitar, so he listens to a lot more singers than he does to guitar players.
