= Donald "DJ" Johnson =

American drummer, songwriter and producer

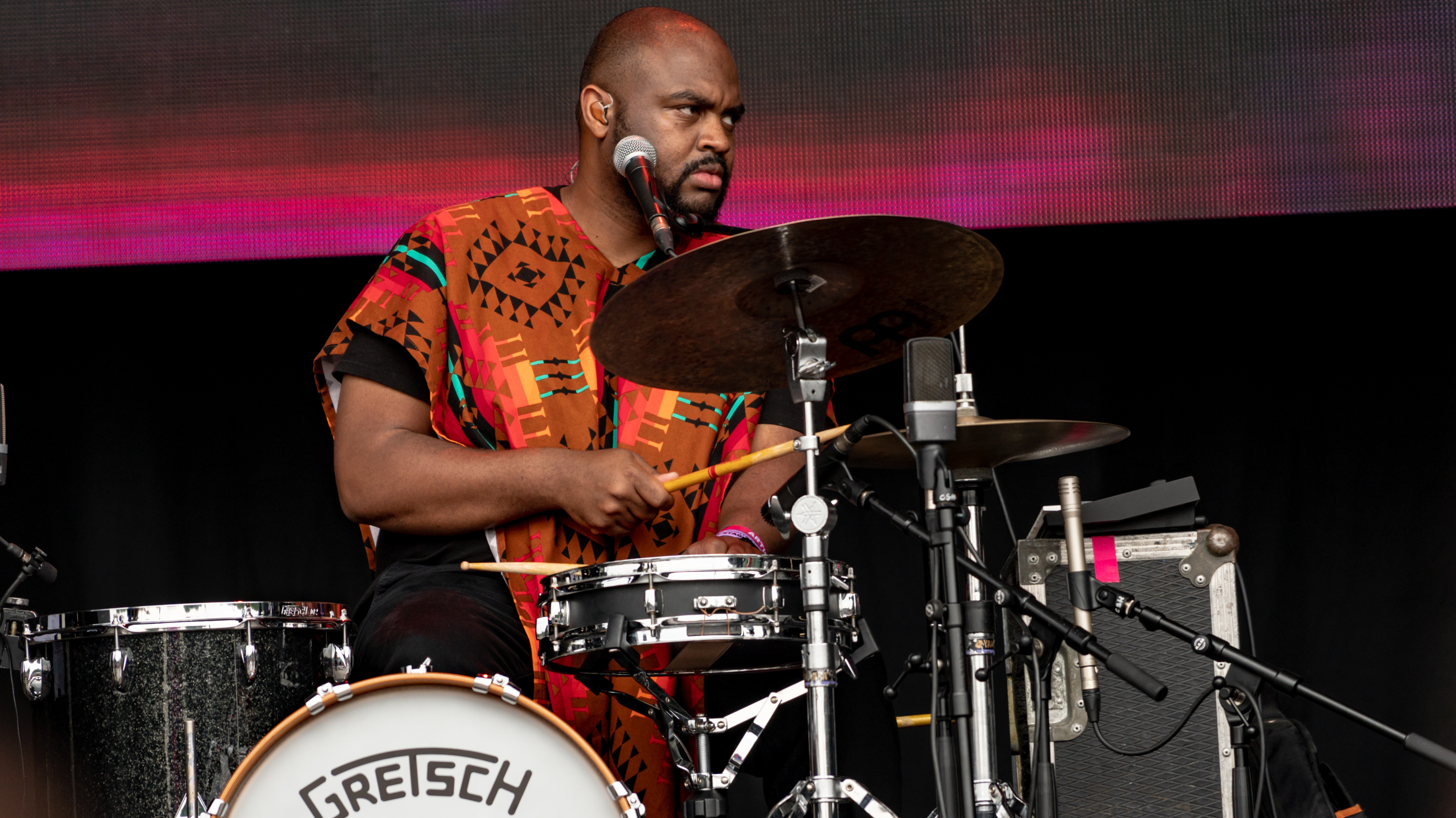
- Johnson performing with Khruangbin in 2018

Background information
- Also known as: Donald Johnson; Beanz
- Born: Donald Johnson Jr. March 13, 1983 (age 43); Houston, Texas, U.S.
- Genres: Psychedelia; surf rock; funk; instrumental rock; dub; hip hop; soul
- Occupations: Musician; songwriter; record producer
- Instruments: Drums; keyboards; bass guitar; vocals
- Years active: 2004–present
- Labels: Dead Oceans; Night Time Stories
- Member of: Khruangbin; Beanz N Kornbread

Donald "DJ" Johnson Jr. is an American musician, songwriter, and music producer best known as the drummer for Khruangbin, a trio from Houston, Texas, and one half of the hip hop production duo Beanz N Kornbread.

== Background ==
Johnson grew up playing drums, moving to keyboard organ in his late teens. He has remarked on the cultural diversity of growing up in Houston, with people from all over the world living in the region and playing their music, as influencing his sound.

Johnson is an alumnus of Texas All State Symphonic Wind Ensemble and studied orchestral percussion with instructor Jim Whitfill.

Johnson met guitarist and future Khruangbin bandmate Mark Speer in 2004 at the Red Cat Jazz Cafe in Houston. The two later worked together as hired players in Pastor Rudy Rasmus' St. John's United Methodist Church gospel band in the city, where Johnson played organ and Speer played guitar.

Johnson has recorded five studio albums with Khruangbin: The Universe Smiles Upon You (2015), Con Todo el Mundo (2018), Mordechai (2020), Ali (with Vieux Farka Touré; 2022), and A LA SALA (2024).

He lives in the Houston area where he was raised.

== Production ==
Johnson and Kenneth Roy are the music production duo Beanz N Kornbread. The duo has produced recordings of artists such as Mac Miller, Shaquille O’Neal, Slim Thug, Kirko Bangz, Z-Ro, Chamillionaire, George Clinton, Lil' Keke, Devin the Dude and Paul Wall.

== Equipment and tools ==
Johnson plays a jazz kit, which is smaller than the kit of many rock drummers. In a 2020 interview with Modern Drummer, his kit was listed as a 3×13 Diamond Drum Co. maple snare drum; a 14×14 Gretsch floor tom, and a 14×20 Gretsch bass drum. The interview stated he uses Promark DJ Johnson signature sticks and typically plays (left-handed) a Yamaha Reface keyboard in live performance with Khruangbin. Johnson's cymbals were listed as 14″ CB Percussion MX series hi-hats and an 18″ Meinl Byzance Dark crash. Johnson does not typically record to a click track.
