= Laura Lee (bassist) =

American bassist and songwriter

Laura Lee Ochoa
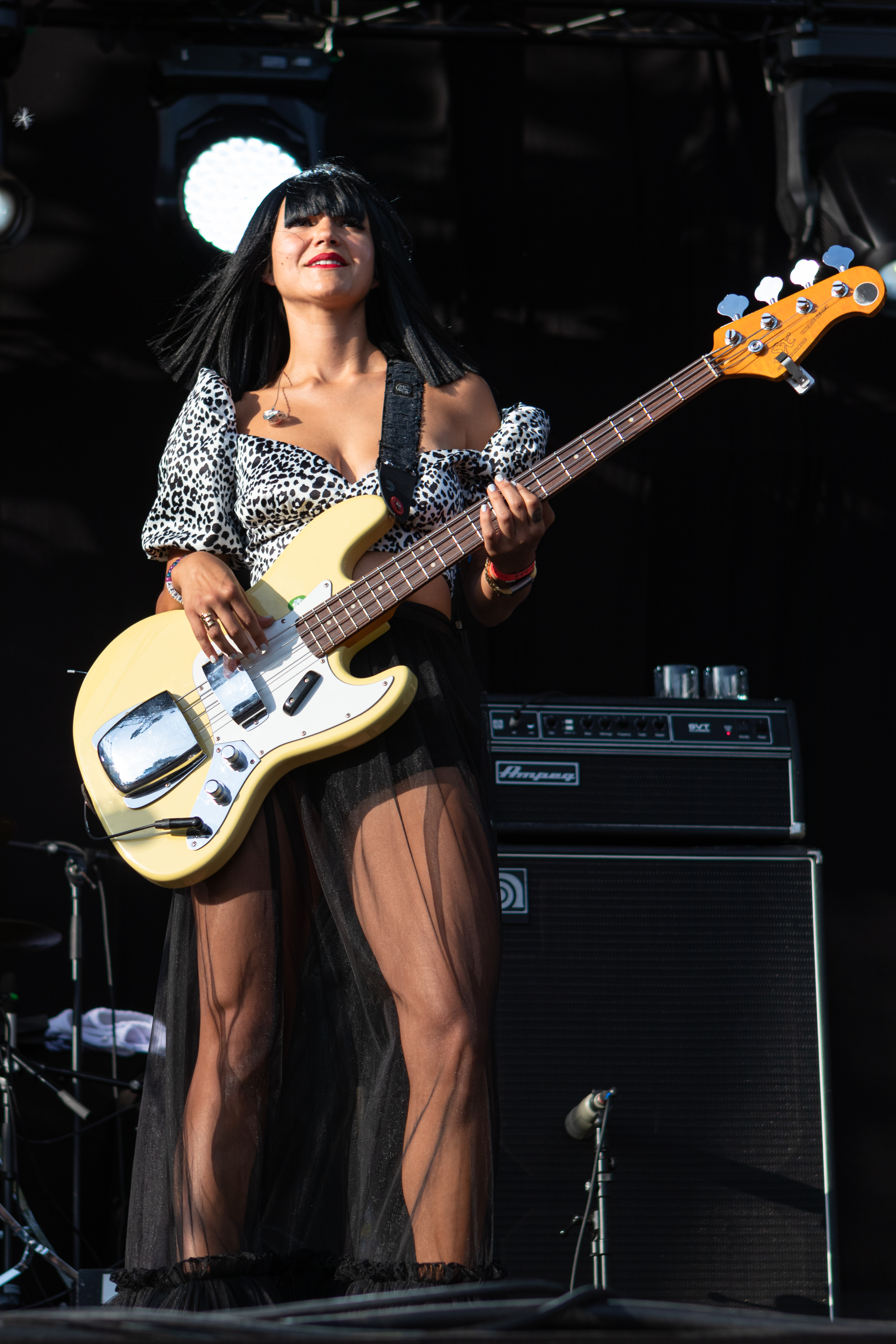
- Laura Lee Ochoa performing with Khruangbin at Haldern Pop (2019)

Background information
- Also known as: Leezy
- Born: October 14, 1986 (age 39); Houston, Texas, U.S.
- Genres: Psychedelia; surf rock; funk; instrumental rock; dub
- Instruments: Bass guitar; vocals
- Years active: 2009–present
- Labels: Dead Oceans; Night Time Stories
- Member of: Khruangbin

Laura Lee Ochoa (born October 14, 1986) is an American musician and singer-songwriter. She is the bass guitarist and one of the founding members of musical trio Khruangbin.

== Biography ==
The daughter of Mexican-American parents, Ochoa played piano and guitar as a child, but picked up bass at the suggestion of future bandmate Mark Speer. Ochoa met Speer in 2007 through friends, where they initially connected over a shared love of Afghan music. Ochoa was an art history major with a focus on art of the ancient Near East. She worked as a mathematics teacher for six years. At the time, Ochoa was interested in playing piano again and Speer suggested she "follow the sound of the bass," which reframed her approach. This recommendation led her to begin playing bass guitar in 2009, which she says came very naturally to her.

Ochoa has recorded five studio albums with Khruangbin: The Universe Smiles Upon You (2015), Con Todo el Mundo (2018), Mordechai (2020), Ali (2022) and A LA SALA (2024) as well as two EPs: Texas Sun (2021) and Texas Moon (2022), both with the band and Leon Bridges. Prior to forming the group, Lee played bass on tour with Yppah. In April, 2021, she collaborated with Los Angeles–based singer-songwriter Niia on the song "Not Up For Discussion."

In January 2026, Ochoa received the Future of Bass Award at the 2026 Bass Magazine Awards, held at The Observatory in Santa Ana, California.

== Style and stage persona ==
In Khruangbin, Ochoa performs as "Leezy," an alter-ego that helps her keep some parts of herself private: "It helps me separate from her and it helps me emotionally to put it on her, so I let her take on all of the pressure." She is the band's creative director, using her training in art and architecture to set up staging and create choreography and graphic design. Both she and Speer sport long black wigs while performing and "Leezy" goes through many costume changes throughout a show. In 2011, she made the decision to never wear the same outfit twice on stage, estimating that she has worn 600 different outfits while on tour. She wears two different outfits per show, a decision inspired by Elton John, who was known to change up to four outfits. She is also inspired by Prince who handled choreography and played guitar at the same time.
