= Late Night Tales Presents Version Excursion =

Late Night Tales Presents Version Excursion - Selected by Don Letts

Compilation album by Don Letts
- Released: 24 September 2021
- Genre: Reggae; dub
- Label: Night Time Stories
- Producer: Don Letts

Late Night Tales chronology
Late Night Tales: Jordan Rakei (2021)	Late Night Tales Presents Version Excursion (2021)	Late Night Tales presents After Dark: Vespertine (2023)

Late Night Tales Presents Version Excursion - Selected by Don Letts is a DJ mix album curated by British DJ Don Letts for the Late Night Tales series, released by Night Time Stories on 24 September 2021. It features cover songs by reggae/dub artists such as Dennis Bovell, John Holt, Ash Walker, Cornell Campbell, Khruangbin, Mad Professor, Will Holland, Gentleman's Dub Club, and The Tamlins of music by artists from a wide range of eras and genres, such as The Beach Boys, The Beatles, Nina Simone, Marvin Gaye, The Bee Gees, Kool & The Gang, The Clash, and Joy Division, among many others.

== Reception ==
Sam Easterbook of Buzz wrote about the album, "While it can veer into novelty, the mix is immaculate and is packed with exclusives. Bit of a shame it didn’t come out at the start of the summer really."

== Track listing ==
No.	Title	Writer(s)	Performer(s)	Length
1.	"Hercules (North Street West 'Late Night Tales' Dub)"	Aaron Neville	Ghetto Priest	4:12
2.	"Black Rabbit"	Jefferson Airplane	Prince Fatty & Shniece McMenamin	3:50
3.	"Dub in the Supermarket (Exclusive remix)"	The Clash	Wrongtom Meets the Rockers	3:39
4.	"E=MC2 (Exclusive track)"	Big Audio Dynamite	Gaudi Meets the Rebel Dread ft. Emily Capell	5:08
5.	"Superstylin' (Exclusive remix)"	Groove Armada	Rude Boy	4:39
6.	"Love Will Tear Us Apart (Full Vocal Dub; exclusive remix)"	Joy Division	Capitol 1212 ft. Earl 16	3:46
7.	"All I Do Is Think About You (Far East Dub; exclusive remix)"	Tammi Terrell	Quantic Presenta Flowering Inferno	3:21
8.	"Caroline, No"	The Beach Boys	Zoe Devlin Love ft. Tim Hutton	2:41
9.	"You'll Never Find Another Love Like Mine (Mad Professor 2021 Dub; exclusive remix)"	Lou Rawls	John Holt	3:53
10.	"Ital City Dub (Exclusive remix)"	Marvin Gaye	Cornell Campbell	3:07
11.	"(I Can't Get Enough Of) That Reggae Stuff (Dennis Bovell Remix; exclusive remix)"	Kool & the Gang	Matumbi	3:53
12.	"Use Me (Ben McKone Dub)"	Bill Withers	Gentleman's Dub Club ft. Kiko Bun	4:31
13.	"Uptown Top Ranking"	Althea and Donna	Black Box Recorder	3:24
14.	"Sixteen Tons of Dub"	Merle Travis	OBF	1:53
15.	"Ain't No Sunshine (Space Dub Mix; exclusive remix)"	Bill Withers	Yasushi Ide	2:46
16.	"Baltimore"	Randy Newman	The Tamlins	4:30
17.	"Emotion (Dennis Bovell Remix; exclusive remix)"	Samantha Sang	15 16 17	4:21
18.	"There's Nothing Like This (Exclusive track)"	Omar	Ash Walker	3:24
19.	"Slippin' into Darkness"	War	The Senior Allstars	4:13
20.	"Within You Without You"	The Beatles	Easy Star All-Stars	5:05
21.	"Dern Kala (Khruangbin Dub Mix)"	Khruangbin	Khruangbin	4:09
