= Session Victim =

German musical duo

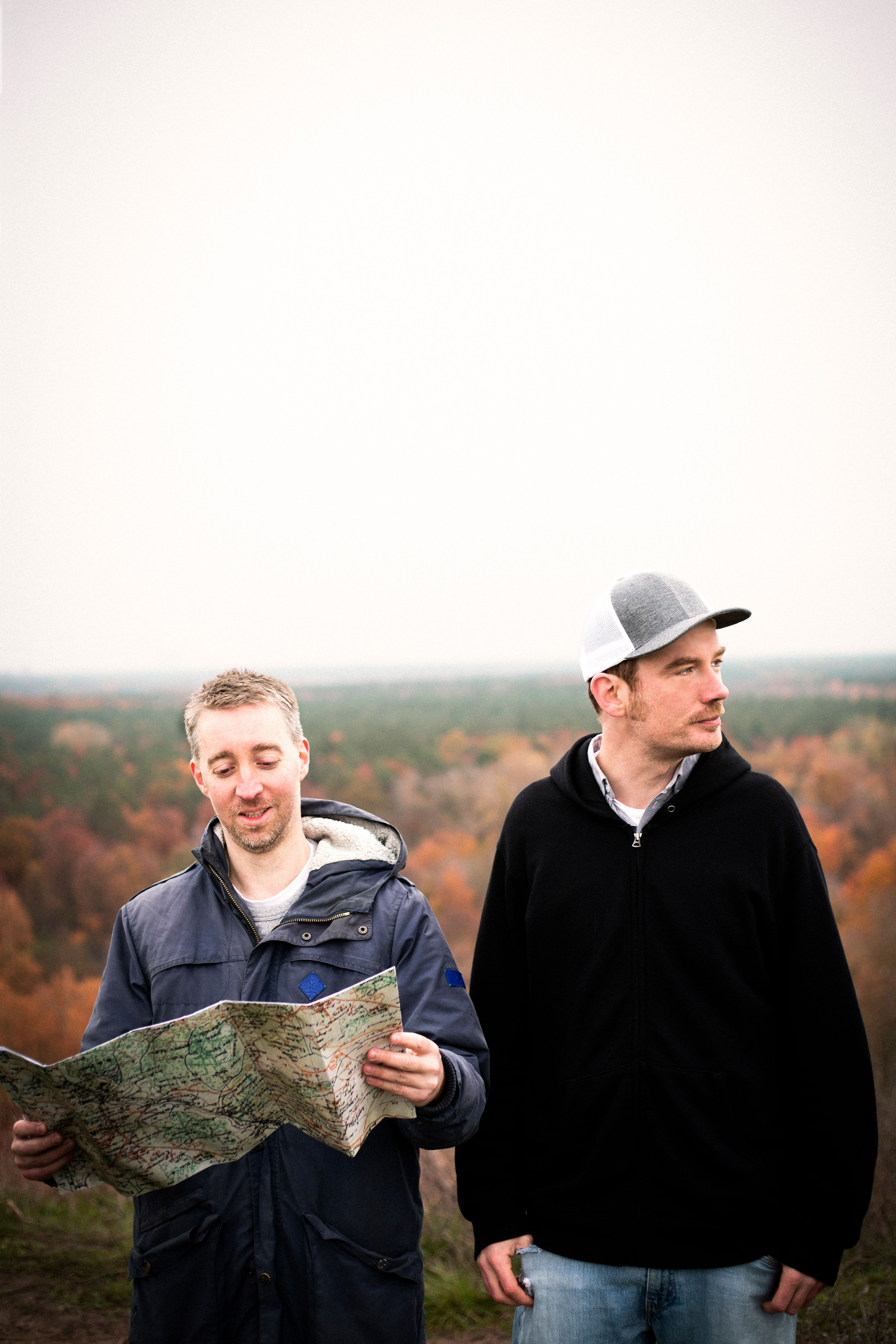
- Session Victim in 2019

Background information
- Origin: Lüneburg, Germany
- Genres: House
- Years active: 2007–present
- Labels: Night Time Stories; Delusions of Grandeur; Pen & Paper
- Members: Hauke Freer; Matthias Reiling

Session Victim are a house music duo formed in 2007 in Lüneburg, Germany by Hauke Freer and Matthias Reiling. Known for their vinyl-only DJ sets and hardware-based live shows, they have released five studio albums: The Haunted House Of House (2012), See You When You Get There (2014) and Listen To Your Heart (2017) on Delusions of Grandeur, and Needledrop (2020) and low key, low pressure (2023) on Night Time Stories.

== History ==
Hauke Freer and Matthias Reiling grew and met in Lüneburg, Germany, where they organized parties and club nights with non-commercial music, as there was no one else who was organizing such parties at the time. They hung out at a local record store where they listened to all the new records that were coming in. Eventually, they started to DJ together in 1997. In 2001, they left their hometown, with Freer moving to Berlin, and Reiling moving to Hamburg. Reiling became involved in Hamburg's hardcore metal scene as a member of Two Tribes, while Freer became involved in label management, setting up his labels Retreat and Quarion.

In 2007, the duo reconnected under the name Session Victim and released their debut EP, No Friends, on the following year. In 2012, they signed with Jimpster's record label Delusions of Grandeur, under which they released three studio albums: The Haunted House Of House (2012), See You When You Get There (2014) and Listen To Your Heart (2017). In 2020, they signed with Night Time Stories and released their fourth studio album, Needledrop. The album includes vocals from Beth Hirsch.

== Production and live performances ==
Session Victim's music has been described as "a succinct mix of smooth, jazz infused house, atmospheric balearic groove and soulful hip hop" by DJ Mag. They also sample soul, funk and disco.

Band member Hauke Freer described the creative process behind their albums:

Sometimes there are certain things we consciously like to get into and emphasize conceptually. And sometimes it's just not like that at all and every day in the studio feels like a new blind date with our sequencer.

— Hauke Freer

Session Victim's gear includes Korg Trident, Korg Minilogue, Roland R-8, and LinnDrum. They used their friend's Roland JX-3P for See You When You Get There and Listen To Your Heart. Their effects units include Moogerfooger delay and Strymon Big Sky. Matthias Reiling used Protracker on the Amiga 500 on his early career; now he also uses an Akai S612 and Ensoniq ASR-10. Session Victim have used Ableton Live in the last decade of their career. They have ditched most audio plug-ins as they find them more distracting than helpful. They derive their drum sounds either from sampling drums or from drum machines; they don't possess drum kits. They always construct drums on their music from scratch, use very little processing, and avoid digital drum libraries. Reiling's gear includes an ESP Precision bass guitar.

Finding the right samples from various records is crucial to Session Victim's production work. They consider themselves very picky when selecting record stores in which they will discover new records to sample from.

Session Victim are known for their vinyl-only DJ sets and hardware-based live shows, which include Volca Beats and Roland TR-707 drum machines, a Roland SE-02 analog synthesizer, and bass guitar. For their live performances, they break their arrangements down into little loops and spread them over their 12 channels and pads, building a live arrangement. Previously, they used to practice the original song arrangement.

== Discography ==
=== Studio albums ===
- The Haunted House of House (2012)
- See You When You Get There (2014)
- Listen to Your Heart (2017)
- Needledrop (2020)
- low key, low pressure (2023)
