= Late Night Tales: Jordan Rakei =

2021 compilation album

Compilation album by Jordan Rakei
- Released: 9 April 2021
- Genre: Soul; jazz; alternative R&B; trip hop
- Label: Night Time Stories
- Producer: Jordan Rakei

Jordan Rakei chronology
Origin (2019)	Late Night Tales: Jordan Rakei (2021)

Late Night Tales chronology
Late Night Tales: Khruangbin (2020)	Late Night Tales: Jordan Rakei (2021)	Late Night Tales Presents Version Excursion (2021)

Late Night Tales: Jordan Rakei is a DJ mix album curated by New Zealand-Australian musician Jordan Rakei for Late Night Tales series, released by Night Time Stories on 9 April 2021. It marks the 20th anniversary of the series. It includes cover versions of Radiohead's "Codex" and Jeff Buckley's "Lover, You Should've Come Over", and an original song by Rakei, "Imagination".

== Background ==
Jordan Rakei has said that in this album he tried to "distil a series of relaxing moments" and also "help [his] friends’ stuff get into the world." He chose songs from artists he grew up or collaborated with which influenced his music." The album features artists such as Charlotte Day Wilson, Connan Mockasin, Joe Armon-Jones, and C Duncan.

== Reception ==
The album received favorable reviews. Josh Abraham of Clash wrote, "[Late Night Tales: Jordan Rakei is] an all-round beauty of an album. The 17 track production is clean-cut, but knows exactly how to keep the listener intrigued", and "it’s the perfect cocktail of forgetting about the current climate". Tania Ogier of Backseat Mafia wrote, "Rakei’s wonderfully layered sound is testament to his talent as a gifted songwriter", and "the collective narrative of the 17 tracks flows as a relaxing, meditative soundscape – at times kooky and chaotic, then soulfully therapeutic".

== Track listing ==
1. "Covering Your Tracks" – DJ Fink
2. "Mulago" – Alfa Mist
3. "Mountains" – Charlotte Day Wilson
4. "Count a Heart" – Moreton & Jordan Rakei
5. "Untitled 2" – Puma Blue
6. "Momo's" – Connan Mockasin
7. "He Came from the Sun" – C Duncan
8. "Virtual U" – Oso Leone
9. "Idiom" – Joe Armon–Jones & Maxwell Owin feat. Oscar Jerome
10. "Everternity" – Snowpoet
11. "Always & Forever" – Maro
12. "Speak Up" – Homay Chmitz
13. "Singularity" – Bill Laurance
14. "Lover, You Should've Come Over" – Jordan Rakei (Jeff Buckley exclusive cover version)
15. "Codex" – Jordan Rakei (Radiohead exclusive cover version)
16. "Counterpart" – Cubicolour
17. "Imagination" – Jordan Rakei (exclusive new track)
18. "Imagination" – Alejandro González Iñárritu (exclusive spoken word)
