= Needle drop =

Needle drop may refer to:

- Needle drop (DJing), a technique used by DJs
- Needle drop (audio), a version of a music album that has been transferred from a vinyl record to digital audio
- "Needledrop" (Space Ghost Coast to Coast), a television episode
- The Needle Drop, a blog/vlog created and run by music critic Anthony Fantano
- Needledrop (album), a 2020 album by Session Victim
