= Mr. White =

Mr. White may refer to:

- Mr. White (comics), the Marvel Comics character
- "Mr. White" a song by Khruangbin from their 2015 album The Universe Smiles upon You
- Mr. Black Mr. White, a Bollywood film
- Mr. White (James Bond), a James Bond character
- Lawrence Dimmick, a character from the film Reservoir Dogs (known as Mr. White)
- Walter White (Breaking Bad), a fictional character in the American television drama series Breaking Bad, also known as Mr. White

== See also ==
- White (surname)
