= Late Night Tales: Khruangbin =

Compilation album by Khruangbin
- Released: 4 December 2020
- Genre: Psychedelic rock; Korean rock; Nigerian reggae; Latin pop; world music; rhythm and blues
- Label: Night Time Stories
- Producer: Khruangbin

Khruangbin chronology
Mordechai (2020)	Late Night Tales: Khruangbin (2020)	Ali (2022)

Late Night Tales chronology
Late Night Tales: Hot Chip (2020)	Late Night Tales: Khruangbin (2020)	Late Night Tales: Jordan Rakei (2021)

Late Night Tales: Khruangbin is a DJ mix album curated by American psychedelia band Khruangbin for Late Night Tales series, released by Night Time Stories on 4 December 2020. It includes Khruangbin's cover of Kool & the Gang's instrumental tune "Summer Madness".

The compilation includes a mixture of various global artists outside of the mainstream music, including South Korean rock band Sanulrim, Belarus band Pesniary, Nigerian musician Maxwell Udoh, and Ethiopian band Roha Band, among others. The spoken-word track "Where Did You Go (Transmission For Jehn)" is a banjo arrangement of the Gnossienne No. 1 by composer Eric Satie.

== Track listing ==
1. "Illuminations" - Carlos Santana & Alice Coltrane
2. "I Know That (When The Springtime Comes)" - Brillantes Del Vuelo
3. "Khushi" - Nazia Hassan
4. "DRM" - Kelly Doyle
5. "가지마(Don’t Go)" - 산울림(Sanulrim)
6. "I Like It" - Maxwell Udoh
7. "Enseñame" - David Marez
8. "Feel The Love Reprise" - Gerald Lee
9. "Still You" - Justine & The Victorian Punks
10. "「祭ばやしが聞こえる」のテーマ" (Theme for Festival Past) - George Yanagi & Nadja Band
11. "Зачарованная моя"(My Enchanted) - Песняры
12. "Summer Madness" - Khruangbin (Exclusive Kool & the Gang cover)
13. "Contigo" - Paloma San Basilio
14. "Yetikimt Abeba" - Roha Band
15. "Where Did You Go (Transmission For Jehn)" (Exclusive Spoken Word Track) - Tierney Malone & Geoffrey Muller
