= A La Sala =

Studio album by Khruangbin
- Released: April 5, 2024
- Length: 39:31
- Labels: Dead Oceans; Night Time Stories
- Producers: Mark Speer; Steve Christensen

Khruangbin chronology
Ali (2022)	A La Sala (2024)	The Universe Smiles Upon You II (2025)

Singles from A La Sala
- 1. "A Love International" Released: January 16, 2024; 2. "May Ninth" Released: February 20, 2024; 3. "Pon Pón" Released: March 19, 2024

A La Sala (transl. "To the Living Room") is the fourth studio album by American musical trio Khruangbin. It was released on April 5, 2024, through Dead Oceans and Night Time Stories.

== Background ==
On the album's title, Laura Lee has said "'A La Sala,' I used to scream it around my house when I was a little girl, to get everybody in the living room; to get my family together. That's kind of what recording the new album felt like. Emotionally there was a desire to get back to square-one between the three of us, to where we came from–in sonics and in feeling." The album is the band's first without any additional collaborators.

== Release ==
On January 16, 2024, the trio announced the album along with its lead single, "A Love International". The single released alongside a music video directed by Scott Dungate. On January 29, 2024, the trio announced the North American A La Sala Tour in support of the album. Hermanos Gutiérrez, John Carroll Kirby, Peter Cat Recording Co., Men I Trust, and Arooj Aftab joined the tour as openers. The tour began on April 14, 2024, in Indio and concluded on October 10, 2024, in New Orleans.

On February 20, 2024, the album's second single "May Ninth" was released. An animated music video produced by Nathaniel Murphy, Jenny Lucia Mascia, and Jeremy Higgins was released alongside the single. The album's third single, "Pon Pón", was released on March 19, 2024. A music video for "Hold Me Up (Thank You)" was released on April 5, 2024.

On January 13, 2025, the trio announced an extension to the A La Sala Tour, beginning on February 20, 2025, in Christchurch and concluding on September 14, 2025, in Louisville. Troy Kingi & The Galactic Chiropractors, Hermanos Gutiérrez, Helado Negro, TV on the Radio, and John Carroll Kirby supported the tour extension as openers. The trio also released a music video for "Pon Pón" filmed at a show during the 2024 leg of the tour.

== Critical reception ==
Professional ratings
Aggregate scores
Source	Rating
AnyDecentMusic?	7.4/10
Metacritic	76/100
Review scores
Source	Rating
AllMusic	3.5/5 stars
The Arts Desk	5/5 stars
Exclaim!	8/10
Financial Times	3/5 stars
MusicOMH	4/5 stars
NME	4/5 stars
The Observer	4/5 stars
Pitchfork	7.1/10
The Skinny	4/5 stars
Spin	A

According to the review aggregator Metacritic, A La Sala received "generally favorable reviews" based on a weighted average score of 76 out of 100 from 17 critic scores. Aggregator AnyDecentMusic? gave it 7.4 out of 10, based on their assessment of the critical consensus.

Ammar Kalia of The Observer wrote that "each member displays a subtle mastery of their instrument" on the album. Writing for Exclaim!, Oliver Crook wrote that the album was "endlessly rewarding". AllMusic's Paul Simpson described the album as "Khruangbin's most stripped-down effort since their debut." On the album's production, Thomas Smith of NME wrote that "each song is appropriately seasoned with dubby beats, field recordings, hooky guitar riffs and basslines, all distinct enough to pique your attention but never dominating space." Jem Aswad of Variety writes that the album "dial[s] back the vocals and mak[es] the grooves and sound even more low-key." Nick Seip of Slant Magazine described the album as "largely a retread of Khruangbin's idiosyncratic brand of dubby psychedelia."

Writing for The Skinny, Jamie Wilde's review described the album as "sunshine in music form and "another stellar addition to Khruangbin's blissful repertoire." Evan Haga of Spin wrote that the band's "performances are so good, in fact, you sometimes want to divide them into stems." In his review for The Arts Desk, Joe Muggs writes that the album is "rooted in time and space, in the physicality of the musicians playing the sounds, and in the lines of connection and influence that brought them to this precise moment." In a Financial Times' review, Arwa Haider wrote that "Khruangbin effortlessly lock into their mid-tempo grooves, though they also seem reluctant to break out of them."

=== Year-end lists ===
Select year-end rankings for A La Sala
Publication/critic	Accolade	Rank	Ref.
Les Inrocks	100 meilleurs albums de 2024	23	
PopMatters	The 80 Best Albums of 2024	67	
Under the Radar	Top 100 Albums of 2024	66	
Uproxx	The Best Albums Of 2024	—N/a	
WXPN	Albums of the Year	15	

=== Awards ===
Awards and nominations for A La Sala
Year	Ceremony	Category	Result	Ref.
2025	2025 Libera Awards	Best Outlier Record	Won	
2025	2025 Libera Awards	Creative Packaging	Nominated	
2025	2025 Libera Awards	Marketing Genius	Nominated	

== Track listing ==
All tracks are written by Laura Lee, Mark Speer, and Donald "DJ" Johnson.

A La Sala track listing
No.	Title	Length
1.	"Fifteen Fifty-Three"	4:07
2.	"May Ninth"	3:12
3.	"Ada Jean"	3:19
4.	"Farolim de Felgueiras"	2:00
5.	"Pon Pón"	2:58
6.	"Todavía Viva"	4:23
7.	"Juegos y Nubes"	2:04
8.	"Hold Me Up (Thank You)"	3:49
9.	"Caja de la Sala"	1:49
10.	"Three from Two"	3:34
11.	"A Love International"	4:15
12.	"Les Petits Gris"	4:01
Total length:		39:31

== Personnel ==
Khruangbin

- Donald "DJ" Johnson – drums, vocals, arrangement
- Laura Lee – bass, vocals, arrangement
- Mark Speer – guitar, vocals, production, arrangement

Additional contributors

- Steve Christensen – production
- Chris Longwood – mastering
- Nick Scott – art direction
- Tiny Frees – creative direction, layout

== Charts ==
Chart performance for A La Sala
Chart (2024)	Peak position
Australian Albums (ARIA)	14
Austrian Albums (Ö3 Austria)	28
Belgian Albums (Ultratop Flanders)	3
Belgian Albums (Ultratop Wallonia)	25
Danish Albums (Hitlisten)	29
Dutch Albums (Album Top 100)	6
French Albums (SNEP)	87
German Albums (Offizielle Top 100)	2
Irish Albums (IRMA)	80
Japanese Hot Albums (Billboard Japan)	50
New Zealand Albums (RMNZ)	14
Portuguese Albums (AFP)	16
Scottish Albums (Official Charts)	7
Spanish Albums (Promusicae)	79
Swedish Albums (Sverigetopplistan)	44
Swiss Albums (Schweizer Hitparade)	7
UK Albums (Official Charts)	18
UK Independent Albums (Official Charts)	4
US Billboard 200	38
