= Astronaut (Ash Walker album) =

Studio album by Ash Walker
- Released: 30 June 2023
- Genre: Jazz; blues; soul; funk; reggae
- Length: 38:09
- Label: Night Time Stories

Ash Walker chronology
Aquamarine (2019)	Astronaut (2023)

Astronaut is the fourth studio album by the London-based musician and DJ Ash Walker, released by Night Time Stories on 30 June 2023. It features contributions by Lou Rhodes, Andrew Ashong, Amp Fiddler, Joe Armon-Jones, and Yazz Ahmed, among others.

== Background ==
Ash Walker wrote the album on different locations with a number of sessions musicians and collaborators. He almost finished working on the album by 2020 but wasn't happy with the mixes, so he invited a friend to help him with EQ and decided to replace a track. He has described his recording technique on Astronaut as an "anti-sound engineer" approach because he thinks that "[sitting] for weeks and months trying to iron out bits of white noise or EQing this and that" detracts him from his vision about how the album should sound.

Walker described the concept of the album:

Philosophically, I guess it's just my way of navigating through the landscape we're all in. I wasn't trying to go too much into the typical perception of an astronaut going into space – I just wanted to create this ethereal journey of sound, full of textures and flavours.

— Ash Walker

== Reception ==
John-Paul Shiver of Treble wrote, "For some, the ideology of stretching across decades of musical ideas reaching from Duke Ellington to King Tubby, Pete Rock to Curtis Mayfield would just short-circuit some arrangers' brainwave activity. But Mr. Walker has the first concept down right that sees his herculean projects of putting soul into this time-traveling entity come to fruition without exception", and "Walker and his laundry list of experts—Andrew Ashong, Ebi Soda, Oscar Jerome, Joe Armon-Jones, Yazz Ahmed and Kennebec—bunker down for the dignified arrangements, an school Quincy Jones feeling, that I can attest will stick with you for days, weeks, seasons and most definitely years."

Chris May of All About Jazz wrote that although Astronaut "is by no stretch of the imagination a 'jazz' album, [...it] is likely to find part of its audience among open-eared jazz aficionados, particularly those tuned into the London underground jazz scene with which Walker is loosely affiliated. [...] Astronaught is best approached via the eclectic route adopted by Walker."

== Track listing ==
1. "Only Love" (featuring Lou Rhodes)
2. "Letting Go" (featuring Andrew Ashong)
3. "Afronaut" (featuring Amp Fiddler & Laville)
4. "Babylonian Triangle of Captivity" (featuring Ebi Soda)
5. "Time Gets Wasted" (featuring Sly5thAve & Denitia)
6. "Automation" (featuring Oscar Jerome & Joe Armon-Jones)
7. "Running Away" (featuring Yazz Ahmed & Laville)
8. "Petrol Head" (featuring Laville)
9. "Detroit Velvet Smooth" (featuring Yazz Ahmed)
10. "Jupiter" (featuring Kennebec)
