= Needledrop (album) =

Studio album by Session Victim
- Released: 6 March 2020
- Genre: Downtempo; trip hop; jazz; electronica; house
- Length: 36:34
- Label: Night Time Stories
- Producer: Session Victim

Session Victim chronology
Dawn (2019)	Needledrop (2020)

Needledrop is the fourth studio album by the German house music duo Session Victim, released by Night Time Stories on 6 March 2020.

== Background ==
Session Victim conceived and started recording Needledrop in the basement studio of one of their friends in Sydney. They also moved around Hamburg and San Francisco while recording it.

Needledrop is mostly a downtempo album inspired by the likes of Nightmares on Wax, DJ Shadow and Portishead. It also features genres such as soul, jazz, funk, and house. For this album, Session Victim relied more on live instrumentation than on sampling, using drums, guitar, percussion, piano, flute and saxophone, among others. Electronic instruments the band used in Needledrop include synthesizers Korg Trident and Korg Minilogue, and drum machines Roland R-8 and LinnDrum. The album features Beth Hirsch on "Made Me Fly".

== Reception ==
Needledrop received favorable reviews. Ryan Keeling of Resident Advisor wrote that the album "arrives in fresh home-listening forms. [...] Freer and Reiling create a musical environment in which the tone and timbre of many different instruments fit comfortably. [...] They continue to bring a sense of style and musicality that's uncommon among similar house music acts. Transposing the essence of what they do to a range of new tempos and rhythms is admirable. For this reason alone, Needledrop should be considered a success." Ryan Middleton of Magnetic Magazine wrote that Needledrop "feels organic and complex, as [Session Victim] bring together live instruments, drums, guitars, percussion, vocals and more, into a record that bridges various genre gaps." Sam Willings of MusicTech wrote, "If some of [Session Victim's] previous works are designed for the night, Needledrop is surely a soundtrack for the sunset", and "Needledrop expertly balances organic and synthetic sounds in a downbeat fashion". Harold Heath of International DJ wrote, "Needledrop performs that rare trick of glowing with nostalgia while simultaneously sounding completely contemporary."

== Track listing ==
1. "Bad Weather Mates"
2. "The Pain"
3. "Made Me Fly" (feat Beth Hirsch)
4. "Jazzbeat 7"
5. "No Sky, Blue Sound"
6. "Waller and Pierce"
7. "Needledrop"
8. "Isle of Taste"
9. "Cold Chills"
10. "Still High"
11. "Glimmer"
