= Roland R-5 =

Drum machine

- Manufacturer: Roland
- Dates: 1989 - 1996
- Price: $899

Technical specifications
- Polyphony: 32
- Timbrality: 16
- Synthesis type: ROM

Input/output
- External control: 1/4" Phone Jack, Stereo Main, Stereo 2, Stereo 3, Stereo Headphone

The R-5 Human Rhythm Composer is an electronic drum machine introduced in 1989 by Roland Corporation, using PCM voices. The R-5 features velocity- and pressure-sensitive trigger pads, and the ability to create loops of beats. The pads are assignable and can be user defined for different sounds and also for different amplitude and semi-tones within each sample.

The R-5 is the smaller sibling of the Roland R-8 which had more sounds and features than the R-5.

== Sounds ==
It featured 68 internal voices such as: Electronic Kick, Jazz Snare, Rimshot, Electronic Snare, Brush Roll Snare, Electronic Toms, Timbale, Bongo, and Slap Bass.

== Notable Users ==
- Autechre
- Orbital
- Underworld
- 808 State
- Human League
- Miki Berenyi
- Puce Mary
- Bis
