= Augmented 7th =

Studio album by Ash Walker
- Released: 2015
- Genre: Dub; reggae; jazz; trip hop; electronica; downtempo
- Label: Deep Heads
- Producer: Ash Walker

Ash Walker chronology
Augmented 7th (2015)	Echo Chamber (2017)

Augmented 7th is the debut album of the London-based musician and DJ, Ash Walker. It was released in 2015 through the independent record label Deep Heads. The album features a diverse range of genres, such as dub, reggae, jazz, trip-hop, and electronica.

== Background ==
Augmented 7th featured Segilola on vocals, Nikolaj Torp Larsen from The Specials on melodica, and Deep Heads' founder Zeb Samuels. It includes a diverse range of genres, such as dub, reggae, jazz, trip-hop, and downtempo electronica. The album featured 4 tracks from Walker's Agnostic EP, which was critically acclaimed by the radio DJ Gilles Peterson. The name of the album refers to the augmented seventh chord, a popular chord in jazz.

== Reception ==
Augmented 7th received favorable reviews. Paul Scott-Bates of Louder Than War wrote, "[Walker] seems from the evidence here to be able to adapt to almost any musical genre", and "His past works with the likes of Lee "Scratch" Perry, David Rodigan and The Specials have obviously been big influences and his ability to craft often quite brilliant music has to be applauded." He criticized the "slightly annoying replication of a crackling vinyl record". Lexis from Music is My Sanctuary wrote, "My first thought was how long it had been since I had been remotely excited about a downtempo record", and "What sets Augmented 7th apart from most records in the genre is musicianship and various mixtures of musical influences."

== Track listing ==
1. "Cote De Boeuf"
2. "Bamboo Circus" (feat Segilola)
3. "Round the Twist" (feat Nikolaj Torp Larsen)
4. "They Do Not Know Yet"
5. "Six Eight"
6. "Noodle"
7. "Long Arms"
8. "Come On Board"
9. "All That You Are" (Zeb Samuels & Rowl feat Segilola; Ash Walker remix)
10. "Root Vegetables"
11. "Blue Veins" (feat Zeb Samuels)
12. "The Slopes"
13. "Lost Cranium" (Ash Walker & Zeb Samuels)
