= Steve Christensen =

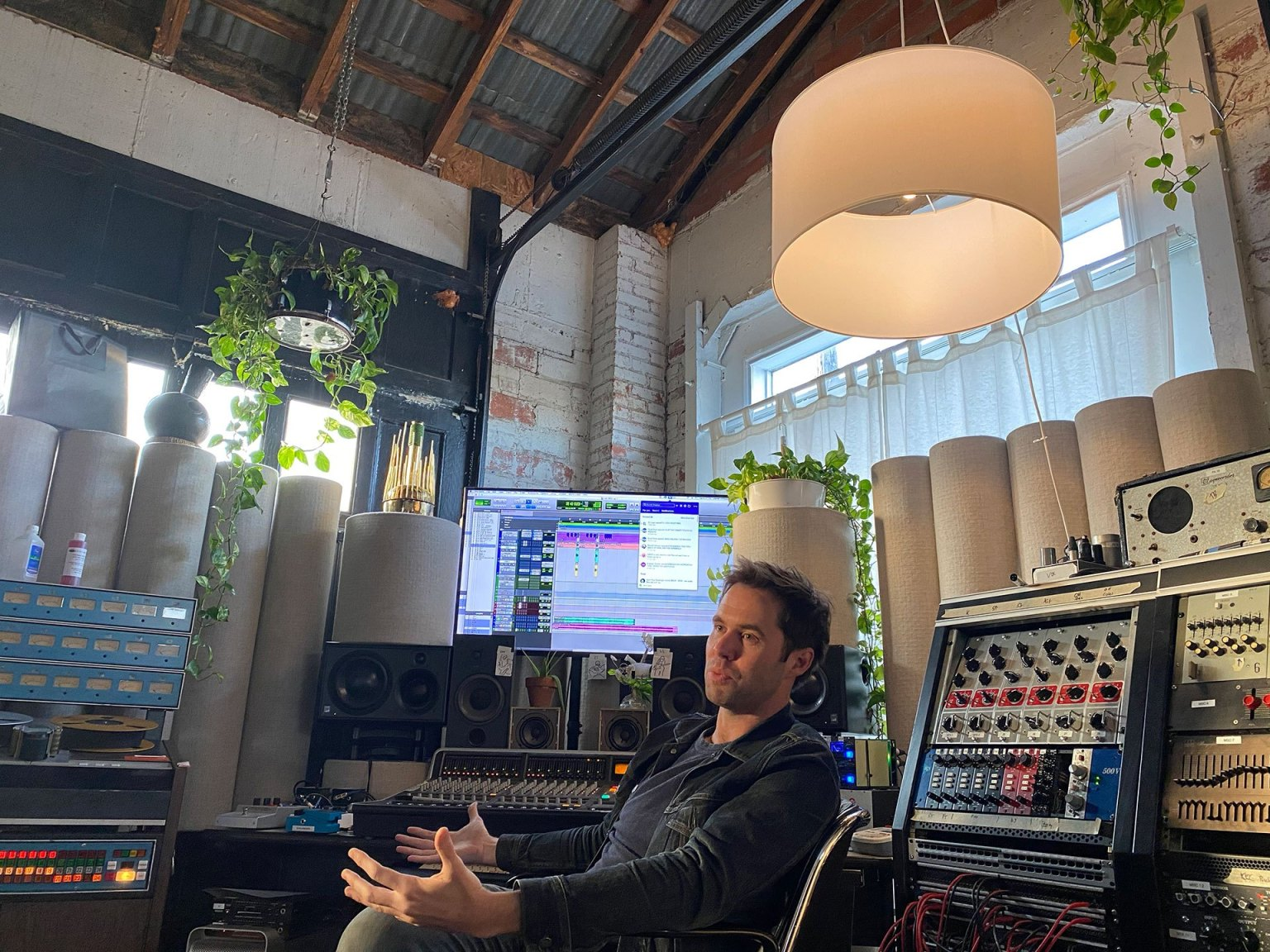
- Christensen at recording studio in Houston, Texas

Background information
- Born: April 23, 1978 (age 48); Overland Park, Kansas, United States
- Genres: Rock, Pop, Folk, Americana
- Occupations: Audio engineer, Mixing engineer, record producer, musician
- Instruments: Bass, guitar
- Years active: 1998 to present
- Website: www.mixingandcats.com

Steve Christensen (born April 23, 1978) is an American recording engineer, record producer and musician.

== Career ==
Christensen began his recording career in Houston, Texas at SugarHill Recording Studios in 1998 as an intern and quickly moved up to lead engineer by 2000. His work includes international touring as live sound engineer for Destiny's Child and studio albums by Jermaine Dupri, Cash Money Records, Steve Earle, Khruangbin and Robert Ellis. Christensen operates his own studio in downtown Houston, Texas.

== Awards and nominations ==
- Grammy Award for Best Contemporary Folk Album: 2009, for Steve Earle – "Townes"

== Selected discography ==
Year	Title	Artist	Credits
2024	A La Sala	Khruangbin	Audio engineer, Mixing engineer, record producer
2022	Ali	Khruangbin & Vieux Farka Touré	Audio engineer, Mixing engineer, record producer
2022	Texas Moon	Khruangbin	Audio engineer, Mixing engineer, record producer
2020	Mordechai	Khruangbin	Audio engineer, Mixing engineer, record producer
2020	Texas Sun	Khruangbin & Leon Bridges	Audio engineer, Mixing engineer, record producer
2018	Con Todo el Mundo	Khruangbin	Audio engineer, Mixing engineer, record producer
2017	Transient Lullaby	The Mastersons	Audio engineer, Mixing engineer
2017	I Got Your Medicine	Shinyribs	Audio engineer, Mixing engineer
2016	Revelations of a Mind Unraveling	Lincoln Durham	Audio engineer, Mixing engineer
2016	Robert Ellis	Robert Ellis	Audio engineer
2015	The Universe Smiles Upon You	Khruangbin	Audio engineer, Mixing engineer, record producer
2012	Cabin Fever	Corb Lund	Audio engineer, Mixing engineer, record producer
2011	Photographs	Robert Ellis	Audio engineer, Mixing engineer, record producer
2009	Townes	Steve Earle	Audio engineer
