= Leifur James =

British musician

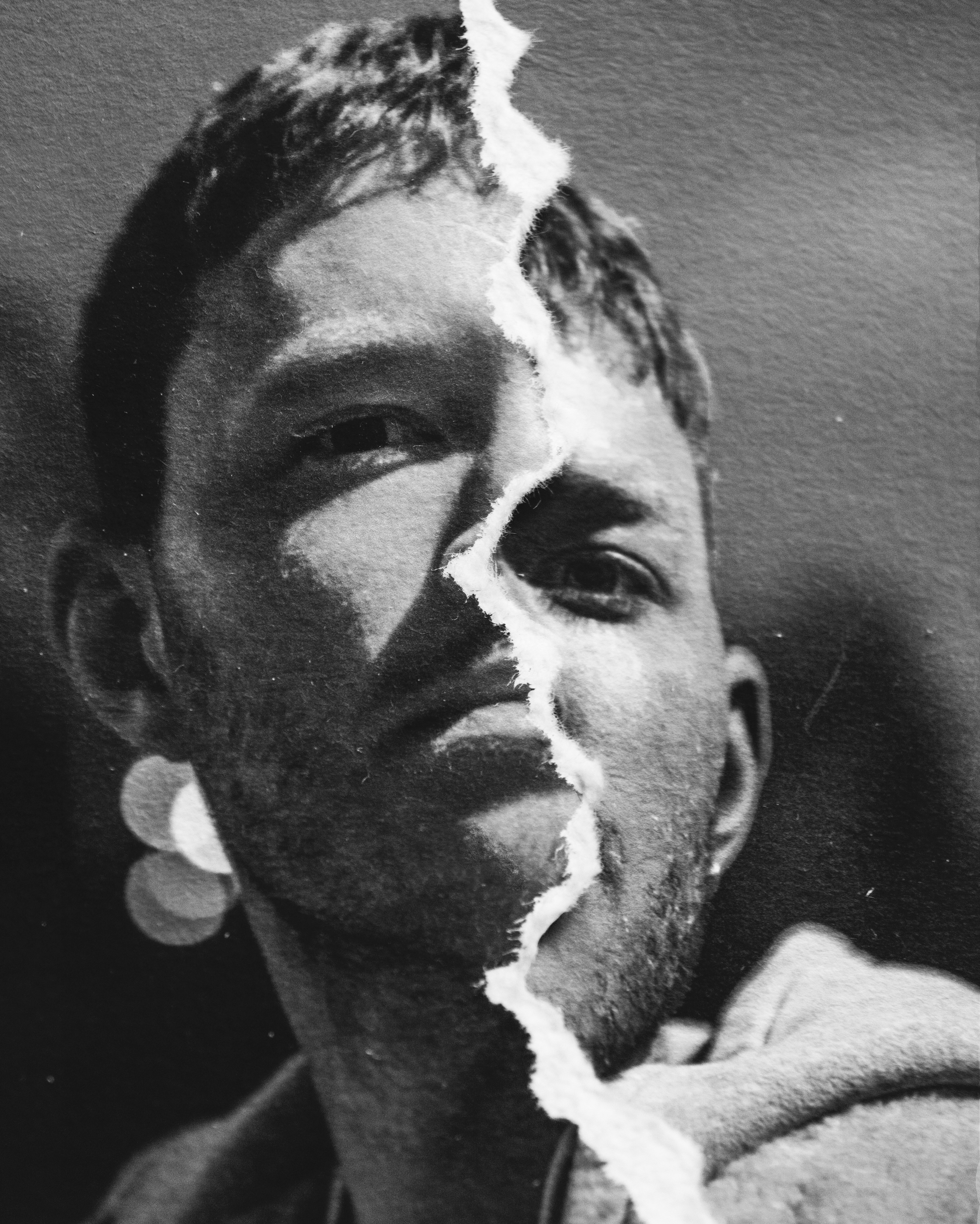

Background information
- Born: London, UK
- Genres: Electronic; experimental; avant-garde
- Occupations: Composer, electronic music producer
- Label: Night Time Stories
- Website: leifurjames.com

Leifur James is an English record producer and composer known for his esoteric avant-garde style. In 2018, his critically acclaimed debut album A Louder Silence was released on Night Time Stories, which was followed by a second album Angel In Disguise in June 2020. He released his third album Magic Seeds in November 2024.

== Career ==
James debuted with A Louder Silence in 2018. Support on the airwaves came from radio presenters Tom Ravenscroft, Mary Anne Hobbs and Gilles Peterson on BBC6 Music, Young Turks label show on NTS and Bradley Zero & Charlie Bones on Worldwide FM. Soon after the album a remix EP was released, with remixes from Bruce, FaltyDL and Whities producer Coby Sey. The album was praised by music publications Resident Advisor, Pitchfork, Mixmag, Electronic Sound, Future Music UK.

In February 2020, James announced his follow-up album Angel of Disguise on Night Time Stories. Leading up the release of Angel In Disguise, British electronic music magazine DJ Mag premiered the album's fourth single Ritual describing the track as feeling "indebted to Burial’s nightbus-tailored garage, while wavering synth cries and cinematic pianos". A very well received album was chosen as 'Album Of The Month' by Future Music, which called it a "magnificent record" by "a singular artist who revels in playing with boundaries" and a review from Crack Magazine stating that "Angel In Disguise certainly demonstrates James' skill as a producer". Upon the album's full release, Vinyl Factory dubbed it as "melancholic electronica."

James collaborated on a visual project with Hungarian director, Balázs Simon. Premiered on Boiler Room's '4:3' platform. Wurlitzer was then nominated for a UK Music Video Award. The masterful blend of James' harmonic vocals and Simon's powerful visuals earned the duo widespread support from CLASH Magazine, Director's Notes, Motionographer, the London Short Film Festival and the UK and Berlin Music Video Awards. James later shared a series of photographs with Mixmag to accompany his 'Club Epiphany Tracks' from around the early years of the previous decade (2010s). In an interview with ÂUGHT Magazine leading up to the release of Angel In Disguise, James discussed his musical influences and the importance of his experiences of free thinking while in education and turning an unfortunate event into a blessing.

James has played at festivals including Bluedot, The Great Escape, We Out Here, Sundaze, and Nova Batida. James supported German composer Pantha du Prince at a sold-out concert in the main Barbican Hall before selling out a string of his own live shows across Europe including the Southbank Centre in London. He was set to tour his new live electronic show for the release of Angel In Disguise in May 2020 with intimate shows across the U.K. and mainland Europe, beginning in Copenhagen before heading to Berlin and then finishing in London. His touring schedule has been postponed and is set to resume Autumn 2021.

In 2021, James' music video Angel In Disguise, directed by Balázs Simon, was nominated for Best Experimental at the Berlin Music Video Awards.

== Discography ==
=== Albums ===
- A Louder Silence (2018)
- Angel in Disguise (2020)
- Magic Seeds (2024)
- Magic Seeds II (2025)

=== EPs ===
- A Louder Silence: Remixes (2019)

=== Singles ===
- "Wurlitzer" (2019)
- "Sirens" (2021)
- "Magic Seeds" (2024)
