= Garden City Movement (band) =

Indie pop band

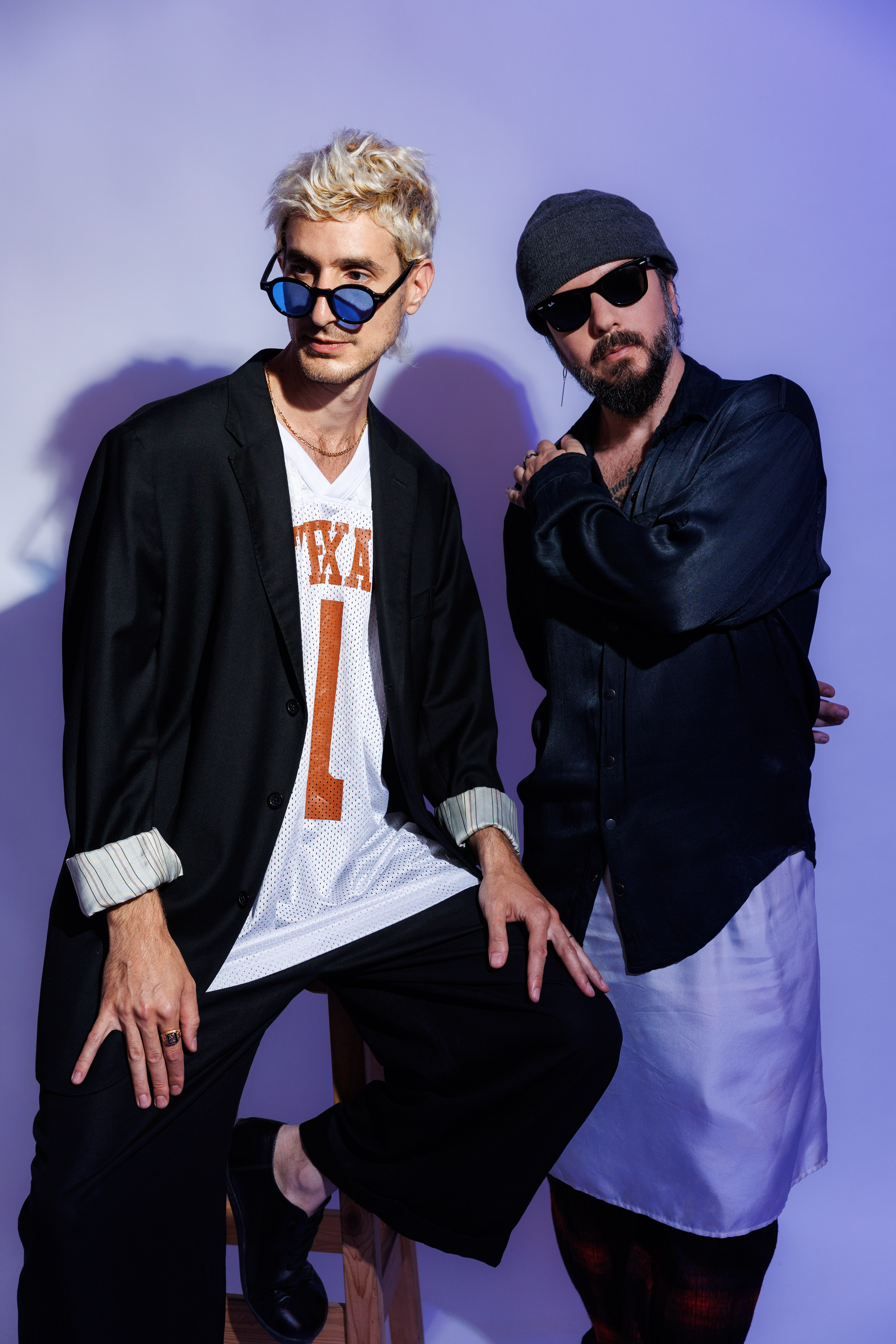
- Garden City Movement (Credit Ben Palhov)

Background information
- Origin: Tel Aviv, Israel
- Genres: Electronic, chillwave, indie pop, trip hop
- Years active: 2013–present
- Labels: BLDG5 Records; Night Time Stories
- Members: Johnny Sharoni; Roi Avital
- Past members: Yoav "Joe" Saar
- Website: bldg5records.com/artist/GARDEN-CITY-MOVEMENT

Garden City Movement is an electronic indie pop band based in Tel Aviv, Israel that formed in 2013. The band consists of Roi Avital (vocals, keyboards, guitar), Joe Saar (guitar, sampler, keyboards) and Johnny Sharoni (vocals, sampler, percussion). They have released one album under the label BLDG5 Records (under license to Night Time Stories) as well as three EPs, two under the label BLDG5 Records and one under The Vinyl Factory and BLDG5 Records.

== History ==
In October 2013, Garden City Movement released their first single "Casa Mila" from the Entertainment EP. The song was first released on the compilation Ground Floor with the official announcement on the label BLDG5 Records and then later released officially as track number one on the Entertainment EP.

In November 2013, the second single "Move On" was released. The song was first revealed on Pitchfork Media music magazine and then followed by dozens of reviews around the blogosphere. Earlier this year "Move On (Teen Daze Remix)" was released on Majestic Casual YouTube channel and considered to be the first release of the band.

Following the second single, the band released the remix of Tropics to the song "Entertainment". The remix was Premiered on Dummymag.

Garden City Movement first full EP was released on November 25, 2013 and followed by signing with Full Spectrum booking agency in Netherlands, Get Your Acts Together booking agency in United Kingdom and Ireland, Ink Music booking agency in Austria and Target Concerts booking agency in Germany.

In December 2013, their first live music clip for the song "The More You Make It" was released on Clash and for the first time the band's faces were revealed to the listeners.

In March 2014, the music video for "Move On" was released on Stereogum. The music video directed by Michael Moshonov, Lael Utnik, Mayan Toledano and edited by Gal Muggia. The music video selected for Los Angeles Film Festival.

On April 26, 2014, Garden City Movement performed on Boiler Room live show in Tel Aviv.

On May 6, 2014, BLDG5 Records revealed a new song of Garden City Movement and announced on a new EP from the band "Bengali Cinema" that would be released in the end of June 2014. The song "Terracotta" premiered on Stereogum and drew international attention.

On June 23, 2014, Garden City Movement released their second EP "Bengali Cinema" was announced first on May 6, 2014 via Stereogum. “The name “Bengali Cinema” is just the expression of a place where you can live life to the maximum. If someone is in love in a Bengali movie nothing else matters and everything will be done to make it happen.”

On June 13, 2014, the second single from the EP, "Bengali Cinema", was released via noisey, A few days later on June 14 and 18, 2014 two more singles was released via Stereogum in an unprecedented manner, as a result three songs out of four was public few days prior official release date. "Bengali Cinema" was also released in a deluxe limited edition (300), Special colored vinyl including the two EP's of the band. This is the first vinyl released by BLDG5 Records. At the same time of the "Bengali Cinema" EP releases BLDG5 Records announced collaboration remix contest with Ninjatune via "NinjaJamm" iPhone app.

On July 28, 2014, after two successful EP's, collaborations, reviews and excellent live Boiler Room show, Garden City Movement announced the worldwide agency Creative Artists Agency as their official booking agency.

On September 14, 2014, Garden City Movement track "Terracotta" was featured on Ninja Tune "Ninja Jamm - EP Bundle 5" alongside Lapalux, Machinedrum, Mr Scruff and more.

On November 17, 2014, Garden City Movement track "Pont des Arts" was released via Stereogum. The song is named after pedestrian bridge in Paris Pont des Arts where young couples traditionally commemorate their love by locking padlocks onto it. Until the official release the band played the song only on live shows.

On February 2, 2015, The Vinyl Factory and BLDG5 Records revealed a new song of Garden City Movement and announced on a new five-track EP from the band "Modern West" that would be released on April 6, 2015 on digital and vinyl formats. The song "My Only Love" premiered on Factmag and drew international attention. The announcement of the new EP marks the beginning of the cooperation between London based label The Vinyl Factory and BLDG5 Records. later on February 26, 2015 "Recollections" the second single form Modern West EP was released via Noisey. In addition, on March 23, 2015 The Vinyl Factory and BLDG5 Records released the third single from "Modern West" EP “When We Had It Easy” via Stereogum.

On March 16, 2018, the band released their first full album Apollonia.

== Band members ==
- Johnny Sharoni - vocals, sampler, percussion
- Roi Avital - vocals, keyboards, guitar

=== Past members ===
- Yoav "Joe" Saar (2013-2023) - guitar, keyboards, sampler

== Discography ==
=== Studio albums ===
- Apollonia (2018)
- Never On Time (2024)

=== Compilation albums ===
- Instrumentals (2020)

=== EPs ===
- Entertainment (2013)
- Bengali Cinema (2014)
- Modern West (2015)
- She's So Untouchable (Single+Remixes) (2017)

=== Others ===
- BLDG5 'Ground Floor' Compilation (2013)
- Entertainment / Bengali Cinema LP (2014)
- Ninja Jamm - EP Bundle 5 (2014)

=== Music videos ===
- "Move On" (2014)
- "The More You Make It" (Anova Live Session) (2014)
- "She's So Untouchable" (2016)

== Awards ==
MTV Israel

Year	Nominee/Work	Award	Result
2014	"Move On" Video	Best Music Video	Won
2015	Garden City Movement	Satellite Award	Nominee
2016	Garden City Movement	Satellite Award	Won
