= Khruangbin =

American rock band

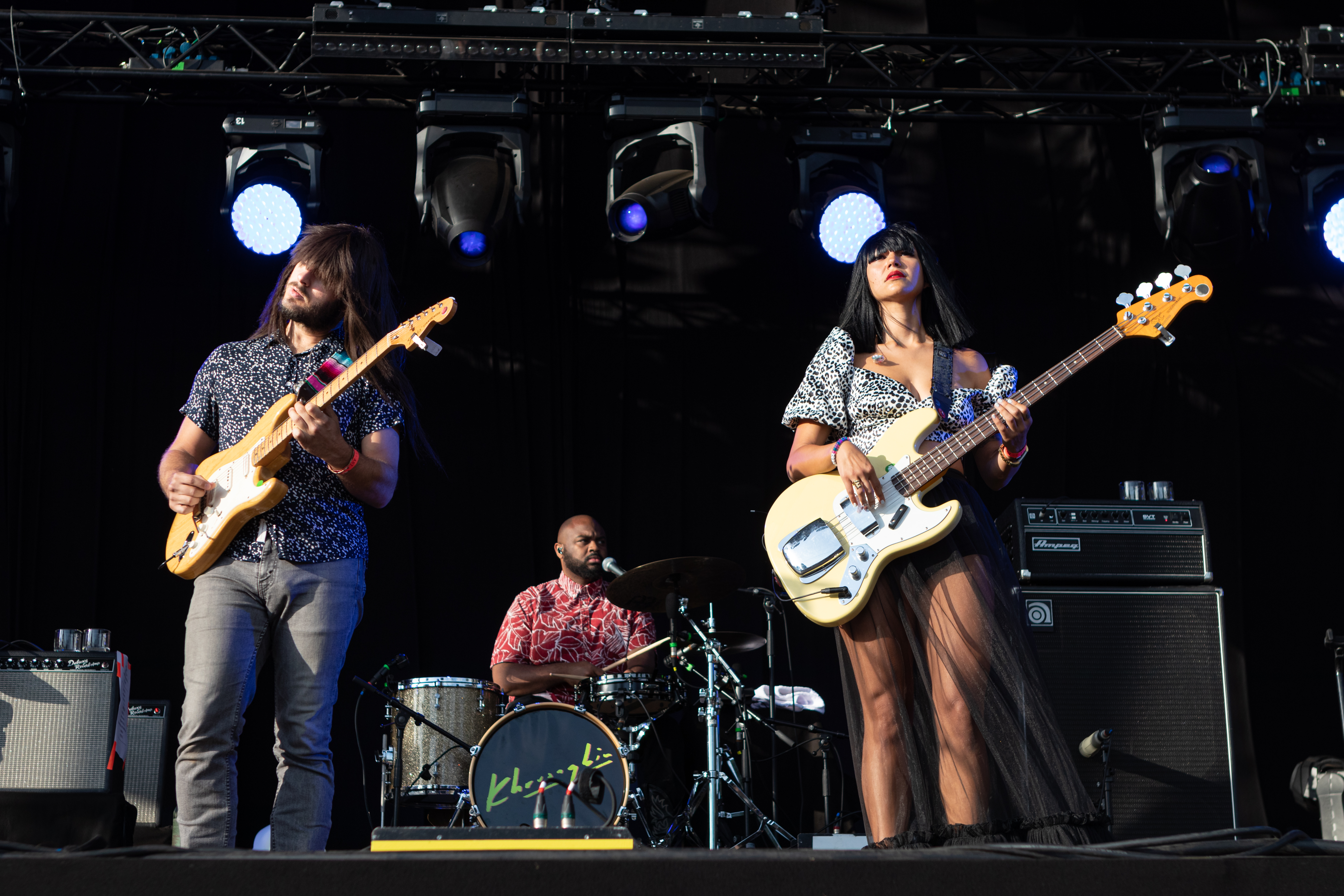
- Khruangbin performing at the 2019 Haldern Pop Festival

Background information
- Origin: Houston, Texas, US
- Genres: Psychedelic rock; funk; instrumental rock; dub; rock
- Years active: 2010–present
- Labels: Dead Oceans; Night Time Stories
- Members: Laura Lee; Mark Speer; Donald "DJ" Johnson
- Website: khruangbin.com

Khruangbin (/ˈkrʌŋbɪn/ KRUNG-bin; Thai: เครื่องบิน, lit. 'airplane', krʉ̂ʉang-bin, [kʰrɯa̯ŋ˥˩.bin]) is an American musical trio from Houston, Texas. The band consists of Laura Lee Ochoa (bass guitar and vocals), Mark Speer (guitar and vocals), and Donald "DJ" Johnson (drums, keyboards, and vocals). The trio is known for blending global music influences, such as Thai rock, Iranian pop, and dub, with American soul, rock, and psychedelia.

In 2024, the band was nominated for a Grammy Award for Best New Artist.

== Background ==
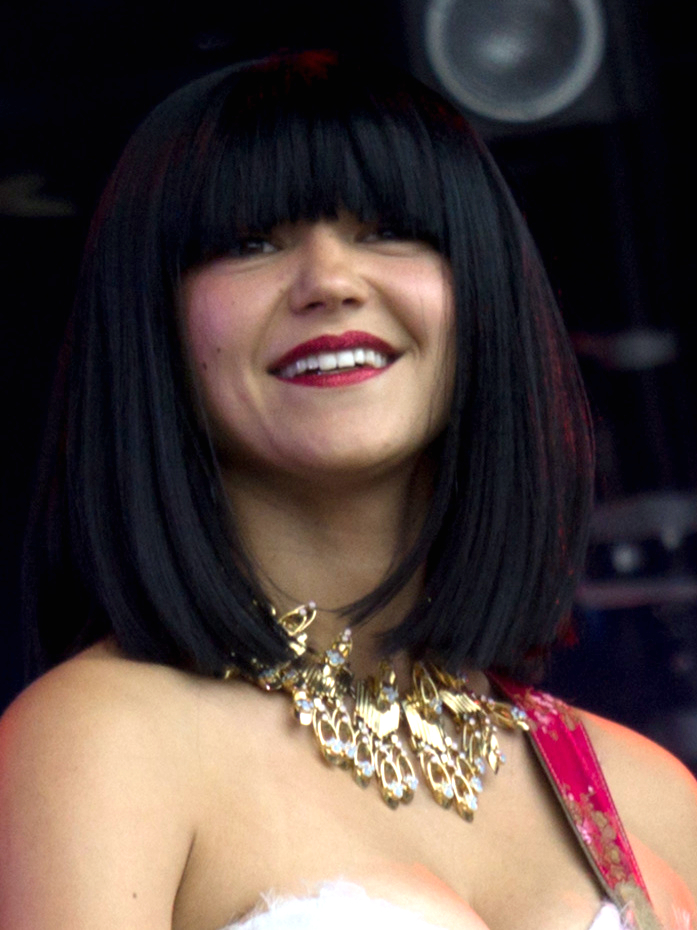
Laura Lee Ochoa

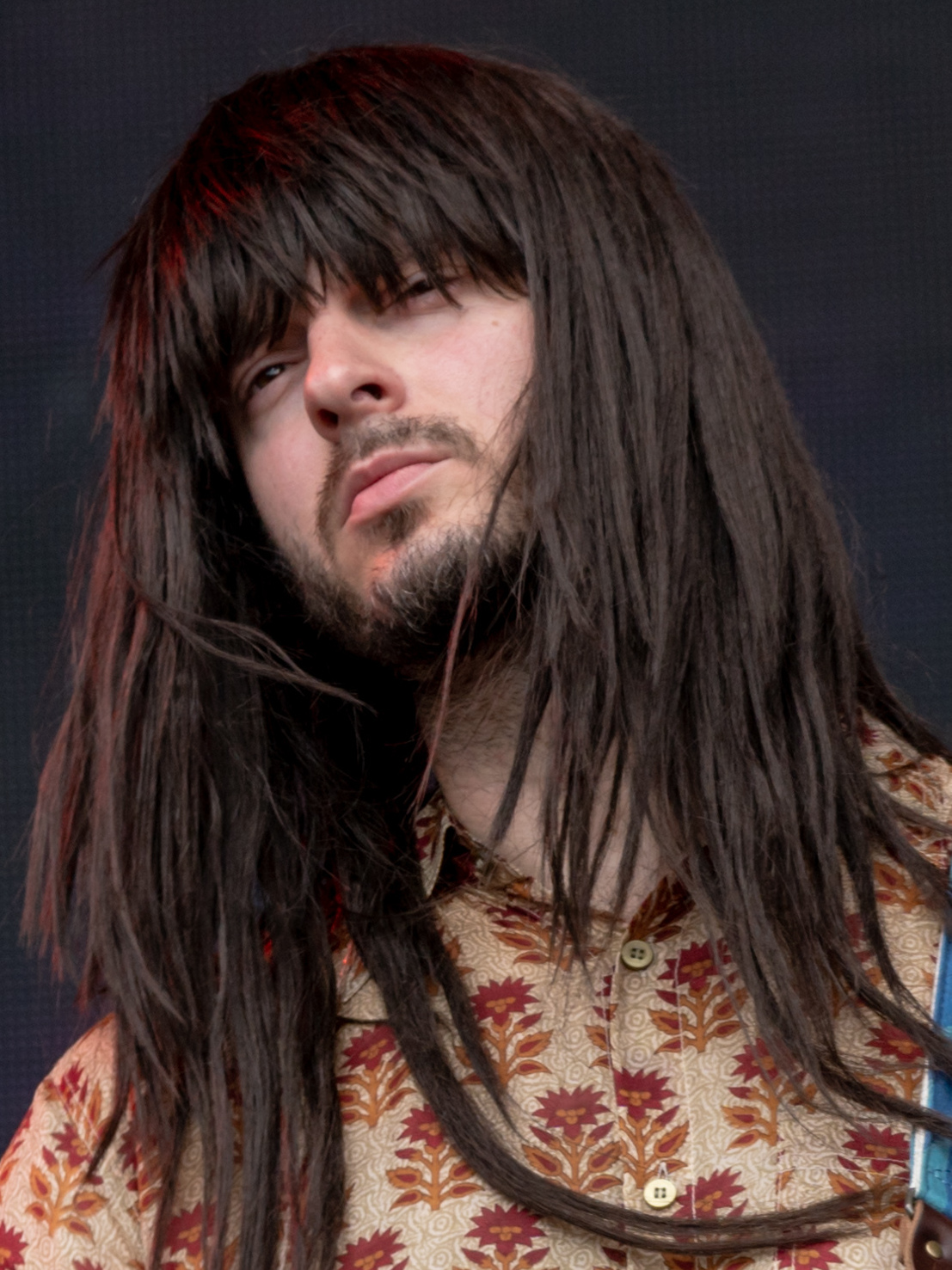
Mark Speer

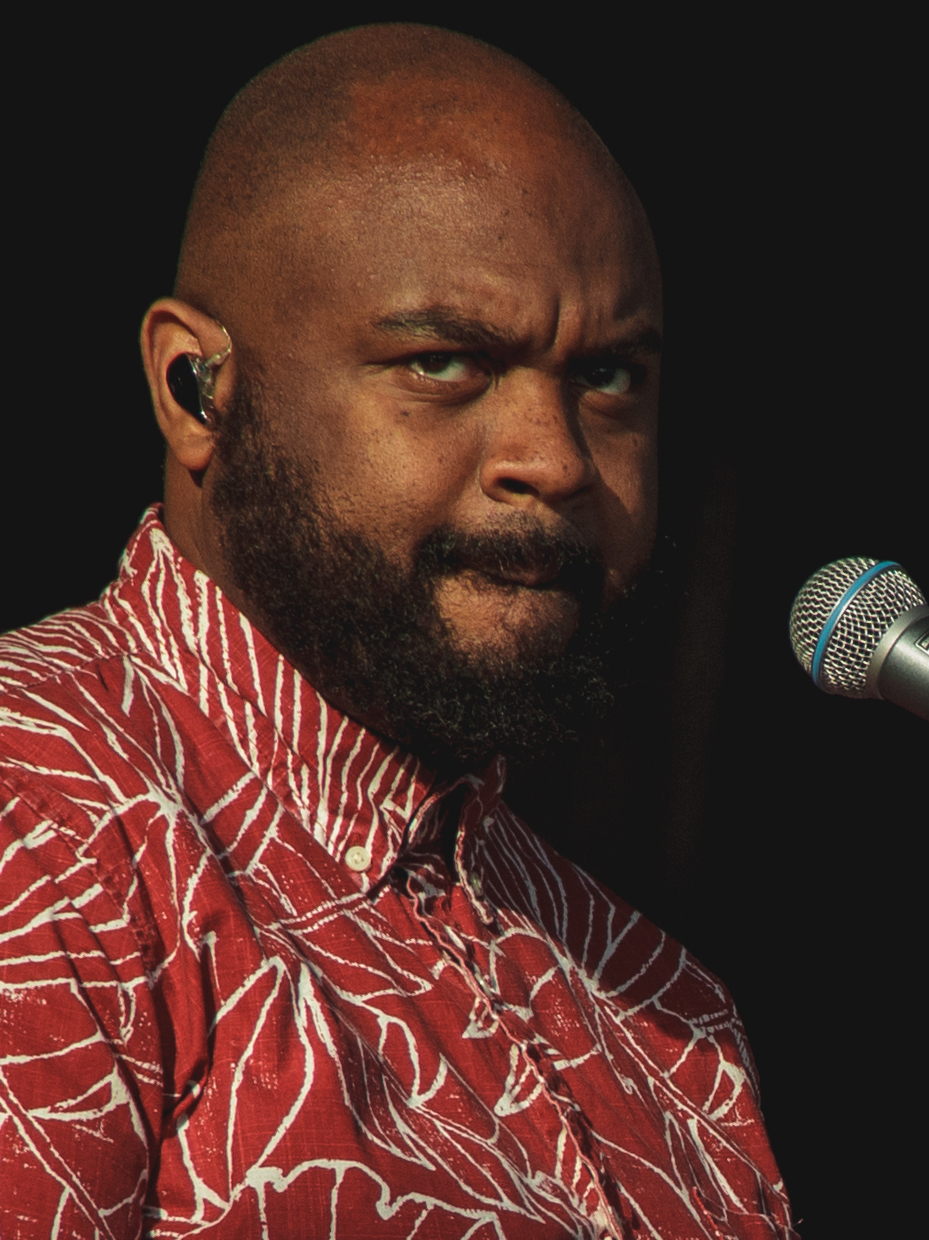
Donald "DJ" Johnson

Speer and Johnson met in 2004 when they played for Pastor Rudy Rasmus' St. John's Methodist Church gospel band in Houston, Texas. The church employed Speer as its guitarist and Johnson as its organist. The two musicians went to a bar after Tuesday-night rehearsal, where Speer revealed his extensive knowledge of music from around the globe. Johnson calls him "a music encyclopedia", and Speer told The New York Times Magazine that, as a child, he was obsessed with the Microsoft Encarta CD-ROM's catalog of music samples from around the world.

In 2007, Speer met Ochoa through friends, and the two initially connected over a shared love of Afghan music and Middle Eastern architecture. In 2009, Ochoa, who had trained on guitar and piano, started to learn the bass with guidance from Speer. After playing for six months, she auditioned and got the gig to be the bassist for Yppah on his upcoming tour. Speer already had the gig as guitarist for Yppah and had encouraged Ochoa to audition. In 2010, both Ochoa and Speer went on tour with Yppah who opened for Bonobo.

The tour motivated the two of them to make music together more seriously, leading them to form Khruangbin. Speer and Ochoa went to a barn where they developed the bass-heavy, psychedelic sound that became the basis of the band's aesthetic. Upon their return, they asked Johnson to join the band as drummer, to play simple break-beats under the guitar and bass. The barn, located in the 300-person town of Burton, Texas, would become the site of many future Khruangbin recording sessions. The band has a long-term working relationship with Houston-based engineer Steve Christensen.

When asked to play their first gig, Ochoa, who was learning to speak Thai at the time, decided they should use her favorite Thai word khruangbin (Thai: เครื่องบิน; RTGS: khrueang bin), which means 'airplane', as their name. Speer said that, had they had the foresight to predict the band's success, they might not have chosen a name that was so difficult to pronounce. Khruangbin has stated their name "symbolises the international set of influences that shaped our music".

Speer described the band's creative process as focused.

"When we first started the band, we wanted to have a formula," he says. "It's like, ‘This is what we do, and we're not gonna try and go outside the box too much. We're gonna explore the box we're in. I've always been a big fan of that. I used to be in bands where it was like, 'Man, we've gotta think outside the box!' And all I'm thinking is: 'You guys don’t even know.' Music should never be just for the sake of being experimental. Before you even start, you have to know what you're experimenting with first."

A notable part of the band's visual style is the black wigs that Ochoa and Speer wear on stage and during promotional interviews and photoshoots.

== Career ==
=== The Universe Smiles Upon You ===
After touring with Bonobo, Khruangbin's song "Calf Born in Winter" was included on his 2013 Late Night Tales compilation. The song became one of the most popular tracks on the record, helping create an initial audience for the band's first EP, History of Flight, and debut album, The Universe Smiles Upon You, in 2015. The 2015 debut draws from the history of Thai music in the 1960s, specifically from luk thung.

Shortly thereafter, Khruangbin were named The Guardian's "New Band of the Week," opening for acts like Father John Misty, Tycho, Chicano Batman, and Massive Attack. They also joined the festival circuit, playing a string of festivals like Lockn, Glastonbury, Bonnaroo, ACL, Outside Lands, Desert Daze, and South by Southwest.

In 2017, the band covered "Ma Beham Nemiresim" by Googoosh, a popular Iranian singer, for the Philia: Artists Rise Against Islamophobia compilation, and created a Tehran-specific playlist on Spotify, in addition to many other city-specific playlists, as part of their AirKhruang DJ series.

=== Con Todo el Mundo ===
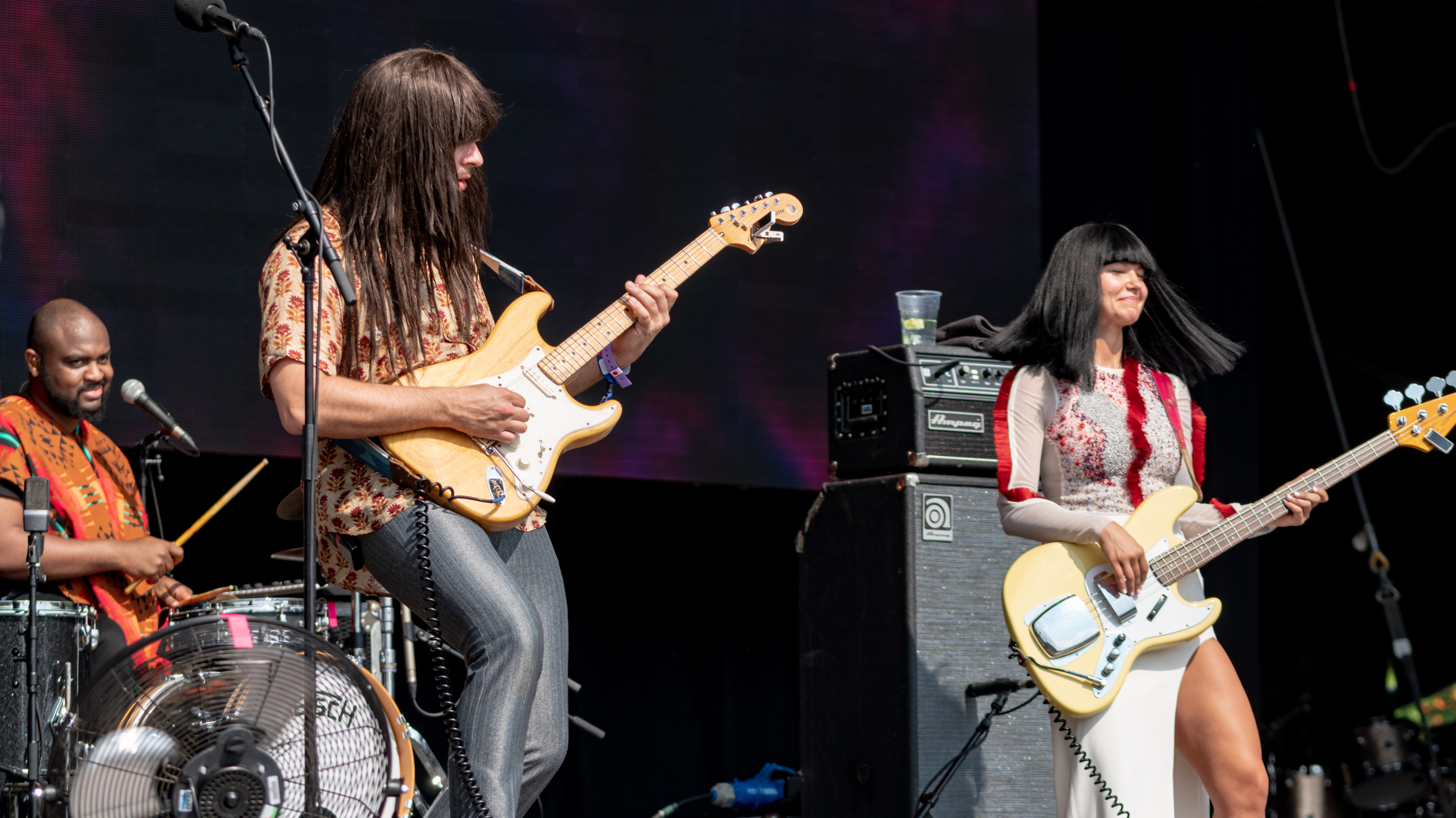
Khruangbin at All Points East 2018

In January 2018, Khruangbin released their second album, Con Todo el Mundo. The title of the album came from Ochoa's Mexican-American grandfather, who would often ask, "How do you love me?" ("¿Cómo me quieres?") and would only accept one response, "Con todo el mundo" or, in English, "with all the world." The band said the title of the record is also a reference to the diverse range of musical influences that inspired it, primarily from the Middle East. Later in the year they recorded live for Spotify an arrangement of the Indian song "Khuda Bhi Aasman Se", played by Mohammed Rafi in the movie Dharti. Con Todo el Mundo (2018), has influences from Spain, and, with regard to the Middle East, specifically Iran.

Speer, Ochoa, and Johnson also hosted "AirKhruang" radio shows on NTS Radio and Facebook Live.

They opened for Leon Bridges on his 2018 tour, as well as Trey Anastasio's Ghosts of the Forest tour in 2019. In 2019, Trey Anastasio also joined Khruangbin on stage at Lockn' Music Festival. In 2020, the group was featured on the cover of Relix.

=== Mordechai ===
Khruangbin's third studio album, Mordechai, was released in June 2020 on Dead Oceans. Three singles were released from the album, "Time (You & I)", "So We Won't Forget", and "Pelota". The band also relaunched their AirKhruang DJ series, and the following year appeared on Austin City Limits performing with Leon Bridges.

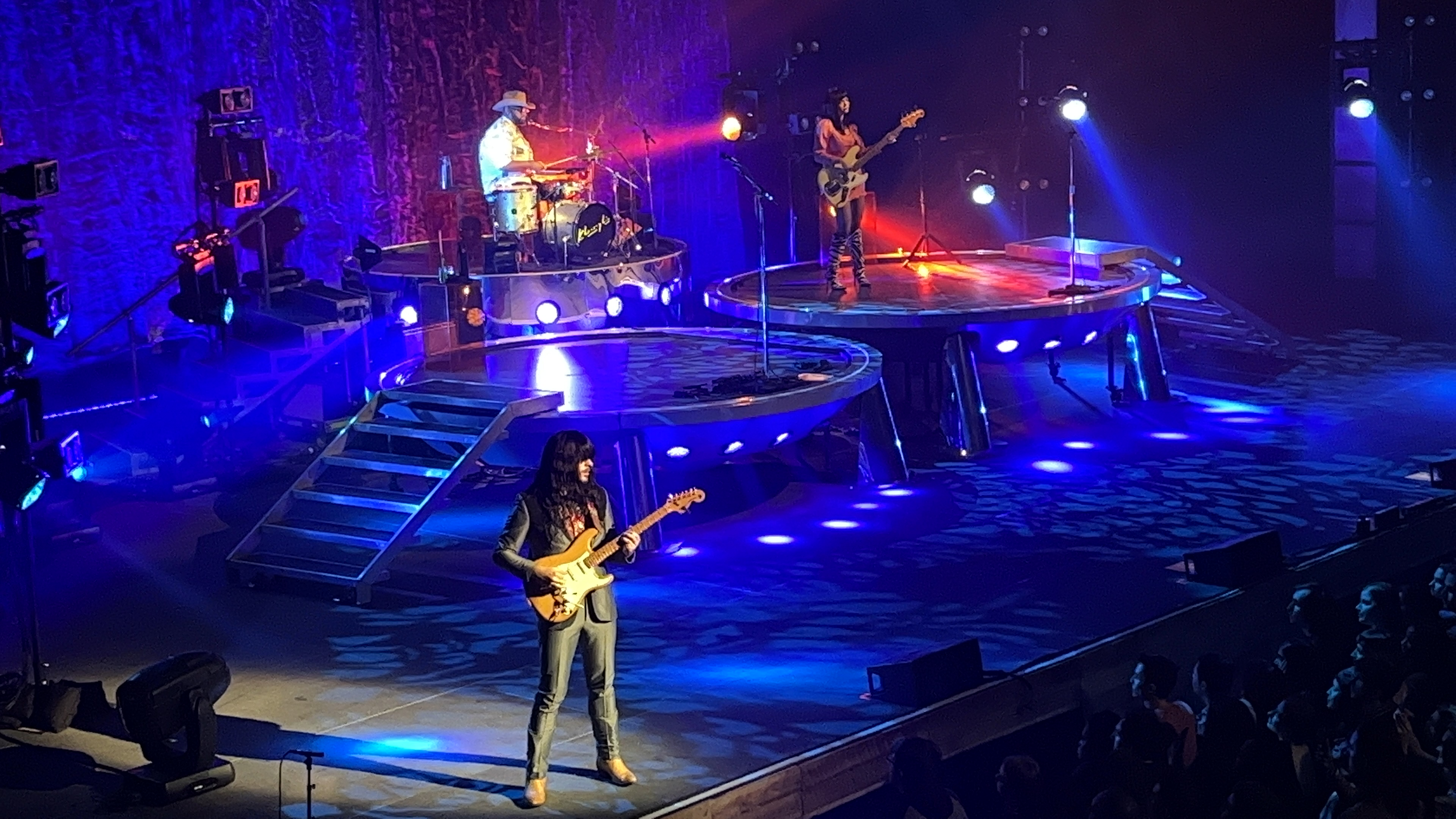
Khruangbin performing at The Anthem, 2022

The band's live appearances in 2022 included at St David's Hall for BBC Radio 6 Music Festival in Cardiff, the Park Stage at the Glastonbury Festival, and headlining the Cross The Tracks Festival in South London.

=== Ali ===
On September 23, 2022, the band released the album Ali, a collaboration with Vieux Farka Touré, featuring eight tracks of covers of songs by Vieux's father, Ali Farka Touré.

In 2023, the band's 2014 single, "A Calf Born in Winter", appeared as part of the soundtrack of the comedy-drama film, The Holdovers.

=== A La Sala ===
In January 2024, the band announced their fourth solo album, A La Sala, which was released on April 5, 2024, and shared a video for a new song, "A Love International".

The band played both weekends of the 2024 ACL Music Festival in October 2024 in Austin, Texas.

In November 2024, the band was nominated for the Grammy Award for Best New Artist.

=== The Universe Smiles Upon You ii ===
On November 7, 2025, to mark the 10th anniversary of The Universe Smiles Upon You, the band released The Universe Smiles Upon You ii, a re-recorded and reworked version of their 2015 debut album.

== Genre and style ==
Khruangbin's style does not fit neatly into an existing genre. The New York Times called it "extremely slippery, genrewise (Is it psychedelic lounge dub? Desert surf rock? The sound you hear inside a lava lamp?)." Mostly instrumental, the band's sound has been described as soul, surf rock, psychedelic, rock, dub and funk, with one website even describing them as "electronic". The most commonly used term to describe Khruangbin's music is Thai funk, though the band members themselves challenge the convention of genres, publicly refusing to be pigeonholed into one particular label.

As music journalist Rob Shepherd noted for PostGenre, "the [name Khruangbin], which translates to 'flying engine' or airplane in Thai, is perfect for their music as it often crosses borders and cultures." The New York Times wrote that Khruangbin's sound was so distinct and popular that "there now exists an entire subgenre of music broadly known as 'Khruangbin vibes.'"

== Band members ==
- Laura Lee Ochoa – bass guitar, vocals
- Mark Speer – guitars, percussion, vocals
- Donald "DJ" Johnson – drums, percussion, keyboards, piano, organ, vocals

== Discography ==
=== Studio albums ===
List of studio albums, with selected details and peak chart positions
Title	Details	Peak chart positions									
Title	Details	US	AUS	BEL	FRA	GER	IRL	NLD	NZ	SWI	UK
The Universe Smiles Upon You	Released: November 6, 2015; Label: Night Time Stories; Formats: CD, digital download, LP, streaming	—	—	120	—	—	—	—	—	83	—
Con Todo el Mundo	Released: January 26, 2018; Label: Dead Oceans; Night Time Stories; Formats: CD, digital download, LP, streaming	—	—	46	—	—	—	91	—	—	82
Mordechai	Released: June 26, 2020; Label: Dead Oceans; Night Time Stories; Formats: CD, digital download, LP, streaming	31	4	4	165	8	52	5	10	11	7
Ali (with Vieux Farka Touré)	Released: September 23, 2022; Label: Dead Oceans; Formats: CD, digital download, LP, streaming	—	61	10	—	24	—	16	36	—	47
A La Sala	Released: April 5, 2024; Label: Dead Oceans; Formats: CD, digital download, LP, streaming	38	14	3	87	2	80	6	14	7	18
The Universe Smiles Upon You II	Released: November 7, 2025; Label: Dead Oceans; Formats: CD, digital download, LP, streaming	—	—	130	—	—	—	—	—	—	— (Note: The Universe Smiles Upon You II did not enter the UK Albums Chart, but peaked at number 54 on the UK Album Sales Chart Top 100.)
"—" denotes album that did not chart or was not released in that territory.

=== EPs ===
- เครื่องบิน (2011)
- The Infamous Bill (2014)
- History of Flight (2015)
- Spotify Singles (2018)
- Texas Sun (with Leon Bridges, 2020)
- Texas Moon (with Leon Bridges, 2022) – No. 23 Billboard 200

=== Compilation albums ===
- 全てが君に微笑む (2019, Night Time Stories; Beat Records)

=== Remix albums ===
- Hasta El Cielo (2019, Dead Oceans; Night Time Stories) (dub music version of Con Todo el Mundo)
- Late Night Tales: Khruangbin (2020, Night Time Stories)
- Mordechai Remixes (2021, Dead Oceans)

=== Live recordings ===
- Live @ Helios (2012, Hightower Records)
- Pitchfork Live: Khruangbin @ Villain (2018) (released by Pitchfork on YouTube)
- Live at Lincoln Hall (2018)
- Live at Arcosanti, Arizona (2019 FORM Arcosanti Festival)
- Live at Stubb's (2023 Dead Oceans/Night Time Stories Ltd) (with Kelly Doyle, Ruben Moreno, The Suffers and Robert Ellis)
- Live at Radio City Music Hall (2023) (with Nubya Garcia)
- Live at RBC Echo Beach (2023) (with Men I Trust)
- Live at the Fillmore Miami (2023) (with Toro y Moi)
- Live at Sydney Opera House (2023)

=== Singles ===
List of singles, with selected peak chart positions and certifications
Title	Year	Peak chart positions									Certifications	Album/EP
Title	Year	US AAA	US Rock	BEL Tip	ICE	NL Air.	NZ Hot	SCO	UK Sales	UK Indie	Certifications	Album/EP
"A Calf Born in Winter"	2014	—	—	—	—	—	—	—	— (Note: "A Calf Born in Winter" did not enter the UK Singles Chart, but peaked at number 95 on the UK Physical Singles Chart Top 100.)	—		Non-album single
"White Gloves"	2015	—	—	—	—	—	—	—	—	—		The Universe Smiles Upon You
"People Everywhere (Still Alive)"	2016	—	—	—	—	—	—	—	— (Note: "People Everywhere (Still Alive)" did not enter the UK Singles Chart, but peaked at number 41 on the UK Physical Singles Chart Top 100.)	—		The Universe Smiles Upon You
"Maria También"	2017	—	—	—	—	—	—	—	—	—		Con Todo el Mundo
"Friday Morning"	2018	—	—	—	—	—	—	—	—	—		Con Todo el Mundo
"Christmas Time Is Here"	2018	—	—	—	—	—	—	—	— (Note: "Christmas Time Is Here" did not enter the UK Singles Chart, but peaked at number four on the UK Physical Singles Chart Top 100.)	—		Non-album single
"Texas Sun" (with Leon Bridges)	2019	17	20	3	—	34	37	17	15	42	BPI: Silver; RIAA: Gold	Texas Sun
"Time (You and I)"	2020	40	45	16	12	—	—	—	—	—		Mordechai
"So We Won't Forget"	2020	—	—	—	—	—	—	—	— (Note: "So We Won't Forget" did not enter the UK Singles Chart, but peaked at number 60 on the UK Physical Singles Chart Top 100.)	—		Mordechai
"Pelota"	2020	—	—	37	—	—	—	—	— (Note: "Pelota" did not enter the UK Singles Chart, but peaked at number 19 on the UK Physical Singles Chart Top 100.)	—		Mordechai
"Summer Madness"	2020	—	—	—	—	—	—	—	—	—		Late Night Tales: Khruangbin
"Dearest Alfred (MyJoy)"	2021	—	—	—	—	—	—	—	— (Note: "Dearest Alfred (MyJoy)" did not enter the UK Singles Chart, but peaked at number 7 on the UK Physical Singles Chart Top 100.)	—		Mordechai Remixes
"The Answer Is"	2021	—	—	—	—	—	—	—	— (Note: "The Answer Is" did not enter the UK Singles Chart, but peaked at number 11 on the UK Physical Singles Chart Top 100.)	—		Non-album single
"One to Remember"	2021	—	—	—	—	—	—	—	— (Note: "One to Remember" did not enter the UK Singles Chart, but peaked at number 9 on the UK Physical Singles Chart Top 100.)	—		Mordechai
"Barn Breaks Vol. III"	2021	—	—	—	—	—	—	—	— (Note: "Barn Breaks Vol. III" did not enter the UK Singles Chart, but peaked at number 5 on the UK Physical Singles Chart Top 100.)	—		Non-album single
"B-Side" (with Leon Bridges)	2021	7	49	—	—	—	34	—	—	—		Texas Moon
"A Love International"	2024	31	—	—	—	—	—	—	—	—		A La Sala
"May Ninth"	2024	—	—	—	—	—	39	—	—	—		A La Sala
"Pon Pón"	2024	—	—	—	—	—	40	—	—	—		A La Sala
"White Gloves ii" / "M. Blanc"	2026	—	—	—	—	—	—	—	63	—		Non-album single
"—" denotes single that did not chart or was not released in that territory.

=== Other charted songs ===
List of other charted songs, with selected peak chart positions
Title	Year	Peak chart positions	Album/EP
Title	Year	NZ Hot	Album/EP
"Hold Me Up (Thank You)"	2024	30	A La Sala

== Awards and nominations ==
Award Ceremony	Year	Nominee/Work	Category	Result
Berlin Music Video Awards	2021	"So We Won't Forget"	Best Narrative	Won
Berlin Music Video Awards	2024	"A Love International"	Best Narrative	Nominated

== Tours ==
Headlining

- North American Fall Tour (2018)
- North American Tour (2021–2022)
- Space Walk Tour (2022)
- A LA SALA Tour (2024–2025)

Opening

- Good Thing Tour (2018) (with Leon Bridges)
- Ghosts of the Forest Tour (2019) (with Trey Anastasio)
