= Aquamarine (album) =

Studio album by Ash Walker
- Released: 19 July 2019
- Genre: Dub; reggae; jazz; trip hop; R&B; neo soul; acid jazz; downtempo
- Length: 38:30
- Label: Night Time Stories
- Producer: Ash Walker

Ash Walker chronology
Echo Chamber (2017)	Aquamarine (2019)	Astronaut (2023)

Aquamarine is the third studio album by the London-based musician and DJ, Ash Walker, released by Night Time Stories on 19 July 2019. The album expands on Walker's established sound which includes jazz, dub, reggae, trip hop, R&B, neo soul, acid jazz, and downtempo electronica.

== Background ==
Aquamarine is the first Ash Walker album released by the English independent record label, Night Time Stories. It was the first album Walker recorded at home; he recorded his previous albums in recording studios. The album featured Marc Cyril on bass, Yazz Ahmed on trumpet and flugelhorn, Lord Laville on vocals, and Jonathan Shorten on Rhodes piano and Moog synthesizer. Its sound has been called as "underwater jazz". The album included vinyl pops and hisses, as a part of what Walker calls an "anti-sound engineer" approach. His engineering approach was influenced by King Tubby.

I’m not a fan of clean, precise, and perfect. I’m quite an advocate of mistakes. I’m a big fan of fuzzes, crackles, and all the stuff that a normal engineer would try to clean up and get rid of.

— Ash Walker

Walker described the concept of the album:

My previous albums have felt to me more like ventures on land. This one feels more like a deep sea voyage into the subconscious. Living to dream with visions of grandeur. Manifesting a beautiful path to walk on. It was inspired by everything around me, from friends and family to art and design, engineering and architecture, movement and how we use our five senses. I love to try and push my own boundaries of what I perceive to be right and wrong, seeing mistakes as innovations, and obstacles as inspiration.

— Ash Walker

== Reception ==
Aquamarine received favorable reviews. Ljubinko Zivkovic of Soundblab wrote, "I've no idea how many thousands of records Walker has in his collection, but Aquamarine sounds like he has thoroughly listened, well digested quite a few of them", and "Walker throws in elements literally from everywhere, without at any time sounding incompatible or incongruous. It is like a smooth ride in that submarine on the cover. All you need is Wes Anderson and his captain Steve Zissou and his crew to take you for that ride." John-Paul Shiver of In Search of Media wrote, "Walker, with his audio spaceship, created in the hiss and pops of many vinyl albums, has put together a signature grouping of analog and digital oscillations that resembles NOTHING from this era." SonicBoom wrote, "Ash Walker’s sound is tailor made for the record-nerd. The grooves and influence-nods are all top notch. Aquamarine mysteriously manages to conjure some of the best elements of trip-hop and acid-jazz while being a new thing unto itself." Beat Caffeine wrote, "Ash Walker has successfully put together a great new forward-thinking and mesmerizing album, one that feels like your listening to soulful cosmic grooves at the bottom of the ocean … and you are absolutely happy to be there."

== Track listing ==
1. "Under The Sun"
2. "Time"
3. "Come With Us"
4. "Brave New World"
5. "Finishing Touch"
6. "Aquamarine"
7. "Sanity"
8. "I Need Money"
9. "Fat King Smoke"
10. "Ain't Got You"
11. "The Dagon's Cashmere Jumper"
