= The Universe Smiles upon You =

Studio album by Khruangbin
- Released: November 6, 2015
- Length: 39:40
- Label: Night Time Stories
- Producers: Mark Speer; Steve Christensen

Khruangbin chronology
The Universe Smiles upon You (2015)	Con Todo el Mundo (2018)

Singles from The Universe Smiles Upon You
- 1. "White Gloves" Released: September 4, 2015

The Universe Smiles upon You is the debut studio album by American musical trio Khruangbin. It was released November 6, 2015 under Night Time Stories label.

== Critical reception ==
Professional ratings
Review scores
Source	Rating
Paste	8.4/10

Max Savage Levenson of Paste reviewed The Universe Smiles upon You is "a subtle dance, a constellation of small movements and highly nuanced arrangements that unfolds seamlessly, like ripples on the water." Peter Helman of Stereogum said "The album is something both groove-heavy and dreamy, and it absolutely evokes the deep-in-the-wilderness".

== Track listing ==
All tracks are written by Laura Lee and Mark Speer, except "The Man Who Took My Sunglasses", written by Andy Wilkins.

No.	Title	Length
1.	"Mr. White"	4:58
2.	"Two Fish and an Elephant"	3:33
3.	"Dern Kala"	3:39
4.	"Little Joe & Mary"	5:08
5.	"White Gloves"	3:38
6.	"People Everywhere (Still Alive)"	2:39
7.	"The Man Who Took My Sunglasses"	2:13
8.	"August Twelve"	6:13
9.	"Balls and Pins"	3:28
10.	"Zionsville"	4:11

== Personnel ==
Khruangbin

- Laura Lee – bass, vocals
- Mark Speer – guitar, percussion, vocals
- Donald "DJ" Johnson – drums

Additional musician

- Wilhelm Van Horn – pedal steel guitar

== Charts ==
Chart performance for The Universe Smiles upon You
Chart (2019–2026)	Peak position
Belgian Albums (Ultratop Flanders)	120
Swiss Albums (Schweizer Hitparade)	83
