= Middle Eastern architecture =

Middle Eastern architecture may refer to several broad styles of architecture historically or currently associated with the Middle East region, including:

- Islamic architecture
- Iranian architecture
- Ottoman architecture
