= Ash Walker =

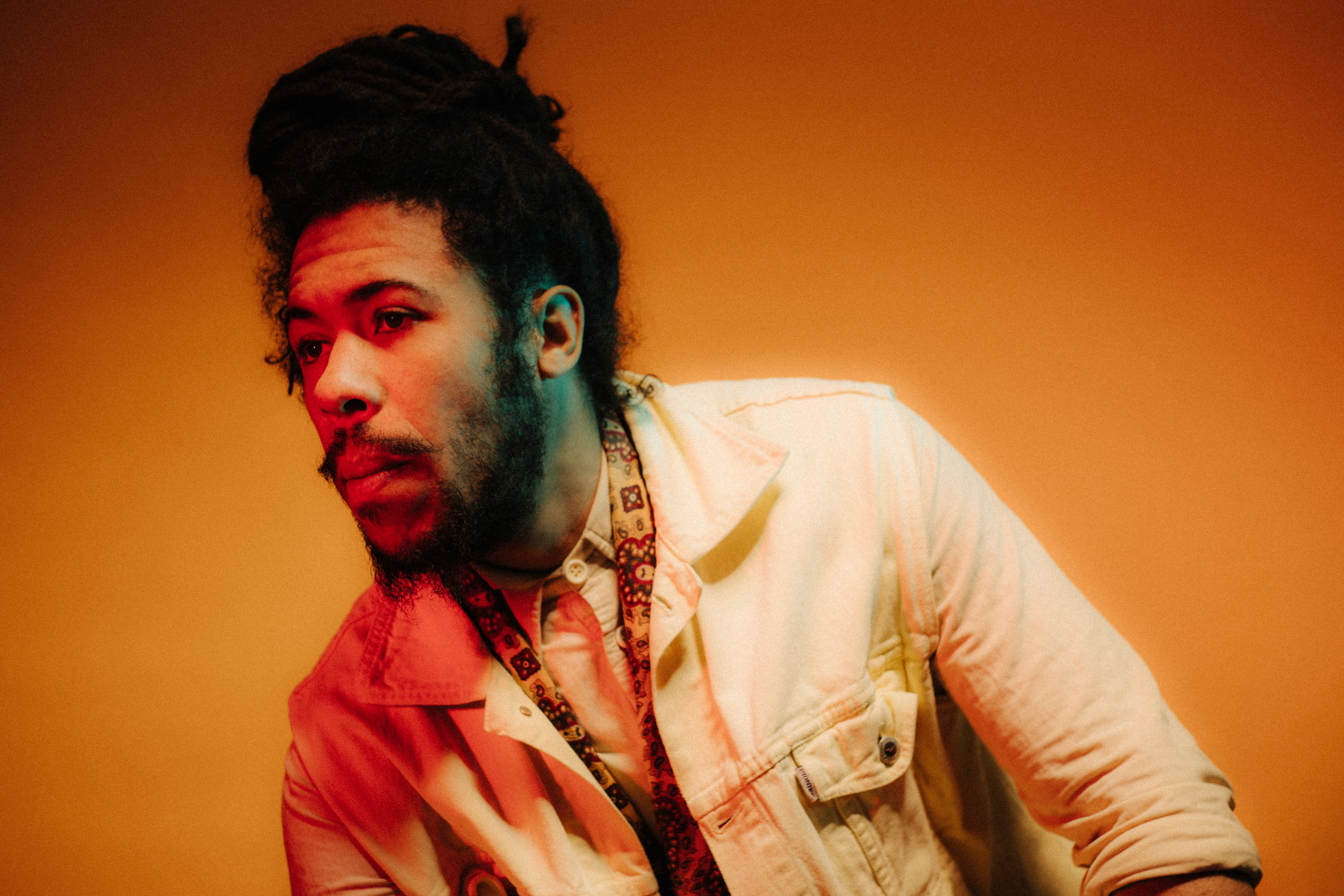

Background information
- Origin: London, England
- Genres: Jazz; blues; soul; funk; reggae; dub; trip hop; acid jazz
- Occupations: Musician, DJ, audio engineer
- Instruments: Bass guitar; keyboards; melodica; turntablism
- Years active: 2015–present
- Labels: Night Time Stories; Deep Heads
- Formerly of: The Ash Walker Experience
- Website: ashwalker.co.uk

Ash Walker is a London-based musician, multi-instrumentalist and DJ, whose music spans a diverse range of genres, such as jazz, blues, soul, funk, reggae, dub, trip hop, acid jazz, and electronica, among others. He has released four studio albums: Augmented 7th (2015) and Echo Chamber (2017) on Deep Heads, and Aquamarine (2019) and Astronaut (2023) on Night Time Stories.

== Career ==
Ash Walker began his career in 2015 with the release of his debut album, Augmented 7th. The album featured a diverse range of genres, such as dub, reggae, jazz, trip-hop, and electronica. It featured Nikolaj Torp Larsen of The Specials on melodica.

Aquamarine was the first album Walker recorded at home; he recorded his previous albums in recording studios. The album featured Marc Cyril on bass, Yazz Ahmed on trumpet and flugelhorn, Lord Laville on vocals, and Jonathan Shorten on Rhodes piano and Moog synthesizer. The album included vinyl pops and hisses, as a part of what Walker calls an "anti-sound engineer" approach. His engineering approach was influenced by King Tubby.

I’m not a fan of clean, precise, and perfect. I’m quite an advocate of mistakes. I’m a big fan of fuzzes, crackles, and all the stuff that a normal engineer would try to clean up and get rid of.

— Ash Walker

He formed his live trio in 2017 with himself on keyboards and melodica, Marc Cyril on bass and Tim Shackman on drums. Later, he added Lord Laville on vocals and Yazz Ahmed on trumpet, and named the band The Ash Walker Experience.

As a DJ, Walker has opened for The Specials, Lee "Scratch" Perry, David Rodigan, El-B, and Zed Bias, among others.

His music has gained attention and has been played by renowned radio DJs such as Gilles Peterson, Don Letts, Gideon Coe, Tom Robinson, and Tom Ravenscroft.

== Songwriting and influences ==
Being a bassist himself, Ash Walker writes his songs on bass guitar first.

His influences include Duke Ellington, Quincy Jones, King Tubby, Bo Diddley, 4hero, J Dilla, Pete Rock, Curtis Mayfield, Philip Glass, and Steve Reich, among others.

== Discography ==
=== Studio albums ===
- Augmented 7th (2015)
- Echo Chamber (2017)
- Aquamarine (2019)
- Astronaut (2023)
