= Andrew Ashong =

British-Ghanaian soul singer-songwriter, DJ and record producer

- Born: London, England
- Genres: Soul; R&B
- Occupations: Singer-songwriter, musician, dj, producer
- Instruments: Vocals, guitar
- Years active: 2012–present
- Labels: Which Way Records, Sound Signature

Andrew Ashong is a British-Ghanaian soul singer-songwriter, DJ and record producer from Forest Hill in South London. He spent his teenage years searching for records and by 16 he was DJing and working on his own productions. Andrew Ashong has released two EPs: Flowers with Theo Parrish (2012) and the Andrew Ashong EP (2014), which moved away from the dance floor sound of Flowers and interjected more soul and jazz inspired rhythms and textures A release less targeted to the dance floor, it instead chooses to retrospectively immerse in the ethics of true music. He also featured on "Day like This/Feel Loved" by Tony Allen and Theo Parish (2013). Paul Lester of The Guardian has compared him to Shuggie Otis, Roy Ayers, Bill Withers and Lewis Taylor in his "New Band of the Day" feature.

== Releases ==
=== EPs ===
Title	EP details
Flowers	Released: 14 September 2012; Label: Sound Signature; Formats: Vinyl EP, Digital Download
Andrew Ashong	Released: 27 January 2014; Label: Which Way Records; Formats: Vinyl EP, Digital Download

== Awards and nominations ==
Year	Organisation	Award	Result
2012	Gilles Peterson Worldwide Awards	Track of the Year	First
