= Ali (Vieux Farka Touré and Khruangbin album) =

Studio album by Vieux Farka Touré and Khruangbin
- Released: September 23, 2022
- Recorded: June 2019
- Studio: Khruangbin's home studio (Burton, Texas)
- Genre: Psychedelic rock, blues
- Length: 37:02
- Label: Dead Oceans
- Producer: Khruangbin; Steve Christensen

Vieux Farka Touré chronology
Les Racines (2022)	Ali (2022)

Khruangbin chronology
Late Night Tales: Khruangbin (2020)	Ali (2022)	Live at Sydney Opera House (2023)

Singles from Ali
- 1. "Savanne" Released: 27 July 2022; 2. "Tongo Barra" Released: 31 August 2022

Ali is a collaborative studio album by Malian singer and guitarist Vieux Farka Touré and Texan trio Khruangbin. It consists of covers of songs by Vieux's father, Ali Farka Touré. It was released on September 23, 2022, on Dead Oceans.

== Background ==
Vieux Farka Touré was looking for musicians to work with on an album that would honor his father, Malian guitarist Ali Farka Touré, who died in 2006. Vieux's manager suggested he collaborate with Houston, Texas-based musical trio Khruangbin, and Vieux met them at a pub in London. He decided to collaborate with them after attending their concert at the Roundhouse in London in 2018, impressed by their live show. They recorded the album over the course of a week in June 2019 at Khruangbin's barn in Burton, Texas. The songs on the album were selected by Ali's 11 children. After being put on hold due to the COVID-19 pandemic, the album was finalized in 2021.

== Critical reception ==
Professional ratings
Aggregate scores
Source	Rating
Metacritic	80/100
Review scores
Source	Rating
AllMusic	4/5 stars
Clash	7/10
Crack	7/10
Far Out	4/5 stars
Financial Times	4/5 stars
The Guardian	5/5 stars
The Line of Best Fit	8/10

Alexis Petridis of The Guardian awarded the album five stars out of five, calling the collaboration "an inspired choice" and adding, "It's an album you can easily lose yourself in, which is presumably the point." Janne Oinonen of The Line of Best Fit wrote, "Both parties benefit from the collaboration on Ali: Touré gets to paint the songs he loves with a wider palette without diluting the power of the source material, and Khruangbin adds some welcome grit to their smooth and hazy signature sound."

== Track listing ==
All tracks are written by Ali Farka Touré.

No.	Title	Length
1.	"Savanne"	5:16
2.	"Lobbo"	4:34
3.	"Diarabi"	5:01
4.	"Tongo Barra"	5:33
5.	"Tamalla"	5:55
6.	"Mahine Me"	2:40
7.	"Ali Hala Abada"	5:02
8.	"Alakarra"	2:59
Total length:		37:02

== Personnel ==
- Vieux Farka Touré — guitar; vocals (tracks 1–7)
- Mark Speer — synthesizer (tracks 1, 7), congas (tracks 1, 2, 4, 5, 7), guitar (tracks 2–6, 8), organ (tracks 2–4), vocals (tracks 2–8), percussion (tracks 2–5, 7, 8)
- Laura Lee Ochoa — bass; vocals (tracks 2–8), percussion (tracks 2–5, 7, 8), whisper (track 8)
- Donald "DJ" Johnson Jr. — drums; vocals (tracks 2–8), percussion (tracks 2–5, 7, 8), washboard (track 6)

Additional Personnel

- Ruben Moreno — accordion (track 6)

== Charts ==
Weekly chart performance for Ali
Chart (2022)	Peak position
Australian Albums (ARIA)	61
Belgian Albums (Ultratop Flanders)	10
Belgian Albums (Ultratop Wallonia)	158
Dutch Albums (Album Top 100)	16
German Albums (Offizielle Top 100)	24
New Zealand Albums (RMNZ)	36
Swiss Albums (Schweizer Hitparade)	51
UK Albums (OCC)	47
