= Korg Trident =

Polyphonic multi-orchestral synthesizer

Trident
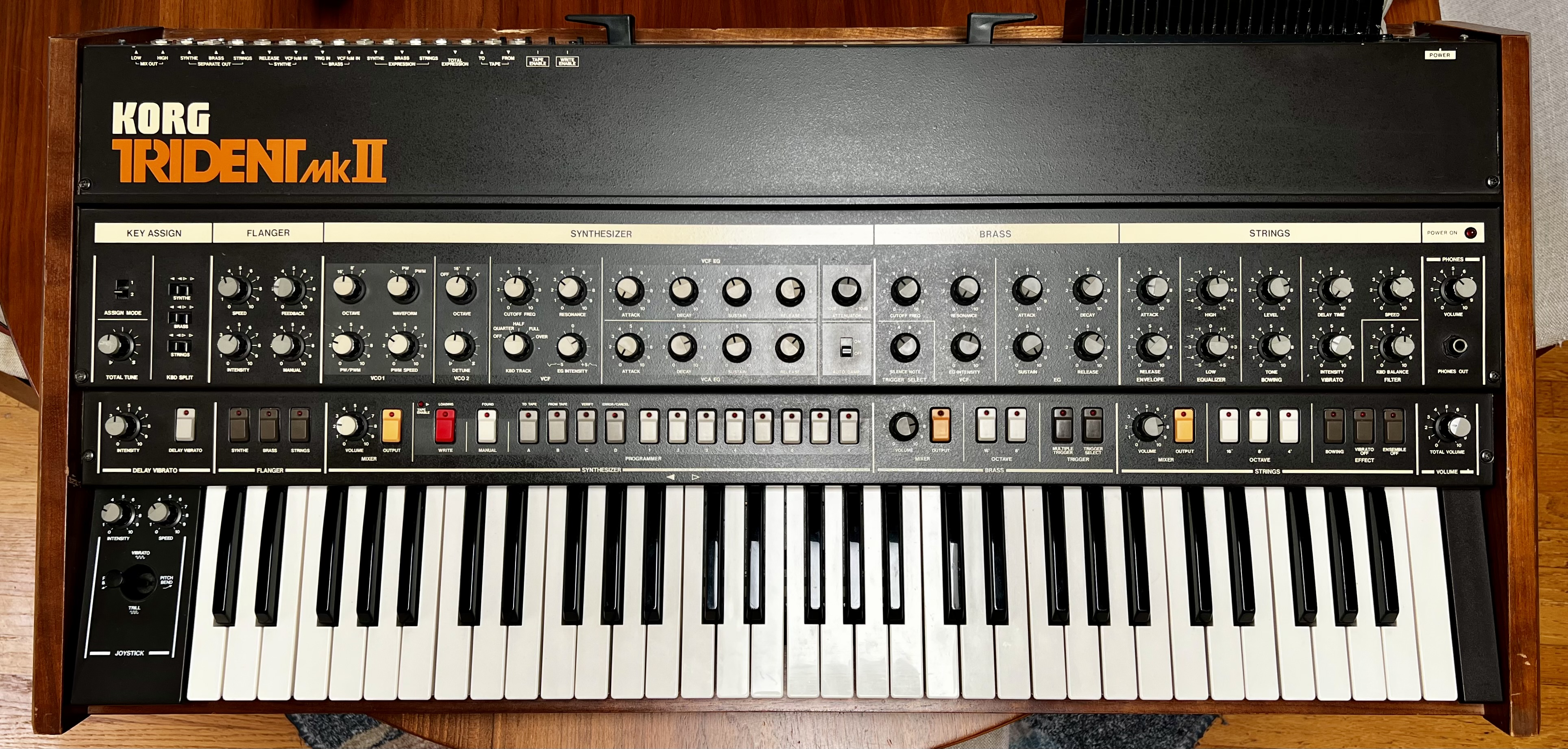
- Korg Trident MK II
- Manufacturer: Korg
- Dates: 1980-1982

Technical specifications
- Polyphony: Full / 8-note
- Oscillator: Sub-octave divider network / dual analog VCO
- Synthesis type: Analog subtractive
- Attenuator: ADSR envelope (2); AR envelope (1)
- Aftertouch expression: no
- Velocity expression: no
- Storage memory: 16 presets (MkI); 32 presets (MkII)
- Effects: Ensemble; Flanger

Input/output
- Keyboard: 61 keys
- Left-hand control: pitch-bend / vibrato / trill - joystick controlled

The Korg Trident is a polyphonic multi-section synthesizer released by Korg in 1980, combining three distinct synthesizers within a single instrument: a polyphonic section with two VCOs, alongside dedicated String and Brass sections. The polyphonic synthesizer section allows for eight-note polyphony with dual oscillators. The String section offers an ensemble effect and simple attack/release envelope controls, whereas the Brass section features an independent filter and a dedicated ADSR envelope. These sections can be assigned to two different regions of the keyboard independently, and the Trident also offers a flanger effect along with a joystick for pitch bending and modulation.

In 1982, the enhanced MkII version was introduced, offering additional memory, improved stability, and an extra ADSR envelope.

== Sounds and features ==
The Trident features three separate sections for polysynth, brass, and strings, each with its own output level control. It includes an octave split function, allowing these sections to be assigned to upper, lower, or both ranges of the keyboard. It also features a joystick controller and various effects that can be applied to each section individually or to all sections collectively.

The synth section features dual VCOs with tuning options of 16', 8', and 4'. VCO1 offers sawtooth and square waveforms, along with pulse-width (PW) and pulse-width modulation (PWM) controls. VCO2 includes a detune function (± one semitone), and the voltage-controlled filter (VCF) offers low pass filtering with cutoff, resonance, and envelope intensity controls, which vary positively or negatively from the centre '0' position. Keyboard tracking for the filter has three settings, off, half, or full. The voltage-controlled amplifier (VCA) can follow ADSR envelope controls or simple on/off keying. Synth sounds can be stored in one of sixteen 'program' slots, chosen with Bank A, B, and program buttons 1-8. It also offers three piano tone presets: Piano 1, Piano 2, and Clavinet.

The brass section offers pitch settings of 16' and 8', complemented by a full ADSR envelope generator. It also features its own dedicated filter equipped with resonance, cutoff, and envelope amount controls.

The string section has the same pitch options as the synth section (16', 8', and 4') and features an attack/release envelope generator and an equalizer effect with low and high settings. It also includes vibrato, an ensemble effect, and a bowing effect that boosts the initial attack volume of new notes or chords, simulating the impact of bowing on strings.

The Trident features a built-in flanger effect that can be applied to any of the three sections via selection switches and has four dedicated controls to adjust the character of the effect. The joystick allows for pitch bending by moving right and left, and vibrato or trills by moving up or down, with their intensity and speed determined by respective controls. Trills can reach up to a minor 3rd interval.

The Trident features separate audio outputs for its synth, brass, and strings sections, along with two mixed outputs (high/low level) and a headphone output. This setup allows each part to be individually routed to external effects or different mixer channels for separate sound processing such as volume and panning. There are modulation inputs for expression, allowing for volume control of the three sections through a foot pedal or external CV source. Additionally, it features various filter CV inputs and a trigger input for the Brass section.

== MkII version ==
The Trident MkII, released in 1982, introduced several enhancements over its predecessor. Unlike the MkI, which required editing sounds from existing sounds, the MkII offered the ability to start with a blank preset. This model also addressed thermal issues with improved heat-sinking and a more robust power supply, leading to greater stability without altering the sound character.

Other changes included the removal of three piano preset sounds in favour of increased memory capacity, doubling the storage to 32 memory locations across four banks of eight, mirroring the configuration found on the Korg Polysix. The MkII version of the polysynth section features separate ADSR envelope generators for both the filter and VCA, unlike the MkI which had a single shared ADSR. This enhancement allows for more nuanced organ, harpsichord, and clavinet sounds.

== See also ==
- String synthesizer
