= Roland R-8 =

Drum machine

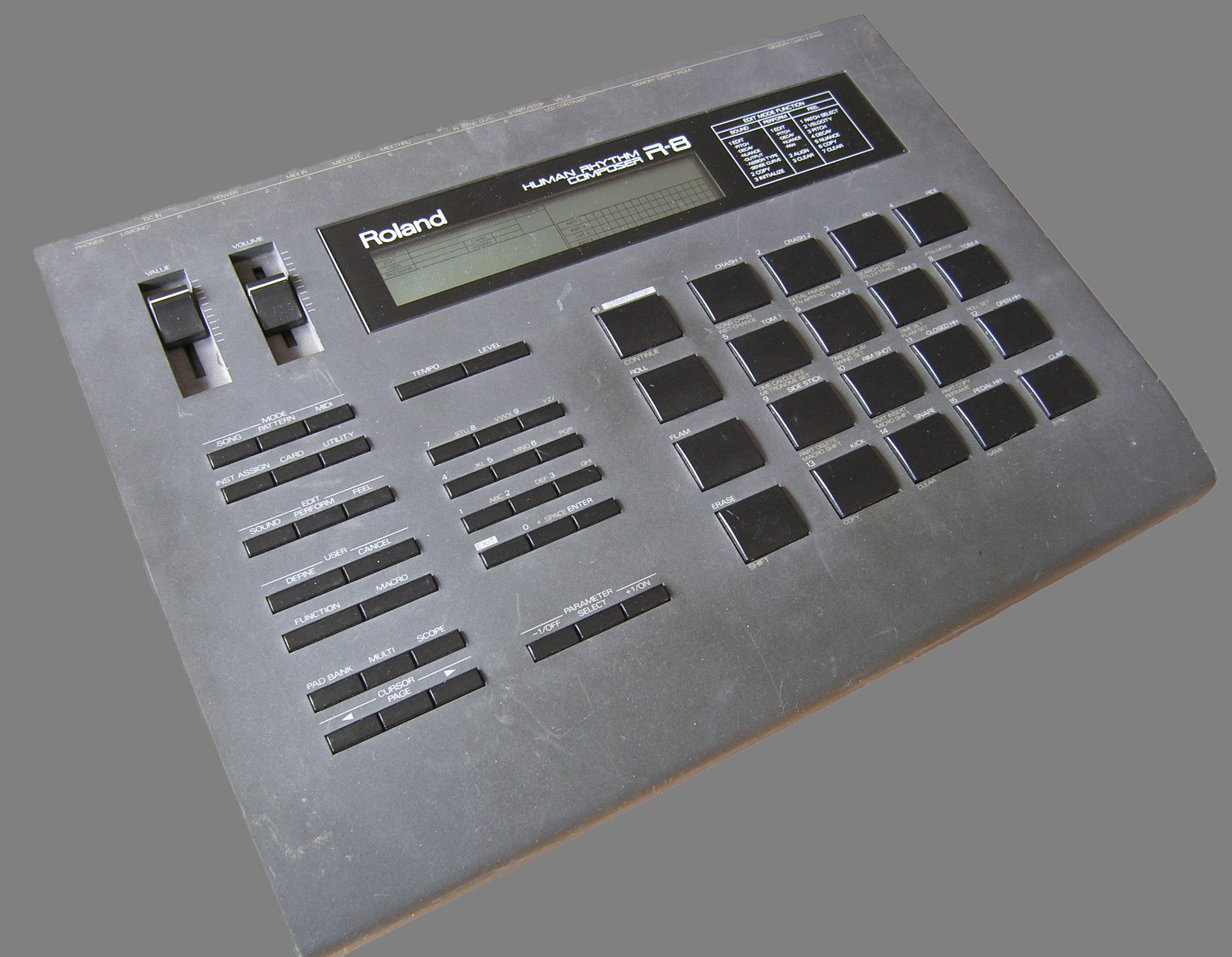
- Roland R-8 Human Rhythm Composer
- Manufacturer: Roland
- Dates: 1989 - 1996
- Price: UK£665

Technical specifications
- Polyphony: 32 voices
- Synthesis type: ROM
- Storage memory: 32 Preset Patterns, 100 User – Patterns, Maximum number of bars : 99, Memorized Data : Velocity / Pitch / Decay / Nuance / Pan / Micro Timing

Input/output
- External control: Start / Stop Jack, Value Jack, Tape Sync In Jack, Tape Sync Out Jack

The R-8 Human Rhythm Composer is an electronic drum machine introduced in 1989 by Roland Corporation, using PCM voices. The R-8 features velocity- and pressure-sensitive trigger pads, and the ability to create loops of beats. The device has eight individual outputs, 32-voice polyphony, and four-part multitimbral MIDI.

== Sounds and features ==
The Roland R-8 Human Rhythm Composer utilizes PCM voice technology and includes 68 built-in sounds. It supports expansion via ROM cards, which allow users to incorporate additional sounds. The machine offers extensive sound customization options through adjustable parameters such as pitch (which spans +/- four octaves), decay, and Nuance. The Nuance parameter modifies the timbre by simulating different strike positions on acoustic instruments.

The R-8 features velocity and pressure-sensitive pads, which are used for capturing the dynamics of a performance by mimicking the expressiveness of live percussion. The device is four-part multitimbral, enabling simultaneous playback of multiple sounds. The drum machine supports both real and step-time sequencing, with the capacity to create patterns up to 99 bars in length. It accommodates various time signatures and includes a micro-timing feature that allows adjustments to a resolution of 1/384th of a note for precise rhythmic placement.

The R-8 is equipped with Feel Patches that introduce variable changes in velocity, pitch, and other parameters to sequences, aiming to replicate the natural fluctuations of human playing. This function enhances the realism of the drum tracks produced by the R-8. It also features eight individual outputs, stereo outputs, and a headphone jack. It includes MIDI In, Out, and Thru ports, as well as FSK tape sync in and out, supporting synchronization with other devices and recording systems.

== Variants ==
The R-8M, a rackmount variant of the R-8 also introduced in 1989, omits the trigger pads and sequencer found in the desktop model. It features three front-facing ROM card slots, six individual outputs, and is designed to integrate with MIDI sequencers. Unlike the R-8, it lacks built-in pattern and song-recording capabilities, appealing to users who manage rhythm programming externally. The device includes a backlit LCD for navigation and editing.

In 1992, Roland released a second version of the R-8 drum machine, the R-8 MKII. The MKII version offers enhancements to the original R-8 drum machine, including additional sounds, more pattern memories, and refined programming features. It retains essential characteristics such as adjustable sound parameters—Pitch, Decay, and Nuance—and comprehensive rhythm programming capabilities.

Roland also released a trimmed-down version of the R8 in the form of the Roland R-5, which had fewer sounds and features than the R-8

== Sound cards ==
Below are the cards developed by Roland compatible with the R-8, R-8 MKII, and R-8M models:

- Roland SN-R8-01 - Contemporary Percussion
- Roland SN-R8-02 - Jazz Brush
- Roland SN-R8-03 - Sound Effects
- Roland SN-R8-04 - Electronic
- Roland SN-R8-05 - Jazz
- Roland SN-R8-06 - Ethnic Percussion
- Roland SN-R8-07 - Mallet
- Roland SN-R8-08 - Dry
- Roland SN-R8-09 - Power Drums U.S.A.
- Roland SN-R8-10 - Dance
- Roland SN-R8-11 - Metallic Percussion
