= Con Todo el Mundo =

Studio album by Khruangbin
- Released: January 26, 2018
- Genre: Psychedelic rock
- Length: 41:56
- Labels: Dead Oceans; Night Time Stories
- Producers: Khruangbin; Steve Christensen

Khruangbin chronology
| The Universe Smiles upon You (2015) | Con Todo el Mundo (2018) | Hasta El Cielo (2019) |

Singles from Con Todo El Mundo
- 1. "Maria También" Released: November 2, 2017; 2. "Friday Morning" Released: January 12, 2018

Con Todo el Mundo is the second studio album by American musical trio Khruangbin. It was released January 26, 2018, under Dead Oceans and Night Time Stories.

== Critical reception ==
Professional ratings
Aggregate scores
| Source | Rating |
|---|---|
| Metacritic | 78/100 |
Review scores
| Source | Rating |
| AllMusic | 3.5/5 stars |
| Clash | 9/10 |
| Exclaim! | 8/10 |
| The Line of Best Fit | 8.5/10 |
| NME | 4/5 stars |
| Pitchfork | 7.6/10 |

Con Todo el Mundo was met with widespread acclaim reviews from critics. Erin MacLeod of Pitchfork reviewed "Con Todo el Mundo crafts a unique, psychedelic vibe that hangs between continents and eras."

== Track listing ==
| No. | Title | Length |
|---|---|---|
| 1. | "Cómo Me Quieres" | 3:45 |
| 2. | "Lady and Man" | 4:18 |
| 3. | "Maria También" | 3:10 |
| 4. | "August 10" | 4:25 |
| 5. | "Cómo Te Quiero" | 4:02 |
| 6. | "Shades of Man" | 3:47 |
| 7. | "Evan Finds the Third Room" | 4:00 |
| 8. | "A Hymn" | 3:10 |
| 9. | "Rules" | 4:29 |
| 10. | "Friday Morning" | 6:50 |

== Certifications ==
| Region | Certification | Certified units/sales |
|---|---|---|
| United Kingdom (BPI) | Silver | 60,000^{‡} |
^{‡} Sales+streaming figures based on certification alone.
