= Rudy Rasmus =

American pastor

Rudy Rasmus is an American pastor, author, and humanitarian. He is co-pastor of the St. John's United Methodist Church located in downtown Houston, along with his wife Juanita. St. John's began with nine members in 1992.

== Biography ==
Rasmus was a monthly contributor to Oprah Winfrey's O Magazine. He completed a doctorate at United Theological Seminary. He is a 2008 gospel music industry Stellar Award nominee for the music project "Touch".

Rasmus founded a nonprofit corporation, the Bread of Life, Inc. with his wife in December 1992 and began serving dinners to the homeless in at St. John's. The Temenos CDC portfolio includes the Knowles-Temenos Apartments, a 43-unit Single Room Occupancy development, the 80-unit Temenos II Apartments both designed to provide permanent living accommodations for formerly homeless individuals, and the Temenos III Apartments designed for chronic inebriates and the most vulnerable homeless individuals in the Houston community. Kelly Rowland teamed up with Beyoncé and Tina Knowles to build the Knowles-Rowland Center for Youth.

St. John's provides HIV/AIDS testing to churchgoers on Sundays through the "Get Tested Project". Rudy received the Jefferson Award at a ceremony in Washington, DC in 2009.

Rasmus and his wife Juanita have been married for 34 years. They have two daughters.

== Publications ==
- Jesus Insurgency (with coauthor Dottie Escobedo-Frank; Abingdon Publishing, Nashville)
- Touch: Pressing against the wounds of a broken world (Thomas Nelson Publishers, Nashville)
- Love.Period – When all else fails
