= Mordechai (album) =

Studio album by Khruangbin
- Released: June 26, 2020
- Length: 43:53
- Labels: Dead Oceans; Night Time Stories
- Producers: Khruangbin; Steve Christensen

Khruangbin chronology
Texas Sun (2020)	Mordechai (2020)	Late Night Tales: Khruangbin (2020)

Singles from Mordechai
- 1. "Time (You and I)" Released: April 27, 2020; 2. "So We Won't Forget" Released: May 18, 2020; 3. "Pelota" Released: June 16, 2020

Mordechai is the third studio album by American musical trio Khruangbin. It was released June 26, 2020, under Dead Oceans and Night Time Stories.

== Critical reception ==
Professional ratings
Aggregate scores
Source	Rating
Metacritic	79/100
Review scores
Source	Rating
AllMusic	4/5 stars
Beats Per Minute	74%
Clash	8/10
Exclaim!	8/10
The Independent	3/5 stars
The Line of Best Fit	8/10
MusicOMH	3/5 stars
NME	5/5 stars
Pitchfork	5.8/10
Slant Magazine	4/5 stars

Mordechai has a score of 79 out of 100 on Metacritic, indicating "generally favorable reviews", based on 16 reviews. Dylan Barnabe of Exclaim! reviewed Mordechai as an ode to all that Khruangbin have achieved and a look forward to everything that is to come. Sophia Ordaz of Slant Magazine said "While past Khruangbin albums risked coming off merely as studied tributes to the microcosms of Thai and Iranian rock, Mordechai finds Khruangbin coming into their own, thanks to the band’s lyrical development and the honing of their fusion of intercontinental influences."

== Track listing ==
No.	Title	Length
1.	"First Class"	4:46
2.	"Time (You and I)"	5:42
3.	"Connaissais de Face"	4:20
4.	"Father Bird, Mother Bird"	3:05
5.	"If There is No Question"	5:53
6.	"Pelota"	2:47
7.	"One to Remember"	4:30
8.	"Dearest Alfred"	3:58
9.	"So We Won’t Forget"	4:58
10.	"Shida"	3:54
Total length:		43:53

Japanese edition (bonus tracks)
No.	Title	Length
11.	"Time (You and I)" (Karaoke Version)	5:42
12.	"If There is No Question" (Karaoke Version)	5:53
Total length:		55:33

== Charts ==
=== Weekly charts ===
Weekly chart performance for Mordechai
Chart (2020)	Peak position
Australian Albums (ARIA)	4
Austrian Albums (Ö3 Austria)	32
Belgian Albums (Ultratop Flanders)	4
Belgian Albums (Ultratop Wallonia)	133
Dutch Albums (Album Top 100)	5
French Albums (SNEP)	165
German Albums (Offizielle Top 100)	8
New Zealand Albums (RMNZ)	10
Scottish Albums (Official Charts)	6
Swedish Albums (Sverigetopplistan)	48
Swiss Albums (Schweizer Hitparade)	11
UK Albums (Official Charts)	7
US Billboard 200	31

=== Year-end charts ===
Year-end chart performance for Mordechai
Chart (2020)	Position
Belgian Albums (Ultratop Flanders)	139
