= Night Time Stories =

English independent record label

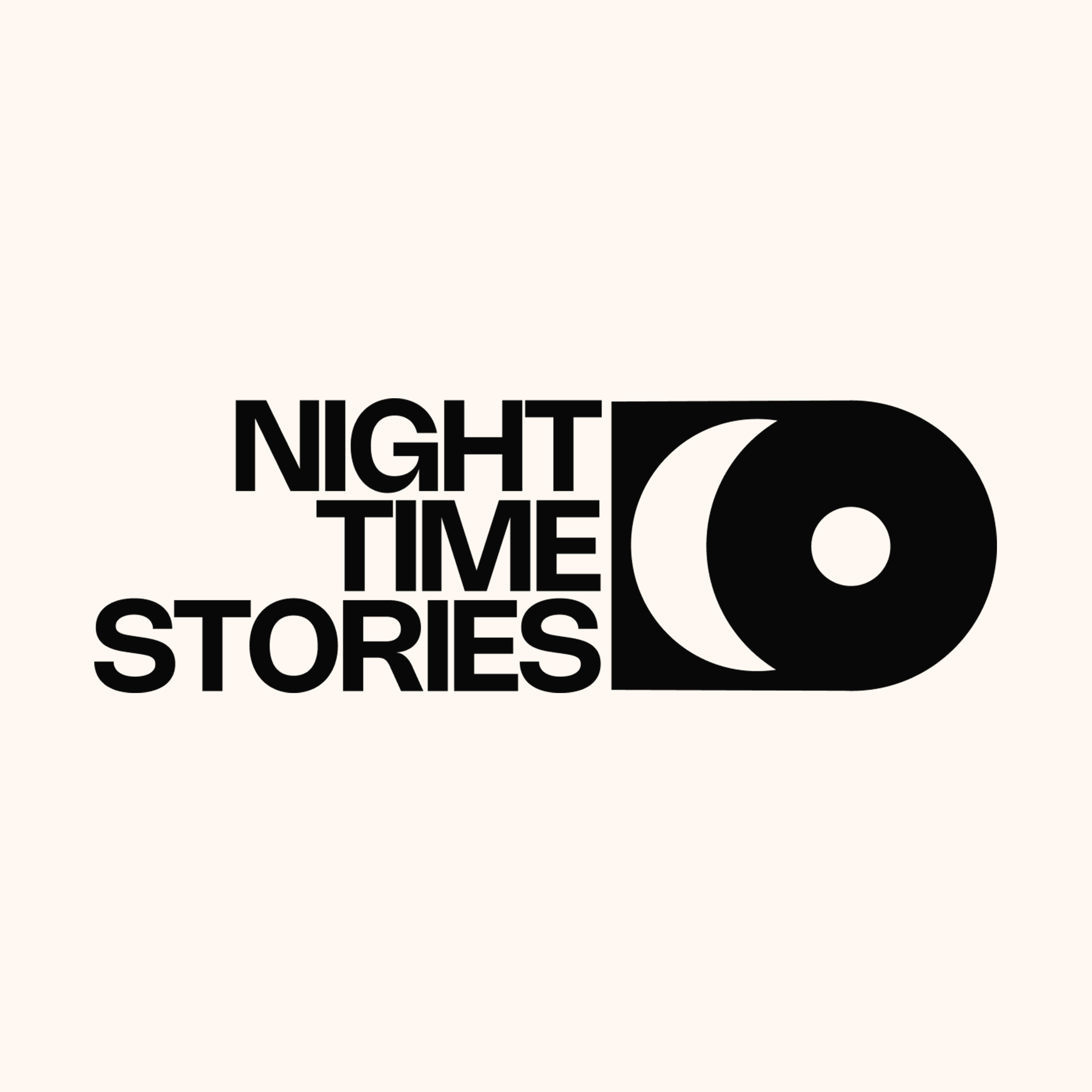
- Founded: 2009
- Founder: Paul Glancy
- Genre: Soul; jazz; funk; electronic; ambient
- Country of origin: United Kingdom
- Location: London
- Official website: nighttimestories.co.uk

Night Time Stories is an English independent record label founded by Paul Glancy in 2009. It is notable for releasing the Late Night Tales compilation series since 2009 by artists such as Trentemøller, Röyksopp, Bonobo, Jon Hopkins, Bill Brewster, Groove Armada, and Floating Points among many others, while label founder Glancy has been helming the project since 2003. In 2013, Night Time Stories started to release original material by artists such as Khruangbin, Session Victim, Leifur James, Sasha, Ash Walker, Ron Trent, Garden City Movement, and Rae & Christian.

== Releases ==
Name	Artist	Release date	Type
Mercury Rising	Rae & Christian	1 October 2013	Album
"A Calf Born in Winter"	Khruangbin	2013	Single
"The Infamous Bill"	Khruangbin	2014	Single
The Universe Smiles Upon You	Khruangbin	6 November 2015	Album
"People Everywhere (Still Alive)"	Khruangbin	16 March 2016	Single
Scene Delete	Sasha	1 April 2016	Album
Scene Delete Remixes 1	Sasha	7 October 2016	Album
Scene Delete Remixes 2	Sasha	1 February 2017	Album
Scene Delete Remixes 3	Sasha	31 March 2017	Album
Scene Delete: The Remixes	Sasha	19 May 2017	Album
Scene Delete: Barbican Numbered LTD Edition	Sasha		Album
True	Sasha	13 October 2017	Album
Con Todo el Mundo	Khruangbin	26 January 2018	Album
Apollonia	Garden City Movement	16 March 2018	Album
True (The Remixes)	Sasha	23 March 2018	Album
Safe	Chaouche	15 June 2018	Album
A Louder Silence	Leifur James	5 October 2018	Album
Progression	Chaouche	2 November 2018	EP
"Christmas Time Is Here"	Khruangbin	16 November 2018	Single
"Miss You (Under Shimokita Sky)"	Garden City Movement		Single
"Wurlitzer"	Leifur James	29 March 2019	Single
Hasta El Cielo (Con Todo El Mundo in Dub)	Khruangbin	12 July 2019	Album
Aquamarine	Ash Walker	19 July 2019	Album
A Louder Silence: Remixes	Leifur James	4 October 2019	EP
Texas Sun	Khruangbin & Leon Bridges	7 February 2020	Album
Departure	Kennebec	14 February 2020	Album
Needledrop	Session Victim	6 March 2020	Album
I Surrender	Song Sung	27 March 2020	EP
Angel in Disguise	Leifur James	5 May 2020	Album
Neddledrop Remixed	Session Victim	12 June 2020	Album
Mordechai	Khruangbin	26 June 2020	Album
What Do the Stars Say to You	Ron Trent	24 June 2022	Album
Without Star or Compass	Kennebec	28 October 2022	Album
Astronaut	Ash Walker	30 June 2023	Album
low key, low pressure	Session Victim	3 November 2023	Album
A La Sala	Khruangbin	5 April 2024	Album

== See also ==
- Late Night Tales
