= After Dark =

After Dark may refer to:

== Music ==
=== Albums ===
- After Dark (Kitty Wells album), 1959
- After Dark (Andy Gibb album) or the title song, 1980
- After Dark (Ray Parker Jr. album), 1987
- After Dark (Cruzados album), 1987
- After Dark (Music Revelation Ensemble album), 1992
- After Dark (Don Braden album), 1993
- After Dark (The Make-Up album), 1997
- After Dark (Hank Crawford album), 1998
- After Dark (Type O Negative album), a 1998 VHS and 2000 DVD
- After Dark, a 2003 EP by Scary Kids Scaring Kids
- After Dark (compilation album), a compilation album by the Italians Do It Better label, 2007
- Late Night Tales Presents After Dark, a DJ mix album by Bill Brewster, 2013
  - Late Night Tales Presents After Dark: Nightshift, 2014
  - Late Night Tales Presents After Dark: Nocturne, 2015

=== Songs ===
- "After Dark" (Little Birdy song), 2007
- "After Dark" (Asian Kung-Fu Generation song), 2007
- "After Dark" (The Count & Sinden song), 2010
- "After Dark" (Mr.Kitty song), 2014
- "After Dark (Carry Me Home)", by James Barker Band, 2026
- "After Dark", by Blue Öyster Cult from Fire of Unknown Origin, 1981
- "After Dark", by Drake from Scorpion, 2018
- "After Dark", by Kylie Minogue from Body Language, 2003
- "After Dark", by Le Tigre from This Island, 2004
- "After Dark", by Style of Eye, 2013
- "After Dark", by Tito & Tarantula from Tarantism, 1997
- "After Dark", by Coldrain from Nothing Lasts Forever, 2010
- "After Dark", by Hieroglyphis from 3rd Eye Vision, 1998

== Film and television ==
- After Dark (1915 film), a British silent film starring Eric Maxon
- After Dark (1932 film), a British crime film starring Hugh Williams
- After Dark (TV programme), a 1987–2003 British television discussion series
- After Dark (Australian TV series), a 1982–1985 late-night chat and music show hosted by Donnie Sutherland
- After Dark, a mini weekly talk-show with some of the cast and crew of the TV series Dark Matter
- After Dark Films, a film production company
- After Dark Horrorfest, an annual Horror movie festival in the USA

== Literature ==
- After Dark (comics), a 2010 science fiction limited series
- After Dark (magazine), an entertainment magazine published from 1968 to 1982
- After Dark (novel), a 2004 novel by Haruki Murakami
- After Dark (short story collection), an 1856 short story collection by Wilkie Collins
- After Dark, the newsletter of Coast to Coast AM
- After Dark, a book by David Harsent
- Afterdark, a series by Annie Dalton

== Other uses ==
- After Dark (drag act), a Swedish drag act
- After Dark (Boucicault play), written by Dion Boucicault
- After Dark (Farjeon play), a 1926 play by the British writer Joseph Jefferson Farjeon
- After Dark (software), a series of screensaver software products
- After Dark (Washington University in St. Louis), an a cappella group
- After Dark (whisky), a brand of Indian whisky
- After Dark, the stage name of the musician Carlos Berrios, who appeared on the album Live at the Social Volume 1
- After Dark, the first expansion park for the city building game Cities: Skylines

== See also ==
- After the Dark, a 2013 American film
