= Catch the Beat =

Anthology of Soul Underground magazine

Catch The Beat
- First edition cover
- Author: David Lubich
- Language: English
- Genre: Anthology
- Publisher: Djhistory.com
- Publication date: 2010
- Publication place: United Kingdom
- Media type: Print (hardback)
- Pages: 440
- ISBN: 0-9561896-4-4

Catch The Beat: The best of Soul Underground 1987–91 is an anthology of the UK-based music magazine Soul Underground, which ran from October 1987 to January 1991. The hardcover, 440-page book contains a selection of features, interviews, charts and news stories from each of Soul Underground's 38 issues. The majority of material is taken from high-resolution scans of the original magazines, though some of the news stories and all of the charts have been typeset and edited. The book was edited by Soul Underground's original editor and publisher David Lubich, who has written an introduction, arguing for the importance of the magazine and of the era in which it was published.

Writing in Orlando Weekly, Michaelangelo Matos said of the book: "It's a vibrant look back at a very creative time, one whose music charted the terrain of young Americans and Britons with a fierce commitment, with writing that was up to the music's unique challenges." Another reviewer described it as "A treasure trove/time capsule encapsulating one of the most exciting periods music has ever seen.
