= Gettin' It Together =

Single by Tommy Guerrero feat. Lyrics Born

from the album Soul Food Taqueria
- B-side: "Gettin' It Together" (Instrumental)
- Released: March 22, 2004
- Recorded: 2003; Function 8 Studio (San Francisco, California)
- Length: 3:23
- Label: Galaxia; GLX-21
- Songwriter(s): Tommy Guerrero
- Producer(s): Tommy Guerrero, Monte Vallier, Gadget

Tommy Guerrero singles chronology
"Come Together (Another Late Night)" (2002)	"Gettin' It Together" (2004)

"Gettin' It Together" is a song by former professional skateboarder and Quannum Projects-member Tommy Guerrero, released March 22, 2004 on the independent label Galaxia Records. The song was originally recorded for Guerrero's third studio album Soul Food Taqueria (2003), and features rapper Lyrics Born contributing vocals. It was released as a limited edition 12" vinyl single with the instrumental version as the b-side and a previously unreleased recording. The cover art for the single was designed by artist Stephen (ESPO) Powers, also the designer of the cover artwork for Soul Food Taqueria.

== Track listing ==
12" vinyl (ltd. edition)

1. "Gettin' It Together"
2. "Gettin' It Together" (Instrumental)
3. "Good Times a Comin'"

== Personnel ==
"Gettin' It Together"
The song features rapper Lyrics Born and contains elements of indie rock and lo-fi music.

Credits adapted from album sleeve liner notes.

Title	Notes
"Gettin' It Together"	Mixed by Monte Vallier and Gadget; Additional vocal production by Gadget; Vocals: Lyrics Born; Drums: Chuck Treece; All other instruments: Tommy Guerrero
