= Late Night Tales: Sly & Robbie =

Compilation album by Sly & Robbie
- Released: 14 July 2003
- Recorded: ?
- Genre: Reggae/Soul
- Length: 71:11
- Label: Azuli
- Producer: Sly & Robbie

Sly & Robbie chronology
Make Em Move/Taxi Style (2003)	Late Night Tales: Sly & Robbie (2003)	Romantic Reggae (2003)

Late Night Tales chronology
Nightmares on Wax (2003)	Sly & Robbie (2003)	Jamiroquai (2003)

Late Night Tales: Sly & Robbie is a DJ mix album, mixed by Sly & Robbie, released as part of the Late Night Tales / Another Late Night series.

The album contains a hidden track located before the first song, accessed on CD players by skipping backwards from the beginning of the first track. It is a four-minute instrumental cover version of Madonna's song "La Isla Bonita" as performed by Sly & Robbie.

== Track listing ==
1. "I L.O.V.E You 2002" - DJ DSL
2. "Coming Up For Air" - George Katsiris
3. "Woman to Woman" - Shirley Brown
4. "Quiet Storm" - Mobb Deep
5. "Toby" - The Chi-Lites
6. "Nights Over Egypt" - The Jones Girls
7. "Love Is The Message" - MFSB
8. "I'm In Love" - Evelyn "Champagne" King
9. "Manilla" (Headman version) - Seelenluft
10. "Reasons to be Cheerful, Part 3" - Ian Dury and the Blockheads
11. "I Just Want to Celebrate" - Rare Earth
12. "Patches" - Clarence Carter
13. "Who Write The Songs" - Jeymes Samuel & Canibus
14. "Superfly" - Curtis Mayfield
15. "Let's Stay Together - Al Green
16. "A Rose Is Still A Rose" - Aretha Franklin
17. "The Tracks of My Tears" - Smokey Robinson
18. "The White City Part 2" - read by Brian Blessed
