= Late Night Tales: David Shrigley =

Late Night Tales presents Shrigley Forced to Speak with Others

Compilation album by Late Night Tales
- Released: 23 October 2006
- Genre: Spoken Word
- Label: Azuli
- Producer: David Shrigley

Late Night Tales chronology
Late Night Tales: Air (2006)	Late Night Tales presents Shrigley Forced to Speak with Others (2006)	Late Night Tales: Nouvelle Vague (2007)

Late Night Tales: David Shrigley (a.k.a. Shrigley Forced to Speak with Others) is a special edition spoken word album recorded by David Shrigley, released as part of the Late Night Tales / Another Late Night series.

== Track listing ==
No.	Title	Artist(s)	Length
1.	"Rock Festival"	David Shrigley, John Shankie, Steven Sutcliffe
2.	"Eggs"	David Shrigley, Leigh Ferguson, Vrnda Daktor
3.	"Loathsome"	David Shrigley, Gavin Mitchell
4.	"I Am Good"	David Shrigley, Suzy Harvey, Vrnda Daktor
5.	"Snowman"	David Shrigley, Gavin Mitchell
6.	"Doctors"	David Shrigley, Holger Mohaupt, Suzy Harvey
7.	"Our Children"	David Shrigley, Kim McKinney, Suzy Harvey, Vrnda Daktor
8.	"The Jist"	David Shrigley
9.	"Sawing"	David Shrigley
10.	"What There Is"	David Shrigley, Alex Spaulding, Isaac Philipz-Young, Rafla Halldorsdottir, Sanjeev Kohli, Stan Shepherd
11.	"Questions"	David Shrigley
12.	"My Beer"	David Shrigley
13.	"Clumsy Father / You Don't Love Me"	David Shrigley, Suzy Harvey
14.	"Don'ts"	David Shrigley, Duncan Campbell
15.	"Hopping And Wiggling"	David Shrigley
16.	"Scribble"	David Shrigley
