= Late Night Tales: Matt Helders =

2008 DJ mix album by Matt Helders

Compilation album by Late Night Tales
- Released: 27 October 2008
- Genre: Electronica, house, hip hop
- Length: 1:09:05
- Label: Azuli
- Producer: Matt Helders

Late Night Tales chronology
Late Night Tales: Groove Armada (2008)	Late Night Tales: Matt Helders (2008)	Late Night Tales: Snow Patrol (2009)

Professional ratings
Review scores
Source	Rating
AllMusic	3/5 stars
The Guardian	4/5 stars
Record Collector	3/5 stars
MusicOMH	3/5 stars

Late Night Tales: Matt Helders is a 2008 DJ mix album, mixed by Matt Helders from the band Arctic Monkeys. It is the 21st album in the Late Night Tales/Another Late Night DJ series.

== Track listing ==
No.	Title	Artist(s)	Length
1.	"Connexion"	Goblin	3:13
2.	"Vaudeville Villain"	Viktor Vaughn	2:31
3.	"Yama Yama"	Yamasuki	2:12
4.	"Play The Drum"	Zeph & Azeem	3:26
5.	"Charity Shop Soundclash"	DJ Format Feat. Aspects	3:44
6.	"Free Salute"	Little Barrie	3:45
7.	"Thickfreakness"	The Black Keys	3:35
8.	"Dreamer" (Livin' Joy cover)	Matt Helders feat. Nesreen Shah	3:49
9.	"Dirt"	The Stooges	2:09
10.	"Sheba"	Johnny & The Hurricanes	2:21
11.	"The Dark Side of the Sun"	Modeselektor Feat. Puppetmastaz	3:34
12.	"Ms. Fat Booty"	Mos Def	4:03
13.	"I Got 5 on It (Original Clean Short Mix)"	Luniz	4:02
14.	"Grey Harpoon"	The Coral	2:11
15.	"Reasons"	Minnie Riperton	3:20
16.	"Dreamy Days"	Roots Manuva	4:19
17.	"Break The Lock"	Ty	3:45
18.	"I Believe"	Simian Mobile Disco	3:17
19.	"Olio"	The Rapture	6:55
20.	"A Choice of Three" (spoken word story)	Alex Turner	3:16

== Personnel ==
- Matt Helders − production, mixing, drums, keyboards
- Nesreen Shah − vocals (8)
- Alex Turner − spoken word (20)
