= Lose My Cool (disambiguation) =

"Lose My Cool" is a 1997 song by SWV.

Lose My Cool may also refer to:

- "Lose My Cool", a 2016 song by Foxes from the album All I Need
- "Lose My Cool", a 2017 song by Amber Mark from the album 3:33am
- Lose My Cool, a 2017 album by Ronika and its title track
- "Lose My Cool", a 2018 song by DNCE from the EP People to People
