= Alessi Brothers =

American pop rock duo

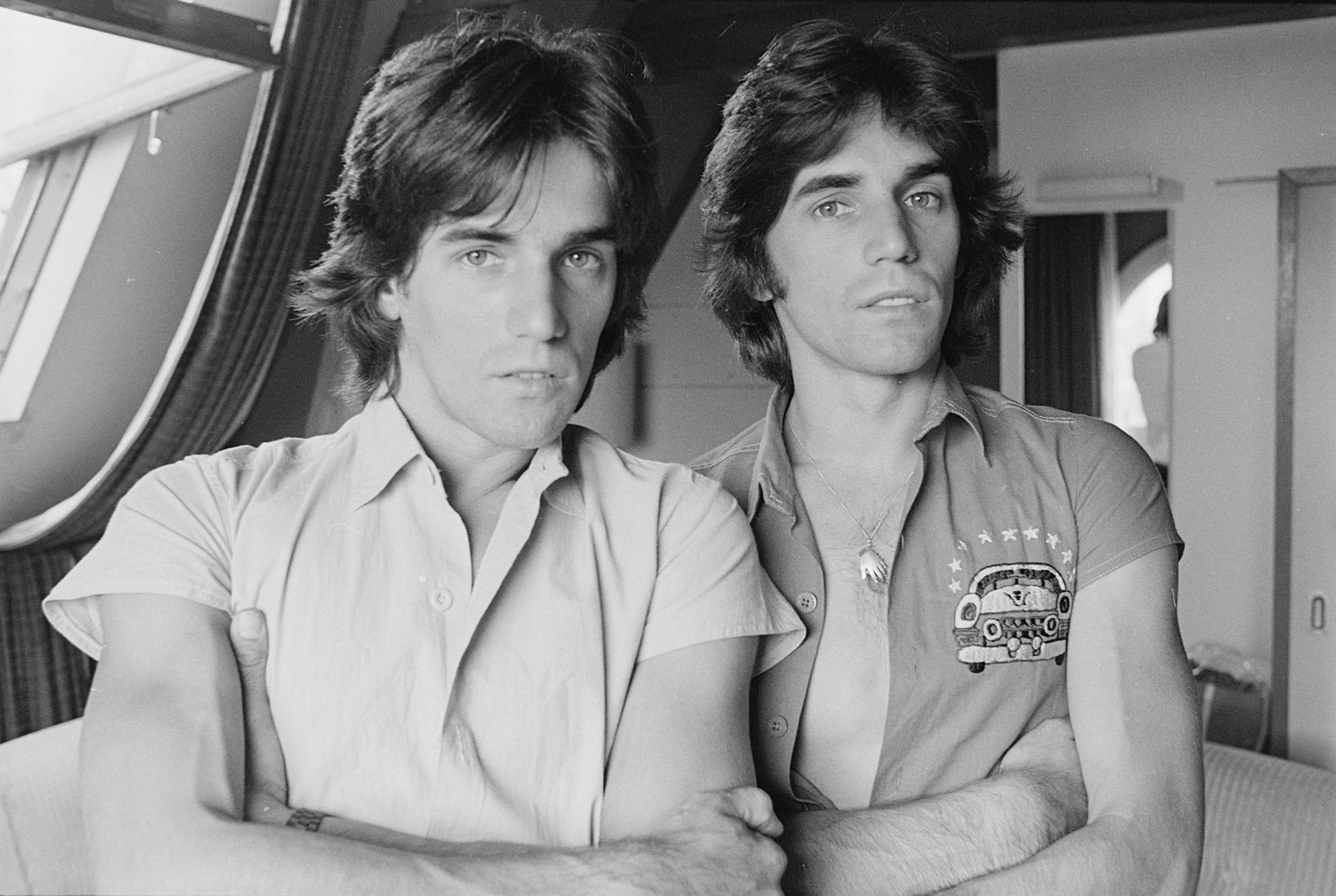
- Alessi Brothers, 1977

Background information
- Also known as: Alessi
- Born: July 12, 1953 (age 73); Long Island, New York
- Origin: Long Island, New York, United States
- Genres: Pop rock, soft rock
- Years active: 1976–present
- Labels: A&M, Qwest, Atlantic
- Spinoffs: Barnaby Bye
- Members: Billy Alessi; Bobby Alessi
- Website: alessibrothers.com

The Alessi Brothers, also known as Alessi, are an American pop rock singer-songwriter duo who first came to international prominence with their 1977 hit single "Oh, Lori". The duo are identical twin brothers, Billy and Bobby Alessi (born July 12, 1953, West Hempstead, New York).

== Career ==
In their early teens, the brothers attended West Hempstead High School and formed the band The Country Gentlemen with schoolmate Don Droege and drummer Bob Pelicane. The band often played at a teen club called The Mod Scene and Long Island summer beach club gigs, as well as playing at other venues which included Murray the K's World in Roosevelt Field, the Raleigh Hotel in the Catskills, and The Café Wha? in Greenwich Village. The band released one 45 single entitled "Saturday Night" which was credited to William Alessi.

The Country Gentlemen in 1967 evolved into The Look and recorded the single "If I were A Carpenter" b/w "Can You Do" on Verve Records.

In 1970, the Alessis were working in the Broadway cast of Hair, when former Blues Magoos guitarist Peppy Castro joined the show. The three formed the band Barnaby Bye and, with Mike Ricciardella on drums, the band were signed to Atlantic Records and released albums in 1972 (Room to Grow) and 1973 (Touch). The next Barnaby Bye album (Thrice Upon a Time) was not released until 2008, after the band reformed.

After the early years with Barnaby Bye, the brothers continued writing, recording and performing as the duo, Alessi. In 1977, their song "Oh Lori" (from the 1976 album Alessi) reached no. 8 and spent 11 weeks in the UK Singles Chart, and became a top ten hit in 17 more countries. In May 1982, "Put Away Your Love" (from the 1982 album Long Time Friends) reached No. 71 and spent four weeks in the US Billboard Hot 100. They also charted in Brazil with "Sad Songs" (from the album Alessi, 1976), "All for a Reason" (from the album All for a Reason, 1977) and "Forever" (recorded with Christopher Cross, from the album Long Time Friends, 1982). The first four Alessi albums (1976–1979) were released on the A&M record label, with the fifth, Long Time Friends (1982) being on Quincy Jones's Qwest label.

In 1984, Alessi released the track "Savin' the Day" for the soundtrack to the film Ghostbusters; this soundtrack album was released on the Arista label and was nominated for a Grammy Award for the Best Album of Original Score Written for a Motion Picture or Television Special.

Over the years Alessi have arranged, produced and/or written releases for many artists including Paul McCartney, Deborah Gibson, Frankie Valli, Richie Havens, Olivia Newton-John and Christopher Cross. The brothers toured with Andy Gibb in his 1978/79 Shadow Dancing tour and contributed background vocals to albums such as Art Garfunkel's 1979 album Fate for Breakfast and the John Lennon and Yoko Ono album Milk and Honey. Their songs have been covered by artists including Peter Frampton and Rick Springfield and their songwriting and/or vocals have been featured in such films as The Main Event and Ghostbusters.

The brothers have had success working on jingles and advertisements for David Lucas and many mainstream consumer products in the United States.

In the 2000s, they resumed their touring and album-recording career as a duo, with the new albums being released on the Eden Roc/Pink Records label. They resumed touring and recording as part of the group Barnaby Bye and, in 2012, were inducted into the Long Island Music Hall of Fame.

The 2012 compilation album from the Late Night Tales series, Late Night Tales: Metronomy by UK band Metronomy included "Seabird". The song was later included in the music over the closing credits of Taika Waititi's 2016 adventure-comedy Hunt for the Wilderpeople, the 2021 comedy-drama series Resident Alien, a season two episode of the 2022 television series Our Flag Means Death, a season 4 finale episode of Sex Education, over the closing credits of 2025 film Pillion, and over the closing credits of the series finale of the comedy series Hacks in 2026. A cover of “Seabird” was performed by Jari Jones as Marshmellow on the Season 15 episode of Bob's Burgers “Hope ‘N Mic Night”.

== Discography ==
=== Albums ===
- Alessi – (1976) – A&M
- All for a Reason – (1977) – A&M
- Driftin' – (1978) – A&M
- Words & Music – (1979) – A&M
- Long Time Friends – (1982) – Qwest
- Hello Everyone – (2003) – Eden Roc Records
- Just Like That – (2006) – Eden Roc Records
- Live! All Our Life – (2009) – Home of Jazz
- Two of Us – (2012) – Eden Roc Records
- Marathon Day – (2013) – Eden Roc Records
- Water – (2018) – Eden Roc Records
- Netherland - (2020)
- Eden Roc - (2022)

=== Singles ===
Year	Single	Peak chart positions										
Year	Single	AUS	BE (FLA)	BE (WA)	FRA	IRE	NL	SA	UK	US BB	US CB	ZIM
1977	"Don't Hold Back"	—	—	—	—	—	—	—	—	—	—	—
1977	"Seabird"	96	—	—	—	—	—	—	—	—	—	—
1977	"Oh, Lori"	76	20	10	16	14	4	—	8	—	84	13
1977	"Sad Songs"	—	—	—	—	—	—	—	—	—	—	—
1977	"Joanna" (Australia-only release)	85 (Note: "Joanna" first charted in September 1977 at number 85. However, it was then released as a double A-side single with "Oh, Lori", peaking at number 76 in December 1977.)	—	—	—	—	—	—	—	—	—	—
1977	"All for a Reason"	69	—	—	—	—	22	17	—	—	—	—
1978	"Hate to Be in Love" (promo-only release)	—	—	—	—	—	—	—	—	—	—	—
1978	"Farewell"/"London" (Netherlands-only release)	—	—	—	—	—	—	—	—	—	—	—
1978	"Driftin'"	86	—	—	—	—	—	—	—	—	—	—
1978	"Dancing in the Halls of Love"	—	—	—	—	—	—	—	—	—	—	—
1979	"Go All Night" (Japan-only release)	—	—	—	—	—	—	—	—	—	—	—
1979	"Gimme Some Lovin'"	—	—	—	—	—	—	—	—	—	—	—
1979	"I Wish That I Was Making Love (To You Tonight)"	—	—	—	—	—	—	—	—	—	—	—
1982	"Put Away Your Love"	—	—	—	—	—	—	—	—	71	79	—
1982	"Jagged Edge"	—	—	—	—	—	—	—	—	—	—	—
1982	"Forever" (with Christopher Cross)	—	—	—	—	—	—	—	—	—	—	—
1982	"As Far as I'm Concerned"	—	—	—	—	—	—	—	—	—	—	—
"—" denotes releases that did not chart or were not released

=== Contributions to film soundtrack ===
- 1979: The Main Event – backing vocals on three tracks (Columbia)
- 1984: Ghostbusters – "Savin' the Day" (Arista)
- 2016: Hunt for the Wilderpeople – "Seabird"

== In popular culture ==
Alessi (アレッシー Aresshī), a minor antagonist from the Japanese manga series Stardust Crusaders, is named after the duo.

Their song "Seabird" was used for the mission "Howard" in the 2023 video game Marvel's Spider-Man 2.

"Seabird" was used during the credits of the movie Hunt for the Wilderpeople, written and directed by Taika Waititi.

"Seabird" appears at the end of the episode "fun and games" of the TV series Our Flag Means Death.

“Seabird” was featured in Season 15 of Bob's Burgers. This rendition was sung by the character Marshmallow at an open-mic event.

“Seabird” was featured in the series finale of Sex Education, where Aimee works on healing from her assault by burning the jeans she was wearing on the bus.

A duet version of "Seabird" was covered by Ewan McGregor and his daughter Clara McGregor on the soundtrack of Bleeding Love (2023), a coming-of-age film the two collaborated on.

"Seabird" was featured in the credits of the 2025 film Pillion.

“Seabird” was featured in Season 5, Episode 7 of Hacks.

== See also ==
- List of former A&M Records artists
