= Scene Delete =

Studio album by Sasha
- Released: 1 April 2016
- Genre: Electronic; ambient
- Length: 75:02
- Label: Late Night Tales; Night Time Stories
- Producer: Alexander Coe

Sasha chronology
Involv3r (2013)	Scene Delete (2016)	Scene Delete: The Remixes (2017)

Late Night Tales chronology
Late Night Tales: Nils Frahm (2015)	Late Night Tales Presents Sasha: Scene Delete (2016)	Late Night Tales: Ólafur Arnalds (2016)

Singles from Scene Delete
- 1. "View2" Released: 2 February 2016; 2. "Warewolf" Released: 23 February 2016; 3. "Bring on the Night-Time" Released: 29 March 2016; 4. "Pontiac" Released: 17 June 2016

Professional ratings
Review scores
Source	Rating
Exclaim!	8/10
Louder than War	7.5/10
Resident Advisor	2.8/5

Scene Delete (known in full as Late Night Tales Presents Sasha: Scene Delete) is the third studio album by Welsh DJ Sasha. It was released on 1 April 2016 through Late Night Tales on British independent record label Night Time Stories. The album has been described as "unabashedly ambient" and Sasha described it as "a split in [his] career". Upon release, the album appeared on the UK Albums Chart, peaking at number 34. Four singles were released from the album: "View2", "Warewolf", "Pontiac", and "Bring on the Night-Time". In 2017, three remix singles were released comprising remixes of songs from the album, before a remix album, Scene Delete: The Remixes, was released on 19 May 2017.

== Background ==
The album was intended as an appreciation of "post-minimalist modern classical" music, with Sasha citing Max Richter, Nils Frahm, Brian Eno, and Steve Reich as influences for the composition of the album. In a press release with Billboard on the topic of the album's composition prior to its release, Sasha stated:

Whenever I'm in the studio and I've been working on techno or club music, I immediately want to work on something more textural and ambient. It just kept piling up. I was thinking about releasing an album that had all my club records and my ambient stuff on it, but it didn't seem like it would fit together.

Scene Delete was originally intended to be a compilation album, like the majority of Late Night Tales releases. Sasha has noted his inspiration from Jon Hopkins' Late Night Tales album (Late Night Tales: Jon Hopkins), which contained some of Hopkins' original works as well as other people's music. After sending Late Night Tales original works for Scene Delete, Sasha had prepared to license other people's music for the album before the record label proposed that the album be entirely original.

== Release ==
The album was officially announced on 2 February 2016, and the second track, "View2", was shared to Late Night Tales' SoundCloud account. On 1 April 2016, the album saw a digital download and streaming release, as well as a physical release on CD, vinyl, and box set. A remix album for Scene Delete was released on 19 May 2017. A "barbican collectors edition" was released on 20 May 2017. Upon its initial release, Scene Delete appeared on the UK and UK Dance Albums charts, peaking at number 34 and number 3 respectively. It also charted in the US, reaching number 6 in the Billboard Dance/Electronic Albums chart.

== Track listing ==
Scene Delete track listing
No.	Title	Length
1.	"Channel Deq"	1:59
2.	"View2"	4:28
3.	"Baracus"	6:16
4.	"Linepulse"	4:01
5.	"Time After Time"	4:16
6.	"Detour"	5:20
7.	"Pontiac"	5:16
8.	"Cassette Sessions D"	3:10
9.	"Cassette Sessions E"	2:31
10.	"Healer"	1:36
11.	"Modcon"	2:56
12.	"Scarpa Falls"	4:51
13.	"Warewolf"	5:35
14.	"Bring on the Night-Time" (featuring Ultraista)	5:55
15.	"Corvette"	0:25
16.	"Shelter"	3:57
17.	"Untitled 3"	1:07
18.	"Abacus"	2:04
19.	"Rooms"	5:30
20.	"Broadcast"	0:53
21.	"Vapour Trails"	2:59
Total length:		75:02

Beatport bonus track
No.	Title	Length
1.	"Late Night Tales Presents Sasha: Scene Delete" (Continuous Mix)	74:59

iTunes bonus track
No.	Title	Length
22.	"Late Night Tales Presents Sasha: Scene Delete" (Continuous Mix)	75:00

== Charts ==
Chart performance for Scene Delete
Chart (2016)	Peak position
UK Albums (Official Charts Company)	34
UK Dance Albums (Official Charts Company)	3
US Dance/Electronic Albums (Billboard)	6
