= Late Night Tales: Fatboy Slim =

Compilation album by Fatboy Slim
- Released: 15 October 2007
- Genres: Electronic dance music, pop, funk, soul, reggae
- Label: Azuli
- Producer: Fatboy Slim

Fatboy Slim chronology
The Greatest Hits – Remixed (2007)	Late Night Tales: Fatboy Slim (2007)	Here Lies Love (2010)

Late Night Tales chronology
Lindstrøm (2007)	Fatboy Slim (2007)	Groove Armada (2008)

Singles from Late Night Tales: Fatboy Slim
- 1. "Radioactivity" Released: October 8, 2007

Professional ratings
Review scores
Source	Rating
Allmusic	3.5/5 stars

Late Night Tales: Fatboy Slim is the 19th DJ mix album released in the Late Night Tales series on Late Night Tales. It was mixed by British DJ Fatboy Slim.

== Track listing ==
No.	Title	Writer(s)	Length
1.	"Spanish Stroll"	Mink DeVille
2.	"Roadrunner"	Modern Lovers
3.	"I Love the Sound of Breaking Glass"	Nick Lowe
4.	"Midnight Rider"	Paul Davidson
5.	"Express Yourself"	Hopeton Lewis
6.	"Monkey Spanner"	Dave & Ansell Collins
7.	"Ire Feelings (Leggo Skanga)"	Rupie Edwards
8.	"Three Piece Suit"	Trinity
9.	"Wish I Didn't Miss You"	Angie Stone
10.	"I Can Dig It Baby"	Little Beaver
11.	"Your Kiss Is Sweet"	Syreeta
12.	"I'll Keep a Light In My Window"	Ben Vereen
13.	"Brother Where Are You?" ("Matthew Herbert remix" version from Verve//Remixed 2)	Oscar Brown Jr.
14.	"Mory"	Yoro Kery Goro
15.	"Linus and Lucy"	Vince Guaraldi Trio
16.	"Blue Skies"	Willie Nelson
17.	"Just Dropped In (To See What Condition My Condition Was In)"	Kenny Rogers & The First Edition
18.	"Don't Lay Your Funky Trip on Me"	Señor Soul
19.	"Radioactivity"	Kraftwerk
20.	"Who Loves the Sun"	The Velvet Underground
21.	"Zombie Jamborie"	Sandpebbles
22.	"From a Logical Point of View"	Robert Mitchum
23.	"Satisfied 'N' Tickled Too"	Taj Mahal
24.	"My World"	Sly & The Family Stone
25.	"Tema Da Desilusao Garota De Ipanema"	Tom Jobim
26.	"Everything Is Everything"	Bootsy Collins
