= Music for Pleasure =

Music for Pleasure may refer to:

- Music for Pleasure (record label), a United Kingdom record label that issued budget-priced albums
- Music for Pleasure (band), a new wave band from Leeds, England
- Music for Pleasure (The Damned album), the second album by punk rock band The Damned
- Music for Pleasure (Monaco album), the first album by synthpop band Monaco
- Late Night Tales: Music For Pleasure, a DJ mix album by Tom Findlay
- Music for Pleasure, a classical music radio program presented by John Cargher in Australia
