= Tommy Guerrero =

American musician, composer, and skateboarder

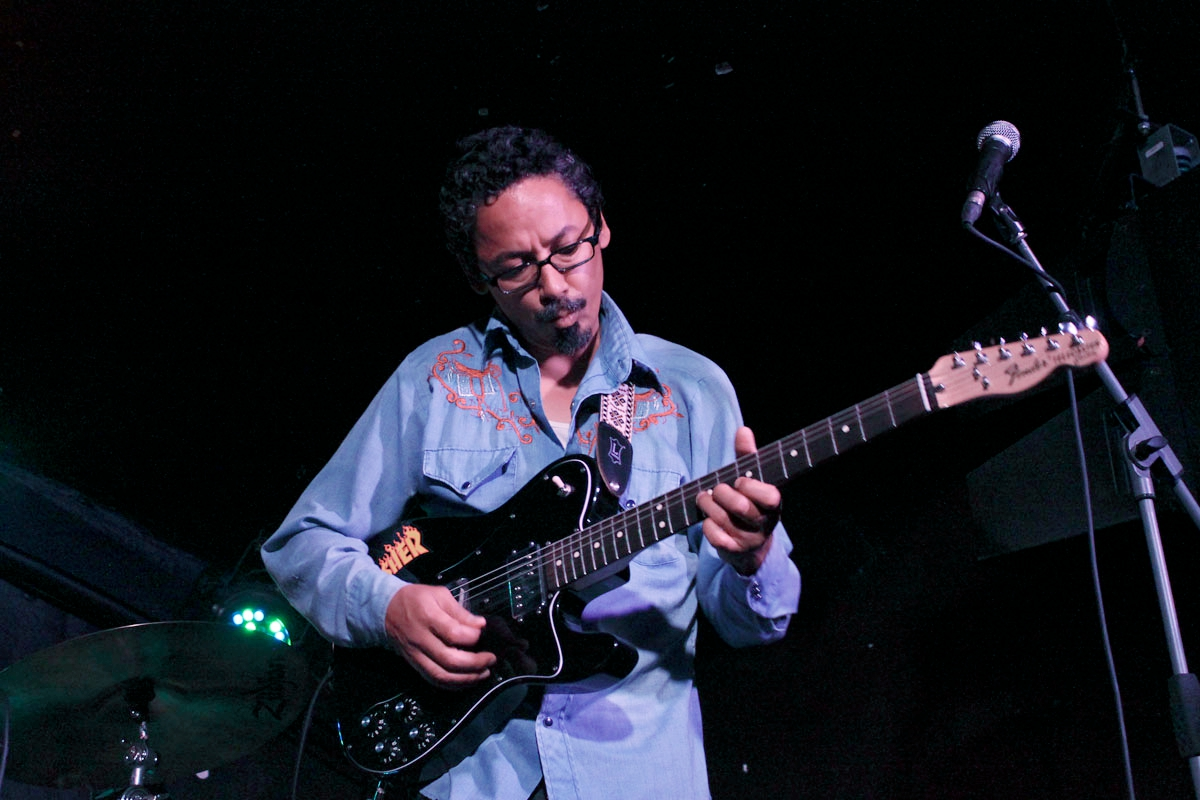
- Guerrero performing in 2014

Background information
- Born: Thomas Marc Gurrero; September 9, 1966 (age 60); San Francisco, California, U.S.
- Genres: Downtempo, art rock, alternative rock, electronic, funk, soul, jazz
- Occupations: Musician, composer, skateboarder
- Instruments: Guitar, bass, percussion, keyboards
- Years active: 1980–present
- Website: tommyguerrero.com

Thomas Marc Guerrero (born September 9, 1966) is an American musician, composer, and professional skateboarder. He is a former member of the Bones Brigade, a prominent skateboarding team of the 1980s that also included Tony Hawk and Steve Caballero.

== Early life ==
Guerrero was born in San Francisco, California. He is of Ohlone, Chilean, and Filipino descent from his father's side.

== Career ==
=== Skateboarding ===
As a teenager, Guerrero was one of the prominent members of the Bones Brigade, Powell Peralta's professional skateboarding team that was successful during the 1980s. He was well known for his relaxed style of street skateboarding and his Bones Brigade footage was primarily filmed in his hometown of San Francisco—the videos Future Primitive, The Search for Animal Chin, Public Domain, and Ban This all featured the street skateboarding of Guerrero. After riding for Powell Peralta, Guerrero and Jim Thiebaud, a hometown friend and Powell Peralta teammate, started the skateboarding company "Real".

=== Music ===
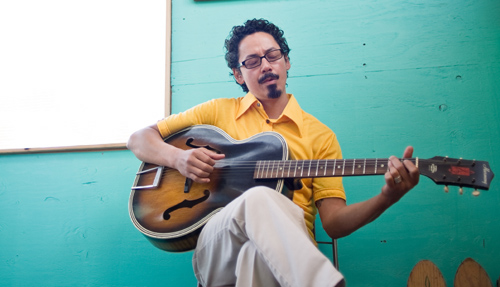
Guerrero in 2012

After his success in the world of skateboarding, Guerrero decided to pursue his musical interests and was a member of the skate rock band Free Beer, punk rock bands Jerry's Kids and Revenge, and the instrumental post-rock group Jet Black Crayon, in addition to releasing many albums under his own name. Guerrero's music touches on multiple genres, including rock, hip-hop, funk, soul, and jazz.

The skateboarding video game Skate has featured numerous unreleased compositions that were written and recorded by Guerrero. One of Guerrero's songs, "Organism", was featured in the 2005 video game Tony Hawk's American Wasteland.

== Awards and accolades ==
In 2004, Rolling Stone magazine named Guerrero's third studio album, Soul Food Taqueria (2003), #2 on its 2003 "Best of" list.

At the 2013 15th Annual Transworld SKATEboarding Awards, Guerrero was the recipient of the "Legend" award—on the red carpet preceding the awards event, Guerrero stated:

"I'm super grateful, that anyone really cares, to be honest. Um ... conflicted; I'm not one to rest on my laurels and it's hard to accept accolades for something you did thirty years ago, you know? I'd rather be appreciated for what I do now, but I ... I ... I'm super grateful ... I can't believe it [street skateboarding in the 21st century]. I mean the technical aspect, and the consistency, combined with that, is mind-blowing ... but just where it's at now, is, is insane; I mean, what Rodney [Mullen] sort of started, with the technical aspect, to a whole another level, you know? Making it extremely gnarly, extremely technical ... I'd hate to be growing up skating now ..."

Following his receipt of the Transworld "Legend" award, Guerrero invited all "street skaters" onto the stage to stand alongside him at the Avalon Theater in Hollywood, California, US.

== Discography ==
=== Albums ===
- Loose Grooves & Bastard Blues (1998)
- A Little Bit of Somethin' (2000)
- Soul Food Taqueria (2003)
- From the Soil to the Soul (2006)
- Return of the Bastard (2008)
- Lifeboats & Follies (2011)
- No Man's Land (2012) – released in Japan
- The Composer Series – Vol. 4 (2xCD) (unknown)
- Perpetual (2015) – digital release
- Road to Knowhere (2018)
- Dub Session (2019)
- Sunshine Radio (2021)
- Amber of Memory (2023)

=== Singles ===
- "Backintheday" (1995)
- "Junk Collector" (2001)
- "Rusty Gears Lonely Years" / "Organism" (2001)
- "Gettin' It Together" (2004)

=== EPs ===
- backintheDay+fotraque 7inch (2002)
- Year of the Monkey – EP (2005)

=== Concept albums ===
- Living Dirt (2010)

=== Collaborations ===
- Hoy Yen Ass'n (collaboration with former Jet Black Crayon member Gadget) (2000)
- Guerrero y Gonzales – (What It Isn't) (collaboration with Mark Gonzales, released in Japan) (2001)
- Guerrero also compiled and mixed a DJ mix album for the Azuli Records' Late Night Tales / Another Late Night series in 2002, Another Late Night: Tommy Guerrero
- BLKTOP PROJECT – Blktop Project (collaboration with Ray Barbee, Matt Rodriguez, Doug Scharin and Chuck Treece) (2007)
- skate. (Original Soundtrack) - with XXXChange and DJ Z-Trip (2007)
- Lord Newborn and The Magic Skulls (collaboration with Money Mark and Shawn Lee) (2009)
- BLKTOP PROJECT – Lane Change (collaboration with Ray Barbee, Matt Rodriguez, Doug Scharin and Chuck Treece) (2009)
- BLKTOP PROJECT – Concrete Jungle (2016)
