= Late Night Tales: Groove Armada =

Compilation album by Groove Armada
- Released: 12 March 2008
- Recorded: ?
- Length: 75:32
- Label: Azuli
- Producer: Groove Armada

Groove Armada chronology
GA10: 10 Year Story (2007)	Late Night Tales: Groove Armada (2008)	Black Light (2010)

Late Night Tales chronology
Late Night Tales: Fatboy Slim (2007)	Late Night Tales: Groove Armada (2008)	Late Night Tales: Matt Helders (2008)

Late Night Tales: Groove Armada is a DJ mix album, mixed by the English electronic dance music duo Groove Armada, released as part of Late Night Tales / Another Late Night DJ series.

== Track listing ==
1. The Things That Dreams Are Made Of - The Human League
2. Love Is the Drug - Roxy Music
3. Glad to Know You - Kitty Grant
4. Enjoy the Silence - Depeche Mode
5. Elle and Moi - Max Berlin
6. Makin' a Living - The African Dream
7. Roscoe (Beyond the Wizard's Sleeve Remix) - Midlake
8. Get the Message - Electronic
9. Son of Dragon - Liquid People
10. How Long - Ace
11. Josephine - Chris Rea
12. Friday's Child - Will Young
13. You're All I Need to Get By - Marvin Gaye & Tammi Terrell
14. Are 'Friends' Electric? - Groove Armada
15. The Chills - Peter Bjorn & John
16. Close to Me - The Cure
17. Even After All - Finley Quaye
18. Happy Detective Pt.1 - Will Self
