= Late Night Tales: Air =

Compilation album (mixtape) by Air
- Released: 11 September 2006
- Genre: Pop
- Length: 1:03:27
- Label: Azuli
- Producer: Air

Air chronology
Talkie Walkie (2004)	Late Night Tales: Air (2006)	Pocket Symphony (2007)

Late Night Tales chronology
Belle & Sebastian (2006)	Air (2006)	David Shrigley (2006)

Professional ratings
Review scores
Source	Rating
Pitchfork Media	(7.8/10)

Late Night Tales: Air is the 15th DJ mix album released in the Late Night Tales series. It was mixed by Jean-Benoît Dunckel from French band Air and was originally intended as the 14th release (scheduled for 3 October 2005) but was delayed several times. In the meantime, Late Night Tales: Belle & Sebastian was released. The Air compilation was eventually released on 11 September 2006.

== Track listing ==
1. "All Cats are Grey" – The Cure
2. "Planet Caravan" – Black Sabbath
3. "O' Venezia Venaga Venusia" – Nino Rota
4. "I Shall Be Released" – The Band
5. "Camille" – Georges Delerue
6. "Ghosts" – Japan
7. "The Old Man's Back Again" – Scott Walker
8. "Come Wander With Me" – Jeff Alexander
9. "Metal Heart" – Cat Power
10. "Lovin' You" – Minnie Riperton
11. "For the World" – Tan Dun
12. "Le long de la rivière tendre" – Sébastien Tellier (English: Along the loving river, from the soundtrack of "Narco")
13. "My Autumn's Done Come" – Lee Hazlewood
14. "P.L.A." – Robert Wyatt
15. "Let's Get Lost" – Elliott Smith
16. "Cousin Jane" – The Troggs (from "Trogglodynamite")
17. "Musica" – Air/Alessandro Baricco
18. "Pavane pour une infante défunte" – composed by Maurice Ravel, performed by The Cleveland Symphony Orchestra (English: Pavane for a dead princess)
