= Late Night Tales: Lindstrøm =

2007 DJ mix album by Lindstrøm

Compilation album by Lindstrøm
- Released: 9 July 2007
- Studio: Red Light, England
- Genre: Electronic music
- Label: Azuli
- Producer: Lindstrøm

Lindstrøm chronology
It's a Feedelity Affair (2006)	Late Night Tales: Lindstrøm (2007)	Where You Go I Go Too (2008)

Late Night Tales chronology
Nouvelle Vague (2007)	Lindstrøm (2007)	Fatboy Slim (2007)

Late Night Tales: Lindstrøm is a 2007 DJ mix, the 18th released in the Late Night Tales series by Night Time Stories. It was mixed and produced by the Norwegian DJ Lindstrøm.

== Track listing ==
All music is composed by Lindstrøm

No.	Title	Artist	Length
1.	"To You"	Alf Emil Eik	4:10
2.	"Baby Let Me Kiss You" (composed by King Floyd)	Fern Kinney	4:33
3.	"Kaddish"	Gina X Performance	3:33
4.	"In Time"	Sly and the Family Stone	3:35
5.	"Why"	Carly Simon	3:36
6.	"Born to Synthesize"	Todd Rundgren	2:17
7.	"North Beach"	George Duke	5:08
8.	"Conversational"	Dominique Leone	3:38
9.	"I Won't Hurt You" (composed by Shaun Harris, Michael J. Lloyd, and Bob Markley)	Anja Garbarek	3:02
10.	"Pan Americana"	Rainer Bloss	3:52
11.	"Reinbågan" (composed by Patrick Adams and Peter Brown)	Todd Terje and Prins Thomas	2:21
12.	"Energie"	Jean-Philippe Goude	3:31
13.	"Grand Drums"	Smash Band	00:41
14.	"Law of Life"	Farah	6:23
15.	"Let It Happen" (cover of the song by Vangelis)	Lindstrøm and Solale	6:02
16.	"Baby Blue" (composed by Geoff Downes, Trevor Horn, and Bruce Woolley)	Dusty Springfield	2:26
17.	"Pressure"	Pekka Pohjola	6:16
18.	"Coconut Grove" (composed by John Sebastian)	The Lovin' Spoonful	5:14
19.	"Buenos Aires 2am"	Rob Hindle	2:21
Total length:			1:12:39
