= Soul Underground =

British music magazine

- Soul Underground issue 34
- Editor & Publisher: David Lubich
- Categories: Music magazine
- Frequency: Monthly
- Circulation: 12,500 (1990 – peak circulation)
- Publisher: Soul Underground Ltd.
- Founded: 1987
- Final issue: January 1991
- Country: United Kingdom
- Language: English

Soul Underground was a UK-based music magazine covering "underground" black music and dance music, which launched in October 1987 and ceased publication in January 1991. The magazine was conceived as a reaction to what co-founders Darren Reynolds and David Lubich saw as the failure of the mainstream music press to cover the growth of an underground dance music scene in the UK. This went beyond the music itself to the fashions, warehouse parties and subcultures that were finding their feet at the time.

From the outset, Soul Underground sought to cover a wide range of music – from the burgeoning "Rare Groove" scene of the late 1980s, though rap, electro, house to reggae and soul. It quickly gained a reputation for its provocative features and news reports, and its interest in writing about music from a historical and even political perspective. Its perceived credibility among musicians, club and radio DJs and journalists meant that it was able to attract a very strong team of writers and photographers.

The magazine was founded as a fanzine: its first issue had a print run of just 850 copies, and was distributed through record shops. Sales grew quickly, leading to a disagreement between Reynolds and Lubich over the direction the magazine should take (Reynolds wanted to preserve its "fanzine" ethos, while Lubich believed that it could evolve into a "proper" magazine without compromising its independence and credibility). Reynolds left the magazine at issue 7, leaving Lubich as publisher and editor.

As dance music made the move from underground scene to huge commercial success, Soul Underground saw its sales and profile rise. National newsagent distribution followed in late 1989, as did limited distribution through record and clothing stores in New York.

In early 1990, Soul Underground gained a presence in New York – both in terms of sales and editorial coverage. It appointed as New York editor Leonard Abrams, former editor of the East Village Eye, who built a roster of writers and photographers and helped the magazine stay on top of the city's burgeoning hip-hop scene.

== Notable firsts ==
Soul Underground′s network of music and culture obsessives gave it an edge in reporting on a number of hugely influential developments. It was the first magazine to cover the "Bristol Scene", ran the first major interview with A Guy Called Gerald and championed the emergence of a new generation of black comedians, including Angie Le Mar.

== A career launchpad ==
Although Soul Underground employed a number of established journalists, it gained a reputation for its "open door" policy and for an ability to spot and nurture talent. A passion for music was more important than formal journalistic skills. In this way, the magazine proved to be something of a career launch pad. Some of the writers, artists, photographers and DJs associated with the magazine stayed within the media, while others moved into music and fashion.

Although critically successful and intermittently profitable, Soul Underground was under-capitalised and unable to cope financially with the sudden drop in ad revenue that occurred around the end of 1990. Unable to secure financial backing, Lubich was forced to close Soul Underground in January 1991.

== Anthology: Catch The Beat ==
An anthology entitled Catch the Beat: The best of Soul Underground 1987–91 was published by Djhistory.com in October 2010. The hardcover, 440-page book contains a selection of features, interviews, charts and news stories from each of Soul Underground′s 38 issues. Catch The Beat has received overwhelmingly positive reviews from music magazines including Mojo and Record Collector, and from DJs including Greg Wilson, who has written about it at his blog.
