= Late Night Tales: Jamiroquai =

Compilation album by Jamiroquai
- Released: 10 November 2003
- Recorded: 2003
- Genre: Funk, R&B, soul, disco, rock
- Length: 1:17:40
- Label: Azuli
- Compiler: Jamiroquai

Jamiroquai chronology
A Funk Odyssey (2001)	Late Night Tales: Jamiroquai (2003)	Dynamite (2005)

Late Night Tales chronology
Sly & Robbie (2003)	Jamiroquai (2003)	Turin Brakes (2004)

Professional ratings
Review scores
Source	Rating
AllMusic	3/5 stars

Late Night Tales: Jamiroquai is compilation album curated by British funk/acid jazz band Jamiroquai. Released on 10 November 2003, the album is the tenth release in the Late Night Tales series. A special edition of the album was released in September 2005, with the addition of a Buffalo Man embossed slipcase. The album was re-mastered and re-released in November 2010, and is now available on iTunes.

== Track listing ==
No.	Title	Writer(s)	Original artist	Length
1.	"Happiness" (from Energy, 1978)	Allen Toussaint	The Pointer Sisters	3:53
2.	"Girl, I Think The World About You" (from Hot on the Tracks, 1976)	Lionel Richie; Thomas McClary	Commodores	4:26
3.	"Once You Get Started" (single, 1975)	Gavin Christopher	Rufus & Chaka Khan	4:10
4.	"Fantasy" (from Gears, 1975)	Johnny Hammond	Johnny Hammond	4:30
5.	"Whisper Zone" (from Routes, 1980)	Ramsey Lewis	Ramsey Lewis	2:57
6.	"What's Your Name" (from Inside Is Love, 1979)	Leon Ware	Leon Ware	3:57
7.	"Stay Free" (from Stay Free, 1979)	Nickolas Ashford; Valerie Simpson	Ashford & Simpson	4:51
8.	"Tonight's the Night (Good Time)" (from I Love to Dance, 1979)	Norman Durham	Kleeer	4:43
9.	"I'll Never Forget (My Favourite Disco)" (from Time Is Slipping Away, 1978)	Dexter Wansel	Dexter Wansel	4:18
10.	"Pretty Baby" (from Love Somebody Today, 1980)	Bernard Edwards; Nile Rodgers	Sister Sledge	3:55
11.	"California Dreamin'" (from Feliciano!, 1968)	John Phillips; Michelle Phillips	José Feliciano	4:08
12.	"Here's to You" (single, 1980)	Denise Dunning; Delores Dunning	Skyy	4:12
13.	"Life on Mars" (from Life on Mars, 1976)	Dexter Wansel	Dexter Wansel	5:25
14.	"Rainin' Through My Sunshine" (from Can You Feel The Force, 1978)	Eddie Amoo; Chris Amoo	The Real Thing	3:37
15.	"Enter The Dragon" (from the Enter the Dragon soundtrack, 1973)	Lalo Schifrin	Lalo Schifrin	2:19
16.	"Here, My Dear" (from Here, My Dear, 1978)	Marvin Gaye	Marvin Gaye	2:48
17.	"Music of the Earth" (from Patrice, 1978)	Angela Rushen; Patrice Rushen	Patrice Rushen	4:00
18.	"The White City Part 3" (story starting from Late Night Tales: Nightmares on Wax, 2003)	Patrick Neate	Brian Blessed	9:31
Total length:				1:17:40
