= Another Late Night: Tommy Guerrero =

Compilation album by Tommy Guerrero
- Released: 23 September 2002
- Genre: Funk, soul
- Label: Azuli
- Producer: Tommy Guerrero

Tommy Guerrero chronology
A Little Bit Of Somethin' (2000)	Another Late Night: Tommy Guerrero (2002)	Soul Food Taqueria (2003)

Another Late Night chronology
Groove Armada (2002)	Tommy Guerrero (2002)	Kid Loco (2003)

Professional ratings
Review scores
Source	Rating
Allmusic	4/5 stars

Another Late Night: Tommy Guerrero is a DJ mix album, mixed by musician and former professional skateboarder, Tommy Guerrero. It was released as part of the Late Night Tales / Another Late Night DJ series.

== Track listing ==
1. "Can't Get Up If You Can't Get Down" - US Navy Port Authority Soul Band
2. "Tomcat" - Muddy Waters
3. "Slippin' into Darkness" - Ramsey Lewis
4. "Taboo" - Santana
5. "Funky" - The Chambers Brothers
6. "Same Brown Earth" - Latin Playboys
7. "I'm Her Daddy" - Bill Withers
8. "Funkiest Man Alive" - Rufus Thomas
9. "Euphrates" - The Main Ingredient
10. "One More Time" - Cymande
11. "Web" - Hampton Hawes
12. "Viva Tirado" - El Chicano
13. "Is It Because I'm Black" - Syl Johnson
14. "Vitamin C" - Can
15. "Summer Song" - Ronnie Foster
16. "Come Together" - Tommy Guerrero
17. "Peepshow, Pts. 2 & 3" (read by Sir Patrick Moore, written by Nick Walker)
