= Last Night a DJ Saved My Life =

Last Night a DJ Saved My Life may refer to:

- "Last Night a D.J. Saved My Life", a 1982 single by Indeep
- Last Night a DJ Saved My Life (book), a 2000 book by Frank Broughton and Bill Brewster with an accompanying album
