= Late Night Tales: Nouvelle Vague =

Compilation album by Nouvelle Vague
- Released: 5 February 2007
- Length: 1:03:27
- Label: Azuli
- Producer: Nouvelle Vague

Nouvelle Vague chronology
Bande à part (2006)	Late Night Tales: Nouvelle Vague (2007)	Acoustic (2009)

Late Night Tales chronology
David Shrigley (2006)	Nouvelle Vague (2007)	Lindstrøm (2007)

Late Night Tales: Nouvelle Vague is the 17th DJ mix album released in the Late Night Tales series. It was mixed by French band Nouvelle Vague.

== Track listing ==
1. The Special AKA – "What I Like Most About You Is Your Girlfriend!" (Jerry Dammers), single from 1984
2. Nouvelle Vague – "Come On Eileen" (Kevin Rowland, Billy Adams, Jim Paterson)
3. Os Mutantes – "Baby" (Caetano Veloso) from Os Mutantes (1968)
4. Pale Fountains – "Unless" (Michael Head), single from 1984
5. Charlie Rich – "San Francisco Is a Lonely Town" (Ben Peters) from The Fabulous Charlie Rich, 1969
6. Tones on Tail – "Movement of Fear" (Daniel Ash, Glenn Campling) from EP Pop, 1984
7. Phoebe Killdeer – "Chaos" (Phoebe Killdeer), no other official release
8. Avril – "Urban Serenade" (Avril, Patrick Bouvet) from Members Only, 2004
9. Shirley Horn – "And I Love Him" (John Lennon/Paul McCartney) from Travelin' Light, 1965
10. Gavin Bryars – "The Vespertine Park" (Gavin Bryars), track excerpt from Hommages, 1981
11. David Sylvian – "A Fire in the Forest" (David Sylvian) from Blemish, 2003
12. Art Bears – "Civilization" (Fred Frith, Chris Cutler) from The World as It Is Today, 1981
13. Peggy Lee with Sy Oliver & His Orchestra – "You're My Thrill" (Jay Gorney, Sidney Clare) from Black Coffee, 1956
14. Glen Campbell – "By the Time I Get to Phoenix" (Jimmy Webb) from By the Time I Get to Phoenix, 1967
15. Isabelle Antena – "Le Poisson des Mers du Sud" (Isabelle Powaga, Sylvain Fasy), single from 1987 Hoping for Love
16. Anja Garbarek – "The Last Trick" (Anja Garbarek, Gisli Kristjansson), single from 2005 Briefly Shaking
17. Les Petroleuses (featuring Camille) – "Nicole" (Alex Pavlou, Marc Collin) from Les Petroleuses, 2002
18. Cibelle – "Phoenix" (Cibelle) from The Shine of Dried Electric Leaves, 2006
19. This Mortal Coil – "You and Your Sister" (Chris Bell) from Blood, 1991
20. Julie London – "Lonely Girl" (Bobby Troup) from Lonely Girl, 1956
21. David Shrigley – "What I Ate" (David Shrigley), first release
