= Late Night Tales: Ólafur Arnalds =

Compilation album by Ólafur Arnalds
- Released: 24 June 2016
- Label: Night Time Stories
- Compiler: Ólafur Arnalds

Ólafur Arnalds chronology
Trance Frendz - An evening with Ólafur Arnalds and Nils Frahm (2015)	Late Night Tales: Ólafur Arnalds (2016)	Island Songs (2016)

Late Night Tales chronology
Late Night Tales Presents Sasha: Scene Delete (2016)	Late Night Tales: Ólafur Arnalds (2016)	Late Night Tales: David Holmes (2016)

Professional ratings
Aggregate scores
Source	Rating
Metacritic	72/100
Review scores
Source	Rating
Allmusic	3/5 stars
Clash	8/10 stars

Late Night Tales: Ólafur Arnalds is a mix album compiled by Icelandic producer Ólafur Arnalds, released on 24 June 2016.

It is a part of the Late Night Tales series of albums released by Night Time Stories.

== Track listing ==
No.	Artist(s)	Title	Length
1	Hjálmar Lárusson and Jónbjörn Gíslason	Jómsvíkingarímur - ýta feldi eigi rór	01:12
2	Julianna Barwick	Forever	05:29
3	Koreless	Last Remnants	04:20
4	Odesza	How Did I Get Here (Instrumental)	02:10
5	Anois	A Noise	04:05
6	Samaris	Góða Tungl	04:10
7	Ólafur Arnalds	RGB	04:38
8	Rival Consoles	Pre	05:14
9	Four Tet	Lion (Jamie xx Remix)	07:08
10	Jai Paul	Jasmine (Demo)	04:13
11	James Blake	Our Love Comes Back	03:39
12	Spooky Black	Pull	04:13
13	Ólafur Arnalds feat. Arnór Dan	Say My Name (Exclusive Destiny's Child Cover)	05:41
14	Sarah Neufeld & Colin Stetson	And still they move	02:57
15	Kiasmos	Orgoned	06:00
16	Ólafur Arnalds	Kinesthesia I	01:46
17	Hjaltalín	Ethereal	06:39
18	David Tennant	Undone (Exclusive Spoken Word)	03:52
