= Pastel Ghost =

American singer-songwriter and producer

- Born: Vivian Moon; Brooklyn, New York, U.S.
- Genres: Dreamwave, synth pop, dream pop, electronica
- Occupations: Musician, singer, songwriter, producer
- Labels: Self-released (Dark Beach EP and Shadows EP); 80s Ladies Records (Abyss LP, 2015); Cleopatra Records (Ethereality LP, 2018)
- Website: pastelghost.com

Vivian Moon, professionally known as Pastel Ghost, is an American musician, singer, songwriter, and producer. Originally from Brooklyn, New York City, she then spent time in the San Francisco Bay Area, specifically San Francisco and Oakland, before moving to her current home in Austin, Texas.

She has described her music as "dreamwave" and "dream rave". Others, such as professional music critics, music industry workers, and concert promoters, have variously described her music as "lac[ing] elements of dream pop, post-punk and electronica with her ethereal vocals melting over chilly synths and thumping dance beats," "whispery, gauzy, shimmering and intimate dance sound," "witch rave", "strikingly hypnotic", and "electronic beats on pillowy clouds of synths, occasionally fused with 8-bit-video-game-influenced sounds" with "reverb-soaked vocals, lending the whole affair an appropriately ghostly vibe."

She first self-released two EPs, Dark Beach EP and Shadows EP. She then signed to 80s Ladies Records for her debut full-length album, Abyss, which was released on March 10, 2015. Her second studio album, Ethereality, was released on October 5, 2018, via Cleopatra Records. She supported Mr.Kitty on the subsequent tour, in 2019.

As of April 12, 2025, Pastel Ghost had more than 3.4 (or now 3 186 412) million monthly listeners on Spotify, and, notably, her top track, "Dark Beach" (from the album Abyss), had over 288 million streams.

== Biography ==
Moon grew up in what she has described as a musical family, with a sister who played both classical piano and bass and a brother who also played the piano. Moon herself grew up playing guitar and piano. In high school and college, she played with multiple bands, though she rarely took center stage and had no particular aspirations of being a front woman. She is of Korean descent.

== Discography ==
Studio albums

- Abyss (2015)
- Ethereality (2018)

Extended plays

- Dark Beach (2013)
- Shadows (2014)
