= Late Night Tales presents Automatic Soul =

Compilation album by Tom Findlay
- Released: 3 November 2014
- Genre: Soul, pop, contemporary R&B, post-disco
- Label: Night Time Stories
- Producer: Tom Findlay
- Compiler: Tom Findlay

Late Night Tales chronology
Late Night Tales: Franz Ferdinand (2014)	Late Night Tales presents Automatic Soul (2014)	Late Night Tales: Jon Hopkins (2015)

Late Night Tales presents Automatic Soul is a mix album compiled by Tom Findlay of English electronic music duo Groove Armada, released 3 November 2014 as part of the Late Night Tales series.

The mix features tracks from artists such as Mtume, Zapp, Donna Allen, The Gap Band, Alexander O'Neal and Thelma Houston. As Sugardaddy, Findlay and Tim Hutton recorded an exclusive cover version of Dennis Edwards’ "Don't Look Any Further" for the release.

== Track listing ==
No.	Title	Artist(s)	Length
1.	"Juicy Fruit"	Mtume
2.	"Don't Look Any Further (Exclusive Cover Version)"	Sugardaddy feat. Ronika
3.	"Fool's Paradise"	Meli'sa Morgan
4.	"Don't Stop the Music"	Bits N Pieces
5.	"Heartbreaker (part I, part II)"	Zapp
6.	"Rumors"	Timex Social Club
7.	"You Know I Love You"	George Franklin Smallwood & Marshmellow Band
8.	"I'll Be A Freak For You"	Royalle Delite
9.	"I'll Be Good"	René & Angela
10.	"Serious"	Donna Allen
11.	"Change Of Heart"	Change
12.	"You Are In My System"	The System
13.	"I Owe It To Myself"	The Gap Band
14.	"What's Missing"	Alexander O'Neal
15.	"You Used To Hold Me So Tight"	Thelma Houston
16.	"You're My Last Chance"	52nd Street
17.	"You And Me Tonight"	Aurra
18.	"I Can Feel Your Love Slippin Away"	Samson & Delilah
19.	"Touch Me"	Fonda Rae
20.	"I Specialize"	Sharon Brown
