= Late Night Tales: David Holmes =

Compilation album by David Holmes
- Released: October 21, 2016
- Genre: Electronic music
- Length: 71:44
- Label: Night Time Stories
- Producer: David Holmes

David Holmes chronology
Mindhorn (2016)	Late Night Tales: David Holmes (2016)	Logan Lucky (2017)

Late Night Tales chronology
Late Night Tales: Ólafur Arnalds (2016)	Late Night Tales: David Holmes (2013)	Late Night Tales: BadBadNotGood (2017)

Professional ratings
Aggregate scores
Source	Rating
Metacritic	99/100
Review scores
Source	Rating
The Irish Times	4/5 stars
Drowned in Sound	8/10
Louder Than War	8.5/10
Mixmag	7/10
Q	5/5 stars
Record Collector	5/5 stars

Late Night Tales: David Holmes is a DJ mix album curated and performed by David Holmes for Late Night Tales series, released by Night Time Stories on 21 October 2016. It features artists such as Children of Sunshine, Buddy Holly, Neo Maya, Geese, and Jon Hopkins, among many others.

The album was highly praised by critics, getting a rating of 99/100 (universal acclaim) by Metacritic. The Irish Times' Jim Carrol wrote, "Holmes does not disappoint, creating powerfully evocative, engaging and moving sound essays on life, loss, mortality, brotherhood and memory. [...] Holmes’ selections for the small hours are full of heft, melancholy and deeply felt connections." Brian Coney of The Quietus wrote, “Few individuals fit the mould for a much-loved, artist-curated compilation series quite as comfortably as David Holmes. [...] In taking our hand but never gripping too tight, Holmes taps into something that even the best Late Night Tales compilations sometimes neglect: the pure self-therapy of total escapism." Ransom Note author Joe Roberts wrote, "If there is such thing as a soul, then Holmes has poured his own into this."

== Track listing ==
No.	Title	Writer(s)	Performer(s)	Length
1.	"Great Father Spirit in the Sky"	Barry Woolnough	David Holmes & Barry Woolnough	4:33
2.	"The Reiki Healer from County Down"	David Holmes & Steve Jones	David Holmes & Steve Jones	3:42
3.	"It’s a Long Way to Heaven"	The Children of Sunshine	David Holmes & The Children of Sunshine	1:59
4.	"Slythtovery"	Hugo Nicolson	David Holmes & Spark Sparkle	2:42
5.	"Talking Judgement Blues"	Alain Maclean	David Holmes & Alain Maclean	2:43
6.	"Orleans"	David Crosby	David Holmes & David Crosby	1:42
7.	"Love Is Strange"	Mickey & Sylvia & Ethel “Cookie” Smith	David Holmes & Buddy Holly	3:00
8.	"Paradise of Replica"	Haco	David Holmes & After Dinner	2:44
9.	"Ru Ru (Sleep Little Baby)"	Leo Abrahams & Sophia Brous & David Coulter	David Holmes & Lullaby Movements	3:52
10.	"It’s on Every one of Us"	David Pomeranz	David Holmes & Jeff Bridges & Keefus Ciancia	6:14
11.	"I'm Not in Love"	10cc	David Holmes & Song Sung	6:24
12.	"I Won’t Hurt You"	Shaun Harris & Michael Lloyd & Robert Markley	David Holmes & Neo Maya	2:32
13.	"Henry McCullough"	David Holmes & BP Fallon	David Holmes & BP Fallon	5:34
14.	"Love as a Ghost"	Documenta	David Holmes & Documenta	4:41
15.	"Stereo Music for Acoustic Guitar, Buchla Music Box 100, Hewlett Packard Model 236 Oscillator, Electric Guitar And Computer, Pt. 1"	Keith Fullerton Whitman	David Holmes & Keith Fullerton Whitman	2:38
16.	"Into Forever"	Nell Rudd	Eat Lights Become Lights	5:02
17.	"Andrew Parsnip"	Vince Sipprell & Emma Smith	David Holmes & Geese	4:08
18.	"Gloomy Sunday"	Diane Campbell	David Holmes & Die Hexen	2:53
19.	"Elsewhere Anchises"	David Holmes & Jon Hopkins	David Holmes & Jon Hopkins	4:50
