= Late Night Tales: BadBadNotGood =

Compilation album by BadBadNotGood
- Released: July 28, 2017
- Length: 1:06:06
- Label: Night Time Stories

BadBadNotGood chronology
IV (2016)	Late Night Tales: BadBadNotGood (2017)

Late Night Tales: BadBadNotGood chronology
Late Night Tales: David Holmes (2016)	Late Night Tales: BadBadNotGood (2017)	Late Night Tales: Agnes Obel (2018)

Professional ratings
Aggregate scores
Source	Rating
Metacritic	85/100
Review scores
Source	Rating
Clash	9/10
Exclaim!	8/10
Pitchfork	7.6/10

Late Night Tales: BadBadNotGood is a mix album compiled by Canadian band BadBadNotGood. It was released on July 28, 2017, as part of the Late Night Tales series.

The mix features music from Stereolab, Erasmo Carlos, Donnie and Joe Emerson, and Thundercat.

== Critical reception ==
Late Night Tales: BadBadNotGood received "universal acclaim" reviews from contemporary music critics. At Metacritic, which assigns a normalized rating out of 100 to reviews from mainstream critics, the album received an average score of 85, based on 6 reviews.

== Track listing ==
No.	Title	Writer(s)	Original artist	Length
1.	"Olson"	Marcus Eoin, Michael Sandison	Boards of Canada	1:49
2.	"Vida Antiga"	Erasmo Carlos, Roberto Carlos	Erasmo Carlos	3:01
3.	"Don't Let Your Love Fade Away"	Ellis Taylor	Gene Williams	2:41
4.	"People Make the World Go Round"	Thom Bell, Linda Creed	Chosen Few	3:06
5.	"Home Is Where the Hatred Is"	Gil Scott-Heron	Esther Phillips	3:14
6.	"Oh Honey"	Michael Denne, Ken Gold	Delegation	3:57
7.	"Käes on Aeg"	Eugene McDaniels	Velly Joonas	2:44
8.	"The Flower Called Nowhere"	Tim Gane, Laetitia Sadier	Stereolab	3:13
9.	"Disco Dancer"	Gyan Kwaako, Kofi Kwaako	Kiki Gyan	3:52
10.	"Anchi Bale Game"	Admas Band	Admas Band	3:15
11.	"Sanza Nocturne"	Francis Bebey	Francis Bebey	2:46
12.	"For Love I Come"	George Duke	Thundercat	3:27
13.	"West"	Adam Feeney, Ashton Simmons, River Tiber	River Tiber	2:31
14.	"Work"	Charlotte Day Wilson	Charlotte Day Wilson	3:38
15.	"Don't Talk (Put Your Head on My Shoulder)"	Tony Asher, Brian Wilson	The Beach Boys	2:48
16.	"Baby"	Donnie Emerson	Donnie and Joe Emerson	3:54
17.	"Lido"	Bernard Lubat	Les Prospections	2:53
18.	"And I Love Her"	John Lennon, Paul McCartney	Grady Tate	4:41
19.	"To You"	Andy Shauf		2:22
20.	"The Meaning of Love"		Steve Kuhn	3:34
21.	"You, Me and Jim Beam"		Lydia Lunch	4:40

== Charts ==
Chart (2017)	Peak position
Dutch Albums (Album Top 100)	20
