= Mr.Kitty =

American singer-songwriter, record producer, & DJ (born 1992)

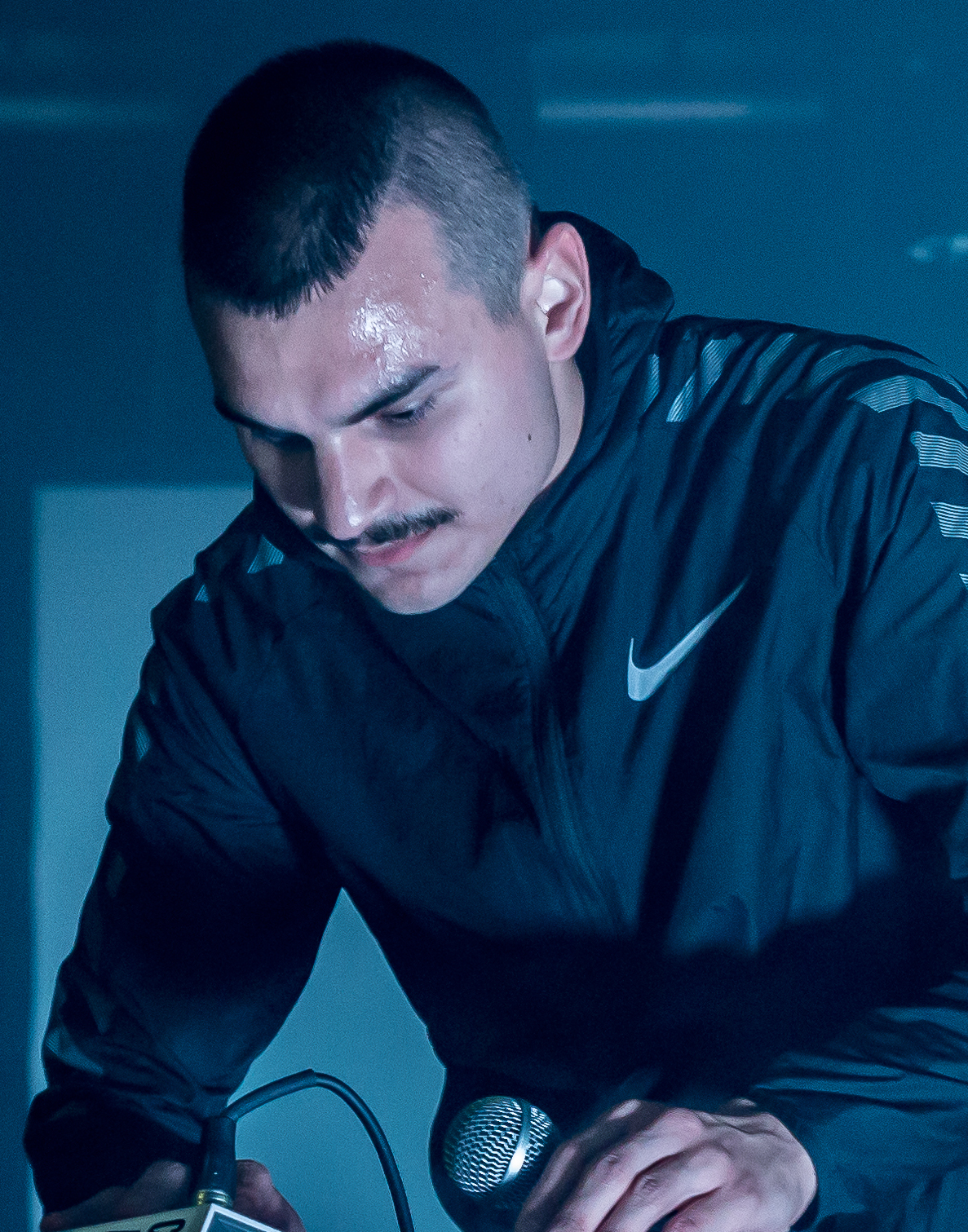
- Carney in 2017

Background information
- Also known as: Mr.Kitty, Echo Strobes, MEEMU, Girlboy
- Born: Forrest Avery Carney; March 25, 1992 (age 34); Arlington, Texas, U.S.
- Genres: Synthwave; synthpop; new wave; witch house; dark wave
- Occupations: Singer-songwriter; record producer; DJ
- Years active: 2005–present
- Labels: Keep It Dark Records - his own (Modern Romance, Eternity) Invisibles - Alex Zelenka's one (Uncarresed EP) Aural Sects (Emotional/Physical) Engraved Ritual (Life) Juggernaut Services (Life Deluxe, Time) Moon Sounds Records (Insects EP) Negative Gain Productions (Time North American Edition, Fragments, A.I., Ephemeral) Positive Loss Recordings (Unreal)
- Formerly of: Sweetdiculous, beatMARIO*

Forrest Avery LeMaire (né Carney; born March 25, 1992), known professionally as Mr.Kitty, is an American singer-songwriter, record producer, and DJ. He is best known for his song "After Dark", which was released in 2014 and went viral after a fan video was published on YouTube in 2019.

== Career ==
In 2008, he began releasing "RMX," the first in a series of mini-albums featuring remixes by various artists. The following year, he released "RMX II," and in 2010, he released his first standalone LP, "Until Death Do Us Part." This album included a first version of "Everything Will Be Okay," a song that would later be remixed and edited. In the same year, he released "RMX III" and in 2011, "RMX IV" and "D E Δ T H," his second studio album, which featured the songs "††" and "Resurrection." This was the first album to feature a cat's face on the cover, an element that would be repeated on his next two studio albums. In 2012, Mr.Kitty released three albums: "RMX V," "RMX VI" (the final album of the "RMX" saga), and "Eternity." "Eternity" was his third studio album, and his first under a record label (Keep It Dark Records). It featured the song "Destroy Me."

In 2012 he began to incorporate remixes of his past music into his studio albums. In 2013, Life, his fourth studio album, was released under the Engraved Ritual label, featuring the song "Insects". In 2014, he achieved underground success with Time, his fifth studio album released and owned by the Juggernaut Music Group label, and most notably with the songs "After Dark" and "XIII". In 2015, Fragments, his sixth studio album, was released under the Negative Gain Productions label. The following year he appeared as the remixer of North Star for the IAMX and LAX (Mr.Kitty Remix) album Everything Is Burning (Metanoia Addendum) for Aesthetic Perfection and also released a four-song mini-album compilation featuring a remix of "Everything Will Be Okay". In 2017, Mr.Kitty released AI, his seventh studio album, under the Negative Gain Productions label.

Throughout 2018, Mr.Kitty focused on various collaborations, and in 2019, released the album Ephemeral, his eighth studio album, independently. His album Ephemeral was inspired by the death of a friend who committed suicide in 2018.

In 2022, "After Dark" gained viral popularity on video sharing platforms YouTube and TikTok, being paired as background music with various videos.

In 2024, Mr.Kitty released the album "Unreal," featuring 40 songs, with "No Longer Human" and "Perpetual" as its highlights.

In the same year, Mr.Kitty released "C-THRU (Club Mix)" featuring singer CULTTASTIC.

After a six-year hiatus, he made a comeback in 2025 by performing two live shows. The first show was held at the White Oak Music Hall in Houston, Texas, while the second one took place at the Teragram Ballroom in Los Angeles, California.

== Musical style ==
His music style is described as a blend of synthwave, synthpop, new wave, witch house, and dark wave genres, and has been said to evoke a sense of nostalgia in listeners.

== Personal life ==
In a 2019 interview, LeMaire stated that he produces music in his apartment, on a computer he has used since he was 18.

== Controversy ==
In June 2021, it was revealed on The Austin Chronicle that in 2019, Mr.Kitty sent a 15-year-old fan nude photos, sexual videos and intimate messages via direct messages on a social media platform over a period of over four months. On June 26, 2021, Mr.Kitty released a statement via Twitter, Instagram and Facebook, admitting to having had an online relationship with an underage fan and apologizing to the fan and his current partner. His label, Negative Gain Productions, released a statement later on detailing that they would discontinue all sales of his albums. Mr. Kitty still maintains all streaming rights from Negative Gain productions.

== Discography ==
=== Studio albums ===
- Until Death Do Us Part (2010)
- D E Δ T H (2011)
- Eternity (2012)
- Life (2013)
- Time (2014)
- Fragments (2015)
- A.I. (2017)
- Ephemeral (2019)
- Unreal (2024)
- Finale (2026)

=== Extended plays and singles ===
- Survive (2008)
- Forever Nintendo with Eric Chiptune (2008)
- Scars EP with Tyler Tripp (2010)
- Emotional / Physical (2012)
- My Favorite Ghost (2012)
- Covers (2012)
- Uncarresed (2012)
- Insects (2014)
- XIII (2014)
- Entwine (2015)
- No Prisoners with Corroded Master (2015)
- I Hope You Fall Apart (2016)
- Empty Phases (2019)
- Not Dead Yet (2019)
- Bubble (Mr.Kitty Remix) with Danny Blu (2020)
- La Nuit sexuelle (Mr.Kitty Remix) (2021)
- The Stranglings (Mr.Kitty Remix) (2021)
- The House of the Dead with NADA5150 (2021)
- 6x6 (2023)
- Torment (2023)
- Glycerin (2023)
- Spin (2023)
- Angels (feat. MEIKO) (2024)
- Remind (2024)
- C-THRU (Club Mix) (2024)
- In The Night (2025)
- Can’t Stand U (2026)
- Pathétique (2026)
- Diamond Path Of Eternity (2026)
- Flavorless Candy (2026)
- Stadium (2026)
- Fog (2026)

=== Other charted songs ===
List of other charted songs, with selected chart positions, showing year released and album name
Title	Year	Peak chart positions	Certifications	Album
Title	Year	WW	Certifications	Album
"After Dark"	2014	195	BPI: Silver	Time

=== Remix albums ===
- R.M.X (2008)
- R.M.X II (2009)
- R.M.X III (2010)
- R.M.X IV (2011)
- R.M.X V (2012)
- R.M.X VI (2012)

=== Compilations ===
- Mr.Kitty (Includes all of his collected works up to 2013 - going back to 2005) (2013)
- 2014 SXSW Sampler (2014)
- Mr.Kitty (2015)
- -+ (2016, rereleased in 2020 with additional tracks)

=== DJ mixes ===
- Ultra Cute Death (2014)

=== Guest appearances ===
- Louisianna Purchase, Whip Crack (feat. Mr.Kitty) (2020)
- Sasha Trice, Sorento (feat. Mr.Kitty) (2023)
- Sasha Trice, Sleeper (feat. Mr.Kitty) (2025)

=== Music videos ===
- "Destroy Me" (2012)
- "Detach" (2013)
- "Insects" (2014)
- "In Your Blood" (2015)
- "Fragments" (2016)
- "Habits" (featuring Pastel Ghost) (2017)
- "Not Dead Yet" (2019)
- "Can't Stand U" (2026)
