= Late Night Tales: Friendly Fires =

Compilation album by Friendly Fires
- Released: 5 November 2012
- Genres: Electronic, pop
- Length: 1:13:51
- Label: Night Time Stories
- Producers: Ed MacFarlane, Edd Gibson, Jack Savidge
- Compilers: Ed MacFarlane, Edd Gibson, Jack Savidge

Friendly Fires chronology
Pala (2011)	Late Night Tales: Friendly Fires (2012)

Late Night Tales chronology
Late Night Tales: Metronomy (2011)	Late Night Tales: Friendly Fires (2012)	Late Night Tales Presents After Dark (2013)

Late Night Tales: Friendly Fires is a mix album compiled by Friendly Fires, released on 5 November 2012. It is the thirtieth album in the Late Night Tales series.

"...the perfect prescription of head, heart and footwork that defines ideal participants for constructing Late Night Tales"

Their compilation features tracks from artists such as SBTRKT, Bibio, Cocteau Twins, Laurel Halo and Stereolab. It also features an exclusive Friendly Fires' cover of Eberhard Schoener + Sting's song "Why Don't You Answer?" off the 1978 album Flashback.

== History ==
In November 2012, a music video was released for Friendly Fires' cover "Why Don't You Answer?", directed by Fred Rowson for Colonel Blimp. It was premiered on The Guardian's new music blog.

== Track listing ==
No.	Title	Artist(s)	Length
1.	"Under the Sun"	Junior Boys	3:18
2.	"Change Your Style"	Renée	2:37
3.	"Love Vibration"	Joe Simon	4:53
4.	"Like an Eagle"	Dennis Parker	4:04
5.	"Carry On, Turn Me On"	Space	3:52
6.	"Attention Seeker"	Iron Galaxy	6:36
7.	"Don't Summarise My Summer Eyes"	Bibio	4:00
8.	"The Black Arts"	Stereolab	4:53
9.	"Hold On" (featuring Sampha)	SBTRKT	2:55
10.	"Why Don't You Answer" (Eberhard Schoener and Sting cover)	Friendly Fires	2:28
11.	"One Most Memorable"	Sonna	1:14
12.	"Embassy"	Laurel Halo	3:59
13.	"House Music Is a Controllable Desire You Can Own"	DJ Sprinkles	3:59
14.	"Invisible"	Grouper	2:46
15.	"Endless Shore"	Melody's Echo Chamber	3:31
16.	"Cherry-Coloured Funk"	Cocteau Twins	3:15
17.	"Shine"	Slowdive	5:03
18.	"Love Song"	Olivia Newton-John	3:39
19.	"Over There, It's Raining"	Nils Frahm	2:42
20.	"Flat of Angles (Part 1)"	Benedict Cumberbatch	6:24
