= Barnaby Bye =

American rock band

- Origin: United States
- Genres: Rock
- Years active: 1973–present
- Labels: Dreamscape Records, Atlantic Records
- Members: Billy Alessi, Bobby Alessi, Peppy Castro and Mike Ricciardella
- Past members: Peppy Castro; Billy Alessi; Bobby Alessi; Mike Ricciardella
- Website: www.barnabybye.com/

Barnaby Bye was an American band formed in 1973. Peppy Castro, ex-Blues Magoos, formed Barnaby Bye with Long Island musicians the Alessi Brothers, Billy and Bobby, and Mike Ricciardella of The Illusion. They recorded for Ahmet Ertegun's Atlantic Records, and Ertegun personally produced their first LP.

== Discography ==
=== Albums ===
- 1973: Room to Grow
- 1974: Touch
- 2008: Thrice Upon a Time

=== Singles ===
- 1973: "I Think I'm Gonna Like It" (P. Castro, K. Stuart Jr., B-side "Dreamer")
- 1975: "Blonde" (B. Alessi, M. Tilyou, B-side "Take Me with You")

Some of the recordings have been reissued by Wounded Bird Records.
