= Late Night Tales: Metronomy =

Compilation album by Joseph Mount
- Released: 3 September 2012
- Genre: Electronic, pop
- Length: 1:13:51
- Label: Night Time Stories
- Producer: Joseph Mount
- Compiler: Joseph Mount

Joseph Mount chronology
The English Riviera (2011)	Late Night Tales: Metronomy (2012)

Late Night Tales chronology
Late Night Tales: Music For Pleasure (2012)	Late Night Tales: Metronomy (2012)	Late Night Tales: Friendly Fires (2012)

Late Night Tales: Metronomy is a mix album compiled by Joseph Mount of English band Metronomy, released on 3 September 2012 as part of the Late Night Tales series.

The mix features tracks from artists such as OutKast, Autechre, The Alan Parsons Project, Chick Corea and Cat Power. Paul Morley contributes the spoken word piece, "Lost for Words Pt.4".

Metronomy also recorded an exclusive cover version of Jean Michel Jarre’s ‘Hypnose’.

Mick Karn's track "Weather The Windmill", included in the compilation, would later be sampled heavily in Metronomy's track "Mick Slow" on their 2016 album Summer 08.

== Track listing ==
ALNCD29

No.	Title	Artist(s)	Length
1.	"Prototype"	Outkast	4:50
2.	"Drunk"	Tweet	3:29
3.	"Cosmic Ball"	SA-RA Creative Partners	2:46
4.	"El Bozo" (Part 1)	Chick Corea	2:23
5.	"Blue Flowers"	Dr. Octagon	2:45
6.	"Cache Vocal"	Lonzo & The World Class Wreckin Cru	3:08
7.	"Hypnose" (Exclusive Jean Michel Jarre Cover Version)	Metronomy	3:57
8.	"Seabird"	Alessi Brothers	3:08
9.	"Fold4, Wrap5"	Autechre	3:57
10.	"Weather the Windmill"	Mick Karn	2:45
11.	"Eye In the Sky"	The Alan Parsons Project	3:21
12.	"Love Caboose"	Geneva Jacuzzi	2:40
13.	"You Are..."	The Two Lone Swordsmen	3:42
14.	"Cybernaut"	Tonto's Expanding Head Band	4:16
15.	"Forever"	Pete Drake	2:25
16.	"The Day (We Fell In Love)"	Appaloosa	3:46
17.	"Complainte pour Ste Catherine"	Kate & Anna McGarrigle	2:32
18.	"Winners Lose"	Herman Dune	4:44
19.	"Werewolf"	Cat Power	5:59
20.	"Lost for Words Pt.4" (Exclusive Spoken Word Piece)	Paul Morley	10:09
Total length:			1:13:51
