= Ronika =

English singer-songwriter, producer and DJ

- Born: Veronica Clare Sampson; Nottingham, Nottinghamshire, England
- Genres: Synthpop; electro-funk; nu-disco
- Occupations: Singer-songwriter; producer; DJ
- Years active: 2010–present
- Label: RecordShop
- Website: realronika.com

Ronika (born Veronica Clare Sampson) is an English singer-songwriter, producer and DJ. Born in Nottingham but currently living in London, she writes, sings and produces her own music.

== Life and career ==
=== Early life and career beginnings ===
Ronika started going to clubs and all-nighter's in Nottingham and Brixton as a young teenager and immersed herself in dance music and club culture. She began experimenting with producing music at home, visiting a local studio at weekends to learn more about recording, and immersed herself in soul, disco, funk, electro, house, techno and hip hop. Eventually, she began DJing at local clubs and house parties. Before releasing her own music Ronika worked as a live sound engineer in a live music venue in Nottingham, as well as working producing grime and hip-hop with young people who had been expelled from school.

Ronika's formative influences included Michael and Janet Jackson, Madonna, The Cure, Depeche Mode, OMD, Metro Area, A Guy Called Gerald, and Chicago house music.

=== 2010–12: Extended plays ===
Between 2010 and 2012 Ronika released four extended plays on her own record label, RecordShop: Do or Die/Paper Scissors Stone EP on 26 April 2010, Forget Yourself/Wiyoo EP on 13 June 2011 and Only Only/In the City on 3 October 2011 and Automatic on 9 April 2012. She was featured as The Guardian's "New Band of the Day" on 18 February 2010, with critic Paul Lester describing her as "A writer-producer as well as a singer, you could imagine her penning hits for Kylie or becoming the female Stuart Price", while referring to her music as late-period disco, electro-funk and synthpop. The Sunday Times gave Ronika's Forget Yourself/Wiyoo EP a positive review, writing that she "rises above mere note-perfect pastiche: her handling of the source material is so adept, and the results are so fab and imbued with such understanding and affection, that the fact the EP is more reverent than revelatory matters not a jot." "Automatic" was praised by the NME who called it "pop music for credible pop fans, from the right '80s references (Tom Tom Club, Prince) to the patina of DIY grain in the bit-crunched laptop production," while Popjustice called it "an infectious, handclap-happy deep-groove 'jam'".

In October 2011 Ronika played at New York's Webster Hall as part of CMJ and in November 2011 attended the prestigious Red Bull Music Academy in Madrid where she also supported Peaches and Tensnake at the closing party.

Ronika supported Little Boots' gig at London's XOYO on 4 May 2012 and also remixed her Headphones single. She collaborated with British DJ Hervé on the song "How Can I Live Without You (Make It Right)", which premiered on Annie Mac's BBC Radio 1 show on 4 May 2012, and was released digitally on 15 July 2012. She also collaborated with Dutch disco producer Shook on the single "Distorted Love" which was released 31 May 2012.

=== 2013–2014: Selectadisc ===
On 22 April 2013, Ronika released an EP titled Rough n Soothe. In a review of the title track, Pitchfork Media stated that Ronika "creates an alluring work that is equal parts charming and cheeky." Her official debut album, Selectadisc, was released on 2 June 2014 to digital music retailers on RecordShop, and on 20 June on 12" vinyl in a limited run of 500 copies. Named after a Nottingham independent record store that closed down in 2009, the album was preceded by the track "Shell Shocked", which was made available on 12 March 2014 upon pre-ordering the album. Ronika produced much of the album herself as well as collaborating and co-producing tracks with Nottingham producers Joe Buhdha and Citizen.

Upon its release, Selectadisc was met with rave reviews from music critics. The Guardian highlighted the album's "groove-laden basslines and deep soul vocals" and dubbed it "one of the year's sprightliest releases", while The Observer opined that the album's "bold, ecstatic songs draw on [...] synthetic 80s dance music [...] But don't call it a throwback: this is a thoroughly contemporary singer aiming with confidence at the charts and the clubs." Mojo lauded the album as a "masterfully assured collection of joyful pop songs", and Mixmag wrote that "Ronika has cherry-picked key influences to create one of 2014's most assured and fun-filled debut albums." Notion magazine wrote "Absolutely brilliant and dripping with the sort of talent that should see Selectadisc become one of the cult pop albums of the 2010s."

In November/December 2014 Ronika supported British synthpop pioneers The Human League on their UK tour which included a date at London's Hammersmith Apollo. She followed up Selectadisc with a new EP Marathon released Dec 2014 which was reviewed by Matthew Horton of the NME stating "Something's very wrong in the state of pop if Ronika's failing to notch up the chart hits. It's high time more people checked Ronika out."

Late in 2014, Ronika appeared on the Tom Findlay-curated Late Night Tales compilation Automatic Soul, covering the Dennis Edwards' track Don't Look Any Further as Sugardaddy featuring Ronika. She also featured on Mighty Mouse's single See Through You which was released on 1 Dec 2014 and described as an "addictive dancefloor ditty" by the Line of Best Fit.

=== 2015–present: Lose My Cool ===
In 2015, Ronika participated in the inaugural Stockholm Songwriting Camp. The camp was kicked off by Benny Andersson and Björn Ulvaeus of ABBA.

On 20 January 2017, Ronika released her second album, Lose My Cool and the album received positive reviews from critics - Mixmag gave the album 8/10, saying "Infectious and groove-laden, Lose My Cool manages to be both forward-thinking and vintage at the same time." Q Magazine gave the album 4/5 - "A fiercely well-assembled soundtrack that blends '80s pop and club classics with more recent R&B innovations."

Mojo magazine gave the album 4/5 - "The DIY disco maverick channels vintage R&B and thrilling dancefloor pop of an '80s Madonna/Janet/TLC stripe, in a voice that's crystal cool in up and downtempo settings" and The Guardian gave it three stars, saying "this follow-up remains upbeat, with explorations into 90s R&B and hip-hop" and "the Nottingham singer remains an effervescent pop presence".

Ronika produced much of the album herself and described it as "Jams and grooves inspired by timeless and future classics united by pop devotion."

Singles 'Principle' and 'Dissolve' also featured on Spotify's New Music Friday playlist.

In February 2018, the Lindstrøm/Ronika collaboration Didn't Know Better, first teased in 2016, was finally released digitally and on 12" vinyl. It was playlisted on the A-list at Rinse FM.

== Discography ==
Studio albums

- Selectadisc (2014)
- Lose My Cool (2017)

Extended plays

- Do or Die/Paper Scissors Stone EP (2010)
- Forget Yourself/Wiyoo EP (2011)
- Only Only/In the City (2011)
- Automatic (2012)
- Rough n Soothe (2013)
- Marathon (2014)

Singles

- "Principle" (2016)
