= Late Night Tales Presents After Dark: Nocturne =

Compilation album by Bill Brewster
- Released: May 11, 2015
- Genre: Funk; soul; nu-disco; pop rock
- Length: 72:20
- Label: Night Time Stories
- Producer: Bill Brewster

Late Night Tales chronology
Late Night Tales: Jon Hopkins (2015)	Late Night Tales presents After Dark: Nocturne (2015)	Late Night Tales: Nils Frahm (2015)

Professional ratings
Review scores
Source	Rating
Mixmag	8/10
Numb Magazine	8/10

Late Night Present After Dark: Nocturne is a DJ mix album by Bill Brewster for Late Night Tales which is the third from the After Dark spinoff series, released by Night Time Stories on 11 May 2015. Nocturne focuses on obscure and low-tempo electronic music and features artists such as Paladin, Adriano Celentano, Charli XCX (with a remix from Lindstrøm), and Brewster’s own project, Hotel Motel.

Balance wrote that "Brewster’s sense of eclecticism is a mastery that few other DJs possess. From his first DJing days in the 80s at warehouse parties in Harlem and the East Village, his inclination for disco and distinct New York roots still manages to shine through his sets and is most definitely the case for “Nocturne."

== Track listing ==
1. "In Rhythm" - Scream and Dance
2. "Stop Ou encore" (Disconet Remix) - Plastic Bertrand
3. "Third World" - Paladin
4. "L’Uniqa Chance" - Adriano Celentano
5. "Chocolate City" - Hotel Motel
6. "The Fall" - Hotel Motel
7. "Celebre" - Harry Wolfman
8. "Chained To the Train of Love" - Coal Kitchen
9. "In Deep" - Matt Dirt
10. "Organic Ceramic" - Hugh Mane
11. "You (Ha Ha Ha)" (Lindstrøm Remix) - Charli XCX
12. "Solenoid" - Rodion
13. "Insects Overlord" - Tornado Wallace
14. "Breezin'" - Emperor Machine
15. "Miss Fortune" (Chuggy Edit) - Pink + Black / Pink and Black
16. "Acid Cake" - Trulz & Robin
17. "Funky Voodoo" (Mang Dynasty Edit) - Spaghetti Head
18. "Galaxy" - Alex Metric & Oliver
19. "Back To The Streets" - Rudy Norman

== See also ==
- Late Night Tales Presents After Dark
- Late Night Tales Presents After Dark: Nightshift
