= Late Night Tales: Nils Frahm =

Compilation album by Nils Frahm
- Released: 11 September 2015
- Label: Night Time Stories
- Compiler: Nils Frahm

Nils Frahm chronology
-solo- (2015)	Late Night Tales: Nils Frahm (2015)

Late Night Tales chronology
Late Night Tales Presents After Dark: Nocturne (2015)	Late Night Tales: Nils Frahm (2015)	Late Night Tales Presents Sasha: Scene Delete (2016)

Late Night Tales: Nils Frahm is a mix album compiled by German composer Nils Frahm, released on 11 September 2015.

It is a part of the Late Night Tales series of albums released by Night Time Stories.

== Track listing ==
No.	Title	Artist(s)	Length
1	"4:33" (Exclusive John Cage Cover Version)	Nils Frahm	3:43
2	"Liquindi 2"	Baka Forest People of Southeast Cameroon	3:02
3	Divertimento Für Tenorsaxaphon Und Kleines Ensemble Part 4	Carl Oesterhelt, Johannes Enders	2:41
4	0181 (excerpt)	Four Tet	0:48
5	You're The Only Star (Nils Frahm's '78' recording)	Gene Autry, Nils Frahm	1:54
6	In A Beautiful Place Out In The Country	Boards of Canada	2:44
7	It Was Willow	Bibio	1:18
8	Peaks	Dictaphone	3:10
9	Flight of The Bumblebee	Vladimir Horowitz	1:06
10	Concierto de Aranjuez	Miles Davis	3:49
11	It's The Talk of The Town (Nils Frahm's '78' Recording)	Victor Silvester and His Ballroom orchestra, Nils Frahm	1:14
12	SK20	System	2:38
13	Mango Drive	Rhythm & Sound	3:41
14	Generique	Miles Davis	2:58
15	O Herr Bleibet Meine Freude, BWV 147	Dinu Lipatti	4:06
16	The Righteous Wrath of an Honorable Man	Colin Stetson	2:27
17	Cutting Branches for a Temporary Shelter	Penguin Cafe Orchestra	1:50
18	Who Knows Where The Time Goes	Nina Simone	4:42
19	Cleo the Cat	Nina Jurisch	0:09
20	Cirkel	Dub Tractor	3:16
21	Honey Bunch	The Gentleman Losers	2:22
22	Them (Piano Solo Edit Exclusive Version)	Nils Frahm	4:15
23	In The Morning (Exclusive Spoken Word Piece)	Cillian Murphy	7:13

== Chart performance ==
Chart (2015)	Peak position
Dutch Albums (Album Top 100)	14
