= Late Night Tales Presents After Dark =

Compilation album by Bill Brewster
- Released: May 5, 2013
- Genre: Disco; funk; house
- Length: 78:03
- Label: Night Time Stories
- Producer: Bill Brewster

Late Night Tales chronology
Late Night Tales: Friendly Fires (2012)	Late Night Tales Presents After Dark (2013)	Late Night Tales: Röyksopp (2013)

Professional ratings
Review scores
Source	Rating
AllMusic	3.5/5 stars

Late Night Tales Presents After Dark is a DJ mix album by Bill Brewster for Late Night Tales series, released by Night Time Stories on 5 May 2013. The album is the first edition of After Dark spinoff series. It diverges from Late Night Tales' usual format of loosely themed and artist-curated mixes and is more of a DJ-led club-oriented mix which includes 70's disco and funk and contemporary house. It features songs and remixes from I:Cube, Jamiroquai, Padded Cell, Zed Bias, François Kevorkian along with some unreleased cuts.

Brewster described After Dark as "dance music for people who know how to make love" while The Vinyl Factory’s Anton Spice called Brewster "a musical polymath” and wrote that “it’s clear the After Dark series was practically invented around Brewster’s bag of nocturnal downtempo electronica."

== Track listing ==
1. “Love the Way You Love Me” - Marti Caine
2. “The Love” (Exclusive Mix) - Linus Loves
3. “Quiller” (Fat Camp Edit/Previously Unreleased) - Quiller
4. “All Around and Away We Go” (Hotel Motel Mix/Previously Unreleased) - Mr Twin Sister
5. “Extraterrestrial Manoeuvres in the Dark” - Tigersushi Bass System
6. “Alright” (DJ Excursion Unreleased Version) - Jamiroquai
7. “Compulsion” (Padded Cell Remix/Previously Unreleased) - Doves
8. “University Band Moon Plain“ (Exclusive Track) - Coober Pedy
9. “Movin’ In“ (Brennan Green Mix) - Jamie Lloyd
10. “Best Is Yet to Come” - Fernando Pulichino
11. “Keep on Pokin’” - Martin Kershaw
12. “Machistador“ (Fat Camp Edit/Previously Unreleased) - Matthieu Chedid
13. “Beach Towel“ (I:Cube Mix) - Karma
14. “Koolade” - Zed Bias
15. “The Go Go” - Beans & Company
16. “After Dark” (Exclusive Track) - Tad Wily
17. “Blow Your Body” (François K Deep Space Dub) - Herbest Moon
18. “Space Talk” - Asha Puthli

== See also ==
- Late Night Tales Presents After Dark: Nightshift
- Late Night Tales Presents After Dark: Nocturne
