= Late Night Tales: Jon Hopkins =

Compilation album by Jon Hopkins
- Released: 2 March 2015
- Genre: Electronic, experimental, spoken word
- Label: Night Time Stories
- Producer: Jon Hopkins
- Compiler: Jon Hopkins

Jon Hopkins chronology
Immunity (2013)	Late Night Tales: Jon Hopkins (2015)

Late Night Tales chronology
Late Night Tales presents Automatic Soul (2014)	Late Night Tales: Jon Hopkins (2015)	Late Night Tales Presents After Dark: Nocturne (2015)

Professional ratings
Aggregate scores
Source	Rating
Metacritic	70/100
Review scores
Source	Rating
Allmusic	4/5 stars
Clash	7/10 stars
Exclaim!	7/10 stars
The Irish Times	4/5 stars
Nothing but Hope and Passion	4.3/5 stars
Pitchfork Media	7.5/10 stars

Late Night Tales: Jon Hopkins is a mix album compiled by English producer and musician Jon Hopkins, released on 2 March 2015 as part of the Late Night Tales series. The mix includes tracks from artists such as Darkstar, Teebs, Nils Frahm, Letherette and Four Tet. It also features an exclusive cover version of Yeasayer’s "I Remember".

== Track listing ==
No.	Title	Artist(s)	Length
1.	"Sleepers Beat Theme"	Ben Lukas Boysen	4:37
2.	"Hold Me Down"	Darkstar	7:18
3.	"Yr Love"	Holy Other	4:42
4.	"Verbena Tea with Rebekah Raff"	Teebs	4:24
5.	"More"	Nils Frahm	8:56
6.	"I Am Daylights"	Songs of Green Pheasant	3:05
7.	"Daníell in the Sea"	Jónsi & Alex	7:10
8.	"Babe"	Evenings	2:25
9.	"After Dawn"	Letherette	4:31
10.	"I Remember (Yeasayer cover version)"	Jon Hopkins	4:21
11.	"Hey Maggy"	David Holmes	4:59
12.	"Lady Divine"	Alela Diane	5:12
13.	"Gillie Amma I Love You"	Four Tet	5:12
14.	"Connjur"	School of Seven Bells	4:37
15.	"And It's Alright (Nils Frahm Remix)"	Peter Broderick	4:34
16.	"Before Tigers (Gold Panda Remix)"	Health	5:23
17.	"Missing Photos"	Last Days	2:02
18.	"Down To The Sound"	Bibio	2:35
19.	"Requiem For The Static King 1"	A Winged Victory For The Sullen	2:46
20.	"Emancipation"	Helios	2:34
21.	"I Remember"	Rick Holland	3:28
