= Late Night Tales =

Series of artist-curated compilation albums

Late Night Tales logo

Late Night Tales and its predecessor Another Late Night are the names of two related series of artist-curated compilation albums released by Azuli Records in the UK until 2009 when the independent record label Night Time Stories took over the series. Both series were started by the author A.W. Wilde. The tracks on the albums are selected and mixed by a diverse selection of artists asked by Late Night Tales to create the ultimate late night mix. Many of the albums end with a story track, read by famous English performers including Benedict Cumberbatch, Will Self, Brian Blessed, Alex Turner and Patrick Moore. With the exception of Jamiroquai, Air, Bill Brewster, and Don Letts' contributions, each release includes a cover version recorded by the artist(s).

The series has been met with critical acclaim, with GQ praising Late Night Tales as "The Rolls Royce of compilations". 2011 saw the label celebrate their tenth anniversary with a box set including all albums to date.

== Albums ==
Editions of Late Night Tales
No.	Album name	Artist	Release date	Cat. No.	Singles
1	Another Late Night: Fila Brazillia	Fila Brazillia	19 February 2001	ALN01	"Nature Boy" (Nat King Cole cover version)
2	Another Late Night: Howie B	Howie B	24 July 2001	ALN02	"Under the Boardwalk" (The Drifters cover version)
3	Another Late Night: Rae & Christian	Rae & Christian	1 March 2001	ALN03	"Flashlight" (Parliament cover version)
4	Another Late Night: Zero 7	Zero 7	18 February 2002	ALN04	"Truths and Rights" (Johnny Osbourne cover version)
5	Another Late Night: Groove Armada	Groove Armada	3 June 2002	ALN05	"Fly Me to the Moon" (Frank Sinatra cover version)
6	Another Late Night: Tommy Guerrero	Tommy Guerrero	23 September 2002	ALN06	"Come Together" (The Beatles cover version)
7	Another Late Night: Kid Loco	Kid Loco	10 February 2003	ALN07	"Paralysed" (Gang of Four cover version)
8	Late Night Tales: Nightmares on Wax	Nightmares on Wax	12 May 2003	ALN08	"Brothers on the Slide" (Cymande cover version)
9	Late Night Tales: Sly & Robbie	Sly & Robbie	14 July 2003	ALN09	"La Isla Bonita" (Madonna cover version)
10	Late Night Tales: Jamiroquai	Jamiroquai	10 November 2003	ALN10	–
11	Late Night Tales: Turin Brakes	Turin Brakes	16 February 2004	ALN11	"Moonlight Mile" (The Rolling Stones cover version)
12	Late Night Tales: Four Tet	Four Tet	4 October 2004	ALN12	"Castles Made of Sand" (Jimi Hendrix cover version)
13	Late Night Tales: The Flaming Lips	The Flaming Lips	7 March 2005	ALN13	"Seven Nation Army" (The White Stripes cover version)
14	Late Night Tales: Belle & Sebastian	Belle & Sebastian	27 February 2006	ALN14	"Casaco Marron" (Trio Esperanca cover version)
15	Late Night Tales: Air	Air	11 September 2006	ALN15	–
16	Late Night Tales: David Shrigley aka Shrigley Forced to Speak with Others	David Shrigley	23 October 2006	ALN16	–
17	Late Night Tales: Nouvelle Vague	Nouvelle Vague	5 February 2007	ALN17	"Come On Eileen" (Dexys Midnight Runners cover version)
18	Late Night Tales: Lindstrøm	Lindstrøm	9 July 2007	ALN18	"Let It Happen" (Vangelis cover version)
19	Late Night Tales: Fatboy Slim	Fatboy Slim	15 October 2007	ALN19	"Radioactivity" (Kraftwerk cover version)
20	Late Night Tales: Groove Armada	Groove Armada	10 March 2008	ALN20	"Are "Friends" Electric?" (Gary Numan cover version)
21	Late Night Tales: Matt Helders	Arctic Monkeys	27 October 2008	ALN21	Matt Helders – "Dreamer" (feat. Nesreen Shah) + Alex Turner – "A Choice of Three" (Spoken Word)
22	Late Night Tales: Snow Patrol	Snow Patrol	28 September 2009	ALN23	"New Sensation" (INXS cover version)
23	Late Night Tales: The Cinematic Orchestra	The Cinematic Orchestra	5 April 2010	ALN22	"Talking About Freedom" feat. Fontella Bass (Fontella Bass cover version)
24	Late Night Tales: Midlake	Midlake	28 March 2011	ALN24	"Am I Going Insane" (Black Sabbath cover version)
25	Late Night Tales: Trentemøller	Trentemøller	30 May 2011	ALN25	"Blue Hotel" (Chris Isaak cover version)
26	Late Night Tales: MGMT	MGMT	3 October 2011	ALN26	"All We Ever Wanted Was Everything" (Bauhaus cover version)
27	Late Night Tales: Belle and Sebastian Vol. II	Belle and Sebastian	26 March 2012	ALN27	"Crash" (The Primitives cover version)
28	Late Night Tales: Music For Pleasure	Tom Findlay	11 June 2012	ALN28	"How Long" (Ace cover version)
29	Late Night Tales: Metronomy	Metronomy	3 September 2012	ALN29	"Hypnose" (Jean-Michel Jarre cover version)
30	Late Night Tales: Friendly Fires	Friendly Fires	5 November 2012	ALN30	"Why Don't You Answer?" (Eberhard Schoener + Sting cover version)
31	Late Night Tales Presents After Dark	Bill Brewster	5 May 2013	ALN31	–
32	Late Night Tales: Röyksopp	Röyksopp	14 June 2013	ALN32	"Ice Machine" (Depeche Mode cover version)
33	Late Night Tales: Bonobo	Bonobo	17 November 2013	ALN34	"Get Thy Bearings" (Donovan cover version)
34	Late Night Tales: Django Django	Django Django	11 May 2014	ALN35	"Porpoise Song" (Exclusive Monkees Cover Version)
35	Late Night Tales Presents After Dark: Nightshift	Bill Brewster	6 July 2014	ALN36	–
36	Late Night Tales: Franz Ferdinand	Franz Ferdinand	15 September 2014	ALN37	"Leaving My Old Life Behind" (Exclusive Jonathan Halper Cover Version)
37	Late Night Tales presents Automatic Soul	Tom Findlay	3 November 2014	ALN38	"Don't Look Any Further" (Exclusive Dennis Edwards Cover Version)
38	Late Night Tales: Jon Hopkins	Jon Hopkins	2 March 2015	ALN39	"I Remember" (Exclusive Yeasayer Cover Version)
39	Late Night Tales Presents After Dark: Nocturne	Bill Brewster	11 May 2015	ALN41	–
40	Late Night Tales: Nils Frahm	Nils Frahm	11 September 2015	ALN42	"4:33" (Exclusive John Cage Cover Version)
41	Late Night Tales presents Sasha: Scene Delete	Sasha	1 April 2016	ALN43	–
42	Late Night Tales: Ólafur Arnalds	Ólafur Arnalds	24 June 2016	ALN44	"Say My Name" (Exclusive Destiny's Child Cover Version)
43	Late Night Tales: David Holmes	David Holmes	21 October 2016	ALN45	"I'm Not in Love" (Exclusive 10cc Cover Version)
44	Late Night Tales: BadBadNotGood	BadBadNotGood	28 July 2017	ALN46	"To You" (Exclusive Andy Shauf Cover Version)
45	Late Night Tales: Agnes Obel	Agnes Obel	25 May 2018	ALN49	"Poem About Death"
46	Late Night Tales: Floating Points	Floating Points	29 March 2019	ALN52	"Sweet Time Suite Opening (Exclusive Kenny Wheeler Cover Version)"
47	Late Night Tales: Hot Chip	Hot Chip	2 October 2020	ALN56	"Candy Says (Exclusive The Velvet Underground Cover Version)"
48	Late Night Tales: Khruangbin	Khruangbin	4 December 2020	ALN60	"Summer Madness (Exclusive Kool & the Gang Cover Version)"
49	Late Night Tales: Jordan Rakei	Jordan Rakei	9 April 2021	ALN61	"Lover, You Should've Come Over (Exclusive Jeff Buckley Cover Version)"
50	Late Night Tales Presents Version Excursion - Selected by Don Letts	Don Letts	24 September 2021	ALN64	–
51	Late Night Tales presents After Dark: Vespertine	Bill Brewster	4 August 2023	ALN69	–
52	Late Night Tales: Barry Can’t Swim	Barry Can't Swim	6 March 2026	ALN72	"Chala (My Soul Is on a Loop)"

== See also ==
- DJ-Kicks
- Fabric discography
- Solid Steel
