= Late Night Tales Presents After Dark: Nightshift =

Compilation album by Bill Brewster
- Released: July 8, 2014
- Genres: Nu-disco; soul; funk; electro; downtempo
- Length: 77:10
- Label: Night Time Stories
- Producer: Bill Brewster

Late Night Tales chronology
Late Night Tales: Django Django (2014)	Late Night Tales Presents After Dark: Nightshift (2014)	Late Night Tales: Franz Ferdinand (2014)

Professional ratings
Review scores
Source	Rating
AllMusic	3.5/5 stars
Resident Advisor	4.0/5
Pitchfork	7.4/10

Late Night Tales Presents After Dark: Nightshift is a DJ mix album by Bill Brewster for Late Night Tales which is the second from the After Dark spinoff series, released by Night Time Stories on 8 July 2014. Similar to the first entry, Nightshift is a downtempo DJ-led club-oriented mix based on the sounds of nu-disco and funk. It features artists such as Typesun, Kirk Degiorgio, Robert Fripp & The Grid, and Justus Köhncke, among others.

Resident Advisor's Bruce Tantum wrote, "Nightshift is stuffed with great tunes, but the real joy is Brewster's sequencing. He builds the set with a studied patience, its pleasures coming more as subtle hills than obvious peaks and valleys." Andy Beta of Pitchfork wrote, "The novelty of the Late Night Tales series of compilations stems in part from hearing what bands themselves like to hear, but in tapping dance curator Bill Brewster for a second compilation in as many years, Late Night Tales’ newest iteration of the series has a proper selector at the helm. Nightshift pulls from the late-‘00s era of nu-disco, offering the slightest variations of a restricted sonic palette."

== Track listing ==
1. "Last Home" (DJ Nature Remix) - Typesun
2. "The Pursuit" (Good Guy Mikesh & Filburt Remix) - The Blaxploited Orchestra
3. "Revnorev" - Gino Fontaine
4. "Soul Machine" - The Salsoul Invention
5. "Neurotic Erotic Adventure" - Neurotic Drum Band
6. "Faraway Sensation" - Day Outside & Fernando Pulichino
7. "Boutade" (Miseridub) - Mugwump
8. "Mopedbart" - Hubbabubbaklubb
9. "Music Is an Open Sky" - Kirk Degiorgio
10. "Not Yet Not Yet" - Crowdpleaser & ST Plomb feat Emilie Nana
11. "Late Train" (Emperor Machine Special Extended Version) - Paqua
12. "A Cabala Sky" - Robert Fripp & The Grid
13. "Haiku" - Asadinho
14. "Tell Me" - Justus Köhncke
15. "People Come In" (Mang Dynasty Edit) - Daniele Patucchi
16. "After Dark" (Dub) - Mang Dynasty
17. "The Flowers That Fell" (Fernando Remix) - Detachments
18. "Magic" - General Lee

== See also ==
- Late Night Tales Presents After Dark
- Late Night Tales Presents After Dark: Nocturne
