= Late Night Tales: Music for Pleasure =

Compilation album by Tom Findlay
- Released: June 11, 2012
- Genre: Yacht rock; blue-eyed soul; soft rock
- Length: 67:20
- Label: Night Time Stories
- Producer: Tom Findlay

Late Night Tales chronology
| Late Night Tales: Belle and Sebastian Vol. II (2012) | Late Night Tales: Music for Pleasure (2012) | Late Night Tales: Metronomy (2012) |

Professional ratings
Review scores
| Source | Rating |
|---|---|
| Pitchfork | 6.4/10 |
| Rolling Stone | 3.5/5 stars |

Late Night Tales: Music for Pleasure is a DJ mix album by Groove Armada's Tom Findlay for Late Night Tales series, released by Night Time Stories on 11 June 2012.

== Content ==
The album features tracks by yacht rock artists such as Toto, Hall & Oates, and Kenny Loggins, among many others.

== Reception ==
Pitchfork's Mark Richardson wrote that "despite the familiarity and easily parodied context of the source material, [the album] works; it does what it was designed to do, probably due to the fact that recording and record-making were at their technological zenith in the late 70s and early 80s."

== Track listing ==
1. "You're the Only Woman (You & I)" – Ambrosia
2. "Every Kinda People" – Robert Palmer
3. "I Keep Forgettin' (Every Time You're Near)" – Michael McDonald
4. "Georgy Porgy" – Toto
5. "What You Won't Do for Love" – Bobby Caldwell
6. "Baby Come Back" – Player
7. "Fly Like an Eagle" – Steve Miller Band
8. "Get it Up for Love" – Ned Doheny
9. "Work to Do" – Average White Band
10. "Lowdown" – Boz Scaggs
11. "How Long" – Sugardaddy
12. "Showdown" – Electric Light Orchestra
13. "Get It Right Next Time" – Gerry Rafferty
14. "It Keeps You Runnin'" – The Doobie Brothers
15. "I’m Just a Kid (Don’t Make Me Feel Like a Man)" – Hall & Oates
16. "The Guitar Man" – Bread
17. "Be Nice to Me" – Todd Rundgren
18. "I'm Not in Love" – 10cc
