= DJhistory.com =

UK website dedicated to the history of dance music and DJing

- Founded: 1999
- Founder: Bill Brewster & Frank Broughton
- Genre: Disco, House, Electronica, Soul music
- Country of origin: UK
- Location: London
- Official website: http://www.djhistory.com

DJhistory.com is a website dedicated to the history of dance music and DJing, and also an online record label and book publishing company. It aims to encourage interest in obscure, overlooked and collectable dance music (in its broadest sense), by creating an archive of reference material on the subject and by licensing and reissuing rare and exceptional music for download.

== History ==
DJhistory.com was launched in November 1999 by dance music historians Bill Brewster and Frank Broughton as an online continuation of their book Last Night A DJ Saved My Life. The website developed into an expert forum of DJs and dance music collectors sharing knowledge about back-catalogue music, including notable DJs François Kevorkian, David Mancuso, Greg Wilson, Prins Thomas and Todd Terje.

== Content ==
DJhistory.com contains full-length transcripts of interviews with many notable DJs and dance music pioneers, which were the source material for Broughton and Brewster's books; an archive of magazine articles relating to the history of dance music; reviews of music, books and DVDs; and "Mystery Mixes", DJ mixes of obscure music which the site's forum members attempt to identify.

In March 2008, DJhistory.com was relaunched with the addition of a music download service selling digital versions of rare and collectable records, including its signature "Secret Weapons" series of powerful but obscure or overlooked dance tracks chosen by a notable DJ from their own collection.

== Discography ==
- DJH-SW001 Secret Weapons 1: Chris Duckenfield's Steely Torpedoes
- DJH-CP001 The Very Best of Swag
- DJH-SW002 Secret Weapons 2: Rhythm Doctor's Bloody Scalpels
- DJH-CP002 Le Disco: Tele Music Remixed
