= Soul Food Taqueria =

Studio album by Tommy Guerrero
- Released: April 8, 2003
- Recorded: 2002–03
- Studio: Function 8 (San Francisco)
- Genres: Chill-out; downtempo; lo-fi
- Length: 53:43
- Labels: Mo' Wax; Beggars Group
- Producers: Tommy Guerrero; Gadget; Monte Vallier

Tommy Guerrero chronology
A Little Bit of Somethin (2000)	Soul Food Taqueria (2003)	From the Soil to the Soul (2006)

Singles from Soul Food Taqueria
- 1. "Gettin' It Together" Released: March 22, 2004

Soul Food Taqueria is the third studio album by American multi-instrumentalist and composer Tommy Guerrero. It was released on April 8, 2003, by Mo' Wax Records.

The album was recorded during 2002 and 2003 in sessions at the Function 8 record label's studio in San Francisco, California. Production, instrumentation and songwriting was primarily handled by Guerrero, with contributions from producers Gadget and Monte Vallier. Rapper Lyrics Born and singer Gresham Taylor performed the few vocal tracks present on the album.

Soul Food Taqueria consists mostly of downtempo, instrumental and sample-based chill-out music. It also incorporates influences from Latin soul, R&B, trip hop, and lo-fi music. Its cover artwork, depicting a taquería that also serves soul food, was designed by artist Stephen Powers.

The album did not receive significant promotion, and no radio singles were issued. While it did not appear on any record charts, Soul Food Taqueria was well received by most critics, who applauded its diverse style and production quality while deeming it an improvement from Guerrero's previous record, A Little Bit of Somethin' (2000).

== Recording and production ==
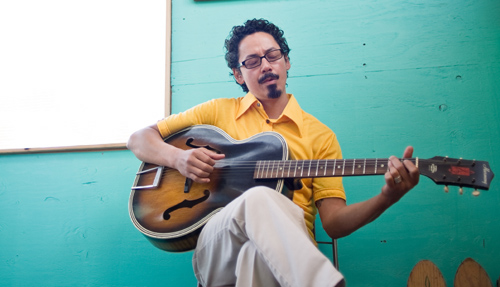
Guerrero in 2012

Recording for Soul Food Taqueria took place at the recording studio of the San Francisco-based independent label Function 8 from 2002 to 2003. Mostly handled by Tommy Guerrero, production for the album also featured audio mixing contributions from producer/engineers Gadget and Monte Vallier. Prior to these sessions, Gadget and Guerrero had previously worked together on independent label projects and collaborations, including their collaborational studio effort, Hoy Yen Ass'n (2000) for Function 8. Most of the instrumentation for the album was employed by Guerrero, while session drummer Chuck Treece and keyboardist Greg Galbreath also contributed to Soul Food Taqueria. All of the album's material was written and arranged by Tommy Guerrero.

The album is primarily sample-based and instrumental, as recording and production followed a lo-fi and downtempo aesthetic. Gadget also assisted in vocal production for the album's three vocal tracks, "Organism", "It Gets Heavy" and "Getting It Together". In contrast to Guerrero's previous studio album A Little Bit of Somethin' (2000), production for Soul Food Taqueria was more polished, despite Guerrero stating that he is "still down with the fucked up 4 track action" upon the album's release. During recording, the instrumentation, sequencing and mixing were more detailed than its predecessor's, as noted by one critic who wrote "everything sounds much more polished and in tune with their surroundings."

== Musical style ==
"Organism"
The song features vocalist Gresham Taylor, breakbeat samples, and wah wah guitar.

"Thank You MK"
The track has bossa nova and West Coast jazz-influenced instrumentation.

Music writers note that the album was inspired by the San Francisco music scene, with AllMusic's Bryan Carroll citing the "general street vibe of San Francisco's Mission district". BBC Collective editor Matt Walton described the music as "chillout music". According to one music writer, the title of the album reflects its "spicy fusion of soul, funk, hip-hop and Latin flavors stirred up in an intoxicating downtempo gumbo that is hard to resist". According to Carmen Johnson of Prefix magazine, the album has Tommy Guerrero, a San Francisco-native, "oozing soul in every track". She also described the music of Soul Food Taqueria as "an exploration into soulful, bass-heavy trip-hop that combines a lot of twists and sweeps through many genres and styles".

The album's music mixes 1970s soul music elements with Latin-style grooves, as well as R&B, samba, drum and bass, and trip hop. The songs also have a retro vibe. One writer noted the diverse musical elements of the album, writing that it contains a "hybrid sound that’s hard to categorize and easy to enjoy". Several of the songs on the album are built on laid-back breakbeat samples. A notable influence on the music is the West Coast jazz of Chet Baker. Similar to Guerrero's previous work, which has been described as "instrumental neo-funk", Soul Food Taqueria encompasses influences from stripped down folk, jazz, lounge, guitar-blues, rock and minimal funk, as well as indie rock. Despite Guerrero's musical background, a CMJ columnist noted the album's similarity to New York City's experimental music scene, citing artists such as the Beastie Boys, Cibo Matto, JSBX and Luscious Jackson. Lily Moayeri of Remix Magazine noted the similarity of the album's "low-key soul threaded through the understated funk" to the work of underground artist Money Mark.

Guerrero's guitar work for the album encompasses styles such as blues and flamenco music, and uses chord progressions and four note melodies, creating "nimble and colorful pieces of musical texture" when mixed in with the rest of the tracks' instrumentation. His guitar playing utilizes a minimal, acoustic and sparse sound and space blended with the live percussion of drummer Chuck Treece, Jupiter-heavy bass lines and keyboardist Greg Galbreath's synths. Vocals are more prevalent on the album than on Guerrero's previous recordings, with vocal tracks from rapper Lyrics Born of Blackalicious, Quannum and Latyrx fame, and long time friend and collaborator, lo-fi and indie pop singer-songwriter Gresham Taylor, credited as Gresham for the album.

== Songs ==
"Thin Brown Layer"
The song's musical arrangement has a Latin influence.

"Terra Unfirma"
The lo-fi instrumental features funk grooves and Guerrero's detailed guitar.

"Interlude And the Day Goes By"
One of atmospheric break tracks.

The minute-long intro track, entitled "Lectric Chile Goat", is a blues-based guitar instrumental performed alone by Tommy Guerrero. The album opener "Abierto" (open in Spanish) consists of low bass lines, allowing for guitar solo interplay that stylistically contrasts the bass, while bells jingle quietly with the drums. "Organism" contains predominant wah-wah guitar effects, which accompany a notable funk groove. "Thank You (MK)" is an ode to the tropics and features soft, jazz instrumentation. Guerrero's guitar arrangement for the song is reminiscent of the music of Brazilian bossa nova musician João Gilberto and American jazz saxophonist Stan Getz, with guitar licks similar to the playing-style of jazz guitarist Wes Montgomery.

Accompanied by delicate harmonies, "Tatanka" is a funk-infused and bass-driven track that features intricate percussion and guitar riffs, as well as unique fret-work by Guerrero. The album contains three atmospheric break tracks, "Train of Thought", "So Many Years Ago" and "And the Day Goes By". One critic stated that the interludes "render the ambience palpable". The adumbral "It Gets Heavy" features melancholic lyrics and folk vocals by Gresham Taylor, which are similar to those of singer-songwriter John Secada. "Thin Brown Layer" has a noticeable Latin rhythm and guitar arrangement. The song also contains a predominant hypnotic beat, which, according to one music critic, "makes you feel stoned even after completing a Twelve step program". "Terra Unifirma", "Another Brother Gone" and "Broken Blood" are built around laid-back grooves and detailed guitar orchestrations.

The moody "It Gets Heavy" features Guerrero and Gresham Taylor singing, and is reminiscent of trip hop artist Tricky, contributing to the album's general sound of hip-hop infected Latin soul. Its lyrics have been described as "socially conscious but thought-provoking". Cited by critics as the standout track on the album, Bryan Carroll described it as "the sole hip-shaker among a gaggle of moodier pieces". The bongo-driven track "Lost Unfound" has Guerrero occupying all instruments, and the album's third vocal track, "Gettin' It Together", features rapper Lyrics Born delivering a blend of emceeing and singing, which is a departure from his previous work. One music writer described the album's closing track, "Falling Awake", as "the most beautiful song Guerrero’s written to date". The song contains melancholic piano arrangements. Another critic noted "Falling Awake"'s meditative sound, writing that its light guitar melodies are "slowly ascending on a journey of Satori".

== Title and packaging ==
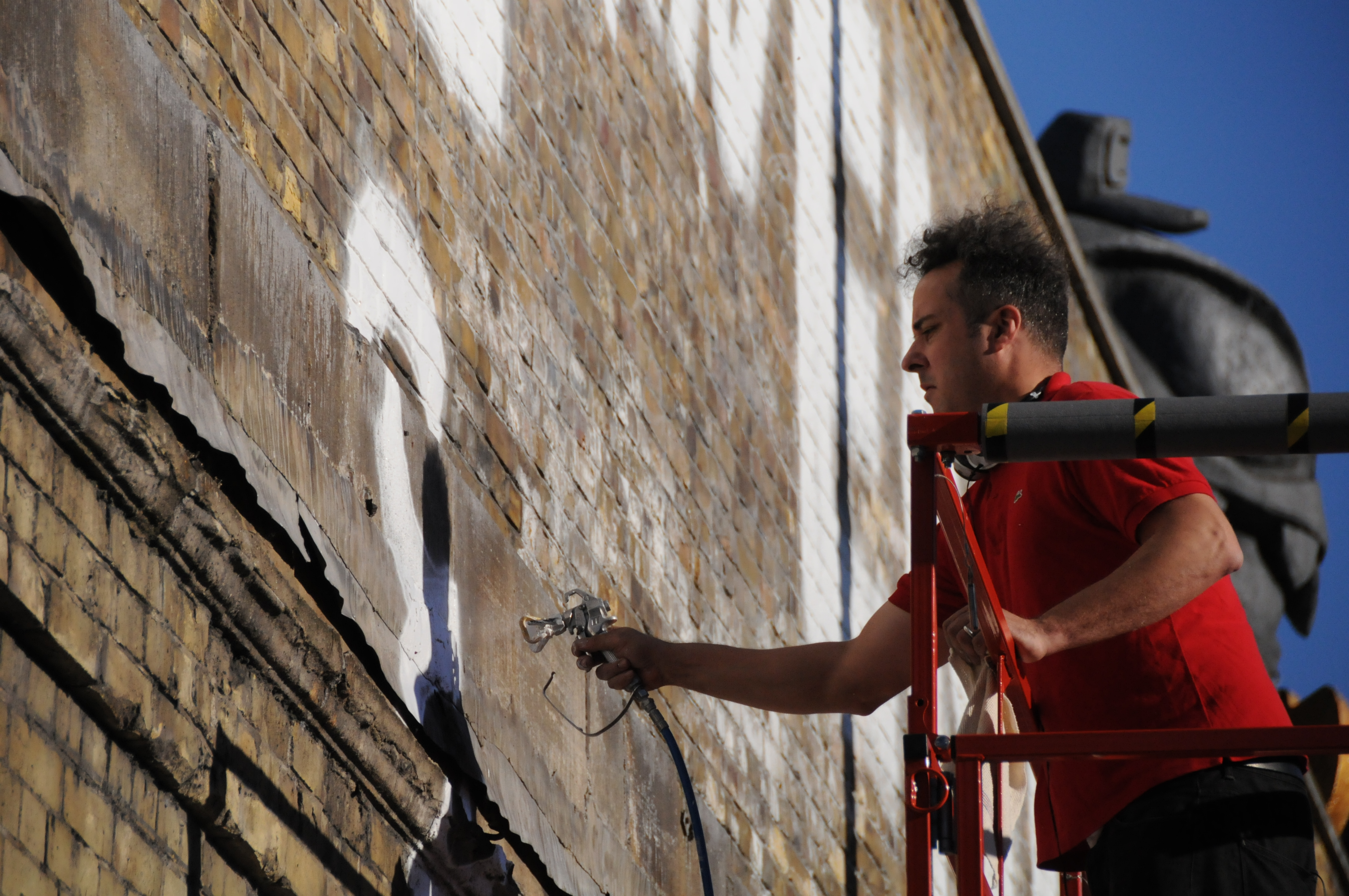
Stephen J. Powers, the cover designer, in 2010

The album's front and back cover artwork, which depict a taquería that serves soul food, was designed by world-renowned graffiti artist and graphic designer Stephen J. Powers, also known as by his moniker ESPO. On September 29, 2007, the album's artwork and other similar works by Powers were displayed at Coney Island's Dreamland Artist Clubhouse in Brooklyn, New York during his studio visit there.

Music journalists have noted the title and artwork as reflective of the album's musical influences. A columnist for the Santa Fe Reporter later described the artwork as "totally cool, with a blocky style depicting some kind of Miami soul food/taco stand." Music journalist Kimberley Chun of the San Francisco Bay Guardian wrote of the concept, stating "So what is a soul food taquería? Do you get a side of collard greens with your menudo?" In an interview with Chun, Guerrero discussed the concept and title, stating "It's just this funny idea I had, growing up in the city – it's so diverse. The city itself is just down-home, down-to-earth, blue-collar, full of everyday kind of people. My music is along the same lines, just being simple – I just try to be honest in what I do."

== Marketing and sales ==
The album featured release in three different countries; the United States on April 8, 2003, and the United Kingdom on April 14 of that same year on Mo' Wax Records, and Japan on April 26, 2003, through the Japanese record label Flavour of Sound Ltd. Released by Flavour of Sound, the Japanese issue of the album contains bonus material previously featured on Guerrero's Junk Collector EP (2001). Soul Food Taqueria was released on the iTunes Store as a digital download on April 28, 2003.

According to website sources such as AllMusic and Billboard.com, the album has not exhibited any charting in the United States since its release. Soul Food Taqueria received some airplay on the college radio station KALX. In Canada, it peaked at number 6 on the CKUA Radio Network's Best of 2003 chart. No promotional or radio singles were released from the album. "Gettin' It Together" later featured a limited edition single release in 12" vinyl format on March 22, 2004, through the Santa Cruz-based label Galaxia. The cover art for the single was designed by Stephen (ESPO) Powers, designer of the album's artwork.

== Critical reception ==
Soul Food Taqueria was well received by music critics. Exclaim! editor Noel Dix observed an improvement in production and complexity of instrumentation by Guerrero from his earlier work, and stated, "This record pours so much heart and emotion into it that you’re bound to feel its warmth and splendor while it’s bumping in your walkman as you trek the city streets." Noting that A Little Bit of Somethin' was criticized as a "lifeless piece of pop-trip-hop", Brian Ho of Dusted praised Guerrero's artistic growth and found "everything" to be "an improvement over its predecessor", writing that the album "is filled to the brim with body and life in a way that few albums can claim". XLR8R critic Liz Cordingley called the album a "nice case of dubby, electric guitar-driven downtempo", and called its music "dusty lo-fi soul that is seductively languid". Joe Warminsky of the Washington City Paper praised Guerrero's minimalist approach to the album's chill-out sound, as the chill-out music genre mostly features implementation of a slicker production. He also compared the lo-fi grooves of Soul Food Taqueria to "Shuggie Otis with Baja roots". Carmen Johnson of Prefix Mag called it a "stellar follow-up to 2000's A Little Bit of Somethin'", and commended Guerrero for producing "his own organic, subterranean blend of bohemian blues, hip-hop and salsa that's creative and adventurous". Johnson called it "the perfect soundtrack for the lazy days that hearken back to the end of summer."

Some reviewers were less enthusiastic. Luke McManus of RTÉ compared its songs to "those jazzy Beastie Boys tracks", and described the sound as "undemanding and smooth". However, McManus criticized the album's mood and wrote, "Soporific, over polite and too damn quiet, Soul Food Taqueira veers dangerously close to snooze territory." Bryan Carroll of AllMusic criticized the predominance of "mood pieces", and stated, "on the whole Soul Food Taqueria fails to stick to the ribs because it simply lacks the proper spice". Other critics cited Guerrero's simple, inventive style and sound for the album as one of its better qualities. Bill Campbell of Ink 19 called the album an "exemplary album ... 100% soul". He also commended Guerrero's musicality, "he constructs heartfelt music with a complexity few can pull off successfully", as well as his guitar playing, as Campbell wrote "his guitar work is subtle and works the spaces between the beats marvelously".

Canadian radio station CKUA ranked the album number 93 on its Best of 2003 Chart. Uptown contributor Anthony Augustine named Soul Food Taqueria as one of the Top 10 albums of 2003. In a January 2004 issue, Ulli Pfleger of Germany's publication of Rolling Stone ranked the album number two on his "best of list" of 2003.

== Track listing ==
All tracks are written by Tommy Guerrero.

No.	Title	Producer(s)	Length
1.	"Intro Lectric Chile Goat"	Tommy Guerrero, Monte Vallier*	0:56
2.	"Abierto"	Tommy Guerrero, Monte Vallier*	3:59
3.	"Organism" (feat. Gresham Taylor)	Tommy Guerrero, Monte Vallier*	4:08
4.	"Thank You MK"	Tommy Guerrero, Monte Vallier*	3:51
5.	"Tatanka"	Tommy Guerrero, Monte Vallier*	4:10
6.	"Interlude Train of Thought"	Tommy Guerrero, Monte Vallier*	1:20
7.	"It Gets Heavy" (feat. Gresham Taylor)	Tommy Guerrero, Monte Vallier*, Gadget*	3:23
8.	"Thin Brown Layer"	Tommy Guerrero, Monte Vallier*	4:40
9.	"Interlude So Many Years Ago"	Tommy Guerrero, Monte Vallier*	0:45
10.	"Terra Unfirma"	Tommy Guerrero, Monte Vallier*	4:05
11.	"Gettin' It Together" (feat. Lyrics Born)	Tommy Guerrero, Monte Vallier*, Gadget*	3:23
12.	"Another Brother Gone"	Tommy Guerrero, Monte Vallier*	2:28
13.	"Broken Blood"	Tommy Guerrero, Monte Vallier*, Gadget*	3:48
14.	"Interlude And the Day Goes By"	Tommy Guerrero, Monte Vallier*	1:28
15.	"Lost Unfound"	Tommy Guerrero, Monte Vallier*	3:32
16.	"The Color of Life"	Tommy Guerrero, Monte Vallier*	3:58
17.	"Falling Awake"	Tommy Guerrero, Monte Vallier*	3:57

Japan bonus tracks
No.	Title	Producer(s)	Length
18.	"Rusty Gears, Lonely Years"	Tommy Guerrero, John Herndon*	3:57
19.	"Birds Over Head"	Tommy Guerrero, John Herndon*	5:20
20.	"Sea Sick"	Tommy Guerrero, John Herndon*	6:14
21.	"It Gets Heavy" (Original version)	Tommy Guerrero, John Herndon*	3:28

*Co-producer

== Personnel ==
Credits adapted from album sleeve liner notes.

#	Title	Notes
	Soul Food Taqueria	All tracks written and produced by Tommy Guerrero; Published by Fo Traques Ana Munkey Music (BMI); All instruments by Tommy Guerrero except where noted All songs mixed at Function 8 by Monte Vallier except where noted Gresham appears courtesy of Function 8 Records; Lyrics Born appears courtesy of Quannum Projects; Art by Stephen (Espo) Powers
1	"Lectric Chile Goat (Intro)"	Mixed by Monte Vallier; All instruments: Tommy Guerrero
2	"Abierto"	Mixed by Monte Vallier; All instruments: Tommy Guerrero
3	"Organism"	Mixed by Monte Vallier; Vocals: Gresham Taylor; Additional keys: Greg Galbreath; All other instruments: Tommy Guerrero
4	"Thank You MK"	Mixed by Monte Vallier; All instruments: Tommy Guerrero
5	"Tatanka"	Mixed by Monte Vallier; Drums: Chuck Treece; All other instruments: Tommy Guerrero
6	"Train of Thought (Interlude)"	Mixed by Monte Vallier; All instruments: Tommy Guerrero
7	"It Gets Heavy"	Mixed by Monte Vallier and Gadget; Additional vocal production by Gadget; Vocals: Gresham Taylor; All instruments: Tommy Guerrero
8	"Thin Brown Layer"	Mixed by Monte Vallier; All instruments: Tommy Guerrero
9	"So Many Years Ago (Interlude)"	Mixed by Monte Vallier; All instruments: Tommy Guerrero
10	"Terra Unfirma"	Mixed by Monte Vallier; All instruments: Tommy Guerrero
11	"Gettin' It Together"	Mixed by Monte Vallier and Gadget; Additional vocal production by Gadget; Vocals: Lyrics Born; Drums: Chuck Treece; All other instruments: Tommy Guerrero
12	"Another Brother Gone"	Mixed by Monte Vallier; All instruments: Tommy Guerrero
13	"Broken Blood"	Mixed by Monte Vallier and Gadget; Drums: Chuck Treece; All other instruments: Tommy Guerrero
14	"And the Day Goes By (Interlude)"	Mixed by Monte Vallier; All instruments: Tommy Guerrero
15	"Lost Unfound"	Mixed by Monte Vallier; All instruments: Tommy Guerrero
16	"The Color of Life"	Mixed by Monte Vallier; Drums: Chuck Treece; All other instruments: Tommy Guerrero
17	"Falling Awake"	Mixed by Monte Vallier; All instruments: Tommy Guerrero

== Release history ==
Country	Date	Label	Format
United States	April 8, 2003	Mo' Wax Records	stereo CD
United Kingdom	April 14, 2003	Mo' Wax Records	vinyl LP
Japan	April 26, 2003	Flavour of Sound Ltd.	stereo CD

== Bibliography ==
- Tommy Guerrero (2003). Soul Food Taqueria. CD liner notes. Mo Wax Labels Ltd.
