= After Dark (Mr.Kitty song) =

- Culttastic remix cover

Song by Mr.Kitty

from the album Time
- Released: July 8, 2014
- Length: 4:18
- Label: Negative Gain
- Producer: Mr.Kitty

Licensed audio
- "After Dark" on YouTube

Audio sample
- Mr.Kitty – "After Dark": file; help

"After Dark" is a song written, produced, and performed by American musician Mr.Kitty. It was released on July 8, 2014, as the ninth track from his fifth studio album, Time. The song later went viral on YouTube and TikTok several years after its release.

== Background and commercial performance ==
The song rose to prominence following a 2019 fan video on YouTube, of Jennifer Connelly in John Hughes' 1991 film Career Opportunities. In 2021, it later went viral on TikTok. "After Dark" peaked at number 195 on the Billboard Global 200 chart, becoming Mr.Kitty's first entry on the Billboard charts. On January 1, 2025, it received a gold certification from the British Phonographic Industry.

== Charts ==
Chart performance for "After Dark"
Chart (2022)	Peak position
Global 200 (Billboard)	195

== Certifications and sales ==
Certifications and sales for After Dark
Region	Certification	Certified units/sales
United Kingdom (BPI)	Gold	400,000^{‡}
^{‡} Sales+streaming figures based on certification alone.

== Release history ==
Release dates and formats
Region	Date	Format(s)	Version	Label	Ref.
Various	March 20, 2026	Digital download; streaming	Culttastic remix	Positive Loss	
