= Bill Brewster (DJ) =

British writer and disc jockey

Bill Brewster is a British writer, producer and disc jockey. He co-wrote the book Last Night a DJ Saved My Life with Frank Broughton. The duo also launched and run Djhistory.com. In 2002, Brewster's mix album, Praxis, was released on Hooj Choons. He co-founded a number of small music labels, including Disco Sucks with Theo Noble.

He has also curated the After Dark spinoff series for Late Night Tales, including After Dark, After Dark: Nightshift, and After Dark: Nocturne.

== Early life ==
Brewster was born in Grimsby, England.

== Career ==
Brewster worked as a music journalist and later became editor of Mixmag USA. He has written about dance music and club culture for publications including The Face, Muzik, and The Guardian. He has also worked as a DJ and compiler of dance music collections.

He released the compilation album Praxis in 2002 through Hooj Choons. Sometime musician and songwriter, Brewster appeared with Group Therapy (Kamera Records: "Arty Fact"), Expanding Wallets and The Andertons.

He currently hosts a radio show on NTS, an independent online radio station headquartered in London, entitled Low Life Loves You.

== Writing ==
In 1999, Brewster and Frank Broughton published Last Night a DJ Saved My Life: The History of the Disc Jockey. The book traces the development of DJ culture from early radio broadcasting and reggae sound systems to disco, hip hop, house, and techno. A revised and expanded edition was published in 2022.

== Bibliography ==
- Last Night a DJ Saved My Life: The History of the Disc Jockey (with Frank Broughton, 1999)
- The Record Players: DJ Revolutionaries (with Frank Broughton, 2010)
