= Last Night a DJ Saved My Life (book) =

1999 book by Bill Brewster and Frank Broughton

Last Night a DJ Saved My Life: The History of the Disc Jockey
- Author: Bill Brewster and Frank Broughton
- Publisher: Headline Book Publishing
- Publication date: 1999
- Pages: 435
- ISBN: 978-0747275732

Last Night a DJ Saved My Life is a book written by Bill Brewster and Frank Broughton about the history of DJing published in 1999. A compilation album of the same name was released with the book. The album contains various clips ranging from 1970s reggae to Handel's Largo, the first song to reach radio airwaves, in 1906. The book takes its name from the Indeep single "Last Night a DJ Saved My Life." In 2006, The Observer named Last Night... #45 on their list of the greatest music books.

Both experienced journalists, Brewster and Broughton seek to chronicle the role of the DJ in the 20th century. Starting from Jimmy Savile, Broughton and Brewster track the rise of the DJ as a figure in music. The authors champion the idea that the DJ is an "unsung hero" of popular music and is an artist himself. In examining the place of a DJ over time, Last Night... also follows the rise and fall of various musical genres and subcultures.

The companion album, which was compiled by Brewster himself, serves as an overview of dance and DJ music.

== The DJ ==
In their book, Brewster and Broughton talk significantly about of the DJ on popular forms of Black music like Reggae and Disco. For reggae music, they describe "disco as king" because the DJ was responsible for using the sound system to engage in practices like toasting, versioning, and sound clash in the formulation of reggae music. This led to the modern American DJ, as DJs began to use their power to "grab the mic" and began rhyming and using rhythm to hype crowds (95-98).

== Publication ==
In the weeks following the book's release, Nuphonic released an accompanying soundtrack as a 14-track compact disc and triple-vinyl set. The authors also released a collection of DJ interviews in 2010, The Record Players: DJ Revolutionaries.

The authors updated the book in a 2022 edition, adding detail on the role of women in the history of dance music.

== Legacy ==
The book sparked James Murphy (of LCD Soundsystem)'s love of the disco genre.

== Album ==
Last Night a DJ Saved My Life

Compilation album by Various
- Released: December 19, 2000
- Genres: R&B, disco, reggae, hip hop, house, classical
- Label: Nuphonic

=== Track listing ===
1. Georg Friedrich Händel - "Largo" (0:33)
2. DJ Premier - "Red Alert Chant" (1:58)
3. Dave Barker - "I Got To Get Away" (2:10)
4. U-Roy - "True True" (2:10)
5. Bernard Purdie - "Funky Donkey" (2:52)
6. Frank Wilson - "Do I Love You (Indeed I Do)" (2:32)
7. The Carstairs - "It Really Hurts Me Girl (Tom Moulton Remix)" (3:32)
8. Tanya Winley - "Vicious Rap" (7:14)
9. Patti LaBelle - "Get Ready (Looking For Loving) (Back To The Music Box Edit)" (8:06)
10. MFSB / The Salsoul Orchestra - "Love Is The Message (Danny Krivit Re-edit)" (11:00)
11. Chas Jankel - "Glad To Know You (Disconet Re-edit)" (7:29)
12. Class Action - "Weekend (Larry Levan Weekend Mix)" (8:22)
13. Jah Wobble, The Edge, Holger Czukay - "Snakecharmer (François Kevorkian Snake Dub)" (6:55)
14. Jungle Wonz - "Bird In A Gilded Cage" (3:55)
15. Visage - "Frequency 7 (Dance Mix)" (5:02)
