= Azuli Records =

British independent record label

- Parent company: Defected Records
- Founded: 1991
- Founder: Dave Piccioni
- Defunct: 2009
- Status: Defunct
- Genre: Electronic
- Country of origin: UK
- Location: London
- Official website: azuli.com

Azuli Records was a British independent record label, focusing mainly on house music and other forms of electronic dance music. The label was founded by DJ Dave Piccioni in London, England in 1991 but went into liquidation in April 2009. Some of its back catalogue was sold to Phoenix Music International Ltd. The label was re-launched by Piccioni and administered by Defected Records. In 2012, the label was sold to Defected Records.

Releases included the Choice series.

== History ==
The Azuli Records label was the UK's longest-running house label, releasing a total of 278 singles on Azuli Label and over 60 albums.Dave Piccioni, a DJ who had lived in New York's formative house community, began by selling 12" singles from the back of a van.

In 1990, Piccioni took over Black Market Records shop in London, and in 1991 he started Azuli Records.

At the time there was a lot of house coming out in London from the acid scene but also a lot of stuff that was more American sounding which we wanted to put out.

— David Piccioni

Azuli's debut release was Chocolate Fudge's "In A Fantasy". By the mid-1990s, the label began to have UK chart crossover hits.

After about seven or eight releases we had already gained a lot of credibility, but we weren't actually selling that many records. We were on a honeymoon period where all the magazines were talking about us but it didn't really reflect on sales.

— David Piccioni

In 1998, Azuli released the hit single "Needin' U" by David Morales, followed by other hits including Eclipse's "Makes Me Love You" (1999) and Afro Medusa's "Pasilda" (2000), the latter of which reached number 31 in the UK Singles Chart in October 2000. The label has since released over 200 singles and a number of compilations albums by Frankie Knuckles, Joey Negro, François K and Danny Tenaglia.

Azuli have also released a number of DJ mix album and compilation album series':

The Choice compilation series are retrospective albums, wherein all tracks are selected by renowned DJs. DJ's include Danny Tenaglia, Tony Humphries, François K and Derrick L. Carter, X-Press 2, Jeff Mills and John Digweed.

The label also releases annual compilation CD entitled Miami, Space: Ibiza and Made in Italy.

Finally, the Club Azuli project was a compilation series featuring current dancefloor hits, in both mixed and unmixed versions. Club Azuli is also the title of Azuli's event program which, for the past two years, has been visiting the finest clubs across the globe.

== Discography ==
=== Choice Series ===
- Derrick L. Carter 2 x CD Album
- Roger Sanchez (Unmixed) 2 x CD Album
- Roger Sanchez (Mixed) 2 x CD Album
- Louie Vega (Unmixed) Limited Edition 2 x CD Album
- Kenny Dope (Unmixed) 2 x CD Album
- Kenny Dope (Mixed) 2 x CD Album
- Danny Howells (Unmixed) 2 x CD Album
- Danny Howells 2 x CD Album
- John Digweed 2 x CD Album
- X Press 2 2 x CD Album
- Jeff Mills 2 x CD Album
- Louie Vega 2 x CD Album
- Tony Humphries 2 x CD Album
- Danny Tenaglia 2 x CD Album
- Francois K 2 x CD Album
- Frankie Knuckles 2 x CD Album

=== House / club albums ===
- Miami 2008 (Unmixed Limited Edition) 2 x CD Album
- Miami 2008 (Mixed) 2 x CD Album
- Club Azuli 5 Vinyl Sampler 2 x LP Album
- Club Azuli 5 (Unmixed) - Future Sound Of The Dance Underground 2 x CD Album
- Azuli Presents - Space Annual 2007 (Unmixed) 2 x CD Album
- Azuli Presents - Space Annual 07 (Mixed) 2 x CD Album
- Club Azuli 5 (Mixed) - Future Sound Of The Dance Underground 2 x CD Album
- Club Azuli Ibiza 2007 Unmixed 2 x CD Album
- Las Tardes En Ibiza 2007 2 x CD Album
- Club Azuli Ibiza (Mixed) - Future Sound Of The Dance Underground 2 x CD Album
- Space Ibiza 2007 Unmixed 2 x CD Album
- Azuli Presents - Space Ibiza 07 2 x CD Album
- Space Tranquil - Volumen Tres CD Album
- Miami 2007 (Mixed) 2 x CD Album
- Club Azuli 2007 (Unmixed) - Future Sound Of The Dance Underground 2 x CD Album
- Club Azuli 2007 (Mixed) - Future Sound Of The Dance Underground 2 x CD Album
- Space Annual #1 (Unmixed) 2 x CD Album
- Space Annual #1 (Mixed) 2 x CD Album
- Circo Loco 2006 - Mixed by Tania Vulcano & Cirillo 2 x CD Album
- Club Azuli 02/06 (Unmixed) - Future Sound Of The Dance Underground 2 x CD Album
- Club Azuli 02/06 (Mixed) - Future Sound Of The Dance Underground 2 x CD Album
- Azuli Presents - Space Tranquil Volumen Dos CD Album
- Azuli Presents - Space Ibiza 06 2 x CD Album
- Azuli Presents - Miami 2006 Unmixed 2 x CD Album
- Azuli Presents - Miami 2006 Mixed 2 x CD Album
- Club Azuli (DJ Unmixed) - Future Sound Of The Dance Underground (Unmixed) 2 x CD Album
- Club Azuli (Mixed) - Future Sound Of The Dance Underground 2 x CD Album
- Azuli Presents - Space Tranquil Volumen Uno CD Album
- Azuli Presents - Space Ibiza 04 2 x CD Album
- Azuli Presents - Miami 2005 Unmixed 2 x CD Album
- Azuli Presents - Miami 2005 Mixed 2 x CD Album
- Azuli Presents - Space Ibiza 05 2 x CD Album
- Big Wheels Of Azuli 2 x CD Album
- Azuli Presents - Miami 2004 2 x CD Album
- Azuli Presents - Miami 2002 2 x CD Album
- Azuli Presents - Miami 2001 2 x CD Album
- Joey Negro - Back To The Scene of The Crime CD Album
- Black Market Presents - 2 Step Volume 2 CD Album
- Azuli Presents - Miami 2000 CD Album
- Black Market Presents - 2 Step Volume 1 CD Album
- Joey Negro - Can't Get High Without You CD Album
- Romanthony - Romanworld CD Album
- Another Fine Mess - Fila Brazillia CD Album
- Another Fine Mess - Fila Brazillia 3 x LP Album
- Another Fine Mess - FC Kahuna CD Album
- Another Fine Mess - FC Kahuna 2 x LP Album
- Space: Ibiza 2003 (Mixed By Smokin Jo & Reche) 2 x CD Album
- Azuli Presents - Miami 2003 2 x CD Album
- Azuli Presents - Vertigo CD Album
- Azuli Presents - Wild Fruit 2 x CD Album
- Azuli Presents - Faith Vol. 2 2 x CD Album
- La Troya - Ibiza 2008
- Space Ibiza 08 Unmixed Limited Edition
- Space Ibiza 08 Las Tardes en Ibiza 2008 -
- 10th Anniversary Groove Armada - Are Friends Electric
- Choice - Derrick L. Carter
- Miami 2008 (Unmixed Limited Edition)
- Miami 2008 (Mixed)
- Club Azuli 5 Vinyl Sampler
- Club Azuli 5 (Unmixed) - Future Sound Of The Dance Underground
- Azuli Presents - Space Annual 2007 (Unmixed)
- Club Azuli 5 (Unmixed) - Future Sound Of The Dance Underground

=== Events ===
- Club Azuli
