= Late Night Tales: Barry Can't Swim =

2026 compilation album

Compilation album by Barry Can't Swim
- Released: 6 March 2026
- Genre: Balearic; chillout; electronic; jazz; spoken word
- Label: Night Time Stories
- Producer: Barry Can't Swim

Barry Can't Swim chronology
Loner (2025)	Late Night Tales: Barry Can't Swim (2026)

Late Night Tales chronology
Late Night Tales Presents After Dark: Vespertine (2023)	Late Night Tales: Barry Can't Swim (2026)

Late Night Tales: Barry Can't Swim is a DJ mix album curated by Scottish producer and musician Joshua Mainnie, under the alias Barry Can't Swim, for the Late Night Tales series. Released by Night Time Stories on 6 March 2026, it is the first mix to be released under the Late Night Tales banner since 2020, and marks the 25th anniversary of the series. It includes cover versions of Boz Scaggs's "Lowdown" and Felt's "Ferdinand Magellan", as well as two Barry Can't Swim originals, one of which, "Chala (My Soul Is On A Loop)", was released as the album's lead single.

The spoken-word closing track was written and read by Scottish poet and Mainnie collaborator Séamus, who also featured on Loner.

== Background ==
Mainnie compared the experience of selecting tracks for the mix to a Spotify playlist he calls "Barry Can't Curate", where he compiles music he loves but is not necessarily suitable for a DJ set.

The album was released as an unmixed double vinyl LP and a mixed CD, with both mixed and unmixed versions available for streaming and digital download.

== Critical reception ==
Professional ratings
Aggregate scores
Source	Rating
Metacritic	79/100
Review scores
Source	Rating
AllMusic	3.5/5 stars
Clash	8/10
Popmatters	8/10

On review aggregator Metacritic, the album received a score of 79 out of 100, indicating "generally favorable reviews".

AllMusic's Paul Simpson, who also reviewed Mainnie's debut When Will We Land? and sophomore effort Loner, noted the more downtempo, "Balearic chillout" focus of the mix compared to the aforementioned Barry Can't Swim productions, highlighting the "cosmic trip hop" of "Afternoon at Bärenquell" by saxophonist Loket and the progression from an introspective early section to a more house-oriented portion of the mix before closing with a run of ethereal, contemplative tracks.

Harvey Marwood of Clash praised the mix as "seamlessly curated with authenticity and flair [...] perhaps not typically what you’d expect from Barry Can’t Swim, but that is exactly the point".

Writing in Popmatters, J. Simpson welcomed the return of the Late Night Tales series, noting that "expert curation seems more necessary than ever" amid the increasingly genre-agnostic nature of electronica and the sheer volume of new music being released. He also singled out "Afternoon at Bärenquell" as "dispelling any worry that [the album] is just going to be some non-descript yoga playlist", and the "Gnawa-by-way-of-Twin-Peaks of Majid Bekkas" and "crisp trance/techno" of "Back to Pangea Part II (Jazzapella Version)" as other highlights of the mix.

== Track listing ==
1. Jackson Mico Milas – "Sea, Interior"
2. Majid Bekkas & Magic Spirit Quartet – "Annabi"
3. Jesse Bru – "The Coast"
4. Loket – "Afternoon At Bärenquell"
5. Superpitcher – "Yves (Exclusive LNT Edit)"
6. Scott Orr – "Scott"
7. Barry Can't Swim – "Sometimes I Feel So Alone"
8. Marigold Sun – "Here Lies Love"
9. Barry Can't Swim – "Chala (My Soul Is On A Loop)"
10. Freddy Da Stupid – "Back To Pangea Part II (Jazzapella Version)"
11. Factory Floor – "How You Say (Daniel Avery Remix)"
12. Ronald Langestraat – "Lowdown" (Boz Scaggs cover)
13. Lance Desardi – "The Power of Suggestion"
14. O'Flynn – "Kola"
15. Accelera Deck – "This Bliss"
16. Pépe – "Goma (A-Mix)"
17. This Mortal Coil – "The Lacemaker"
18. St Francis Hotel – "Dawn"
19. Barry Can't Swim – "Ferdinand Magellan" (Felt cover)
20. Seamus – "Ultrasound" (spoken word)
