= Edinburgh International Book Festival =

Literary festival in the City of Edinburgh

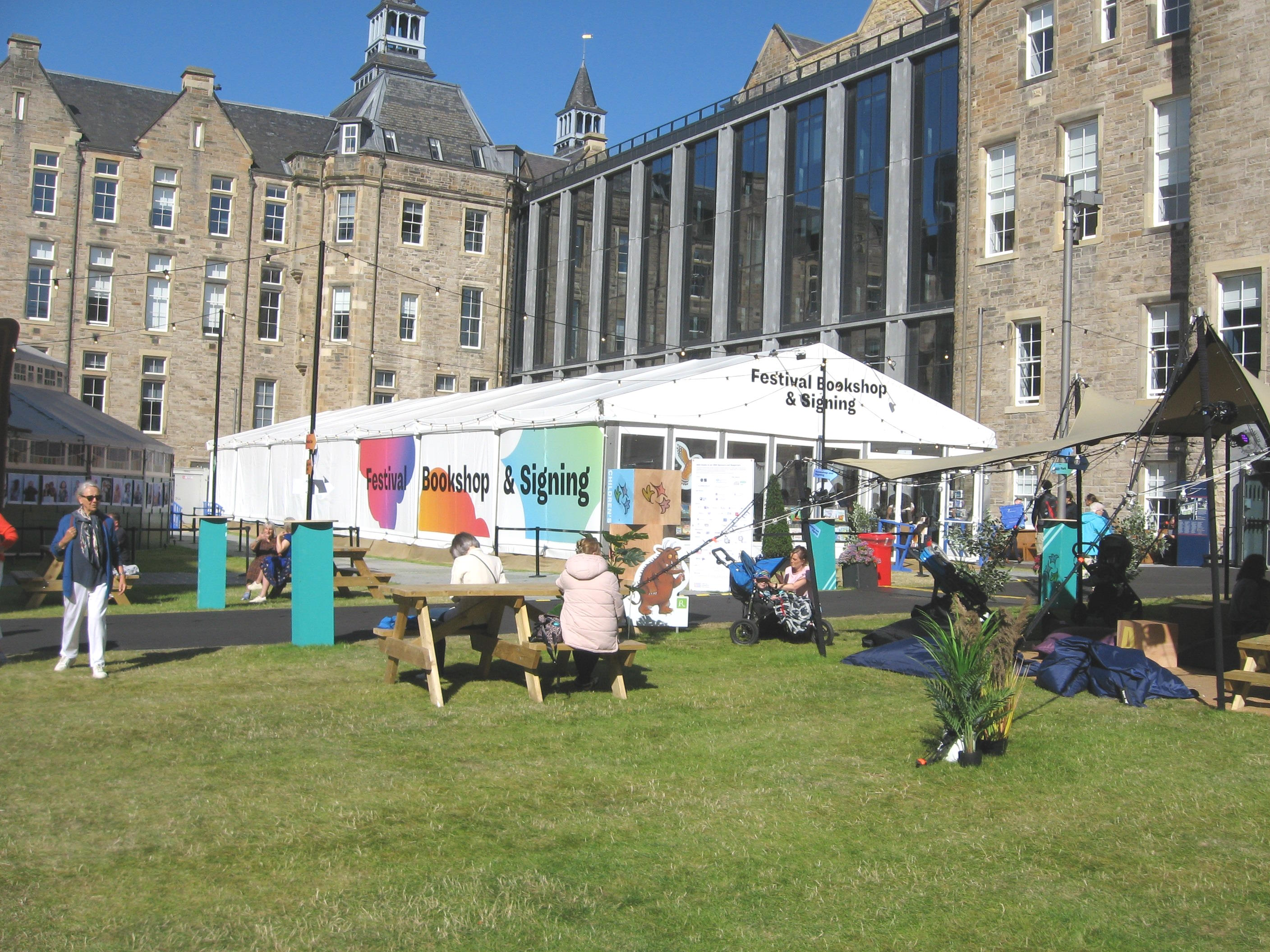
- The 2024 edition, held at the Futures Institute
- Genre: Literary festival
- Date: Two weeks every August
- Frequency: Annual
- Venue: Edinburgh Futures Institute
- Locations: Lauriston, Edinburgh, Scotland
- Country: Scotland
- Years active: 1983–present
- Most recent: 9–24 August 2025
- Next event: 15–30 August 2026
- Participants: Authors, novelists, politicians
- Attendance: ~162,000 (2025)
- Leader: Jenny Niven
- Patron: Sir Ian Rankin
- Website: www.edbookfest.co.uk

The Edinburgh International Book Festival (EIBF) is a book festival that takes place during two weeks of each August in the centre of Edinburgh, Scotland. Described as "the largest festival of its kind in the world", the festival hosts a series of cultural and political talks and debates, along with a well-established children's events programme.

It overlaps the Edinburgh International Festival and the Edinburgh Festival Fringe, as well as some of the other events that comprise the Edinburgh Festival. Jenny Niven is the Director and CEO.

== History ==
The first Book Festival took place in a tent in Edinburgh in 1983. Initially a biennial event, it began to be held annually in 1997. It is a large (225,000 visitors in 2015) and growing international event, central to Edinburgh's acclaimed August arts celebrations. Perhaps partly as a result of this, Edinburgh was named the first UNESCO City of Literature in 2004. The Festival in Charlotte Square was cancelled in 2020 because of the COVID-19 pandemic but some events were held online.

== Programme ==
In 2016 there were over 800 authors and others from over 55 countries in the 17 days that the festival ran. Events ranged from writing workshops, education events, panel discussions, to talks and performances by international writers, poets, playwrights, musicians, illustrators, historians and philosophers. There are events for both adults and children.
Past festivals have featured the likes of:

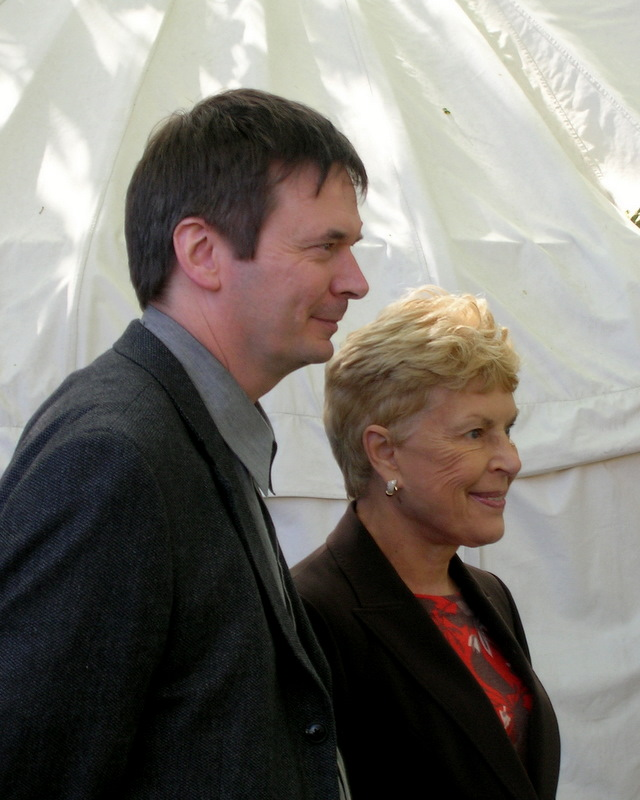
Ian Rankin and Ruth Rendell at the Edinburgh International Book Festival, 2007

- Margaret Atwood
- Gordon Brown
- Alan Bennet
- Douglas Coupland
- Sebastian Faulks
- Franz Ferdinand
- Al Gore
- Germaine Greer
- Alexander McCall Smith
- Val McDermid
- Candia McWilliam
- Yann Martell
- George Monbiot
- Toni Morrison
- Harold Pinter
- Ian Rankin
- J. K. Rowling
- Salman Rushdie
- Darren Shan
- Susan Sontag
- Zadie Smith
- Andrew O'Hagan

Running alongside the general programme is a Children's programme. Incorporating workshops, storytelling, panel discussions, author events and book signings, the Children's programme is popular with both the public and schools alike, and is among the world's largest books and reading event for young people. It regularly attracts authors like Jacqueline Wilson, Joan Lingard, Charlie Higson and Anne Fine.

There is also an Unbound programme which takes place in the evening, with free music and spoken word events sponsored by Edinburgh Gin.

In May 2016 a pilot satellite literary event, organised by the Book Festival, took place in Falkirk called LandWords. In August 2016, using the name Booked!, the Book Festival held events in three other locations in Scotland (Aberdeen, Greenock and Galashiels). This expansion was partially funded by the People's Postcode Lottery.

== Venue ==
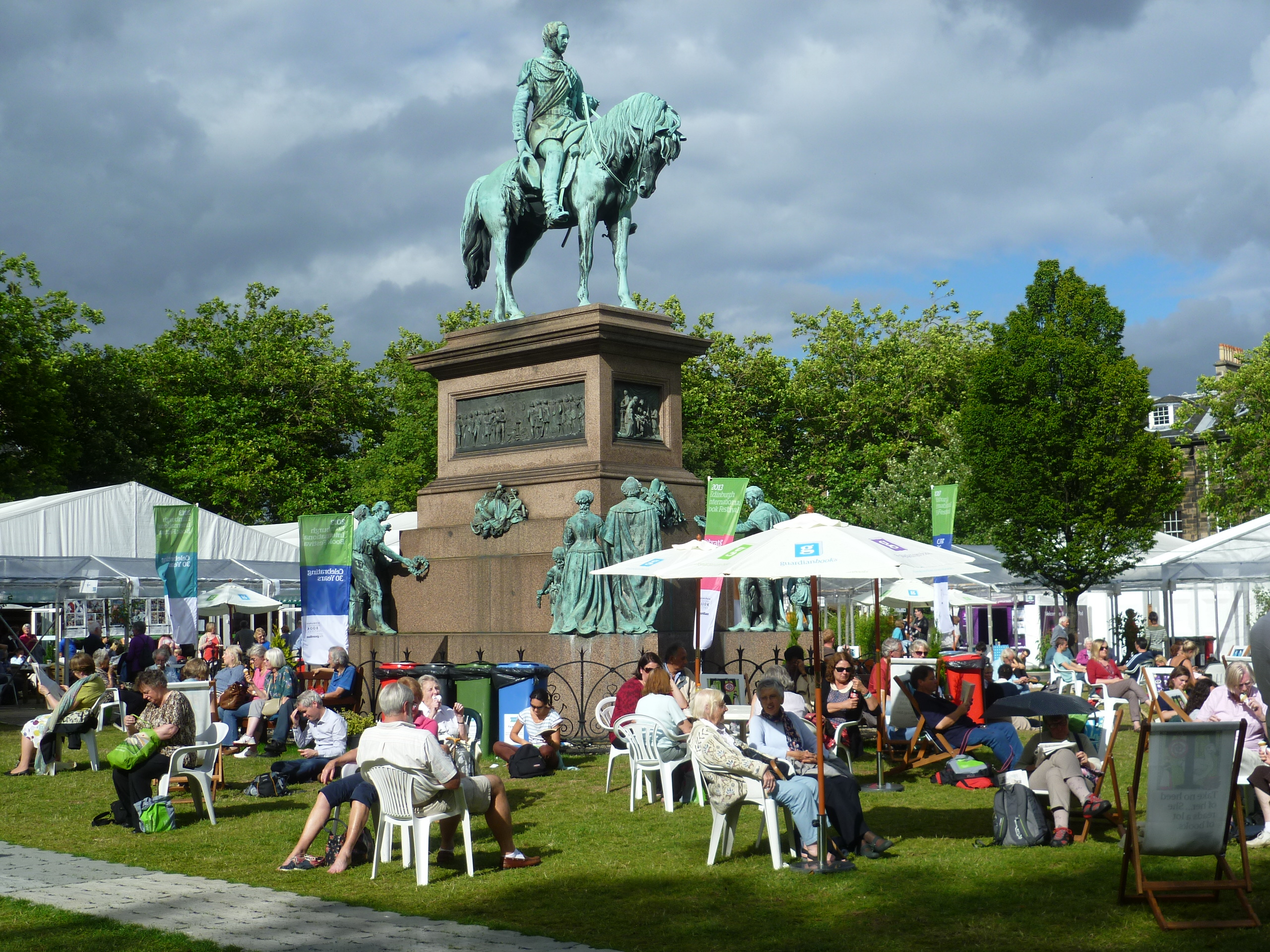
Charlotte Square during the Edinburgh International Book Festival, 2013

Until 2019, the festival was primarily held in a set of marquees in Charlotte Square Gardens, Edinburgh, at the west end of George Street. In 2017, the event and some venues expanded into George Street, partly to cope with visitor numbers but also to reduce the festival's impact on the privately owned gardens.

In 2021, the festival moved to the Edinburgh College of Art, where it stayed until 2023.

In 2024, it moved to a new permanent home at the University of Edinburgh Futures Institute on the site of the former Royal Infirmary in Lauriston Place, with some events taking place in other nearby venues.

== Fringe events ==
As with all large and successful festivals, the Book Festival has sprouted a number of fringe events over the years. In 2004 and 2006 an event called Thirsty Lunch promoted itself as a cheap, non-establishment alternative.

In 2008 there were two separate festivals running at the same time as the main Book Festival. The first was the Edinburgh Book Fringe, which held its events at the Word Power (now Lighthouse) bookshop on Nicolson Street, Edinburgh. The Book Fringe still runs as of 2023, now holding events at the nearby Argonaut and Typewronger bookshops, as well as in its original home. The second was the West Port Book Festival, which was centred on second-hand/antiquarian bookshops in the West Port area of the city. The latter ran from 2008 until 2012. Both fringe festivals provided free events and were seen as a less formal alternatives to the main festival.

== Sponsorship controversy ==
In 2023, an open letter signed by over 50 authors threatened to boycott the 2024 festival over its main sponsor, Baillie Gifford, an investment firm with "up to £5bn invested in corporations that profit from fossil fuels". This followed environmental activist Greta Thunberg pulling out of the festival over the sponsorship, accusing the firm of greenwashing by sponsoring cultural events.

In May 2024, the festival announced that it was terminating Baillie Gifford's sponsorship.

In June 2025, it was announced that Ian Rankin had agreed to become a "major sponsor" of the festival, following the withdrawal of Baillie Gifford's funding.

== See also ==
- James Tait Black Memorial Prize
- Book trade in the United Kingdom
- Books in the United Kingdom
