= St Thomas of Aquin's High School =

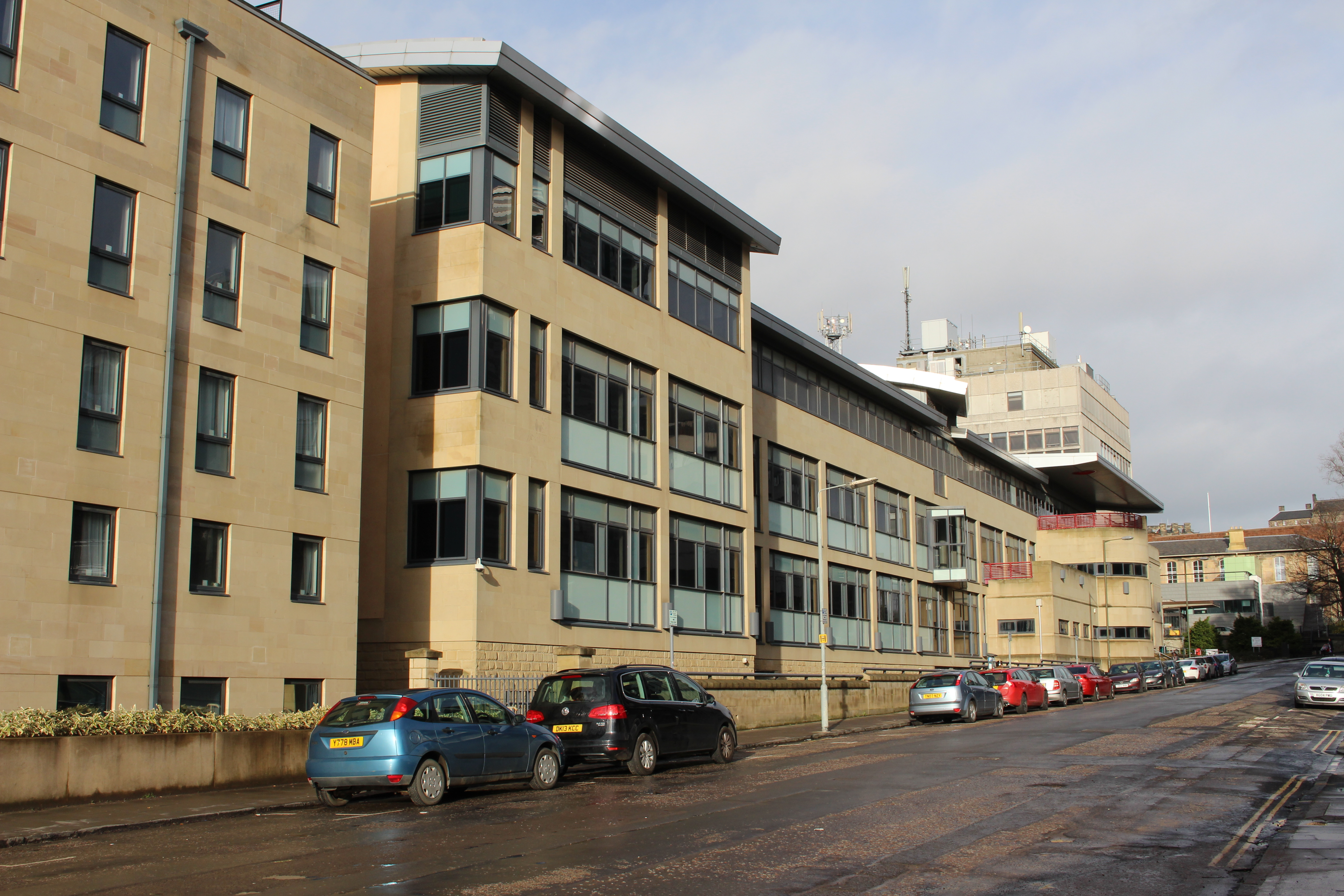

Location
- 12-20 Chalmers Street; Edinburgh, EH3 9ES; Scotland; 55.9435°N 3.1977°W

Information
- Motto: Sit Nobiscum Deus (God be with us)
- Religious affiliation: Roman Catholic
- Founder: Mother Mary Agnes
- Headteacher: Christopher Santini
- Gender: Mixed
- Age: 11 to 18
- Enrolment: 795
- Houses: St Andrew's, St Margaret's, St Patrick's
- Colours: Black, white, red
- Website: https://www.st-thomas-of-aquins.org.uk

St Thomas of Aquin's High School is a state-funded Catholic secondary school in the Lauriston area of Edinburgh.

== History ==
St Thomas of Aquin's College for the training of Catholic teachers was formally established in 1865 by the Sisters of Mercy at St Catharine's Convent on Lauriston Gardens, Edinburgh. It expanded its remit and in 1886 the all-girls St Thomas of Aquin's College was established. In 1905, the Higher Grade Department of the college, where ‘Secondary Education’ was provided, was officially recognised by the then Education Department. The college retained its 'Primary' Department until World War II. In 1975, boys were admitted and the school was given its own catchment area in the city.

The Sisters of Mercy adapted the ancient coat of arms, given to the original Order of Mercy by King James of Aragon, for the school's badge. The school motto, Sit Nobiscum Deus - God be with us, is taken from the coat of arms. The school is named after Thomas Aquinas, an influential thirteenth century philosopher and theologian. He was born near the town of Aquino, Italy. The school is affectionately known as St. Tam's.

Christopher Santini is the permanent Headteacher having been Acting Headteacher since 2016.

== Facilities ==
The school is located in the Lauriston area of Edinburgh beside the original convent. The building was upgraded in 1961. In 1997, one of the main staircases collapsed. The new 750 pupil St Thomas of Aquin's High School was opened in August 2002. It was built on the site of the old school following closure of the building in 1998 as it had become unsuitable to meet safety, security and curriculum requirements. It could also not be converted to support the integration of pupils with special needs. It was the first of Edinburgh's £133m Smart School Initiative programme to be completed. The building won the 'SCALA Civic Building of the Year Award', and a 'Designshare Award'. The building was also designed in association with the O.E.C.D. Programme for Educational Buildings, Paris.

== Academics ==
St Thomas has been ranked as one of the top twenty state secondary schools in Scotland.

== Associated Primary Schools ==
The school is associated with four local primary schools. These are:

- Holy Cross RC Primary School
- St. Mark's RC Primary School
- St. Mary's RC Primary School
- St. Peter's RC Primary School.

== Notable alumni ==
- Christophe Berra – footballer
- Greg McHugh – actor
- Barry Can't Swim – musician
