= Edinburgh Futures Institute =

Academic institute at the University of Edinburgh

Coordinates: 55°56′40″N 3°11′34″W

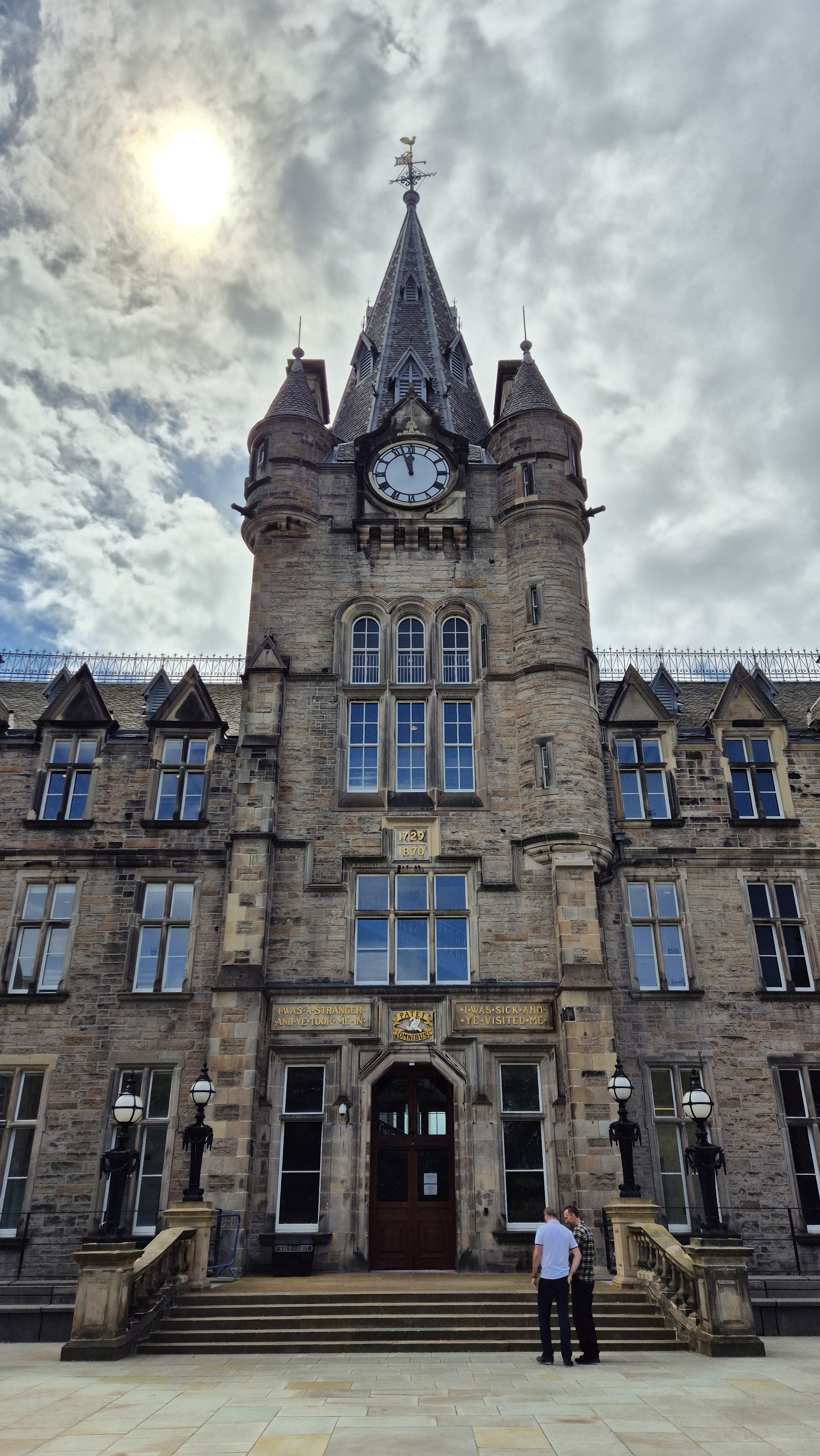
Main entrance of Edinburgh Futures Institute

The Edinburgh Futures Institute (EFI) is a department within the College of Arts, Humanities and Social Sciences at the University of Edinburgh in Scotland.

Opened in 2022, the EFI links arts, humanities, and social sciences with other disciplines in the research and teaching of complex, multi-stakeholder societal challenges and data-driven solutions. The institute offers undergraduate and postgraduate degrees in interdisciplinary subjects such as Data and Artificial Intelligence Ethics; Future Governance; and Planetary Health. The EFI is housed in the Category-A listed former Royal Infirmary of Edinburgh at Lauriston Place, at the southern edge of Edinburgh's Old Town. As of 2025, it is led by Director Marion Thain, EFI's Professor of Culture and Technology.

== History ==
Until 2003, the old Royal Infirmary of Edinburgh in Lauriston Place had been a working hospital as part of the National Health Service. In 1998, a joint project between private finance, local authorities, and the university moved the hospital to a modern medical campus in the Little France area. In 2001, parts of the vacated Royal Infirmary grounds and the buildings which had housed the medical and gynaecology wards were sold, and later developed into the Quartermile residential and commercial site.

The university purchased the remaining Royal Infirmary site, which had housed the surgical wards, in 2016. This had sat empty since 2003, when the surgical services transferred to the new Royal Infirmary in Little France. In 2018, the university signed the £1.3 billion Edinburgh and South East Scotland City Region Deal in partnership with the UK and Scottish governments, six local authorities and all universities and colleges in the region. One of the five 'innovation hubs' the initiative sought to create was a proposed Edinburgh Futures Institute intended to "tackle the world's major problems" and housed in the Royal Infirmary.

In 2017, the university received a £10 million gift from an anonymous donor for the renovation of the Royal Infirmary and creation of the EFI; it was the largest-ever capital donation to the university at the time. The university submitted large-scale renovation and extension plans by architectural firm Bennetts Associates for the site to the City of Edinburgh Council, which were approved in December 2017. Construction firm Balfour Beatty won the £70 million contract for the renovation, while the total cost of the project was believed to be about £120 million. Construction works began in early 2018 with an anticipated opening date of 2021, but the building's listed status and the COVID-19 pandemic delayed the process.

Teaching on the EFI's first postgraduate programmes began in September 2022 in other venues around the university's George Square campus. The EFI admitted its first undergraduate cohort in Interdisciplinary Futures in September 2023. The institute and its newly-restored building were formally opened to the public on 3 June 2024.

Since August 2024, the Institute has hosted the Edinburgh International Book Festival, with EFI designated as the Festival's new permanent home.

== Mission and structure ==
The EFI's mission is research and teaching on complex, multi-stakeholder societal challenges, with an emphasis on data-driven solutions. It aims to produce innovation especially in creative industries, financial services and fintech, public services, and tourism and festivals, all of which are key sectors of the Scottish economy. The EFI's researchers come from a variety of academic disciplines across the arts, humanities, social sciences, informatics, medicine, and natural sciences. Most staff members also teach in other Schools at the university, and the institute considers itself part of the wider university ecosystem in its multidisciplinary approach to research and teaching.

Organizationally, the EFI is an institute under the governance of the university's College of Arts, Humanities and Social Sciences. It is considered a 'School'—Edinburgh's terminology for a self-administering academic unit representing one or more adjacent disciplines, such as the School of Social and Political Science—despite not being named so. The EFI's first Director was legal scholar Lesley McAra, Professor of Penology. McAra was succeeded in 2022 by Chris Speed, Chair of Design Informatics. Since January 2025, EFI is led by Director Marion Thain, Professor of Culture and Technology. The institute has four further Directors of Business Engagement & Partnerships, Education, Innovation, and Research.

== Degree programmes ==
As of 2026, the EFI offers a four-year undergraduate Master of Arts degree, and several one-year postgraduate Master of Science degrees available for full-time or part-time study. In October 2026, the university announced the closure of four postgraduate programmes – in Education Futures, Future Governance, Planetary Health, and Sustainable Lands and Cities – to future entrants from 2027/28 as part of budget cuts.

=== Undergraduate ===
- MA (hons) Interdisciplinary Futures

=== Postgraduate ===
- MSc Circular Economy
- MSc Creative Industries
- MSc Cultural Heritage Futures
- MSc Data and Artificial Intelligence Ethics
- MSc Data, Inequality and Society
- MSc Future Infrastructure, Sustainability & Climate Change
- MSc Narrative Futures: Art, Data and Society
- MSc Service Management and Design

== Awards ==
The institute was named a laureate in the 2024 Prix Versailles World Architecture and Design Awards as one of the "world's most beautiful campuses", and an example of "exceptional architecture and design".

In 2026 it was one of ten winners of the annual Royal Incorporation of Architects in Scotland (RIAS) awards. The judges cited the project's "technical mastery while preserving the integrity of the historic building".

== Gallery ==
Architecture of the Edinburgh Futures Institute
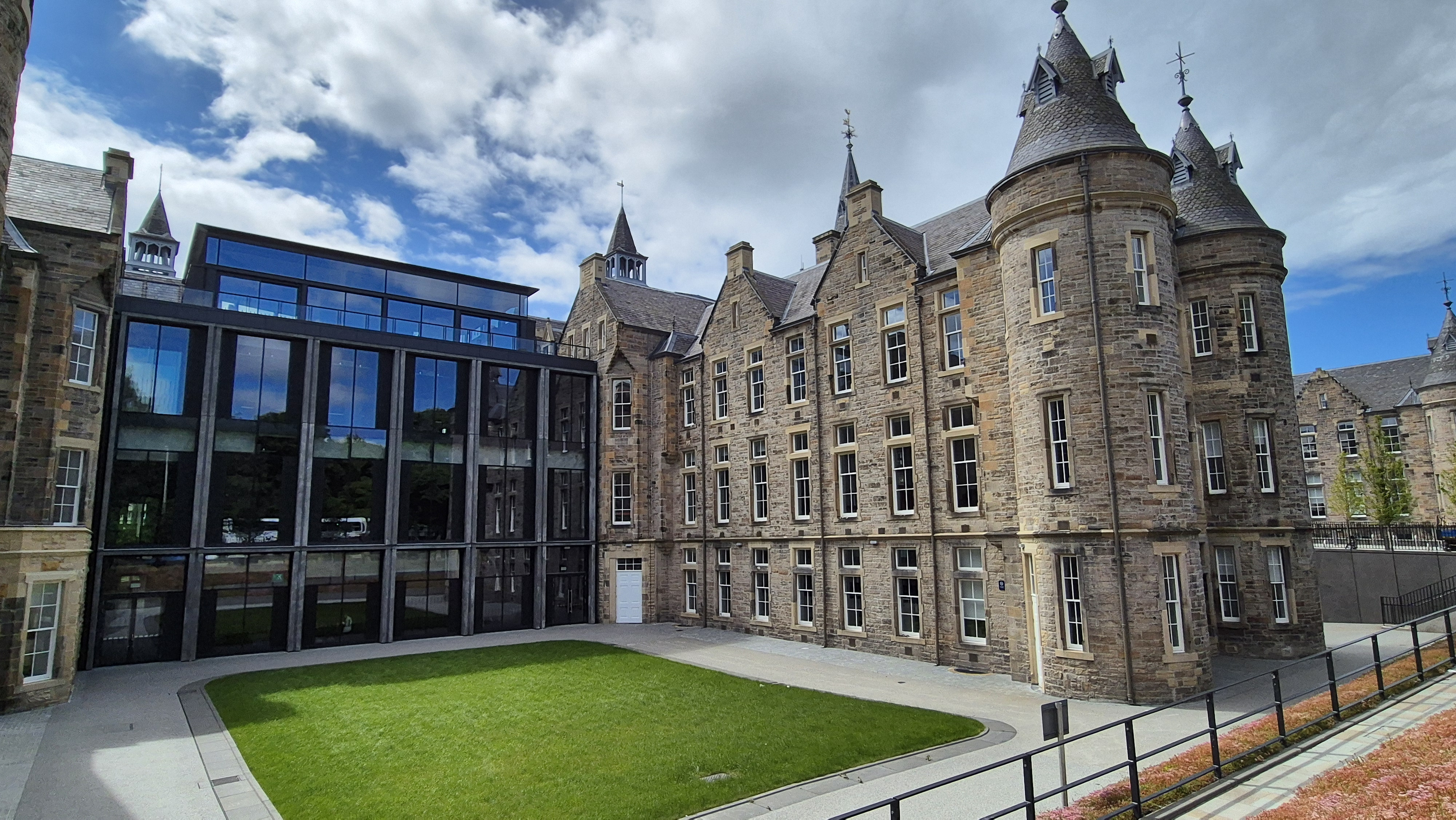
Outer courtyard, with old and new structures

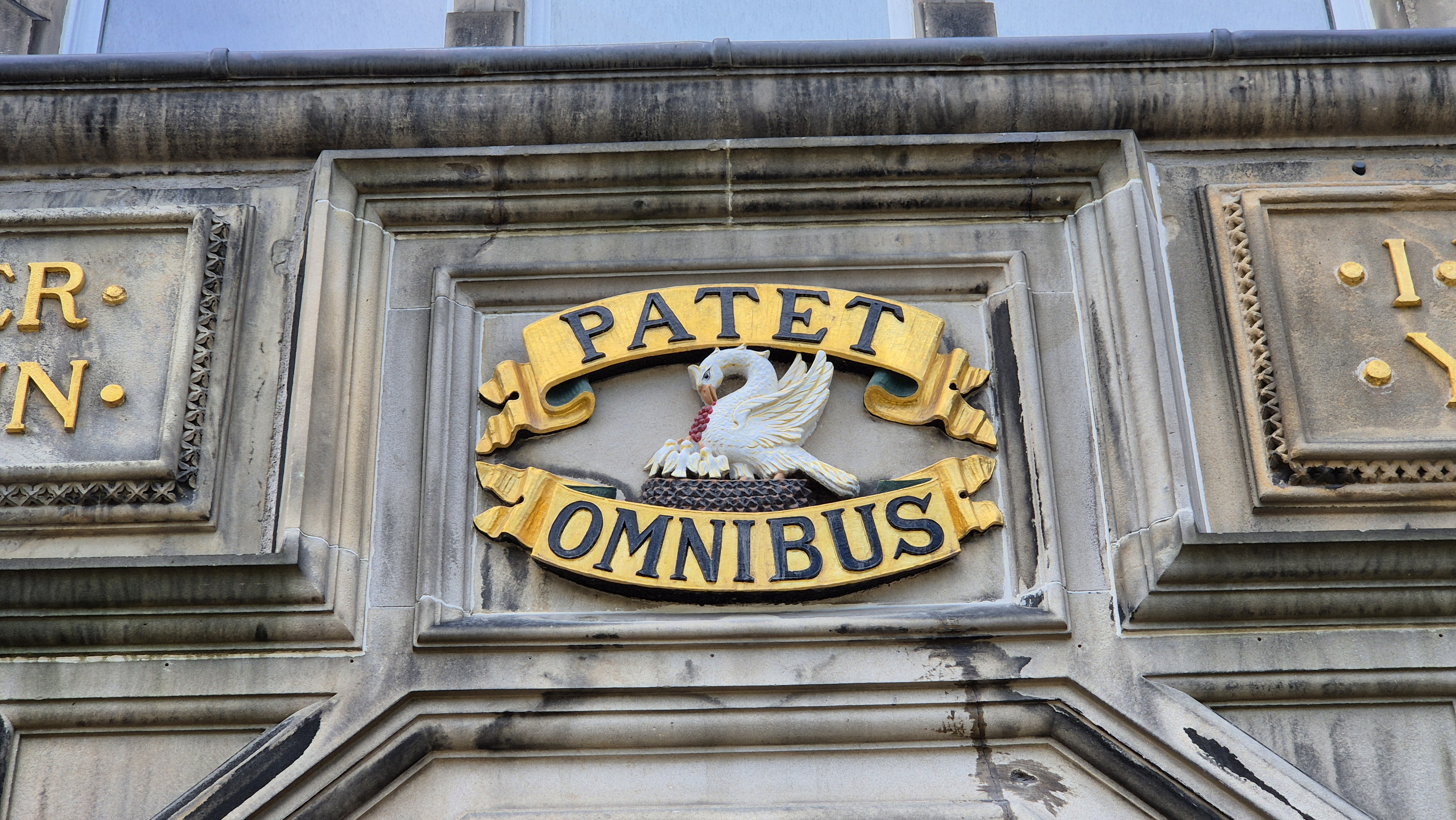
Crest with motto "Patet Omnibus" ("Open to All")

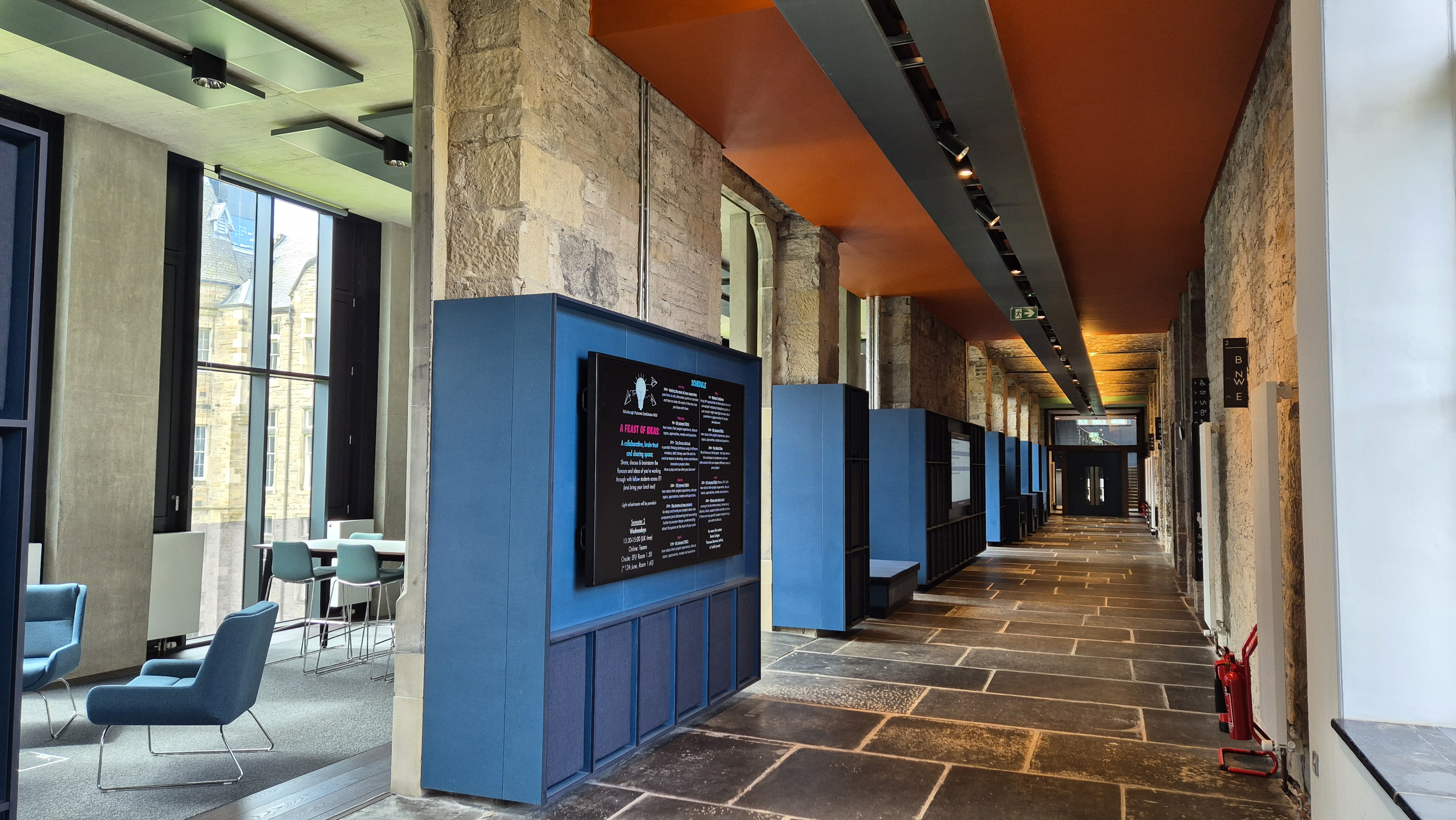
Main ground floor hallway

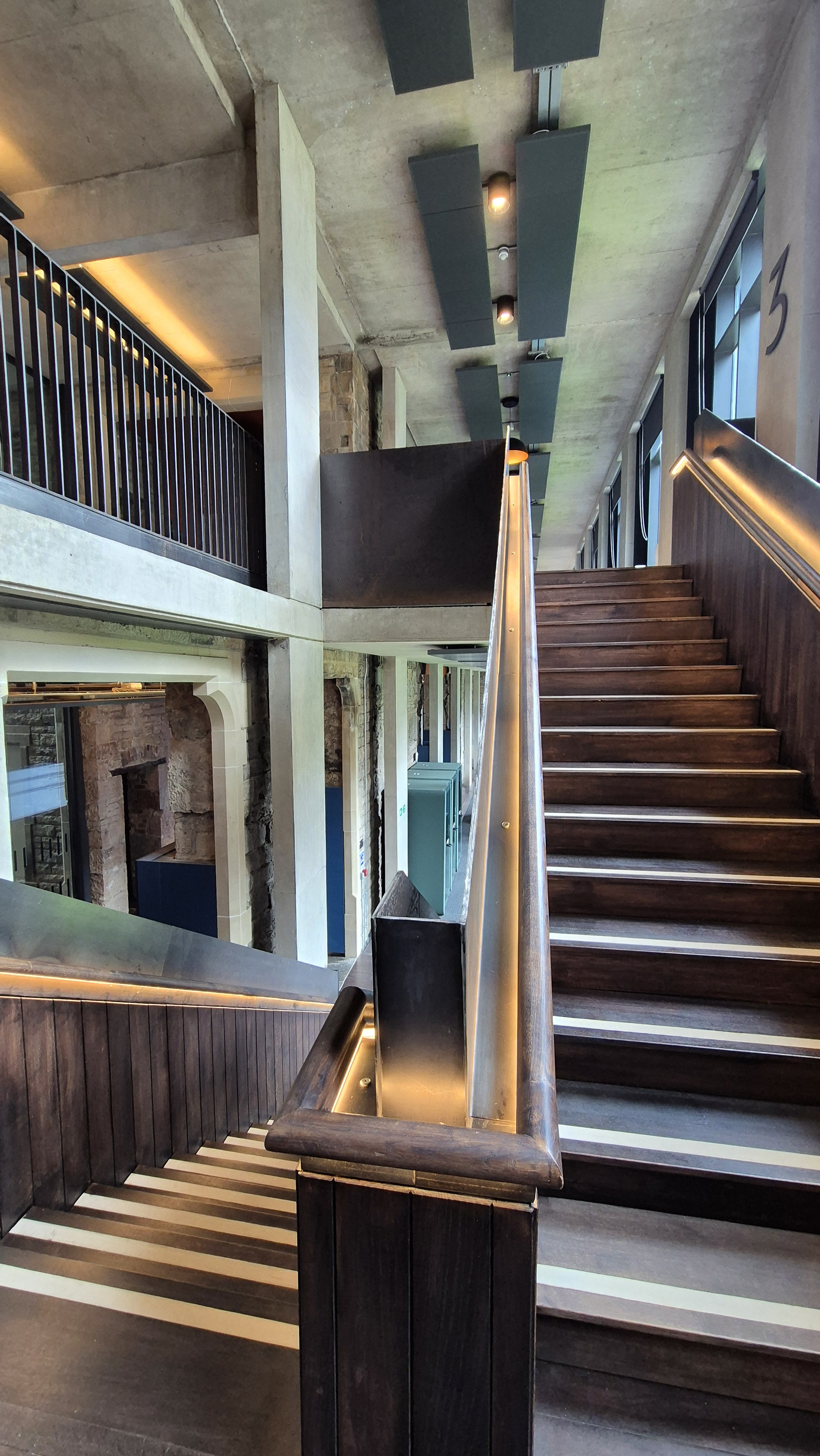
Staircase

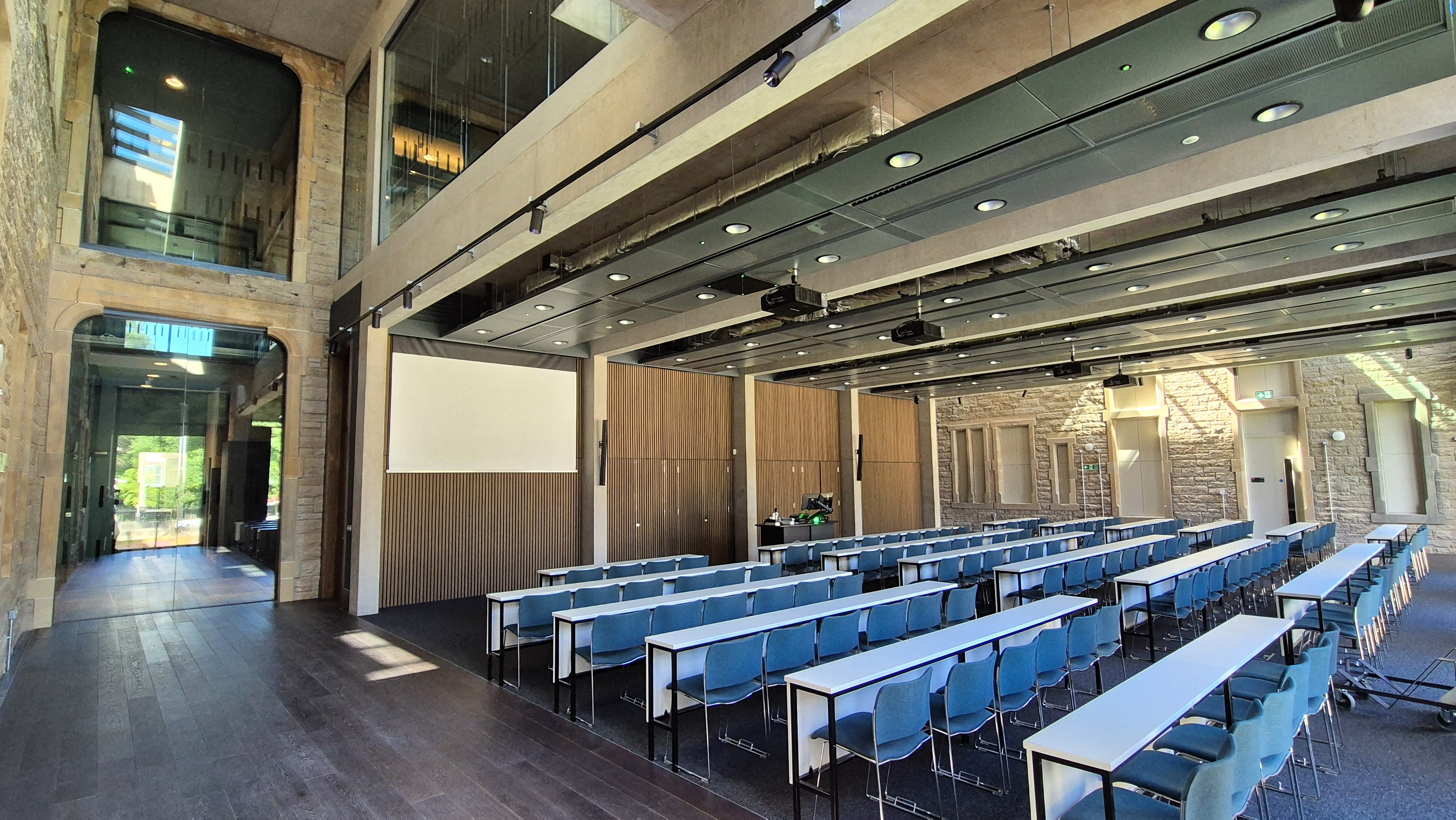
Lecture hall

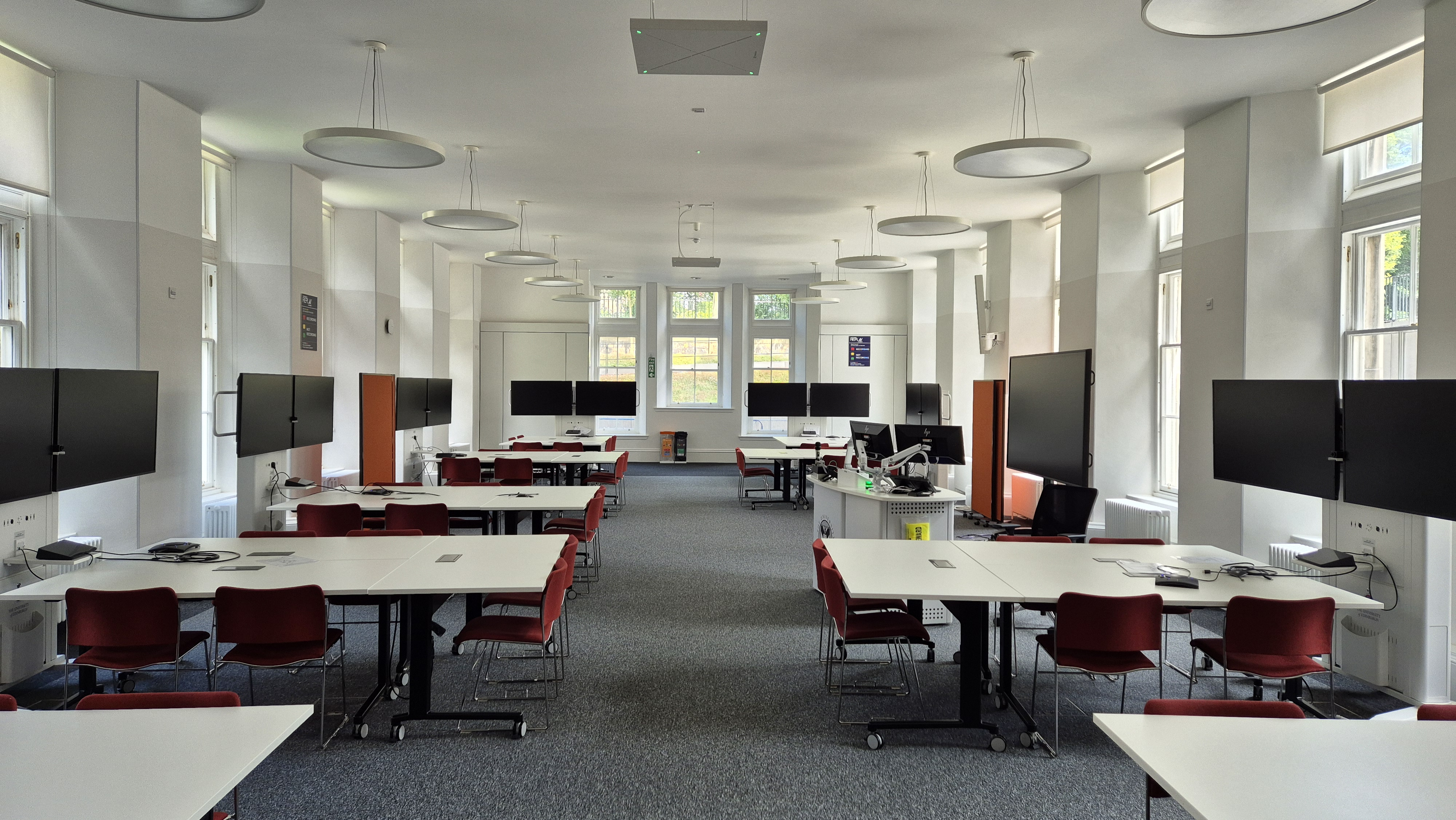
Seminar room

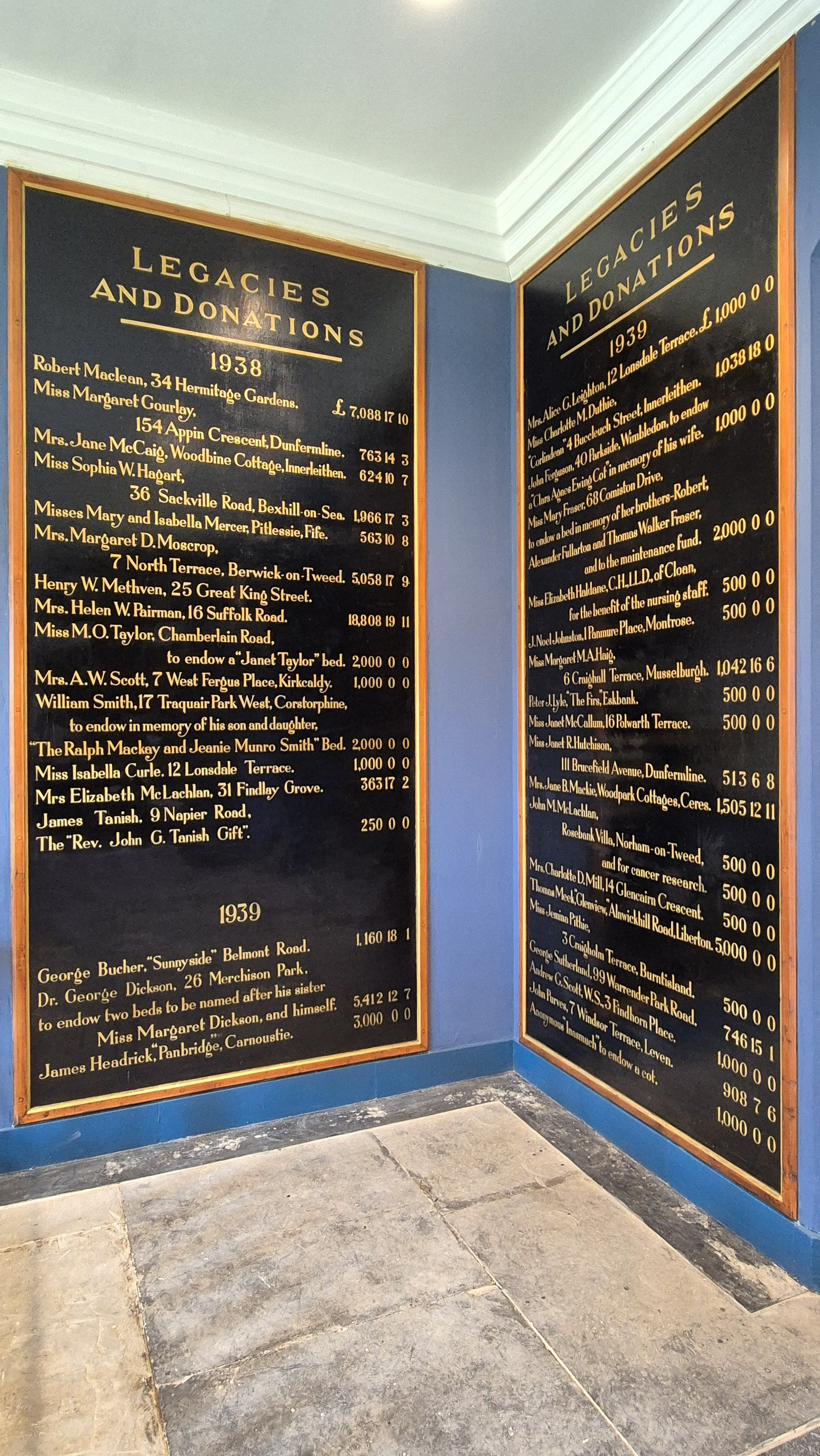
Original Royal Infirmary donations

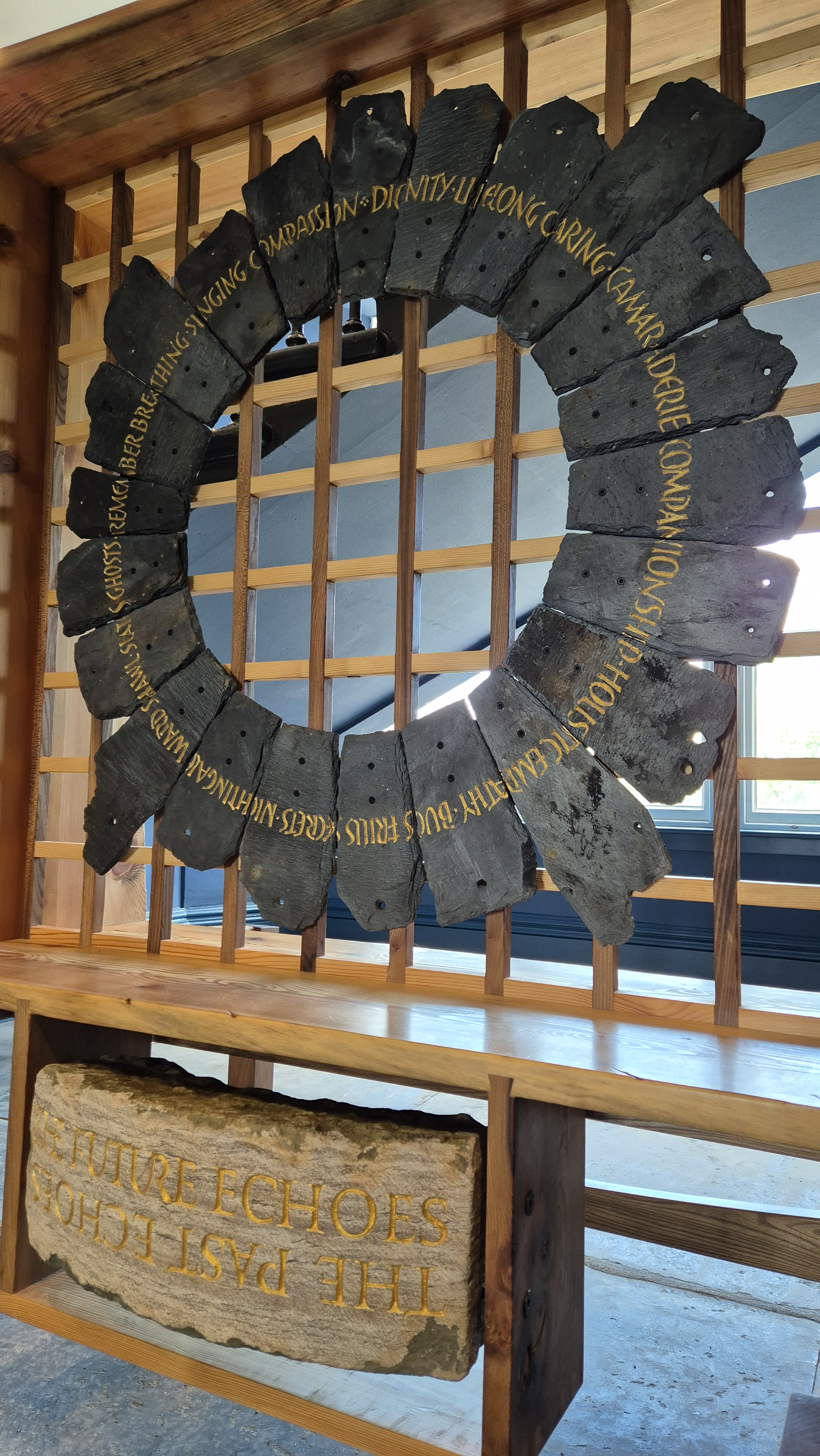
"Spirit Case", sculpture from salvaged materials
