= List of listed buildings in Edinburgh/25 =

This is a list of listed buildings in Edinburgh, Scotland.

== List ==
Name	Location	Date Listed	Grid Ref. (Note: Sometimes known as OSGB36, the grid reference (where provided) is based on the British national grid reference system used by the Ordnance Survey. • "Guide to National Grid". Ordnance Survey. • "Get-a-map". Ordnance Survey.)	Geo-coordinates	Notes	LB Number (Note: Historic Environment Scotland assign a unique alphanumeric identifier to each designated site in Scotland, for listed buildings this always begins with "LB", for example "LB12345".)	Image
3-9 (Odd Nos) Rose Street, Including The Abbotsford Bar				55°57′12″N 3°11′41″W	Category B	30151	Upload another image
4 And 5 St Andrew Square				55°57′12″N 3°11′34″W	Category B	30158	Upload Photo
Saxe-Coburg Street 13-15A				55°57′38″N 3°12′28″W	Category B	30174	Upload Photo
Slateford Road, Slateford Maltings				55°55′52″N 3°14′14″W	Category B	30184	Upload Photo
Summer Place 1-5				55°57′50″N 3°12′08″W	Category B	30185	Upload Photo
1 Waverley Park, Elsie Inglis Nursery, (Former Outpatients' Department)				55°57′18″N 3°09′58″W	Category B	30201	Upload Photo
4 Lauriston Gardens, St Catherine's Church (Roman Catholic) And Convent, Including Retaining Walls, Gatepiers And Gate				55°56′39″N 3°11′57″W	Category B	30205	Upload another image
Granton Harbour, Eastern Breakwater				55°59′10″N 3°13′04″W	Category B	30220	Upload Photo
1 - 12 Barclay Terrace (Inclusive Nos), 49 Barclay Place And 26 And 26A Wright's Houses				55°56′23″N 3°12′15″W	Category B	30065	Upload another image
1, 2, 3, Belford Road And 1-5 (Inclusive Nos) Bells Brae, Former Drumsheugh Toll				55°57′08″N 3°12′56″W	Category B	30066	Upload another image
32, 32A, 32B And 32C Broughton Street				55°57′28″N 3°11′23″W	Category B	30069	Upload Photo
32 Cockburn Street				55°57′02″N 3°11′22″W	Category B	30089	Upload Photo
52-56 (Even Nos) Cockburn Street				55°57′01″N 3°11′19″W	Category B	30094	Upload another image
94 And 94A George Street And 82 Rose Street Lane North				55°57′08″N 3°12′08″W	Category B	30109	Upload Photo
96 Grassmarket				55°56′53″N 3°11′42″W	Category C(S)	30114	Upload Photo
Hamilton Place 28, 34				55°57′30″N 3°12′28″W	Category B	30115	Upload Photo
106-110 (Even Nos) Lauriston Place, Including Railings				55°56′41″N 3°12′02″W	Category B	30124	Upload Photo
8 And 8A York Place, Including Railings				55°57′22″N 3°11′33″W	Category A	29977	Upload Photo
16 York Place, Including Railings				55°57′23″N 3°11′30″W	Category A	29981	Upload Photo
20 York Place, Including Railings And Lamps				55°57′23″N 3°11′29″W	Category A	29983	Upload Photo
St Bernard's Davidson Church Henderson Row				55°57′35″N 3°12′18″W	Category B	30016	Upload Photo
55 Lauriston Place, Chalmers Hospital, Including Boundary Wall, Railings And Lodge				55°56′40″N 3°11′54″W	Category B	30022	Upload another image
Bank Street (Corner Market Street), Black Watch (South African War) Memorial				55°57′00″N 3°11′40″W	Category A	30034	Upload another image
26 Viewforth, Boroughmuir High School, Including Boundary Walls, Gatepiers, Gates And Railings				55°56′18″N 3°12′32″W	Category B	30040	Upload another image
98-102 (Even Nos) West Bow				55°56′54″N 3°11′40″W	Category B	29909	Upload Photo
4 And 4A West Coates, Including Boundary Walls, Gatepiers And Obelisk				55°56′46″N 3°13′45″W	Category B	29920	Upload Photo
24-26 (Inclusive Nos) West Harbour Road				55°58′55″N 3°13′46″W	Category C(S)	29926	Upload Photo
51 York Place, Including Railings				55°57′22″N 3°11′20″W	Category A	29970	Upload Photo
66 East Trinity Road, Mary Cottage, With Boundary Wall, Railings And Gates				55°58′33″N 3°12′13″W	Category B	29859	Upload Photo
18 And 19 Union Place				55°57′26″N 3°11′09″W	Category B	29860	Upload Photo
4-10 (Even Nos) Union Street				55°57′27″N 3°11′09″W	Category B	29864	Upload Photo
4 Upper Bow				55°56′56″N 3°11′38″W	Category C(S)	29866	Upload another image
11, 13, 15 Walker Street				55°56′58″N 3°12′47″W	Category A	29879	Upload another image
20-24A (Even Nos) Scotland Street, Including Railings				55°57′36″N 3°11′44″W	Category B	29783	Upload Photo
9, 10, 11 South College Street				55°56′49″N 3°11′12″W	Category B	29799	Upload another image
17 Spring Gardens, St Ann's Bank House, Including Boundary Wall And Gatepiers				55°57′19″N 3°09′50″W	Category B	29801	Upload Photo
1 Spylaw Bank Road With Boundary Wall				55°54′31″N 3°15′24″W	Category C(S)	29817	Upload Photo
51 Spylaw Street With Boundary Wall				55°54′28″N 3°15′23″W	Category C(S)	29827	Upload Photo
2-18 (Even Nos) St Stephen Street, And 23, 24 North West Circus Place, Including Railings				55°57′27″N 3°12′26″W	Category B	29747	Upload Photo
23-29 (Odd Nos) Salisbury Road, Including Boundary Walls And Gatepiers				55°56′18″N 3°10′32″W	Category B	29755	Upload Photo
Saxe Coburg Street 8-12				55°57′38″N 3°12′27″W	Category B	29770	Upload Photo
12 Dean Bank Lane And Saxe Coburg Street, Deanbank House With Boundary Wall				55°57′36″N 3°12′29″W	Category B	29771	Upload Photo
30 And 31 Rutland Square, Including Railings And Lamp Standards				55°56′57″N 3°12′33″W	Category A	29691	Upload Photo
25 St Andrew Square With Railings				55°57′18″N 3°11′37″W	Category B	29702	Upload Photo
38 And 39 St Andrew Square, Bank Of Scotland With Lamp Standards				55°57′15″N 3°11′30″W	Category A	29707	Upload another image
St Bernard's Row 18				55°57′34″N 3°12′39″W	Category B	29721	Upload Photo
1, 2 Rothesay Terrace				55°57′05″N 3°12′59″W	Category B	29667	Upload Photo
17, 18 Rothesay Terrace				55°57′01″N 3°13′08″W	Category C(S)	29672	Upload Photo
1 And 3 Roxburgh Place, Including Railings				55°56′50″N 3°11′05″W	Category B	29674	Upload Photo
62 Restalrig Road South, Restalrig				55°57′28″N 3°08′56″W	Category B	29627	Upload Photo
152 And 154 Rose Street, Kenilworth Bar, And 112-114 (Even Nos) Rose Street Lane South				55°57′06″N 3°12′08″W	Category A	29651	Upload another image
190-192 (Even Nos) Rose Street And Rose Street South Lane Edc Cleansing Store				55°57′05″N 3°12′17″W	Category B	29653	Upload Photo
49, 49A, 50 And 50A Queen Street				55°57′14″N 3°12′10″W	Category A	29559	Upload Photo
52 And 53 Queen Street With Railings				55°57′14″N 3°12′11″W	Category A	29561	Upload Photo
19-25 (Odd Numbers) Raeburn Place				55°57′32″N 3°12′40″W	Category C(S)	29580	Upload Photo
11 And 12 Ramsay Garden				55°56′57″N 3°11′49″W	Category A	29595	Upload Photo
49 Northumberland Street				55°57′24″N 3°12′01″W	Category A	29480	Upload Photo
4 Pentland Road With Boundary Wall				55°54′31″N 3°15′54″W	Category B	29487	Upload Photo
3 Pier Place And 1 Lamb's Court				55°58′51″N 3°11′43″W	Category B	29490	Upload Photo
1 Pilrig Place And 2-6 (Even Nos) Pilrig Street				55°57′49″N 3°10′43″W	Category A	29493	Upload Photo
127 And 128 Princes Street				55°57′03″N 3°12′17″W	Category B	29515	Upload Photo
West Princes Street Gardens, The Cottage				55°57′05″N 3°11′50″W	Category C(S)	29525	Upload another image See more images
Quality Street 29, 31 Davidson's Mains, Woodside Cottage				55°57′51″N 3°16′25″W	Category B	29529	Upload Photo
22 Queen Street With Railings And Garaging To Lane				55°57′17″N 3°11′56″W	Category A	29544	Upload Photo
Nicolson Street West 17-19				55°56′42″N 3°11′07″W	Category B	29434	Upload Photo
Nicolson Street West 18-22 With Archway At Site Formerly Gray's Court, Former Southern Market Buildings And Old Market Bar				55°56′41″N 3°11′05″W	Category B	29438	Upload Photo
Old Church Lane, Glen Arthur, Duddingston				55°56′30″N 3°08′48″W	Category B	29463	Upload Photo
5 And 7 Nelson Street, Including Railings And Lamp				55°57′25″N 3°11′45″W	Category A	29384	Upload Photo
15, 17 And 17A Nelson Street, And 6-7A Northumberland Place, Including Railings And Lamps				55°57′26″N 3°11′46″W	Category A	29386	Upload Photo
12-14 (Inclusive Nos) Nicolson Square, University Of Edinburgh, Alison House Including Railings				55°56′46″N 3°11′11″W	Category B	29414	Upload Photo
Nicolson Street 104				55°56′41″N 3°11′01″W	Category B	29425	Upload Photo
16, 17 And 18 Minto Street, Including Boundary Walls And Pedestrian Gate				55°56′07″N 3°10′31″W	Category B	29348	Upload Photo
32 And 33 Minto Street, Including Boundary Walls And Pedestrian Gate				55°56′03″N 3°10′31″W	Category B	29355	Upload Photo
34 Minto Street, Including Boundary Walls And Pedestrian Gate				55°56′04″N 3°10′31″W	Category B	29356	Upload Photo
35 And 36 Minto Street, Including Pedestrian Gate And Boundary Walls				55°56′07″N 3°10′34″W	Category B	29357	Upload Photo
Montague Street, 7 - 57 And 75-79 St Leonard's Street				55°56′33″N 3°10′46″W	Category B	29366	Upload Photo
6-8 (Even Nos) Morrison Street And 112-116 (Even Nos) Lothian Road				55°56′46″N 3°12′21″W	Category C(S)	29375	Upload Photo
1, 1A And 3 Middleby Street, Including Boundary Walls And Pedestrian Gate				55°56′06″N 3°10′33″W	Category B	29331	Upload Photo
9A And B Middleby Street, Including Boundary Walls And Pedestrian Gate				55°56′05″N 3°10′35″W	Category B	29333	Upload Photo
1 Minto Street, Including Boundary Walls				55°56′14″N 3°10′39″W	Category C(S)	29336	Upload Photo
9 Minto Street Including Boundary Walls, Piers, And Pedestrian Gates				55°56′11″N 3°10′35″W	Category B	29342	Upload Photo
10 Minto Street, Including Boundary Walls And Pedestrian Gate				55°56′10″N 3°10′35″W	Category C(S)	29343	Upload Photo
Marshall Street 14-20 (Even Nos)				55°56′44″N 3°11′11″W	Category B	29305	Upload Photo
37-45 (Odd Nos) Lothian Road				55°56′53″N 3°12′22″W	Category C(S)	29264	Upload Photo
105-117 (Odd Nos) Lothian Road				55°56′46″N 3°12′18″W	Category C(S)	29269	Upload Photo
119-123 (Odd Nos) Lothian Road And 5 Bread Street				55°56′46″N 3°12′18″W	Category B	29270	Upload Photo
14-20 (Even Nos) Keir Street, Including Boundary Wall And Railings				55°56′44″N 3°11′50″W	Category B	29199	Upload Photo
Lanark Road, 502 Mount Pleasant, Juniper Green				55°54′17″N 3°16′57″W	Category C(S)	29208	Upload Photo
435 Lawnmarket, Including Deacon Brodie's Tavern And Part Of 451 Lawnmarket To Rear				55°56′59″N 3°11′35″W	Category A	29227	Upload another image
475-479 (Odd Nos) Lawnmarket				55°56′58″N 3°11′37″W	Category B	29232	Upload Photo
491-495 (Odd Nos) Lawnmarket, And 3 And 5 James Court				55°56′58″N 3°11′38″W	Category A	29234	Upload Photo
23-27A (Odd Nos) India Street, Including Railings And Lamps				55°57′21″N 3°12′20″W	Category A	29130	Upload Photo
16 India Street, Including Railings				55°57′19″N 3°12′22″W	Category A	29134	Upload Photo
1-5 (Odd Nos) Gloucester Place And 44 India Street, Including Railings And Lamps				55°57′23″N 3°12′24″W	Category A	29141	Upload Photo
Inverleith Place, 21-25				55°58′04″N 3°12′30″W	Category B	29149	Upload Photo
Inverleith Row 46, 47				55°58′10″N 3°12′28″W	Category C(S)	29179	Upload Photo
39, 41 Jeffrey Street, Lauder House, Including Boundary Wall				55°57′04″N 3°11′08″W	Category B	29190	Upload Photo
12 Hill Square Including Wall And Railings				55°56′48″N 3°11′01″W	Category B	29079	Upload Photo
21 And 23 Hill Street				55°57′12″N 3°12′11″W	Category A	29082	Upload Photo
11-37 (Odd Nos) Holyrood Road, University Of Edinburgh, Moray House, Paterson's Land				55°57′00″N 3°10′46″W	Category B	29090	Upload another image
160 Canongate And Sugarhouse Close, Former Holyrood Brewery Including Malt Barn, Kilns, Brewhouse, Offices And Boundary Wall				55°57′01″N 3°10′45″W	Category C(S)	29091	Upload Photo
6-10 (Even Nos) Hope Street				55°57′02″N 3°12′31″W	Category A	29093	Upload Photo
9 And 9A Howe Street, Including Railings				55°57′21″N 3°12′06″W	Category B	29108	Upload Photo
15 And 17 Howe Street, Including Railings				55°57′22″N 3°12′06″W	Category B	29110	Upload Photo
4-10 (Even Nos) Howe Street, Including Railings				55°57′21″N 3°12′08″W	Category B	29115	Upload Photo
26 Howe Street				55°57′23″N 3°12′10″W	Category B	29119	Upload Photo
High Street, 3 And 5 Old Fishmarket Close				55°56′58″N 3°11′22″W	Category B	29041	Upload Photo
44 And 46 High Street				55°57′01″N 3°11′08″W	Category B	29065	Upload Photo
156-166 (Even Nos) High Street				55°56′59″N 3°11′20″W	Category B	29071	Upload Photo
168-184 (Even Nos) High Street				55°56′59″N 3°11′22″W	Category B	29072	Upload another image
4 And 6 Grove Street, Including Railings				55°56′45″N 3°12′47″W	Category B	28981	Upload Photo
29-33 (Odd Nos) Hanover Street				55°57′10″N 3°11′48″W	Category B	28997	Upload Photo
14-18 (Even Nos) Hanover Street				55°57′09″N 3°11′49″W	Category B	29005	Upload Photo
3, 5 And 7 Grassmarket				55°56′49″N 3°11′54″W	Category B	28933	Upload another image
8 And 8A South Gray Street, Including Gatepiers And Boundary Walls				55°56′02″N 3°10′36″W	Category B	28948	Upload Photo
1 Upper Gray Street And 21 Salisbury Place, Including Boundary Walls And Pedestrian Gate				55°56′13″N 3°10′45″W	Category B	28950	Upload Photo
6-11 (Inclusive Nos) Glenfinlas Street, Including Railings And Lamps				55°57′10″N 3°12′35″W	Category A	28922	Upload Photo
69 And 69A George Street				55°57′12″N 3°12′01″W	Category A	28844	Upload another image
115 George Street With Railings				55°57′09″N 3°12′16″W	Category A	28854	Upload Photo
117 To 121 George Street, Church Of Scotland Offices				55°57′10″N 3°12′17″W	Category A	28855	Upload another image
135 George Street				55°57′08″N 3°12′22″W	Category B	28859	Upload Photo
60 And 60A George Street				55°57′11″N 3°11′58″W	Category B	28872	Upload Photo
84 George Street, Northern Lighthouse Board, With Railings				55°57′09″N 3°12′06″W	Category A	28877	Upload Photo
86 And 86A George Street				55°57′09″N 3°12′07″W	Category B	28879	Upload Photo
12 And 12A Forth Street				55°57′29″N 3°11′16″W	Category B	28775	Upload Photo
57-61 (Odd Nos) Frederick Street With Railings				55°57′15″N 3°12′03″W	Category B	28787	Upload Photo
40 And 42 Frederick Street, Victoria Chambers				55°57′12″N 3°12′04″W	Category B	28793	Upload Photo
44-46 (Even Nos) Frederick Street				55°57′12″N 3°12′04″W	Category B	28794	Upload Photo
1-4 (Inclusive Nos) Forrest Hill				55°56′46″N 3°11′30″W	Category B	28771	Upload another image
4 Dublin Street, Including Railings				55°57′21″N 3°11′37″W	Category A	28688	Upload Photo
40-46 (Even Nos) Dublin Street, Including Railings				55°57′27″N 3°11′39″W	Category B	28694	Upload Photo
Deanhaugh Street 2-10 And 1 And 1A Dean Terrace				55°57′29″N 3°12′34″W	Category A	28650	Upload Photo
Craiglockhart Park 1 Dunderach				55°55′01″N 3°14′31″W	Category B	28602	Upload Photo
15 And 17 Cockburn Street				55°57′03″N 3°11′26″W	Category B	28573	Upload Photo
25 Cockburn Street				55°57′03″N 3°11′25″W	Category B	28576	Upload Photo
17-39 (Odd Nos) Cowgate				55°56′53″N 3°11′34″W	Category C(S)	28594	Upload Photo
Clarence Street 28-32 And 91-93 St Stephen Street				55°57′31″N 3°12′20″W	Category B	28542	Upload Photo
45 Claremont Road, Claremont House, With Garage Outbuilding, Boundary Wall, Gatepiers And Lamp Bracket				55°58′04″N 3°09′20″W	Category B	28543	Upload Photo
Clerk Street South 76-84				55°56′23″N 3°10′49″W	Category C(S)	28557	Upload Photo
30-32 (Inclusive Nos) North West Circus Place, Including Railings				55°57′26″N 3°12′27″W	Category B	28522	Upload Photo
53-63 (Odd Nos) Canongate, Whitefoord House And Callander House (Scottish Veteran's Residence) Including Hall, Lodges At 142 And 144 Calton Road, Tenements At 57, 59 & 61 Canongate, Boundary Walls, Gatepiers And Gates				55°57′10″N 3°10′36″W	Category B	28428	Upload another image
95 Canongate, Reid's Court, Canongate Manse Including Boundary Walls And Gatepiers				55°57′08″N 3°10′39″W	Category A	28429	Upload another image
115 Canongate, Panmure House (Little Lochend Close) Including Boundary Walls				55°57′08″N 3°10′42″W	Category A	28431	Upload Photo
140 Canongate, Acheson House				55°57′04″N 3°10′45″W	Category A	28446	Upload another image See more images
6 And 8 Castle Street				55°57′05″N 3°12′12″W	Category B	28470	Upload Photo
13 Castle Terrace And 1 Cambridge Street, Including Boundary Wall And Railings				55°56′53″N 3°12′18″W	Category B	28484	Upload another image
46 Bruntsfield Place Including Boundary Walls				55°56′21″N 3°12′19″W	Category B	28375	Upload another image
Buccleuch Place 12, 13				55°56′33″N 3°11′11″W	Category B	28385	Upload Photo
Buccleuch Place 17-19				55°56′33″N 3°11′14″W	Category A	28387	Upload another image
73-77 Buccleuch Street				55°56′33″N 3°11′03″W	Category C(S)	28394	Upload Photo

== Key ==
The scheme for classifying buildings in Scotland is:

- Category A: "buildings of national or international importance, either architectural or historic; or fine, little-altered examples of some particular period, style or building type."
- Category B: "buildings of regional or more than local importance; or major examples of some particular period, style or building type, which may have been altered."
- Category C: "buildings of local importance; lesser examples of any period, style, or building type, as originally constructed or moderately altered; and simple traditional buildings which group well with other listed buildings."

In March 2016 there were 47,288 listed buildings in Scotland. Of these, 8% were Category A, and 50% were Category B, with the remaining 42% being Category C.

== See also ==
- List of listed buildings in Edinburgh
