= Teresa Helena Higginson =

British Roman Catholic mystic

Servant of God Teresa Helena Higginson
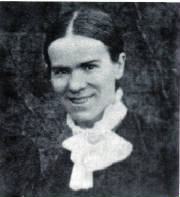
- Photograph of Teresa Helena Higginson
- Born: 27 May 1844; Holywell, Flintshire, Wales
- Died: 15 February 1905 (aged 60); Chudleigh, Devon, England

Teresa Helena Higginson (27 May 1844 – 15 February 1905) was a British Roman Catholic mystic.

== Biography ==
Higginson was born on 27 May 1844 in Holywell, Flintshire, the third of eight children. Her father, Robert Francis Higginson and her mother Mary Bowness had travelled there from Gainsborough, Lincolnshire to visit the shrine at St Winefride's Well. There, she was baptised and named after Teresa of Ávila and Helena, mother of Constantine I. The family were staunchly catholic and built a chapel for the community in their home.

Higginson attended a convent school in Nottingham between the years 1854 and 1865, then moved with her family to St Helens, where her family struggled to make ends meet. In 1871, she began her journey into teaching, training in Orrell, Greater Manchester before taking a teaching role in Wigan for three years. She would take on other teaching roles, including one in Bootle from 1879 to 1887. Between 1887 and 1899, she spent time with the nuns at St Catharine's Convent, Edinburgh, before returning to teaching in Chudleigh in 1903.

Higginson suffered a stroke in December 1904, and died on 15 February 1905 in her cottage in Chudleigh. She was discussed as a possible candidate for beatification in 1928 and a petition in favour was signed by "nearly 200,000 people in every country of the world except Russia" but she was finally declared a Servant of God in 1937. Pope Pius X remarked that "she was a special child of God" Many letters written by Higginson are in the archives at St Augustine's Abbey, Ramsgate, with duplicates at the Metropolitan Cathedral of Christ the King Liverpool.

== Life as a mystic ==
From the age of 3, Higginson was said to imitate Mary, mother of Jesus. At convent school, she spent much of her time in prayer. While living with other teachers in Wigan, she was said to be subject to supernatural phenomena, such as being thrown from her bed or her body becoming rigid in "fits of ecstasy", and "minor miracles" such as "the sudden appearance of a bar of soap on a table".

It was during this time, on Good Friday 1874, that Higginson's hands and feet bled in a manner of stigmata for the first time, something that would occur regularly over the following years. She went into prayer trances that lasted days, and she "violently re-enacted" the scenes in the Stations of the Cross.

Higginson's exploits, which included periods where "the devil impersonated [her] to deceive people" meant that she was evicted by her landlady and found it difficult to find work. Indeed, she lost a role at one school for "apparent poltergeist phenomena" and was later accused of theft" On 24 October 1887, she experience the "mystical marriage" in Clitheroe, and then travelled to St Catharine's Convent, Edinburgh.
