= Late Night Tales Presents After Dark: Vespertine =

Compilation album by Bill Brewster
- Released: August 4, 2023
- Genre: Balearic; deep house; downtempo; jazz-funk; nu-disco; pop rock
- Length: 79:20 (2×LP); 73:53 (CD)
- Label: Night Time Stories
- Producer: Bill Brewster

Late Night Tales chronology
Late Night Tales Presents Version Excursion (2021)	Late Night Tales Presents After Dark: Vespertine (2023)	Late Night Tales: Barry Can't Swim (2026)

Late Night Present After Dark: Vespertine is a DJ mix album by Bill Brewster for Late Night Tales. The fourth installment of the After Dark spinoff series, it was released by Night Time Stories on 4 August 2023. Like previous After Dark selections, Vespertine focuses on downtempo tracks, either previously unreleased or obscure, hard-to-find rarities. It features artists such as Khruangbin (remixed by Brewster with Ray Mang as Mang Dynasty), Gilbert O'Sullivan, Jeb Loy Nichols (remixed by Brewster with Alex Tepper as Hotel Motel), and Chaz Jankel.

The album was released as an unmixed 12-track double vinyl LP and a mixed 19-track CD, with different tracklists, and both mixed and unmixed versions for streaming and digital download. Brewster played a live DJ set at Phonica Records in London on 17 August 2023 as promotion for the album.

== Background ==
According to Brewster, the concept of the album was "a basement, a red light and a sound system. Or, as the Beastie's [sic] once rapped, slow and low, that is the tempo", with none of the tracks exceeding 115 bpm. In an interview for Juno Records, Brewster noted that the compilation was first discussed with Night Time Stories in 2018, but was derailed by the COVID-19 pandemic.

Two tracks were made available as a single ahead of the album's release: "So What" by Gilbert O'Sullivan, edited by Nail (Neil Tolliday of DiY Sound System and Bent), and "1998" by Fernando.

== Track listing ==
=== Unmixed double LP version ===
Side one
No.	Title	Artist	Length
1.	"Idle Hours"	Island Band	4:55
2.	"Manon Manon"	Chaz Jankel	4:56
3.	"So What (Nail Edit)"	Gilbert O'Sullivan	8:44

Side two
No.	Title	Artist	Length
1.	"Kills And Kisses (Scorpio Twins Remix)"	Rheinzand	8:10
2.	"Le Chiffre"	Canada High	5:02
3.	"Burning Up"	Lanowa	6:38

Side three
No.	Title	Artist	Length
1.	"So We Won't Forget (Mang Dynasty Irreverent Dub)"	Khruangbin	7:16
2.	"1998"	Fernando	7:00
3.	"Code Of Love"	Debbe & The Code	6:02

Side four
No.	Title	Artist	Length
1.	"Nijána"	Jana Koubková	6:15
2.	"Open Space"	IPG v Hot Toddy	7:32
3.	"Hey Dreamer"	Smashed Atoms & Backdoor Man	6:50

=== Mixed CD/digital version ===
No.	Title	Artist	Length
1.	"Infinite Consciousness"	T.O.E	8:56
2.	"Idle Hours"	Island Band	4:45
3.	"Nijána"	Jana Koubková	6:15
4.	"Come Home"	Dan Wainwright	6:38
5.	"Don't Drop Me (Hotel Motel Remix)"	Jeb Loy Nichols	9:12
6.	"Drum Lock"	Nick Munday	7:07
7.	"So We Won't Forget (Mang Dynasty Irreverent Dub)"	Khruangbin	7:15
8.	"We Were Made To Be Artists"	Rhythm Plate	6:26
9.	"Code Of Love"	Debbe & The Code	5:52
10.	"Burning Up"	Lanowa	6:41
11.	"So What (Nail Edit)"	Gilbert O'Sullivan	8:33
12.	"Le Chiffre"	Canada High	5:01
13.	"Hey Dreamer"	Smashed Atoms & Backdoor Man	6:50
14.	"Arphicelago"	Gus Paterson	8:01
15.	"1998"	Fernando	6:59
16.	"Open Space"	IPG v Hot Toddy	7:36
17.	"Hyperkagome"	Carl Finlow	6:44
18.	"Kills And Kisses (Scorpio Twins Remix)"	Rheinzand	8:10
19.	"Manon Manon"	Chaz Jankel	4:56
