= Barry Can't Swim =

Scottish musician (born 1992)

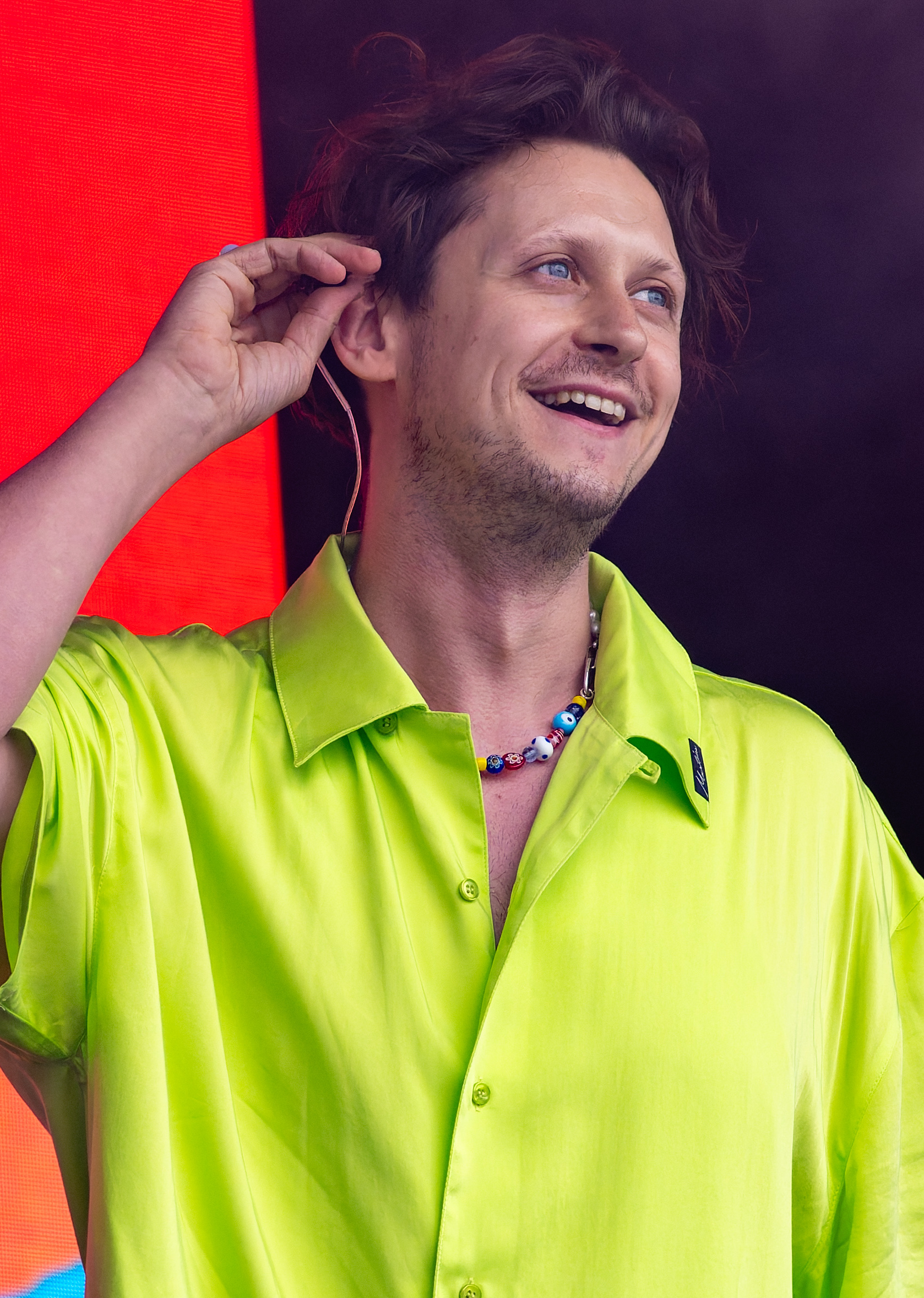
- Barry Can't Swim in 2024

Background information
- Born: Joshua Spence Mainnie; 22 August 1992 (age 34); Edinburgh, Scotland
- Genres: Electronic, dance, jazz
- Years active: 2020–present
- Website: barrycantswim.com

Joshua Spence Mainnie (born 22 August 1992), known professionally as Barry Can't Swim, is a Scottish electronic music producer and DJ from Edinburgh. His debut album When Will We Land? was released on 20 October 2023, being shortlisted for the 2024 Mercury Prize and featuring in numerous critics end of year lists. He was nominated for Best Dance Act at the 2024 Brit Awards and Breakthrough Artist at the 2026 Brit Awards

== Career ==
Barry Can't Swim released his debut EP, Amor Fati, through Shall Not Fade in July 2021, and followed this up in 2022 with More Content via Technicolour Records, a Ninja Tune imprint.

He released his debut full-length album, When Will We Land? on 20 October 2023 via Ninja Tune. The album charted at #12 in the UK Albums Charts, winning BBC Radio 1's award for "Best Dance Album", and receiving acclaim from critics. Clash rated the album 9 out of 10, describing it as "varied, zeitgeisty and just plain fun", highlighting its "astonishing" attention to detail. PopMatters ranked it as the best electronic album of 2023, calling it a "tour-de-force of 11 tracks that are so perfectly edited and composed that not a single note is wasted." The album was cited as one of the best albums of 2023 by Billboard, Clash, Mixmag, DJ Mag and PopMatters.

His second album Loner released on 11 July 2025 via Ninja Tune. It featured standout singles such as 'Still Riding' and 'Kimpton' (ft. O'Flynn) - the latter being described in a 4* album review by The Arts Desk as "a classic rather than something derivative". Mainnie reflected on his latest body of work, saying: "If my first album was a collage of all the music I loved and was inspired by growing up, then this album is the most authentic expression I could offer of myself and my life over the last year". An eclectic 11-track LP, DJ Mag said "The sonic ground covered across the LP's structure is immense, but perhaps what makes Loner feel ever-more important is that it plays back like a stage of life well-lived — often joyous, intermittently chaotic and transformative to boot. In the end, the picture it paints is one of undeniable beauty". The Times highlighted Mainnie's "way of injecting character and fun into the frequently serious world of electronic music". - Clash Magazine concurred, calling Loner "A gorgeous and varied album that will surely soundtrack countless summers". On review aggregator Metacritic, the album received 84 out of 100, indicating "universal acclaim".

In December 2023, he won the DJ Mag 'Breakthrough Producer' award.

In January 2024, it was announced that he would be performing at Coachella 2024. He also closed the weekend off in a surprise back to back DJ set with Bonobo at the Do Lab stage.

In February 2024, he won the BBC Radio 1 Dance Award for 'Best Album' for When Will We Land?

In July 2024, his debut album When Will We Land? was one of 12 shortlisted for the Mercury Prize.

He headlined London's All Points East festival in August 2025.

He identifies as more of a musician than a producer, emphasising a preference for crafting music using instruments.

== Personal life ==
Mainnie attended St Thomas of Aquin's High School in Edinburgh, and went on to study music at Edinburgh Napier University.

Mainnie began music through piano at the age of nine, after his grandfather found a 'free to a good home' advert in the local paper.

He is a supporter of Everton F.C.

== Discography ==
=== Studio albums ===
List of studio albums, with selected details and chart positions
Title	Details	Peak chart positions		
Title	Details	SCO	UK	UK Dance
When Will We Land?	Released: 20 October 2023; Label: Ninja Tune; Format: Digital download, streaming	5	12	1
Loner	Released: 11 July 2025; Label: Ninja Tune; Format: Digital download, streaming	3	10	1

Extended plays

- Amor Fati (2021)
- More Content (2022)
