= Loner (Barry Can't Swim album) =

Studio album released in 2025

Studio album by Barry Can't Swim
- Released: 11 July 2025
- Genre: Dance
- Length: 41:19
- Label: Ninja Tune
- Producer: Joshua Mainnie

Barry Can't Swim chronology
When Will We Land? (2023)	Loner (2025)

Singles from Loner
- 1. "Still Riding" Released: 24 September 2024; 2. "The Person You'd Like to Be" Released: 10 March 2025; 3. "Different" Released: 13 March 2025; 4. "Kimpton" Released: 16 April 2025; 5. "About to Begin" Released: 21 May 2025; 6. "Cars Pass By Like Childhood Sweethearts" Released: 21 May 2025; 7. "All My Friends" Released: 23 June 2025

Loner is the second studio album by Scottish record producer Joshua Mainnie, under the alias Barry Can't Swim. It was released on 11 July 2025 via Ninja Tune in LP, CD and digital formats. The album charted at No. 10 on the UK Albums Chart, and No. 1 on the UK Dance Album Chart on its week of release.

== Background ==
The album was preceded by Mainnie's full-length debut release When Will We Land? in 2023. Mainnie referred to Loner as "the most authentic expression I could offer of myself and my life over the past year." "Different" was released as the album's lead single on 13 March 2025.

== Critical reception ==
Professional ratings
Aggregate scores
Source	Rating
Metacritic	84/100
Review scores
Source	Rating
AllMusic	4/5 stars
The Arts Desk	4/5 stars
Clash	8/10
DIY	4/5 stars
MusicOMH	4/5 stars
The Scotsman	4/5 stars
The Skinny	4/5 stars
The Times	4/5 stars

On review aggregator Metacritic, the album received 84 out of 100, indicating "universal acclaim".

Popmatters ranked it as the best electronic album of the year.

AllMusic reviewer Paul Simpson comparing the album with When Will We Land?, noted Loner as an "easy improvement" and remarked, "he retains his ability to craft reflective, sentimental material while strengthening his skills at making airtight tracks designed to ignite the dancefloor."

In a four-star review for The Times, Will Hodgkinson stated "There is something so straightforward about this music, so uplifting and, to put it simply, danceable, that it does sound like the soundtrack to the summer', and that it 'cements Barry Can't Swim as a superstar DJ of note".

Writing for the British magazine MusicOMH, Donovan Livesey stated, "In the end, Loner feels like a postcard from a whirlwind year, scrawled with moments of euphoria, self-reflection, and the comedown in between." DJ Mag, described it as "a stunning, exploration of sounds that takes listeners on a genre-agnostic ride through fields of trippy spoken word, mind-bending breaks and piano-kissed house, all set against a moving backdrop of wistful soundscapes."

Lucy Ward of the Skinny, giving Loner a rating of four stars, remarked, "With Loner, Barry Can't Swim cements himself as a boundary-pushing voice in electronic music, one fluent in mood, movement, and meaningful reflection." Clash's Tom Morgan rated it eight out of ten and called it "an accessible and creative collection of colour-splattered dance music whose myriad delights feels all the more impressive for the fact that, like all the best parties, it doesn't even seem to be trying to be as fun as it is."

== Track listing ==
Loner track listing
No.	Title	Length
1.	"The Person You'd Like to Be"	3:17
2.	"Different"	3:26
3.	"Kimpton" (with O'Flynn)	3:48
4.	"All My Friends"	3:20
5.	"About to Begin"	3:30
6.	"Still Riding"	3:37
7.	"Cars Pass by Like Childhood Sweethearts"	3:05
8.	"Machine Noise for a Quiet Daydream" (featuring Séamus)	2:35
9.	"Like It's Part of the Dance"	4:32
10.	"Childhood"	3:51
11.	"Marriage"	3:14
12.	"Wandering Mt. Moon"	3:04
Total length:		41:19

== Charts ==
Chart performance for Loner
Chart (2025)	Peak position
Scottish Albums (Official Charts)	3
UK Albums (Official Charts)	10
UK Dance Albums (Official Charts)	1
UK Independent Albums (Official Charts)	3
