= When Will We Land? =

Studio album by Barry Can't Swim
- Released: 20 October 2023
- Length: 41:27
- Label: Ninja Tune

Barry Can't Swim chronology
| More Content (2022) | When Will We Land? (2023) | Loner (2025) |

When Will We Land? is the debut studio album by Scottish musician Barry Can't Swim, released on 20 October 2023. The album charted at No. 12 on the UK Albums Chart in its first week of release. The album was nominated for the 2024 Mercury Prize, and won the BBC Radio 1 Dance Award for Best Album in February 2024.

== Critical reception ==
Clash magazine recognised the album in its "Best Albums of 2023" shortlist, writing "the attention to detail here is astonishing" Clash gave the album a 9/10 review, and described it as "something quite magical".

PopMatters ranked it the best album of 2023, writing that "Barry Can't Swim's first electronic symphony is that superb".

Mixmag also included When Will We Land? in its Best Albums of the Year in 2023.

Billboard listed it as one of the best dance albums of the year in 2023, saying "its best moments [...] feel like something beyond". The album was also listed as one of the Top Albums of 2023 by DJ Mag, calling it "cohesive and immersive"

In July 2024, When Will We Land? was one of 12 albums shortlisted for the Mercury Prize, which awards the best albums released by musical acts from the UK or Ireland.

== Track listing ==
When Will We Land? track listing
| No. | Title | Length |
|---|---|---|
| 1. | "When Will We Land?" | 3:33 |
| 2. | "Deadbeat Gospel" (featuring Somedeadbeat) | 4:14 |
| 3. | "Sonder" | 3:01 |
| 4. | "How It Feels" | 2:18 |
| 5. | "Sunsleeper" | 3:42 |
| 6. | "Woman" | 3:52 |
| 7. | "I Won't Let You Down" (featuring Falle Nioke and Blackboxx) | 4:17 |
| 8. | "Always Get Through to You" | 4:06 |
| 9. | "Tell Me What You Need" (featuring Just Ill) | 3:29 |
| 10. | "Dance of the Crab" | 3:29 |
| 11. | "Define Dancing" | 5:26 |
| Total length: | | 41:27 |

== Charts ==
Chart performance for When Will We Land?
| Chart (2023) | Peak position |
|---|---|
| Scottish Albums (OCC) | 5 |
| UK Albums (OCC) | 12 |
| UK Dance Albums (OCC) | 1 |
| UK Independent Albums (OCC) | 3 |
