= Quartermile =

Mixed use redevelopment in Edinburgh, Scotland

Coordinates: 55°56′39.08″N 3°11′39.91″W

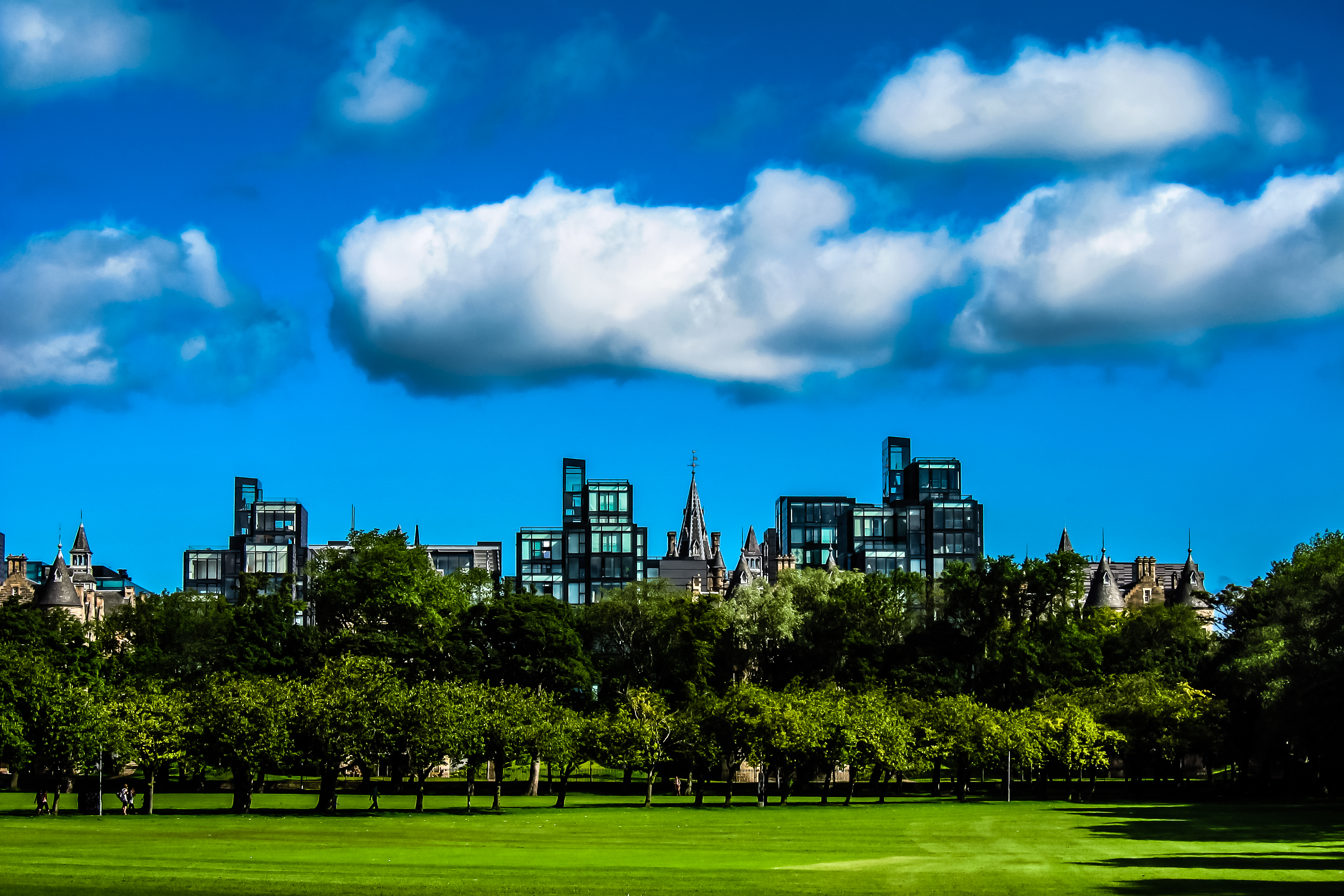
Quartermile Development skyline

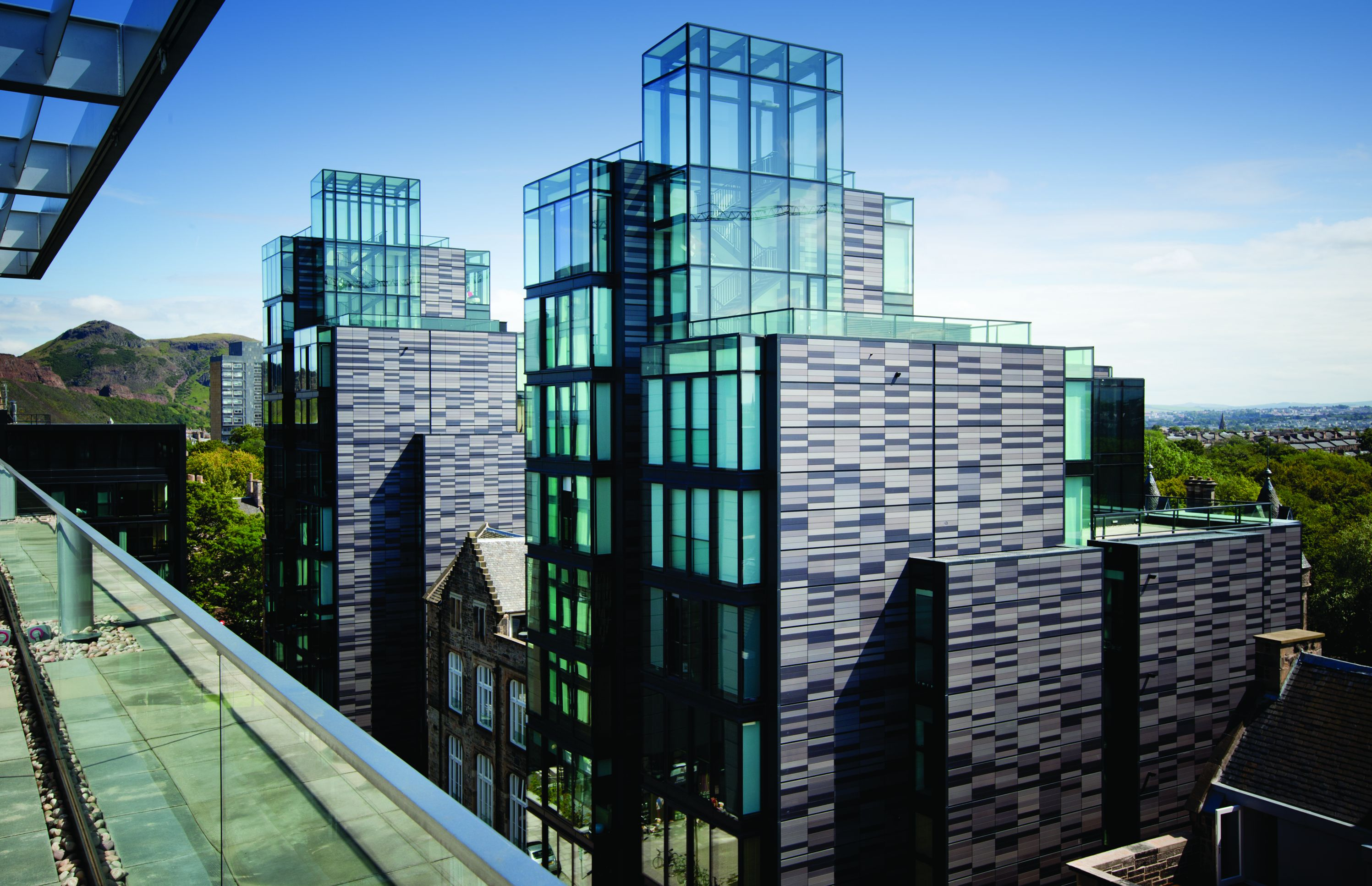
Office space in Quartermile

Quartermile is the marketing name given to the mixed use redevelopment of the former Royal Infirmary of Edinburgh site, in Lauriston, Edinburgh. It was master-planned by architect Foster + Partners and takes its name from the fact it is a quarter mile (400 m) from Edinburgh Castle and the Royal Mile and measures a quarter mile from corner to corner. It was built by Edinburgh developer Qmile Group, a holding company. The scheme comprises a mixture of new build apartments, apartments converted from existing nineteenth-century hospital buildings, new build offices, housing, and retail/leisure uses. Completed in 2018 after more than a decade of construction, it contains 1,050 apartments, 370,000 square feet (34,000 m^{2}) of office space, 65,000 square feet (6,000 m^{2}) of retail and leisure space and seven-acres of open landscape.

== Design ==
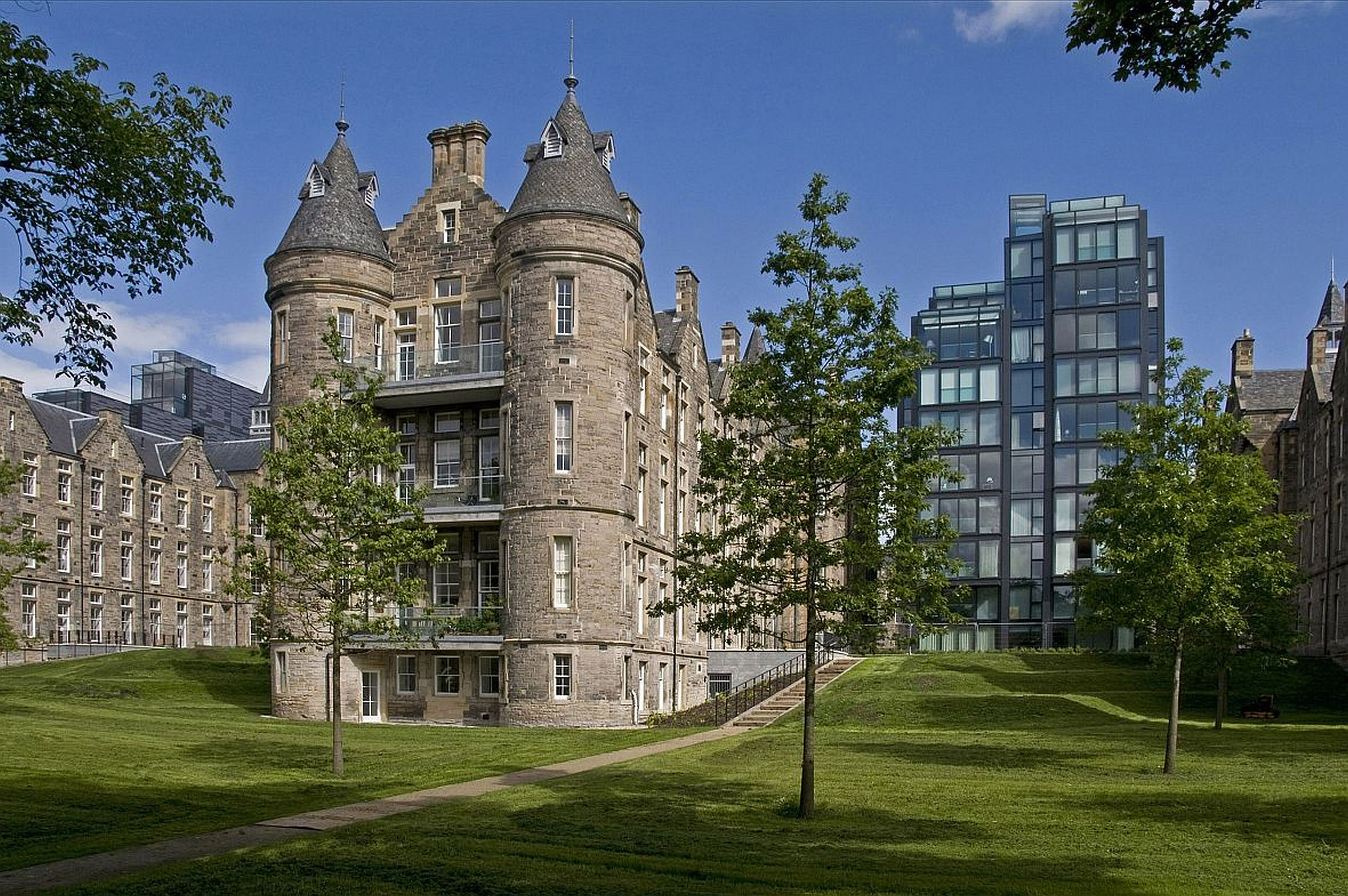
Quartermile mixes old and new construction.

The former site of the Royal Infirmary of Edinburgh was sold in 2001 by Lothian University Hospitals NHS Trust (subsequently NHS Lothian), whereupon Foster and Partners were retained as the architects for new structures whilst plans for the David Bryce-designed former hospital buildings were devised by Comprehensive Design Architects (CDA). The project overlooks and is connected to The Meadows, a large public open space in central Edinburgh.

== Tenants ==
Quartermile’s occupiers include travel company Skyscanner, hardware and software solutions supplier Cirrus Logic, and legal firms Morton Fraser and Maclay Murray & Spens. In 2017 all commercial units were fully sold or let.

The Quartermile development also houses the Edinburgh Futures Institute, which is the University of Edinburgh’s interdisciplinary hub.

== History ==
The former surgical building was at one stage intended to become a 5 star hotel, designed by Richard Murphy architects, but no operator was found to run the hotel, this was then intended for conversion to apartments. Richard Murphy architects were at that stage still however involved with the site and were considering designing affordable housing for the site.

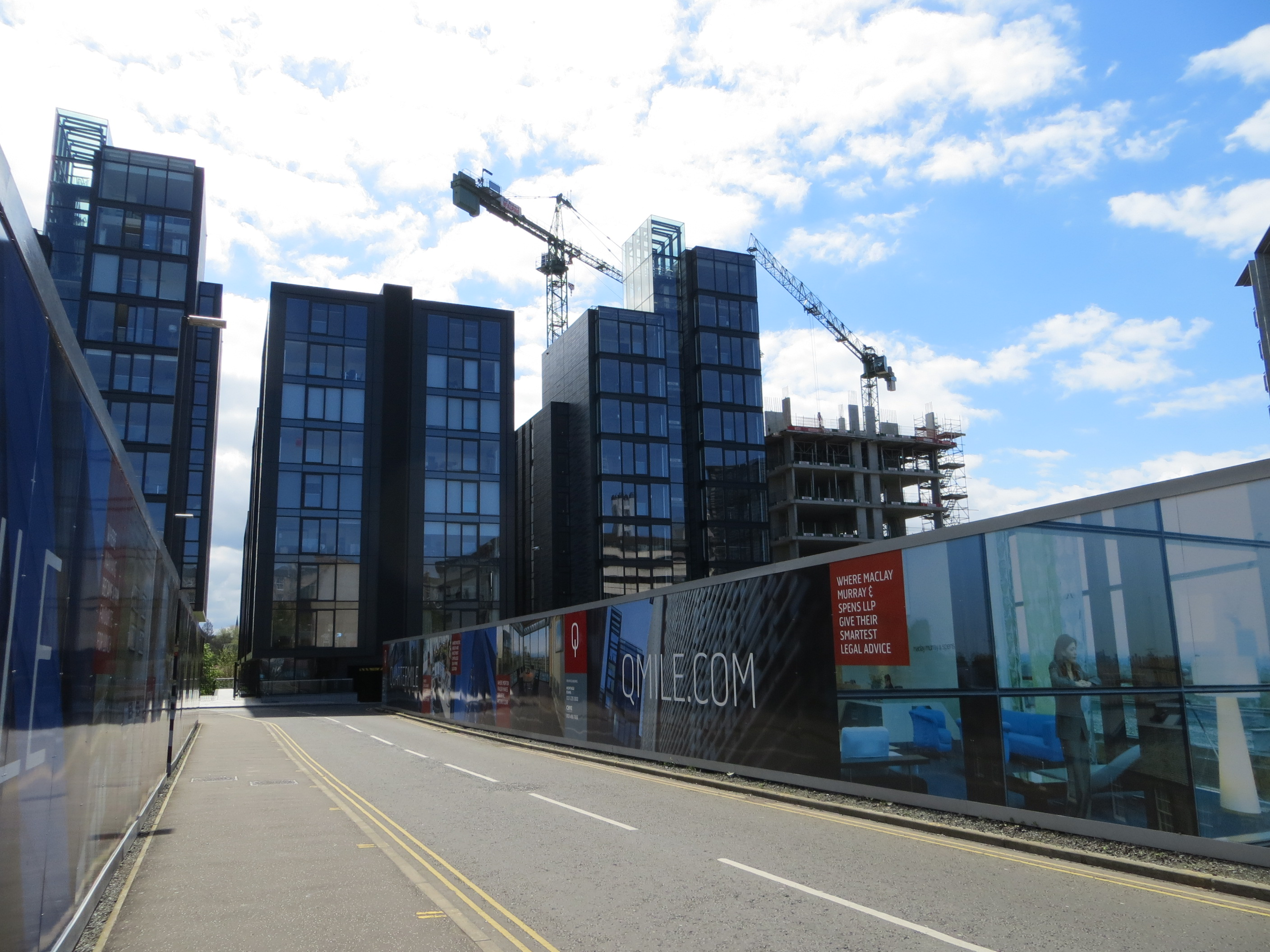
Construction at the western end progressing as of May 2014

The site was sold by the Lothian University Hospitals Trust in 2001 to a joint venture between Bank of Scotland, Taylor Woodrow and Kilmartin Property Group for around £35 million, having previously been used for the Royal Infirmary of Edinburgh. Gladedale Capital bought out Taylor Woodrow’s 50 per cent stake in 2005, while Kilmartin Property Group went into administration in 2010.

The development was sold by Lloyds Banking Group to property investor Moorfield in September 2013. By 2018, Qmile was the sole owner.

Suggestions by the International Council on Monuments and Sites that the impact of the development could cause Edinburgh to lose its World Heritage Site status were vigorously denied by the City of Edinburgh Council.

The commercial office building, Quartermile One, won the Scottish Regional Award for Best Commercial Space in the British Council for Offices Awards in 2008.
