= St Catharine's Convent, Edinburgh =

St Catharine's Convent
- St Catharine’s Mercy Centre
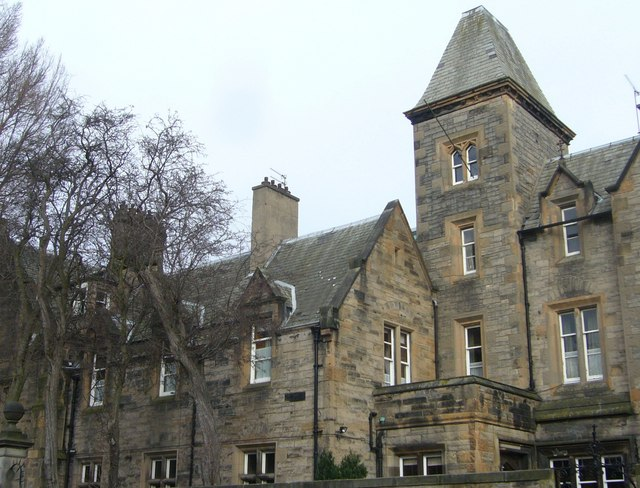
- St Catharine's Convent
- 55.9441°N 3.1992°W
- Location: Edinburgh
- Country: Scotland
- Denomination: Catholic
- Religious institute: Sisters of Mercy
- Website: mercycentre.org.uk

History
- Status: Convent
- Dedication: Catherine of Siena

Architecture
- Functional status: Active
- Heritage designation: Category B listed
- Designated: 28 August 1989
- Architect(s): David Cousin; Archibald Macpherson
- Groundbreaking: 1860
- Completed: 1892

Administration
- Archdiocese: St Andrews and Edinburgh

St Catharine's Convent or St Catharine’s Mercy Centre is a Catholic convent of the Sisters of Mercy and a centre for the homeless in Edinburgh, Scotland. It was built in 1860 and originally designed by David Cousin, with additions made in 1887 and 1892. It is located on the corner of Lauriston Gardens and Lauriston Place in the Lauriston area of Edinburgh. In 1992, it became a Mercy Centre with the mission of helping the local homeless. In 1989, it was designated a category B listed building.

== History ==
=== Foundation ===
In 1831, the Sisters of Mercy were founded in Dublin, Ireland, by Catherine McAuley. In 1849, Sisters of Mercy from Limerick came to Glasgow to found a community in Garnethill (now part of St Aloysius' College). They were invited by the Bishop James Gillis, the Apostolic Vicar of the Eastern District of Scotland to found a convent in Edinburgh. In 1860, they moved into Lauriston.

=== Construction ===
The building was originally designed by David Cousin. It was built in 1860. In 1887, the convent was expanded and a church was added. It was called St Catharine's Church. The extensions and church were designed by the architect Archibald Macpherson (1851–1927). He was an ecclesiastical architect who mainly worked on Catholic churches and schools such as Sacred Heart, Edinburgh, St Aloysius Church, Glasgow, St Aloysius' College, Glasgow and St David's Church, Dalkeith. In 1892 he made further alterations to the church building.

=== Works ===
In 1865, sisters from the convent founded a training college for Catholic teachers that would later become St Thomas of Aquin's High School. In 1886, it became an all-girl school, called St Thomas of Aquin's College. In 1975, boys were admitted to the college. In 2002, the college moved to a new building and became St Thomas of Aquin's High School.

In 1891, the Sisters of Mercy in Scotland expanded and bought the ruined remains of a pre-Reformation Franciscan monastery in Elgin, Moray, they restored them and it became Greyfriars Sisters of Mercy Convent in Elgin.

In 1992, the general chapter of the Sisters of Mercy designated St Catharine's Convent a Mercy Centre. It has the mission of supporting the local homeless and disadvantaged population of the city. As of 2022, it welcomes up to 200 people a day. On 11 July 2022, its director Sister Aelred Timmins was given an honorary doctorate by the University of Edinburgh in recognition of the centre's work.

== See also ==
- St Mary's Convent, Handsworth
- Catholic Church in Scotland
