= Lauriston =

Area of central Edinburgh, Scotland

Coordinates: 55°56′42″N 3°11′49″W

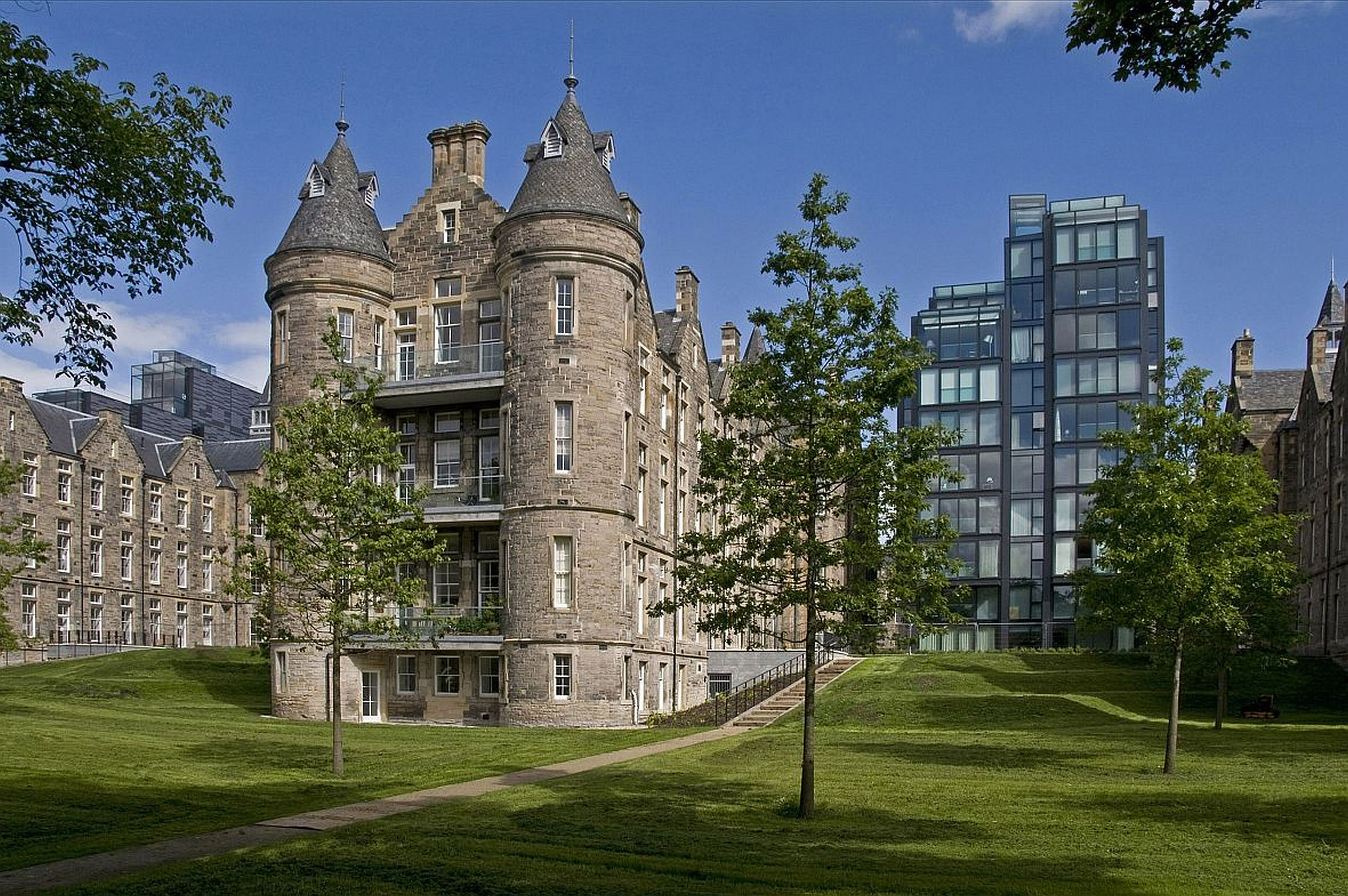
The Quartermile development in south Lauriston

Lauriston (/ˈlɒrɪstən/ LAW-ris-tun) is an area of central Edinburgh, Scotland, and home to a number of significant historic buildings. It lies south of Edinburgh Castle and the Grassmarket, and north of The Meadows public park.

Lauriston is the former location of the Edinburgh Royal Infirmary, which moved to the area in 1879 in search of fresher air at the edge of the city. Rather than build entirely new facilities, the Infirmary incorporated George Watson's Hospital into the new David Bryce-designed complex. The Infirmary operated as a voluntary hospital and teaching hospital for the University of Edinburgh Medical School until 2003, when operations were moved and the buildings sold to a private developer. The complex underwent major renovations to a design by architects Foster and Partners, resulting in the £750 million mixed-use development branded as the Quartermile. As of 2021, the University of Edinburgh is investing £120 million to convert the remaining main Infirmary buildings to house the Edinburgh Futures Institute, an interdisciplinary academic hub.

Lauriston is also home to the Edinburgh College of Art in its campus based on Lauriston Place. In 2017 it acquired the former headquarters of the Lothian and Borders Fire and Rescue Service including the Museum of Fire.

George Heriot's School, a private primary and secondary school is located in Lauriston Place opposite the Old Royal Infirmary. Founded by royal goldsmith George Heriot, the school's main building from the mid-to-late 17th century is one of the finest remaining Scottish examples of late Renaissance architecture.

Buildings in Lauriston

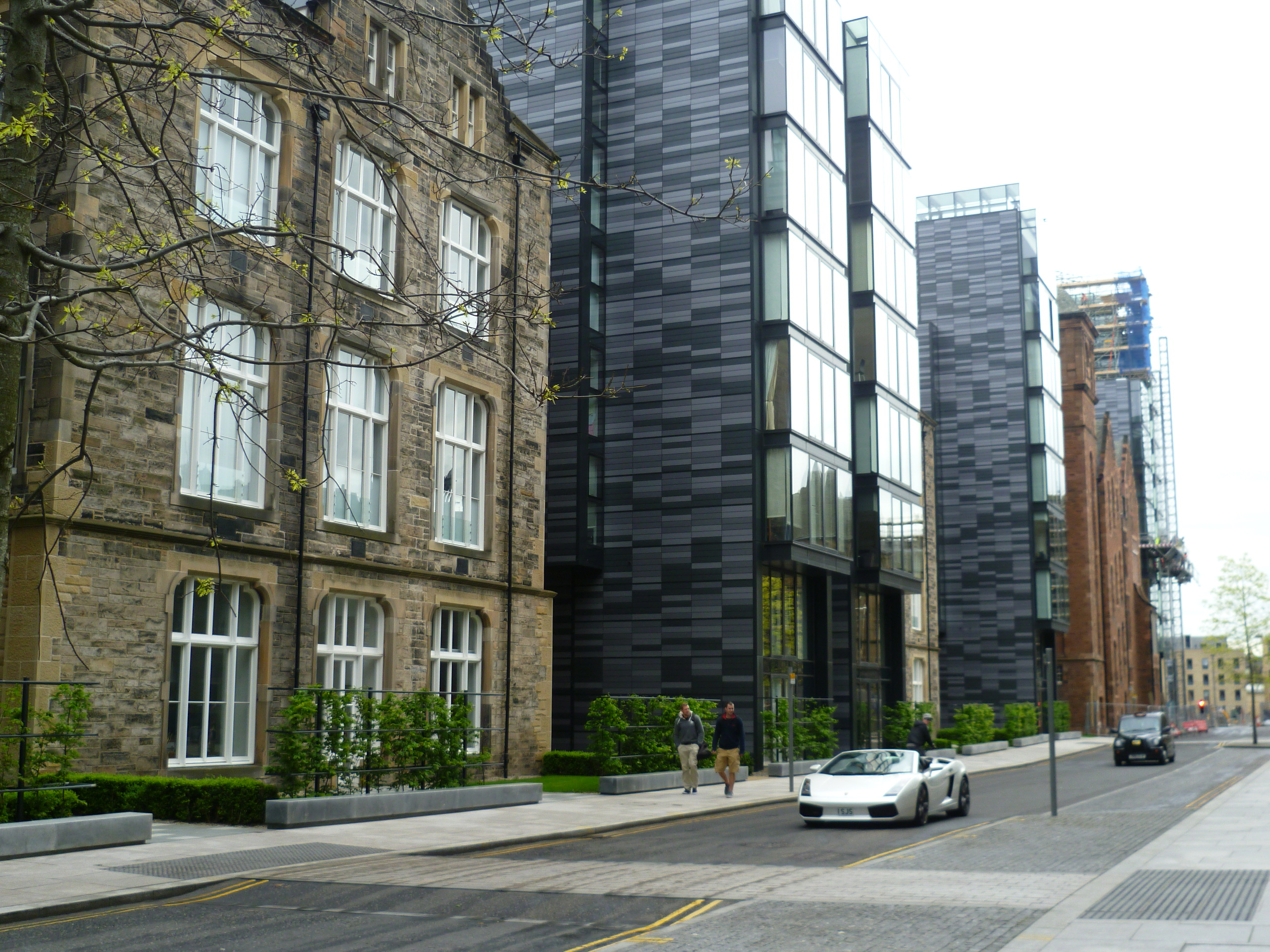
Quartermile streets

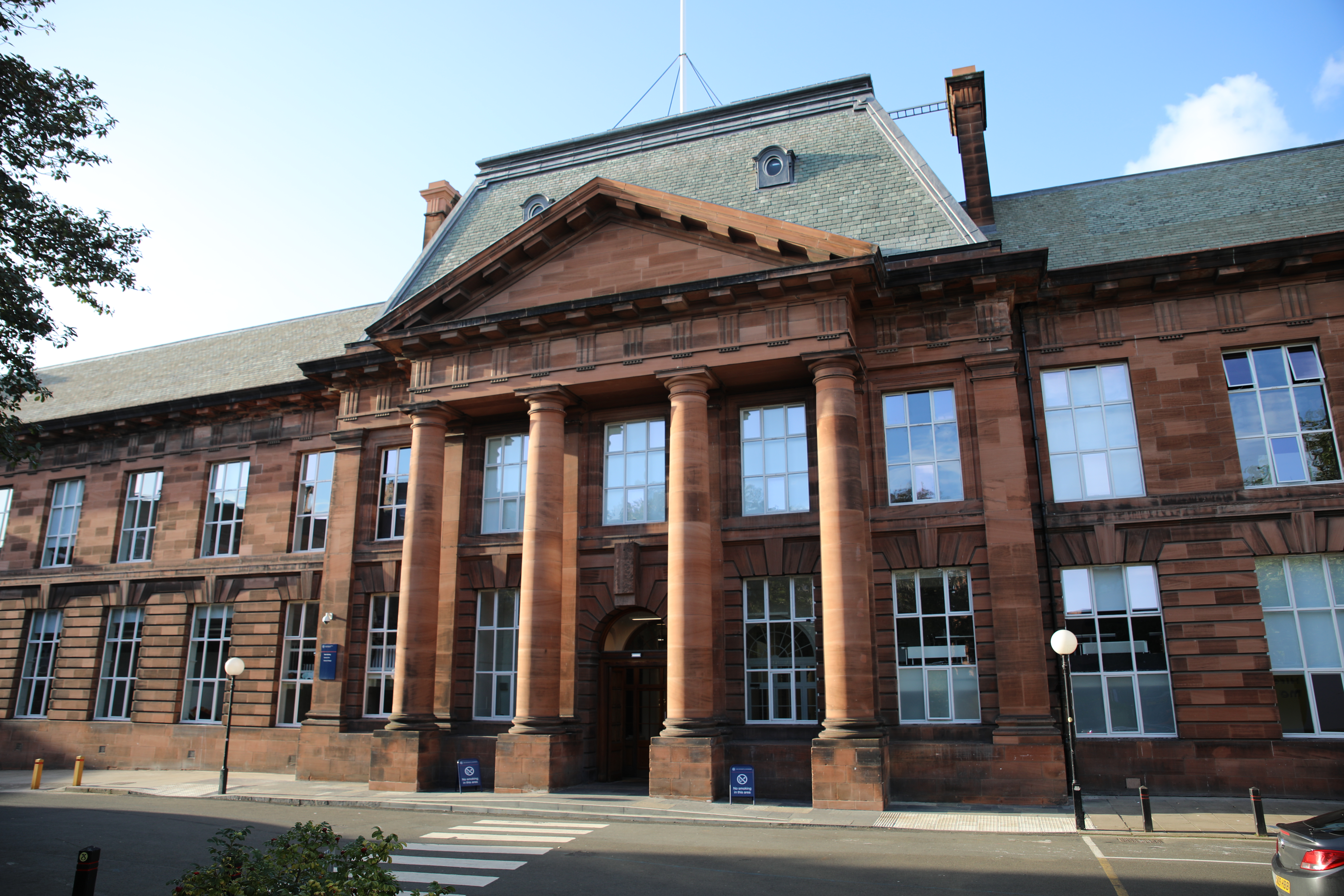
Edinburgh College of Art

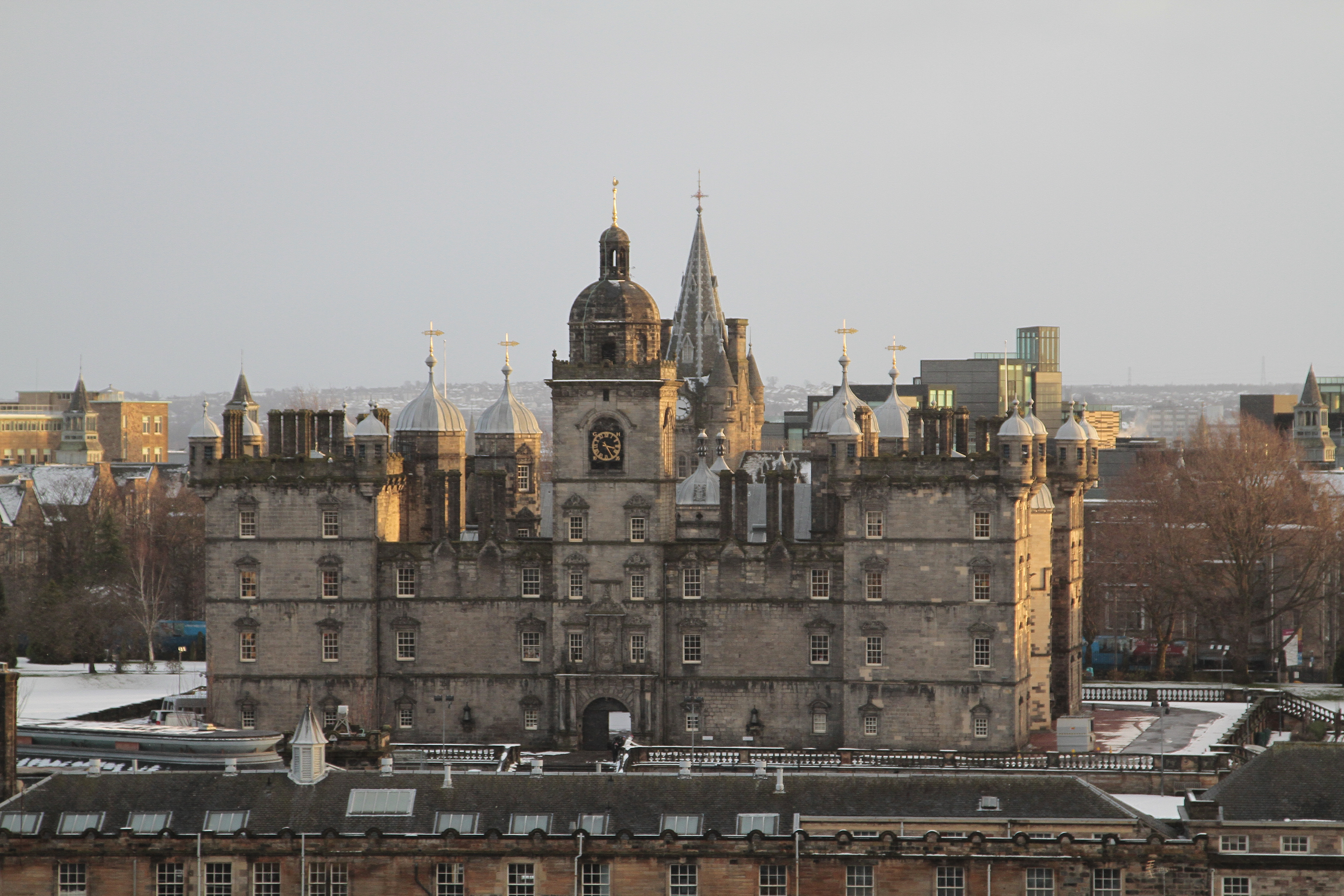
George Heriot's School

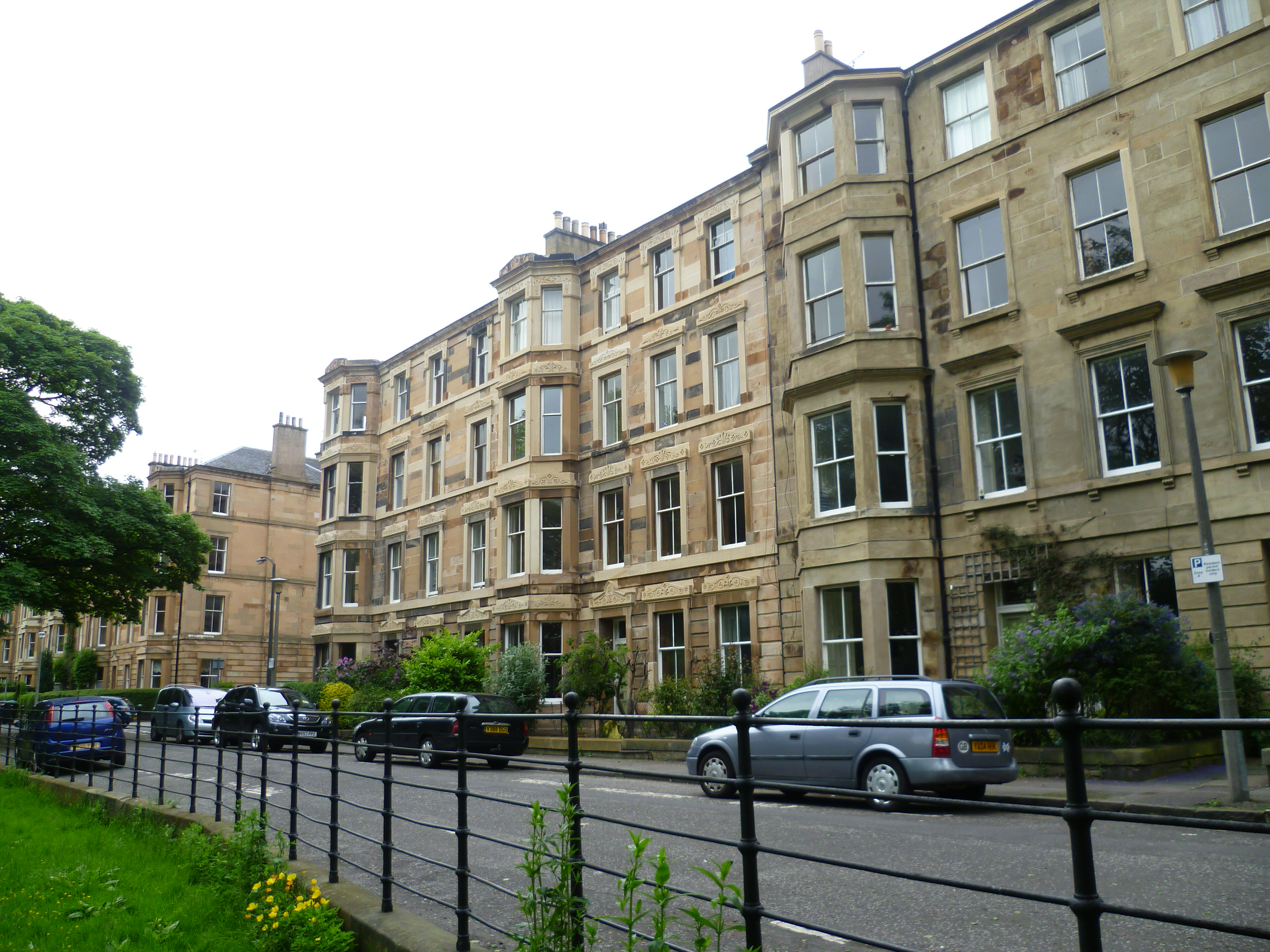
Houses in Lauriston overlooking The Meadows

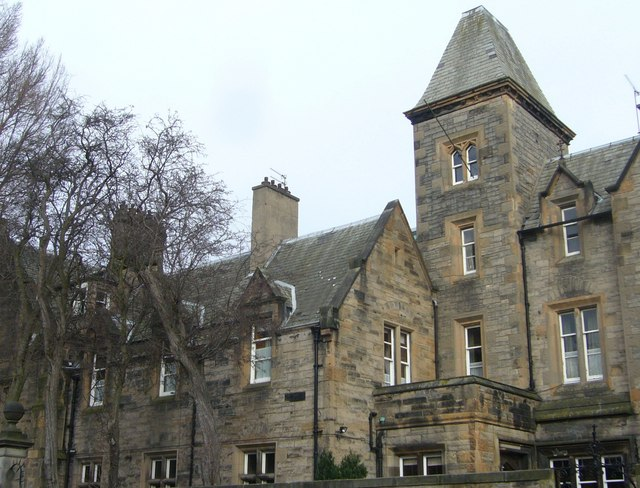
St Catharine's Convent, Lauriston Gardens
