= Friedrich Trautwein =

German engineer (1888–1956)

Friedrich Trautwein (August 11, 1888 in Würzburg – December 20, 1956 in Düsseldorf) was a German engineer. Trautwein developed the Trautonium and is considered a pioneer of electronic music in Germany.

== Life ==
As a child, Friedrich Trautwein learned to play the organ in church. He studied electrical engineering at the Technical University of Karlsruhe, followed by law and physics in Berlin and Heidelberg. In 1906, he joined the Teutonia fraternity in Karlsruhe.

He passed the traineeship examination for the higher postal service in 1911. During WWI, he was a lieutenant in charge of a mounted radio squad. After passing the assessor exam in 1919, he went on to study physics in Heidelberg and Karlsruhe, where he earned his doctorate in engineering. He began working as a postal clerk at the Telegraphentechnisches Reichsamt the following year. In this capacity, he was involved in the establishment of the first German radio station, which was based in Berlin's Vox building. He was also dealing with electrical sound generation at the time, where he received his first patent for his research in 1922.

In 1929, he accepted a lectureship at Berlin's Academy of Arts and started the development of the Trautonium, which it would be finished in 1930. Trautwein was involved in the instrument's further development until around 1933, after which Oskar Sala continued to work on it independently. In 1933, he joined the NSDAP, and later the SA.

Trautwein started working at the Image and Sound Academy BIKLA in Düsseldorf in 1949, but it quickly closed down. Subsequently, Trautwein went to the Düsseldorf Conservatory (now the Robert Schumann Hochschule) with his students and established the foundation for a degree in audio and video technology that still exists today. Another musical instrument, the electronic Monochord, was developed in Cologne in 1952 as a further development of the Trautonium and allowed dynamic variations in the shape of the sound envelope.

== Literature ==
- German Biographical Encyclopedia (DBE)
- Peter Donhauser: Electrical Sound Machines. Böhlau, Vienna 2007
- Helge Dvorak: Biographical Encyclopedia of the German Fraternity. Volume II: Artists. Winter, Heidelberg 2018, ISBN 978-3-8253-6813-5, pp. 690–692.
