= Agnes Obel =

Danish musician (born 1980)

- Obel at the 2026 Montreux Jazz Festival

Background information
- Born: Agnes Caroline Thaarup Obel; 28 October 1980 (age 46); Copenhagen, Denmark
- Origin: Berlin, Germany
- Genres: Chamber pop; neo-classical; jazz
- Occupations: Singer; songwriter; musician
- Instruments: Vocals, piano
- Years active: 1990–present
- Labels: PIAS Recordings; Deutsche Grammophon/Universal Classics
- Spouse: Alex Brüel Flagstad
- Website: agnesobel.com
- Children: 1

Agnes Caroline Thaarup Obel (born 28 October 1980) is a Danish singer, songwriter, and musician based in Berlin.

Her debut album, Philharmonics (2010), was released by PIAS Recordings and certified gold in June 2011 by the Belgian Entertainment Association (BEA) after selling 10,000 units. At the Danish Music Awards in November 2011, Obel won five prizes, including Best Album and Best Debut Artist. Her second album, Aventine (2013), received positive reviews and charted in the top 40 of the charts in nine countries.

Obel's third album, Citizen of Glass (2016), received acclaim from music critics and was the IMPALA Album of the Year Award 2016. In 2018, she curated and performed a compilation album for Late Night Tales series, titled Late Night Tales: Agnes Obel. It features artists such as Nina Simone, Henry Mancini, Ray Davies, Michelle Gurevich, Can, and Yello. Her fourth album, Myopia, was released in February 2020. Her fifth album, The Meaning of Flowers was released in September 2026.

== Early life ==
Agnes Caroline Thaarup Obel was born in Gentofte, Copenhagen, on 28 October 1980, the elder of two siblings. She and her younger brother, Holger, grew up in an unconventional environment, with a father who had three children from another marriage and loved to collect strange objects and instruments. Her mother, Katja Obel, a civil servant, used to play Bartók and Chopin on the piano. Obel learned to play the piano at a very young age. About her learning, she said: "I had a classical piano teacher who told me that I shouldn't play what I didn't like. So I just played what I liked. I was never forced to play anything else." During her childhood, she found inspiration in Jan Johansson's work. Johansson's songs, European folk tunes done in a jazzy style, have been a strong influence on her musically.

In 1990, she joined a small band as a singer and bass guitar player. The group appeared at a festival and recorded some tracks. In 1994, she had a small part in the short film The Boy Who Walked Backwards / Drengen der gik baglæns by Thomas Vinterberg. Her brother, Holger Thaarup, played the main character. Credited as Agnes Obel, she appears in two scenes. She plays a pupil who shares her table with new student Andreas (Holger Thaarup).

She attended high school at Det frie Gymnasium, a free school where she was able to play a good deal of music. However, she quickly dropped out of school. "At seventeen,(...) I met a man who was running a studio. I gave up quickly my musical studies to learn sound techniques."

== Career ==
=== 2008–2010: Philharmonics ===
Obel debuted as a solo singer with her first album Philharmonics (2010). She wrote, played, sang, recorded, and produced all the material herself. "The orchestral or symphonic music never interested me. I always was attracted by simple melodies, almost childish.(…) I put a long time before writing texts because the music seems to tell already a story, to project images." According to Obel, her piano is much more than an instrument: "The piano and the singing are two equal things to me – maybe not inseparable but very connected. You can say they are like two equal voices." She has said that, "The music is the most obvious means to express what I am, where I am."

All of the songs on Philharmonics are original works except "Close Watch" ("I Keep A Close Watch" by John Cale) & "Katie Cruel" (a folk traditional; as the iTunes bonus track of the album). In Live à Paris, released on 11 April 2011 on iTunes, she sings a cover of Elliott Smith's "Between The Bars". Furthermore, Obel did a duet with Editors singer Tom Smith, performing "The Christmas Song" by Mel Tormé on the Smith & Burrows album Funny Looking Angels (released in November 2011).

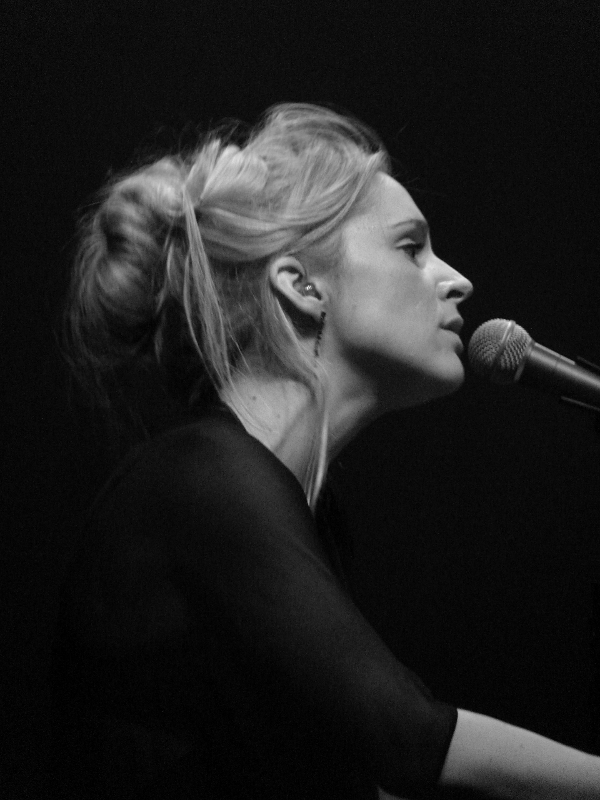
Obel at the Cirque Royal, Brussels (2011)

Philharmonics garnered generally positive reviews with, for example, James Skinner from the BBC saying that "the compositions... are slow, sombre, sepulchral even, but not without a sense of occasionally singular beauty". In the French cultural magazine Les Inrockuptibles, Johanna Seban spoke about a "disarming purity" and stated, "There is, in these deeply melancholic ballads, the clearness and reassuring nobility of bedside discs." In Musicomh, Ben Edgell wrote that Obel "sings with a hushed and tender grace that waxes wistful and serene over yearning cello, harp, and piano vignettes. She's a fey siren, with a dusky, near-whispered vocal that speaks to Ane Brun or Eva Cassidy." French journalists have called her "A revelation to follow".

Obel's first album was a commercial success. In March 2011, she appeared for the first time in the United States. At the South by Southwest (SXSW) music festival in Austin, she performed all the songs on the album.

PIAS Recordings released a Deluxe Version of Philharmonics on 7 February 2011. The Deluxe Version contains five more tracks. Two instrumentals ("Riverside" and "Just So") and three live songs: "Over the Hill", "Just So", and the new track "Smoke & Mirrors". On the Riverside EP, Obel sings "Sons & Daughters". This track is only available on the EP.

In June 2011, Philharmonics was certified gold by the Belgian Entertainment Association (BEA) after selling 10,000 units. In February 2011, her first album was nominated for the 'Impala European Independent Album of the Year' and the song Riverside (from the Submarino's soundtrack) won the Robert Award for the Best Song of the year 2011.

In October 2011, Obel won 2012 European Border Breakers Award. The prize celebrates the top new talents in European pop music who "have all succeeded in reaching out to audiences beyond their home country through their talent and energy."

In November 2011, she won five prizes at the Danish Music Awards for her first album Philharmonics. She won Best Album of the Year, Best Pop Release of the Year, Best Debut Artist of the Year, Best Female Artist of the Year, and Best Songwriter of the Year.

=== 2011–2014: Aventine ===
Obel began working on her second album in 2011. About her new album, she said, "I started to write new pieces, but all were instrumental ones, with the piano alone… In this moment, I feel more inclined to compose instrumental pieces. I already started to write some texts, but for me, it's more difficult to compose melodies."

In January 2013, Obel started mixing her new album. On 20 June 2013, she revealed that the new album, Aventine, would be released on 30 September 2013.

"On the last album, I didn't want to disturb the melody with too many stories. This time, I wanted to know if I was able to create images with words, with the sound of words.(...) I think that's a good thing when the one who is listening, is feeling it in a different way that the one who creates. We are all listening with different perspectives.(...) I don't want to impose my subjectivity to the listener."

— Obel on Aventine

On Aventine, Obel commented: "I recorded everything quite closely, miking everything closely in a small room, with voices here, the piano here – everything is close to you. So it's sparse, but by varying the dynamic range of the songs I could create almost soundscapes. I was able to make something feel big with just these few instruments."

She played at the iTunes UK Festival at the Roundhouse in London on 17 September 2013.

Frank Eidel from quebecspot.com, commented: "It's a fascinating collection of remarkable pieces, with rich and intense arrangements supported by Obel's dazzling voice."

On 24 September 2014, Aventine became available on iTunes. Tom Burgel wrote: "The few reactions collected have been very positive and, already, full with love: The elegance of Agnes and the rare grace of her writings will cause, without any doubts, some strong palpitations in the hearts of the amateurs."

The website Mushroompromotions said: "'Aventine' is a beautiful record, intriguingly unhurried. If the first record was a wander through the forest, this one takes the time to see the beauty and feel the texture in a single leaf. It is at once microcosmic and universal. (...) Agnes creates her own world, or as she calls it, a bubble or bell jar, to make her music. Once inside (or should that be outside?), she's no longer conscious of what's going on. This is the mystery of her modus operandi, something she cannot explain. Which simply adds to the ethereal quality of her music."

In October 2014, a deluxe edition of Aventine was released. This album featured three new songs. The deluxe edition contains a remix of 'Fuel to Fire' by David Lynch, who commented: "I loved doing this remix. I was turned onto Agnes' music through my record label... I think she has a most beautiful voice and can do things with her voice that are unique and extraordinary."

In October 2014, Obel played for the first time in L'Olympia in Paris.

=== 2015–2017: Citizen of Glass ===
During her 2014 tour, Obel began work on her third album: "I'm planning to work less with piano, and more with other kinds of old keyboards (...) I'm trying to find new instruments to work with, so it's sort of on the research phase and starting to write things." She also said: "I have some clear ideas but I'm not sure it is a good idea to go into specifics on such an early stage. I mainly plan to work with old keyboards like spinet and harpsichord and then see where they take me."

In June 2015, Obel began recording the new album. She recorded strings with new musicians Frédérique Labbow, Kristina Koropecki, and John Corban.

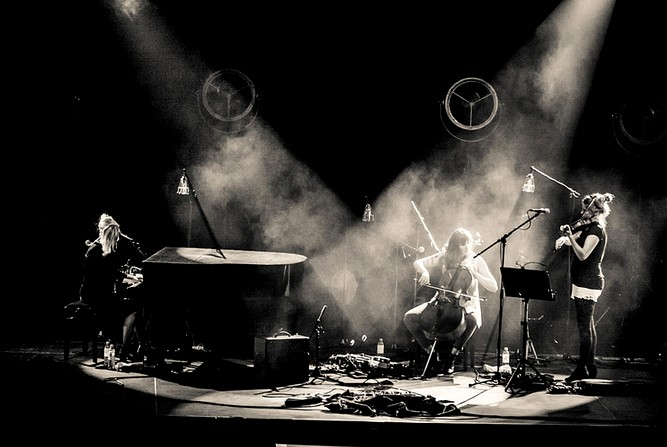
Obel (piano), Charlotte Danhier (cello), Sophie Bayet (violin) at Würzburg, Germany (2014)

In June 2016, she released the single 'Familiar', from the upcoming album. The song was recorded, produced, and mixed by Obel and features the violin by John Corban as well as cellos by Kristina Koropecki and Charlotte Danhier. The music video was directed by Obel's husband Alex Brüel Flagstad. Hugo Cassavetti from Telerama, wrote: "Agnes Obel, while remaining true to her fine style, expands her new musical fields. Percussions with a loud power rhythm a delicately acrobatic melody that the singer performs with a voice that was strangely moved. Yes, Obel, as split by technology, duets with her disturbing echoes with a male stamp."

In addition to violins, cellos, harpsichords, a spinet, and a celesta, Obel used a Trautonium, a rare electronic musical instrument from the 1930s.

In September 2016, Obel released a new single, "Golden Green". In Dansende Beren, Niels Bruwier wrote: "The sound of glass is never far away. The song is about the way we always find other better lives than ours(…)she brings out her dreamy voice, it's actually just the perfect classic pop song without embellishment. Enchanting, elysisch and paradise-like."

In October 2016, a new song from Citizen of Glass was released: "Stretch Your Eyes". This song is a new version of an older one ("Spinet Song") which was played during her tour in 2014.

In October 2016, Citizen of Glass came out. The French newspaper La Croix wrote: "With several great songs, the surrealist Stretch your eyes or the luminous Golden Green, Agnes Obel has created a sumptuous, odd and modern album. Citizen of Glass confirms, with greatness, Agnes Obel as an important pop artist."

Citizen of Glass received an average score of 82 on Metacritic, meaning universal acclaim, based on 11 reviews.

Citizen of Glass received the IMPALA (The Independent Music Companies Association) Album of the Year Award 2016, which rewards on a yearly basis the best album released on an independent European label.

=== 2018-2020: Late Night Tales and Myopia ===
In February 2018, Obel was signed to Deutsche Grammophon. The contract involved Deutsche Grammophon joining forces with Blue Note for North American releases. Mr. Trautmann, president of Deutsche Grammophon, said: "We are fascinated by Agnes's compositional autonomy and the precision with which she creates and produces her vocal and instrumental soundscapes. With every song and instrumental piece, she opens up small universes, thus reaching a broad audience with sophisticated works. With Agnes we share confidence in the long-term success of artistic excellence and credibility, as well as the intention to inspire many more fans around the world".

In May 2018, Obel contributed to Late Night Tales with a series of tracks selected by the artist herself, released as Late Night Tales: Agnes Obel. For this compilation, Obel presented various titles by very different artists. Music by Michelle Gurevich, Nina Simone, Henry Mancini, and Alfred Schnittke is included on this album.

Obel combined new works with the original song "Bee Dance", a haunting reading of the Danish song "Glemmer Du", and a new version (the third one) of "Stretch Your Eyes" called "Ambient Acapella". The first single, Inger Christensen's "Poem About Death", is set to original music by Obel.

On the topic of the haunting cover of Arvid Muller's "Glemmer du", Obel explained: "In Denmark, the song is best known in the version from 1932, sung by the actor and singer Liva Weel. It's one of my favourite melodies. The song is about the impermanence of time and love, with memories being the only thing you get at the end. (...)I recorded it using analog tape and then running the tapes again, so it sounded old and re-recorded, playing with this feeling of remembrance and of lost time."

"The entire album inhabits that desolate place of twilight solitude, and forces its listener into a mode of introspection. It's a record to experience alone. (...) There's a comfort to being pulled into Myopia's contemplative, isolating territory."

— Elisa Bray, The Independent

"Myopia was recorded during sleepless late nights in her home studio in Berlin, which is audible in the record's hushed, contemplative and weightless melancholy. Obel's wistful, rain-flecked gauziness has grown more pronounced here. Songs like "Island of Doom" and "Broken Sleep" prick the hairs on the back of your neck with their unnerving dissections of the fragile human heart"

— Michael Sumsion, PopMatters

On 29 October 2019, Obel announced the title of her upcoming album, Myopia, on social media, and released the new single "Island of Doom". The album was released on 21 February 2020. Journalist Tim Peacock wrote: "Obel has been under self-imposed creative isolation with the removal of all outside influences and distraction in the writing, recording and mixing process for 'Myopia'."

About "Island of Doom", the artist said: "The song is made up of pitched-down piano and cello pizzicato and vocals, all choirs are pitched down and up… In my experience when someone close to you dies it is simply impossible to comprehend that you can't ever talk to them or reach them somehow ever again."

"Island of Doom" features Obel on piano, vocals, and keys, and Kristina Koropecki on cello, creating a sober tone, with sweet instrumentals, and a strong vocal performance from Obel. The visual show opens up with a shot of Obel and is completely dominated with blue colors and hues, showing a unique landscape that appears out of this world.

Concerning the meaning of Myopia, Obel explained: "For me Myopia is an album about trust and doubt. Can you trust yourself or not? Can you trust your own judgments? Can you trust that you will do the right thing? Can you trust your instincts and what you are feeling? Or are your feelings skewed?"

On 7 January 2020, Obel released the single "Broken Sleep." Journalist Drew Feinerman said: "The video (created by Obel's longterm collaborator and partner Alex Brüel Flagstad) pairs perfectly with the style of the composition; Obel sings with such beauty and ease, as the vocals complement the effortless, flowing pace of the visuals."

About Myopia, journalist Tina Benitez-Eves stated: "Myopia is an abstract anatomization of the human psyche, transcending through ambient instrumentals, and an intoxicating blend of vocals, hovering on Jarboe-bred voice manipulation on atmospheric "Broken Sleep" and "Island of Doom."

Ashley Bardhan, in Pitchfork, said also: "These songs are obscured like frosted glass, as meticulously pretty and faintly unnerving as a porcelain doll. Though the album ends almost as quietly as it began, Obel's whispery ambient fog lingers far longer."

In June 2020, for the first time, Obel showed in a video her Berlin studio where she improvised some music with her band. The artist writes mostly at night and is always alone in her private studio in Berlin. Normally, Obel does not let anyone visit her there.

=== 2021-2022: Further career and musical treatment ===
In December 2021, it was announced that Obel would perform at the 2022 Rock Altitude Festival, a music festival held in Le Locle, Switzerland. She performed on August 13, the last day of the four-day festival.

Obel is working on depression treatment pieces for a clinic in Denmark. She said in an interview: "There's also the element that we don't really understand our minds, but we also don't understand music and why music has such a strong effect on us, which is all part of the puzzle and riddle we have understanding our consciousness and our brains and our minds."

== Artistry ==
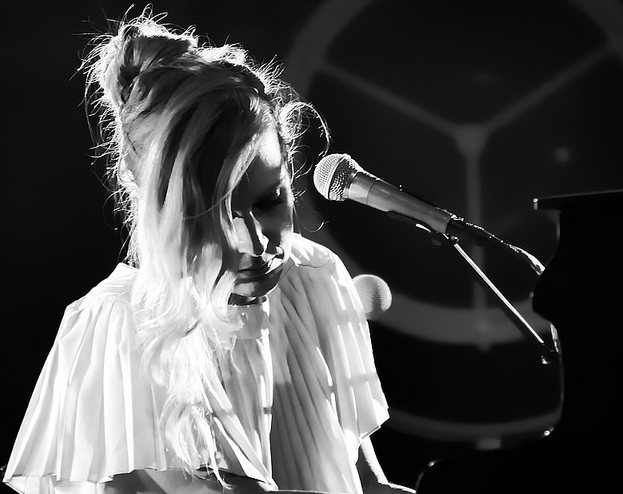
Obel at Les Nuits Secrètes (2014)

=== Musical style ===
Obel is described by The Irish Times journalist Lauren Murphy as "the architect of eerie, otherworldy music that straddles neo-classical, jazz and chamber pop". In another analysis, Clash magazine's Lauren McDermott deems Obel's music "poised and haunting chamber pop" with "wraithlike harmonies, sonic textures and bewitching melancholy" rendered with "gothic violins", "cello pizzicatos", and electronic instruments, lending a sense of intimacy reflective of the aura in Berlin.

=== Influences ===
Obel is influenced by artists such as Roy Orbison and also by the French composers Claude Debussy, Maurice Ravel, and Erik Satie. She also likes Edgar Allan Poe, photographers Sibylle Bergemann, Robert Mapplethorpe, and Tina Modotti, and director Alfred Hitchcock. Concerning Hitchcock, she said, "I adore his enigmatic style, his sophisticated esthetic but always with an extreme simplicity." The cover of her first album, photographed by Berlin photographer Mali Lazell, is an 'homage' to The Birds.

Obel also likes the experimental filmmaker Maya Deren. Sometimes, Obel tests some of her demos on Deren's movies. Obel is also a huge fan of Nina Simone: "I have a fantastic live album by Nina Simone on which she sings "Who Knows Where the Time Goes". Her vocals seem to come out of nowhere. Magic." In addition to classical music, Obel listens to artists like Mort Garson (The Zodiac: Cosmic Sounds), The Smiths ("How Soon Is Now?"), and Françoise Hardy ("Où va la chance").

In February 2017, and after her covers of John Cale and Jeff Buckley songs, Obel performed "Hallelujah" in a tribute to the late Leonard Cohen at the 'Victoire de la Musique 2017'.

== Personal life ==
Obel met Alex Brüel Flagstad, her future husband, when they were both 13. They began dating a decade later and moved to Berlin in 2006. Flagstad, a photographer and animation artist, filmed and directed the music videos for "Riverside", "Dorian", "The Curse", and "Aventine". They have a daughter together.

Obel has said that she suffers from insomnia while in the process of writing songs. In an interview with Clash, Obel described herself as "not religious at all".

== Usage in media ==
Three songs from the Philharmonics album were on the soundtrack of the 2009 film Submarino ("Riverside", "Brother Sparrow", and "Philharmonics"). "Brother Sparrow" was also used in season 1, episode 2, of the series A Nearly Normal Family.

Obel's song "Riverside" was featured on the Spike TV series The Mist in season 1, episode 2, "Withdrawal"; in the TV show Revenge in Season 1, Episode 4 "Duplicity"; in the episode "Not Responsible" of Grey's Anatomy; in Episode 12 of the second season of the Australian comedy-drama Offspring; in the British TV show Lovesick; in season 1, episode 2 of the Danish series, The Rain; as the theme tunes of the mini-series Next of Kin and The Last Anniversary; over the opening credits of the Italian crime drama series Io ti cercherò; and in the episodes "Duplicity" and "What Are You Doing Here, Ho-Bag?" from The CW's Ringer.

"Avenue" was played in the episode "Trust" from Revenge. "Fuel to Fire" was used in the episode "The Big Uneasy" of The Originals. In April 2011, the Danish group Lulu Rouge released a remixed version of "Riverside". Keeping the track's original beauty, Lulu Rouge added their special electronic tempo. Prior to the release of "Philharmonics", the soft, soothing tunes of "Just So" were used as the soundtrack of a commercial for Deutsche Telekom on German TV in 2008.

Her songs "Familiar", "It's Happening Again", and "Broken Sleep" were featured on episodes of the German TV series Dark. "Familiar" was also used in the video game Dark Souls III: The Fire Fades Edition trailer and is the theme song to the Canadian TV series Cardinal. "Dorian" was used in the Amazon Prime series Hanna in season 2, episode 8. "September Song" featured throughout the first season of Big Little Lies. "Pass Them By" was featured in the HBO series The Leftovers. "Run Cried The Crawling" was used in the premiere episode of Euphoria.

"Fuel to Fire" appeared in the TV shows Our Girl, Carnival Row, The Shannara Chronicles, The Originals, Elite, Medici, Praxis mit Meerblick, and The Last of Us. In addition, it was used as the theme tune of the 2021 BBC One series Vigil.

"The Curse" was featured in a scene of the Fox drama series 9-1-1, in season 5, episode 4. It was also featured in the YouTube teaser trailer of the PS4 game The Long Dark. In addition, "The Curse" was featured at the end of the last episode in the television series The Investigation, which originally aired in Denmark and Sweden in 2020. It was also featured in the 2021 Globoplay telenovela Verdades Secretas II where it served as the love theme for protagonists Angel and Cristiano.

"Bee Dance" was featured on the trailer of the HBO dark comedy The Baby.

== Discography ==
=== Studio albums ===
List of albums, with chart positions and certifications
Title	Album details	Peak chart positions										Certifications
Title	Album details	DEN	AUS	BEL	FRA	GER	IRE	NLD	NOR	SWI	UK	Certifications
Philharmonics	Released: 4 October 2010; Label: PIAS; Formats: LP, CD, digital download	1	—	1	8	—	—	8	—	58	—	DEN: 6× Platinum; BEL: Platinum; FRA: Platinum; NLD: Gold
Aventine	Released: 30 September 2013; Label: Play It Again Sam; Formats: LP, CD, digital download, box set	1	—	1	2	24	38	5	23	9	63	DEN: Gold; FRA: Platinum; BEL: Gold; UK: Silver
Citizen of Glass	Released: 21 October 2016; Label: Play It Again Sam; Formats: LP, CD, digital download	3	64	8	6	32	37	9	—	9	30	FRA: Platinum
Myopia	Released: 21 February 2020; Label: Strange Harvest Limited; Formats: LP, CD, digital download	11	—	6	7	9	—	15	—	5	34	
The Meaning of Flowers	Released: 18 September 2026; Label: Deutsche Grammophon; Formats: LP, CD, digital download	—	43	4	19	9	—	15	—	8	—	
"—" denotes releases that did not chart.

=== Compilations ===
Title	Album details
Late Night Tales: Agnes Obel	Released: 25 May 2018; Label: Night Time Stories; Formats: LP, CD, digital download

=== EPs ===
List of albums, with chart positions
Title	Album details	Peak chart positions
Title	Album details	FRA
iTunes Live à Paris	Released: 11 April 2011; Label: PIAS; Formats: Digital download	131
iTunes Festival: London 2013	Released: 25 September 2013; Label: PIAS; Formats: Digital download	—
"—" denotes releases that did not chart.

=== Singles ===
List of singles, with chart positions showing year released and album name
Single	Year	Peak chart positions						Certifications	Album
Single	Year	DEN	BEL	FRA	GER	NLD	SWI	Certifications	Album
"Riverside"	2010	2	3	71	—	—	58	DEN: Platinum; BEL: Platinum	Philharmonics
"Just So"	2010	—	62	—	44	87	—		Philharmonics
"Brother Sparrow"	2011	—	65	—	—	—	—	DEN: Gold	Philharmonics
"The Curse"	2013	—	43	112	—	—	—		Aventine
"Fuel to Fire"	2013	—	—	88	—	—	—		Aventine
"Familiar"	2016	—	—	54	—	—	—		Citizen of Glass
"Golden Green"	2016	—	—	—	—	—	—		Citizen of Glass
"Island of Doom"	2019	—	—	—	—	—	—	—	Myopia
"—" denotes releases that did not chart.

=== Other charted songs ===
List of singles, with chart positions showing year released and album name
Single	Year	Peak chart positions	Album
Single	Year	BEL	Album
"On Powdered Ground"	2011	76	Philharmonics
"The Christmas Song" (Smith & Burrows featuring Agnes Obel)	2011	—	Funny Looking Angels

== Awards and nominations ==
Year	Organisation	Work	Award	Result	Ref.
2011	Danish Music Awards	Årets bedste album (Best Album Of The Year)	Philharmonics	Won	
2011	Danish Music Awards	Årets bedste popudgivelse (Best Pop Release Of The Year)	Philharmonics	Won	
2011	Danish Music Awards	Årets bedste debutkunstner (Best Debut Artist Of The Year)	Herself	Won	
2011	Danish Music Awards	Årets bedste kvindelige kunstner (Best Female Artist Of The Year)	Herself	Won	
2011	Danish Music Awards	Årets bedste sangskriver (Best Songwriter Of The Year)	Herself	Won	
2017	Independent Music Companies Association	Album of the Year	Citizen of Glass	Won	
