= Maria Schüppel =

German music therapist, and composer (1923–2011)

Maria Schüppel (28 May 1923 – 27 June 2011) was a German composer, educator, pianist and pioneering music therapist who composed works for lyre and voice, and experimented with electronic music.

Schüppel was born in Chemnitz. After her father’s death, her family moved to Görlitz, where she studied piano with Eberhard Wenzel. She later studied music in Dresden, Breslau, and Weimar, and passed her state examination in Weimar in 1945. She worked as a music teacher and at Weimar Radio, composing art songs and folk songs. In 1950, Schüppel found a job in East Berlin, where she gave harpsichord and clavichord recitals and studied the trautonium (an early electronic synthesizer) with Oskar Sala. She worked at the German University of Music (today the Hochschule für Musik Hanns Eisler Berlin) until 1957 when she moved to West Berlin to focus on music therapy. She traveled throughout Europe and studied or collaborated with Hans-Heinrich Engel, Karl König, Anny von Lange, Hermann Pfrogner, Edmund Pracht, Gotthard Starke, and Rudolph Treichler.

Together with Hildegard Prym, Schüppel developed the anthroposophical music therapy (AnMt) training course in Berlin at the Musiktherapeutische Arbeitsstätte (Center for Music Therapy) in 1963 and directed it until 1993. AnMt was based on an approach developed by Rudolph Steiner to address the patient’s spiritual health as well as his or her physical health. In 1994, the German Society of Music Therapy awarded Schüppel with honorary membership for her work in developing the field of music therapy. Maria Schüppel died in Berlin.

Schüppel’s compositions included:

== Chamber ==
- Mercury Bath (lyre)
- Music in Three Movements in the Baroque Style (lyre)
- Suite (lyre)
- Zweistimmige Fassung der Festmusiken (soprano and alto lyres)
- Trio in C-Dur (soprano recorder, treble recorder and guitar), composed in 1953, edited by Bruno Henze in "Das Gitarrespiel", vol. 15a (Friedrich Hofmeister Musikverlag, Leipzig 1964)

== Vocal ==
- art songs
- “Auf dem Mond” (voice and lyre)
- folk songs
- “Solve et Coagula: Raunendes Feuer” (voice and electronics; text is Feuerlied from the Celtic myth “Die Kinder des LIr”)
