= Evangelische Hochschule für Kirchenmusik Halle =

German reformed college

The Evangelische Hochschule für Kirchenmusik Halle (Saale) is a university, specialised in music, in Halle an der Saale.

It was established as the Evangelischen Kirchenmusikschule on 18 April 1926 by the consistory of the Evangelical Church of the Church Province of Saxony in Aschersleben.

On 29 January 1939, it moved from Aschersleben to Halle, into the building of the Schlesisches Konvikt on Wilhelmstraße, today Emil Abderhalden-Straße.

In 1993, the Evangelischen Kirchenmusikschule was granted the status of a university, and renamed. In 2001, it moved to the Händelkarree (Kleine Ulrichstraße 35). The now located in the immediate vicinity of the musicological institute of the University of Halle, the Halle music library and the Handel House.

== Directors ==
- 1926–1936 Julius Bürger, organist at the St.-Stephani-Kirche, Aschersleben
- 1936–1939 Bernhard Henking, cantor of Magdeburg Cathedral
- 1939–1951 Kurt Fiebig
- 1951–1965 Eberhard Wenzel
- 1965–1977 Walter Bruhns
- 1977–1978 Ursula Hermann (provisional management)
- 1978–1999 Helmut Gleim
- 2000–2017 Wolfgang Kupke
- 2017–present Peter Kopp
