= Citizen of Glass =

2016 studio album by Agnes Obel

Studio album by Agnes Obel
- Released: 21 October 2016
- Recorded: 2014–2016
- Venue: Berlin
- Genre: Folk; classical; indie pop
- Length: 40:50
- Label: PIAS

Agnes Obel chronology
Aventine (2013)	Citizen of Glass (2016)	Late Night Tales: Agnes Obel (2018)

Singles from Citizen of Glass
- 1. "Familiar" Released: 29 June 2016; 2. "Golden Green" Released: 31 August 2016; 3. "It's Happening Again" Released: 18 November 2016; 4. "Stretch Your Eyes" Released: 3 March 2017

Citizen of Glass is the third studio album by Danish singer-songwriter Agnes Obel, released on 21 October 2016 by PIAS Recordings. Four tracks were selected as singles: "Familiar", "Golden Green", "It's Happening Again", and "Stretch Your Eyes". Obel launched a European tour at the end of October 2016, followed by a North American tour in February 2017.

== Background ==
On this album, Obel evokes the German concept of Gläserner Bürger, the "citizen of glass", as the guiding thread of the album, a citizen whose body and life are known to everyone. She discovered this term during her previous tour, while reading the news about the Edward Snowden case and citizen surveillance. Questions of transparency and privacy are themes that inspired her, forcing her to think about what she reveals of herself in her music. She worked on the concept of "glass" to create new songs, particularly by adding new instruments to her repertoire such as the trautonium, a rare instrument from the late 1920s whose crystalline sounds are reminiscent of glass.

== Reception ==
Professional ratings
Aggregate scores
Source	Rating
Metacritic	82/100
Review scores
Source	Rating
AllMusic	4/5 stars
Exclaim!	9/10
The Independent	3/5 stars
musicOMH	4/5 stars
The Quietus	4/5 stars

Citizen of Glass received universal acclaim from music critics. At Metacritic, which assigns a normalized rating out of 100 to reviews from mainstream critics, the album received an average score of 82, citing "universal acclaim", based on 11 reviews.

John Murphy from musicOMH wrote "Some earlier fans of Obel may miss the more minimal sound of her early albums, and there’s certainly no big crossover track that will propel Obel to the mainstream. This is a haunting listen though, and one that will provide suitable company as the long winter nights start to draw in."

James Christopher Monger at AllMusic wrote "Where her relatively austere prior outings relied largely on piano and strings, Citizen of Glass revels in ghostly electronics and voice modulation, even going so far as to bring in a temperamental, late-'20s monophonic synthesizer called a Trautonium. The string arrangements are more ambitious and the composition style is a bit more opaque, but the ten-track set is unequivocally Obel-esque."

== Track listing ==
All tracks are written by Agnes Obel.

No.	Title	Length
1.	"Stretch Your Eyes"	5:11
2.	"Familiar"	3:55
3.	"Red Virgin Soil"	2:43
4.	"It's Happening Again"	4:20
5.	"Stone"	3:56
6.	"Trojan Horses"	5:33
7.	"Citizen of Glass"	2:49
8.	"Golden Green"	3:59
9.	"Grasshopper"	2:38
10.	"Mary"	5:47
Total length:		40:50

== Charts ==
=== Weekly charts ===
Chart (2016)	Peak position
Austrian Albums (Ö3 Austria)	54
Belgian Albums (Ultratop Flanders)	8
Belgian Albums (Ultratop Wallonia)	4
Danish Albums (Hitlisten)	3
Dutch Albums (Album Top 100)	9
French Albums (SNEP)	6
German Albums (Offizielle Top 100)	32
Irish Albums (IRMA)	37
Scottish Albums (OCC)	19
Swiss Albums (Schweizer Hitparade)	9
UK Albums (OCC)	30

=== Year-end charts ===
Chart (2016)	Position
Belgian Albums (Ultratop Flanders)	93
Belgian Albums (Ultratop Wallonia)	55
French Albums (SNEP)	87

Chart (2017)	Position
Belgian Albums (Ultratop Wallonia)	194

== Certifications ==
Region	Certification	Certified units/sales
France (SNEP)	Platinum	100,000^{‡}
^{‡} Sales+streaming figures based on certification alone.
