= Aventine (album) =

Studio album by Agnes Obel
- Released: 30 September 2013
- Recorded: 2012–2013 (Berlin, Germany)
- Studio: Chalk Wood Studios
- Genre: Folk; classical; indie pop
- Length: 40:56
- Label: PIAS
- Producer: Agnes Obel

Agnes Obel chronology
Philharmonics (2010)	Aventine (2013)	Citizen of Glass (2016)

Singles from Aventine
- 1. "The Curse" Released: 20 August 2013; 2. "Fuel to Fire" Released: 20 September 2013; 3. "Dorian" Released: 16 December 2013; 4. "Aventine" Released: 31 March 2014; 5. "Words Are Dead" Released: 18 July 2014

Aventine is the second studio album by Danish singer-songwriter Agnes Obel, released on 30 September 2013 by PIAS Recordings. The album received positive reviews from music critics. It was also a commercial success, charting inside the top 40 of the charts in nine countries.

== Background ==
The album was announced in June 2013. The album was written, produced, arranged, and mixed by Obel herself at Chalk Wood Studios from 2012 to 2013. In January 2013, the album was given its final mixdown. The album features the instrumentation of Timber Timbre musician Mika Posen.

On Aventine, Agnes Obel commented : "I recorded everything quite closely, miking everything closely in a small room, with voices here, the piano here – everything is close to you. So it's sparse, but by varying the dynamic range of the songs I could create almost soundscapes. I was able to make something feel big with just these few instruments."

== Promotion ==
To promote the album, Obel streamed Aventine online. On 4 September, Obel performed the album live at St Pancras Old Church for a select group of UK journalists and music industry members. On 17 September, Obel opened for Ludovico Einaudi at the iTunes Festival and her performance was recorded and released as an EP titled iTunes Festival: London 2013. In October, Obel appeared on France 24 to discuss the album.

The album was preceded by the single "The Curse" in August 2013 with the music video being directed by Alex Brüel Flagstad. Obel recorded a live version of the song in Berlin for KCRW.

In December 2021, Peacock released a drama series titled Vigil which features "Fuel to Fire" as its theme music.

== Reception ==
Professional ratings
Aggregate scores
Source	Rating
Metacritic	74/100
Review scores
Source	Rating
The Guardian	4/5 stars
Mojo	4/5 stars
MusicOMH	4/5 stars
Q	4/5 stars
The Quietus	Very Favourable
Uncut	3.5/5 stars

Aventine received generally positive reviews from music critics. At Metacritic, which assigns a normalized rating out of 100 to reviews from mainstream critics, the album received an average score of 74, which indicates "generally favorable reviews", based on 10 reviews.

James Skinner, in The Quietus, writes : "Ultimately, Aventine is a triumph of carefully sustained mood; of a sadness that is not so much overbearing as it beautiful, and one that lingers in the silences between listens of this unusual, unusually compelling record."

Caroline Sullivan, from The Guardian, wrote, "The lyrics are impressionistic sketches (...) suggesting she saved the real firepower for the exquisite arrangements : sculpting strings and piano into beautifully melancholy ripples. Like Ane Brun and Seventh Tree-era Alison Goldfrapp, Obel is exceedingly good at conveying weariness and disorientation through sound (...). A wonderful autumn album."

Alice Parker, from Contact Music, agreed: "This album is simply stunning and, if possible, even more captivating than her first album. 'Aventine' is nothing short of mesmerising and it is clear that this 'difficult second album' will live up to expectation and could quite possibly surpass the success of its predecessor."

== Track listing ==
All tracks are written by Agnes Obel.

No.	Title	Length
1.	"Chord Left"	2:29
2.	"Fuel to Fire"	5:29
3.	"Dorian"	4:48
4.	"Aventine"	4:08
5.	"Run Cried the Crawling"	4:26
6.	"Tokka"	1:30
7.	"The Curse"	5:53
8.	"Pass Them By"	3:31
9.	"Words Are Dead"	3:46
10.	"Fivefold"	1:59
11.	"Smoke & Mirrors"	2:57
Total length:		40:56

Danish bonus track
No.	Title	Length
12.	"September Song"	3:24
Total length:		44:20

=== Special edition box set ===
- The box set was released on 30 September 2013. It includes the original album on LP and CD, a bonus CD, a 5-page music sheet for "The Curse", and a photographic artwork print.

Disc two
No.	Title	Length
1.	"The Curse" (instrumental version)
2.	"Aventine" (instrumental version)
3.	"Fuel to Fire" (instrumental version)

=== Deluxe version ===
- The deluxe version was released on 6 October 2014. It features three new songs, live versions from Berlin and Paris, and two remixes.

Disc two
No.	Title	Length
1.	"Under Giant Trees"	5:24
2.	"Arches"	3:24
3.	"September Song"	3:22
4.	"Run Cried the Crawling" (Live)	5:04
5.	"Chord Left" (Live)	2:31
6.	"Fuel to Fire" (Live)	5:07
7.	"Aventine" (Live)	4:27
8.	"Words Are Dead" (Live)	4:09
9.	"The Curse" (Live)	6:44
10.	"Dorian" (Daniel Matz rework)	3:51
11.	"Fuel To Fire" (David Lynch remix)	4:31
Total length:		48:34

== Charts ==
=== Weekly charts ===
Chart (2013)	Peak position
Austrian Albums (Ö3 Austria)	31
Belgian Albums (Ultratop Flanders)	1
Belgian Albums (Ultratop Wallonia)	2
Danish Albums (Hitlisten)	1
Dutch Albums (Album Top 100)	5
French Albums (SNEP)	2
German Albums (Offizielle Top 100)	24
Irish Albums (IRMA)	38
Norwegian Albums (VG-lista)	23
Polish Albums (ZPAV)	46
Swiss Albums (Schweizer Hitparade)	9
UK Albums (OCC)	63
US Billboard Top Heatseekers	28

=== Year-end charts ===
Chart (2013)	Position
Belgian Albums (Ultratop Flanders)	50
Belgian Albums (Ultratop Wallonia)	28
French Albums (SNEP)	48

Chart (2014)	Position
Belgian Albums (Ultratop Flanders)	85
Belgian Albums (Ultratop Wallonia)	52
French Albums (SNEP)	103

In 2014 it was awarded a diamond certification from the Independent Music Companies Association, which indicated sales of at least 200,000 copies throughout Europe.
