= Philharmonics (album) =

Studio album by Agnes Obel
- Released: 17 September 2010
- Recorded: 2008–2010 (Berlin, Germany)
- Genre: Folk; classical; indie pop
- Length: 39:51
- Label: PIAS
- Producer: Agnes Obel

Agnes Obel chronology
Philharmonics (2010)	Aventine (2013)

Singles from Philharmonics
- 1. "Riverside" Released: 30 May 2010; 2. "Just So" Released: 8 October 2010; 3. "Brother Sparrow" Released: 31 October 2011

Philharmonics is the debut studio album by Danish singer-songwriter Agnes Obel. It was released on 17 September 2010 by PIAS. The album received positive reviews from both Danish and international music critics. Philharmonics peaked at number one in Denmark and Belgium, and charted inside the top ten in France and the Netherlands. The album has sold 450,000 copies in Europe. The album includes the singles "Riverside", "Just So", and "Brother Sparrow".

== Composition ==
Obel cited Erik Satie as an influence on many of the compositions: "I am a huge fan of his work on silences. I like also his uses of repetitive sequences, almost hypnotic. That gives extremely strong pieces, calms and powerful at the same time."

According to the singer, "The texts come from the melody, its atmosphere, the piano (…) They also speak about the uncertainty of the future and undoubtedly of the feeling of loneliness, but without the anger which, for me, is not a musical engine".

Philharmonics's lyrics are simple, mysterious, and allegoric. Philippe Cornet says, "The texts in question sound like metaphors of love, death, impetuosities of nature or sudden rustles of the city."

Philharmonics contains three titles that are purely instrumental: "Falling, Catching", "Louretta" and "Wallflower".

== Promotion ==
"Just So" was used in a Deutsche Telekom commercial in Germany. Three songs from the album were on the soundtrack of the 2009 film Submarino. "Riverside" was used in the episode "Not Responsible" of Grey's Anatomy and in episode 12 of the second season of Offspring. It was again played in the episode "What Are You Doing Here, Ho-Bag?" from The CW hit series Ringer.

The ABC television show Revenge have used two songs from this album in their show. "Avenue" was played in the episode "Trust" and "Riverside" was played in the episode entitled "Duplicity".

The German director Markus Thoess used a couple of songs for the documentary Tod einer Scientologin - (Death of a Scientologist) that was broadcast in 2012 on NDR and Feb 2013 in ARD, first German Channel.

The first episode of the 2020 Danish mini-series Efterforskningen (The Investigation), used both "Riverside" and the John Cale cover "Close Watch".

== Reception ==
Professional ratings
Review scores
Source	Rating
The 405	8/10
AllMusic	4/5 stars
Drowned in Sound	7/10
The Independent	4/5 stars
MusicOMH	4/5 stars
The Skinny	4/5 stars

=== Critical reception ===
Philharmonics earned generally positive reviews with, for example, James Skinner from the BBC saying that "the compositions... are slow, sombre, sepulchral even, but not without a sense of occasionally singular beauty".

In the French cultural magazine Les Inrockuptibles, Johanna Seban speaks about a "disarming purity" and states, "There is, in these deeply melancholic ballads, the clearness and reassuring nobility of bedside discs."

In MusicOMH, Ben Edgell wrote, "Obel sings with a hushed and tender grace that waxes wistful and serene over yearning cello, harp, and piano vignettes. She's a fey siren, with a dusky, near-whispered vocal that speaks to Ane Brun or Eva Cassidy." In November 2011, she won five prizes at the Danish Music Awards for her album Philharmonics. She won Best Album of the Year, Best Pop Release of the Year, Best Debut Artist of the Year, Best Female Artist of the Year, and Best Songwriter of the Year.

=== Commercial performance ===
The album entered the charts at number four in Denmark on 15 October 2010. On its thirteenth week on the chart, on 7 January 2011, the album rose to number one and spent seven consecutive weeks at number one. It has since been certified six-times platinum by the International Federation of the Phonographic Industry (IFPI) for sales of 120,000 units. Philharmonics peaked at number one in France. It has since been certified platinum by the Syndicat National de l'Édition Phonographique (SNEP) for sales of 100,000 units. It also peaked at number one on the Belgian Albums Chart in Wallonia. Philharmonics has since been certified gold by the Belgian Entertainment Association (BEA) for sales of 10,000 units. In October 2011, it was awarded a diamond certification from the Independent Music Companies Association (IMPALA), which indicated sales in excess of 200,000 copies throughout Europe.

== Track listing ==
All tracks are written by Agnes Obel, except where noted.

No.	Title	Length
1.	"Falling, Catching"	1:33
2.	"Riverside"	3:48
3.	"Brother Sparrow"	3:58
4.	"Just So"	3:35
5.	"Beast"	3:50
6.	"Louretta"	2:06
7.	"Avenue"	4:07
8.	"Philharmonics"	3:33
9.	"Close Watch" (John Cale cover)	4:00
10.	"Wallflower"	2:26
11.	"Over the Hill"	2:48
12.	"On Powdered Ground"	4:07
Total length:		39:51

Danish iTunes bonus track
No.	Title	Length
13.	"Katie Cruel (traditional)"	2:59
Total length:		42:50

French digital bonus tracks
No.	Title	Length
13.	"Just So" (Instrumental)	3:35
14.	"Philharmonics" (Instrumental)	3:32
15.	"Over the Hill" (Live at White Session)	2:56
16.	"Smoke & Mirrors" (Live at White Session)	3:27
17.	"Just So" (Live at White Session)	4:04
Total length:		57:25

Deluxe edition bonus disc
No.	Title	Length
1.	"Smoke & Mirrors" (Live in Copenhagen)	3:40
2.	"Katie Cruel" (Live in Copenhagen)	4:47
3.	"Sons & Daughters" (Live in Copenhagen)	4:31
4.	"Louretta" (Live in Copenhagen)	3:20
5.	"Philharmonics" (Live in Copenhagen)	4:01
6.	"Close Watch" (Live in Copenhagen)	5:02
7.	"Avenue" (Piano Sessions)	4:05
8.	"Riverside" (Piano Sessions)	3:47
9.	"Brother Sparrow" (Piano Sessions)	3:57
10.	"Just So" (Piano Sessions)	3:32
11.	"On Powdered Ground" (Piano Sessions)	4:06
Total length:		44:48

== Charts ==
=== Weekly charts ===
Weekly chart performance for Philharmonics
Chart (2010–2011)	Peak position
Belgian Albums (Ultratop Flanders)	5
Belgian Albums (Ultratop Wallonia)	1
Danish Albums (Hitlisten)	1
Dutch Albums (Album Top 100)	8
French Albums (SNEP)	8
German Newcomers Chart	12
Swiss Albums (Schweizer Hitparade)	58

=== Year-end charts ===
2010 year-end chart performance for Philharmonics
Chart (2010)	Position
Danish Albums Chart	32

2011 year-end chart performance for Philharmonics
Chart (2011)	Position
Belgian Albums Chart (Flanders)	12
Belgian Albums Chart (Wallonia)	6
Danish Albums Chart	3
Dutch Albums Chart	52
French Albums Chart	62

2012 year-end chart performance for Philharmonics
Chart (2012)	Position
Danish Albums Chart	23

== Certifications ==
Region	Certification	Certified units/sales
Belgium (BRMA)	Platinum	30,000^{*}
Denmark (IFPI Danmark)	6× Platinum	120,000^{‡}
France (SNEP)	Platinum	100,000^{*}
Netherlands (NVPI)	Gold	25,000^{^}
^{*} Sales figures based on certification alone.^{^} Shipments figures based on certification alone.^{‡} Sales+streaming figures based on certification alone.

== Release history ==
List of release dates, showing country, record label, and format
Region	Date	Format(s)	Edition(s)	Label	Ref.
Germany	17 September 2010	CD; LP	Standard	PIAS Recordings	
Denmark	4 October 2010	CD	Standard	PIAS Recordings	
France	4 October 2010	CD; LP	Standard	PIAS Recordings	
Netherlands	22 October 2010	CD	Standard	PIAS Recordings	
United States	22 October 2010	Digital download	Standard	PIAS Recordings	
France	7 February 2011	Digital download	French digital bonus tracks	PIAS Recordings	
Germany	22 April 2011	CD	Deluxe	PIAS Recordings	
Denmark	2 May 2011	CD	Deluxe	PIAS Recordings	
