= Myopia (Agnes Obel album) =

Studio album by Agnes Obel
- Released: 21 February 2020
- Recorded: 2017–2020
- Genres: Chamber pop; jazz; classical; folk
- Length: 39:50
- Label: Strange Harvest Limited

Agnes Obel chronology
Late Night Tales: Agnes Obel (2018)	Myopia (2020)

Singles from Myopia
- 1. "Island of Doom" Released: 29 October 2019; 2. "Broken Sleep" Released: 7 January 2020

Myopia is the fourth studio album by Danish singer-songwriter Agnes Obel. It was released on 21 February 2020 by production studio Strange Harvest Limited. Three tracks were released as singles prior to the main release: "Island of Doom", "Broken Sleep" and "Parliament of Owls".

== Background ==
Obel explained the meaning of Myopia: "For me Myopia is an album about trust and doubt. Can you trust yourself or not? Can you trust your own judgments? Can you trust that you will do the right thing? Can you trust your instincts and what you are feeling? Or are your feelings skewed?"

== Style ==
In the album, Obel puts a feeling of quiet and gentleness in her music, continuing on from the German concept of Gläserner Bürger, the "citizen of glass", which was the guiding concept of her previous album. The album contains a new sense of solitude instrumentalism and vocals, as well as departing from her upbeat early albums. Obel stated the album was sparked by a struggle to escape her “own tunnel vision”.

== Reception ==
Professional ratings
Aggregate scores
Source	Rating
AnyDecentMusic?	6.9/10
Metacritic	74/100
Review scores
Source	Rating
AllMusic	3.5/5 stars
Financial Times	3/5 stars
The Independent	4/5 stars
musicOMH	3.5/5 stars
No Ripcord	7/10
PopMatters	8/10 stars
Pitchfork	7.1/10
Tom Hull – on the Web	B+

Myopia was met with generally positive reviews. The Independent reviewer Elisa Bray described it as "an album to experience alone, and there's a comfort to being pulled into Myopia's contemplative, isolating territory". Michael Sumsion from PopMatters said Obel's "ethereal and ornate sound channels" traditional forms of jazz, classical, and folk music through "crepuscular flecks of art-pop, trip-hop, and electronica to dazzling effect". Similarly, Pitchfork's Ashley Bardhan applauded the record's "ghostly, moody chamber pop" as "a new peak for her lush melancholy". Less enthusiastic was Financial Times critic Ludovic Hunter-Tilney, who found Obel's "pensive nocturnes" admirable but lamented how "the music rarely changes tempo" and "could do with more drama, less gracefulness".

== Track listing ==
All tracks are written by Agnes Obel.

Myopia track listing
No.	Title	Length
1.	"Camera's Rolling"	4:44
2.	"Broken Sleep"	4:55
3.	"Island of Doom"	5:29
4.	"Roscian"	2:17
5.	"Myopia"	5:16
6.	"Drosera"	2:27
7.	"Can't Be"	3:26
8.	"Parliament of Owls"	2:30
9.	"Promise Keeper"	4:29
10.	"Won't You Call Me"	4:17
Total length:		39:50

== Charts ==
=== Weekly charts ===
Weekly chart performance for Myopia
Chart (2020)	Peak position
Austrian Albums (Ö3 Austria)	19
Belgian Albums (Ultratop Flanders)	11
Belgian Albums (Ultratop Wallonia)	6
Danish Albums (Hitlisten)	11
Dutch Albums (Album Top 100)	15
German Albums (Offizielle Top 100)	9
Polish Albums (ZPAV)	39
Portuguese Albums (AFP)	33
Scottish Albums (Official Charts)	15
Spanish Albums (PROMUSICAE)	33
Swiss Albums (Schweizer Hitparade)	5
UK Albums (Official Charts)	34

=== Year-end charts ===
Year-end chart performance for Myopia
Chart (2020)	Position
Belgian Albums (Ultratop Wallonia)	186
