= Let's Part in Style =

Studio album by Chinawoman
- Released: February 24, 2014
- Genre: Experimental, nouvelle chanson, dark-romantic euromance
- Label: Self-released
- Producer: Chinawoman

Chinawoman chronology
Show Me The Face (2010)	Let's Part in Style (2014)	Exciting Times (2018)

Let's Part in Style is the third studio album of Canadian performer Chinawoman.

It was released on February 24, 2014. All tracks were written, performed and produced by Chinawoman.

== Tracks ==
1. Vacation from Love
2. Good Times Don't Carry Over
3. Woman is Still a Woman
4. To Be With Others
5. Where Goes The Night
6. What Was Said
7. Nothing to Talk About
8. Blue Eyes Unchanged
9. Waltz #1
10. Let's Part in Style

== Personnel ==
To Be With Others and Where Goes The Night produced by Chinawoman and Van Roland.

- Chinawoman: vocals, synthesizers, guitars
- Van Roland: electric guitar & sfx on Vacation & To Be With Others
- Sam Cino: drums & percussion engineered and performed on Nothing to Talk About and Blue Eyes Unchanged
- Diego Ferri: lead guitar on To Be With Others
- André Tremblay: spoken word section on Nothing to Talk About and translation into French

Mixed by Chinawoman except 4, 5 & 8 mixed by Van Roland, 2 & 7 mixed by Peter Jensen and 3 & 10 mixed by Diego Ferri. Mastered by Diego Ferri. Album design by Áron Jancsó.
