= Late Night Tales: Agnes Obel =

Compilation album by Agnes Obel
- Released: May 25, 2018
- Genre: Classical; jazz; folk; indie pop
- Length: 50:22
- Label: Night Time Stories
- Producer: Agnes Obel

Agnes Obel chronology
Citizen of Glass (2016)	Late Night Tales: Agnes Obel (2018)	Myopia (2020)

Late Night Tales chronology
Late Night Tales: BadBadNotGood (2017)	Late Night Tales: Agnes Obel (2018)	Late Night Tales: Floating Points (2019)

Professional ratings
Review scores
Source	Rating
AllMusic	4/5 stars

Late Night Tales: Agnes Obel is a compilation album curated and performed by Agnes Obel for Late Night Tales series, released by Night Time Stories on 25 May 2018. It features artists such as Nina Simone, Henry Mancini, Ray Davies, Michelle Gurevich, Can, and Yello, among many others. Three previously unheard songs from Obel appear in the mix, including “Poem About Death”, a collaboration with the Danish poet Inger Christensen. Critics compared the album with David Lynch's work.

Obel wrote about her album, "I was surprised at how much time I ended up spending on this. I collected all the songs together with my partner Alex and we just spent time listening to records, trying to see what would fit together. Some of the music I’ve included here is on mixtapes we made when we were just friends as teenagers. Each one of the tracks produces stories in my head."

== Track listing ==
No.	Title	Writer(s)	Artist	Length
1.	"The Evil Theme"	Henry Mancini	Mancini	3:02
2.	"Moonbird"	Roger Webb	Webb	2:22
3.	"Eden's Island"	eden ahbez	ahbez	2:12
4.	"The Nights"	Lee Hazlewood	Hazlewood	3:24
5.	"Ay Ay Ay Ay" (Angle-Lala)	Arthur Reid	Nora Dean	3:07
6.	"Great Mission"	Boris Blank, Dieter Meier	Yello	2:55
7.	"Aleluia"		Quarteto em Cy and Tamba Trio	3:30
8.	"Bloody Shadows from a Distance"	Lena Platonos	Platonos	3:04
9.	"I Go to Sleep"	Ray Davies	Davies	2:48
10.	"Piano Quintet, V"	Alfred Schnittke	Schnittke	3:55
11.	"Stretch Your Eyes" (Ambient Acapella)	Agnes Obel	Obel	6:07
12.	"Pilentze Pee" (Pilentze Sings)		the Bulgarian State Radio and Television Female Choir	2:27
13.	"Glemmer Du" (Exclusive Arvid Müller Cover Version)	Kai Normann Andersen, Arvid Müller	Obel	2:02
14.	"Bee Dance" (Exclusive)	Obel	Obel	2:39
15.	"The End"	Sibylle Baier	Baier	2:27
16.	"Party Girl"	Michelle Gurevich	Gurevich	4:26
17.	"Oscura Primavera"	Holger Czukay, David C. Johnson, Michael Karoli, Jaki Liebezeit, Irmin Schmidt	Can	3:14
18.	"I Lie"	David Lang	Lang	5:12
19.	"Images" (Live in New York 1964)	Waring Cuney, Nina Simone	Simone	2:51
20.	"Poem About Death" (Exclusive Spoken Words With Music)	Obel	Obel	3:04
21.	"Late Night Tales: Agnes Obel" (Continuous Mix)		Obel	50:31

DJ mix
No.	Title	Artist	Length
1.	"The Evil Theme" (Mixed)	Mancini	2:02
2.	"Moonbird (From "Heaven & Hell")" (Mixed)	Webb	1:45
3.	"Eden's Island" (Mixed)	ahbez	2:01
4.	"The Nights" (Mixed)	Hazlewood	3:02
5.	"Angie La La" (Mixed)	Dean	3:00
6.	"Great Mission" (Mixed)	Yello	1:41
7.	"Aleluia" (Mixed)	Quarteto em Cy and Tamba Trio	3:28
8.	"Bloody Shadows from a Afar" (Mixed)	Platonos	3:08
9.	"I Go to Sleep (Demo Version)" (Mixed)	The Kinks	2:39
10.	"Piano Quintet: V. Moderato Pastorale" (Mixed)	Roland Pöntinen and Tale Quartet	3:02
11.	"Stretch Your Eyes (Ambient Acapella)" (Mixed)	Obel	1:35
12.	"Pilentze Pee" (Mixed)	Bulgarian State Radio and Television Female Choir	1:36
13.	"Glemmer Du" (Mixed)	Obel	2:06
14.	"Bee Dance" (Mixed)	Obel	2:00
15.	"The End" (Mixed)	Baier	2:25
16.	"Party Girl" (Mixed)	Gurevich	3:16
17.	"Oscura Primavera" (Mixed)	Can	1:55
18.	"I Lie" (Mixed)	Ars Nova Copenhagen and Paul Hillier	2:36
19.	"Images (Live in New York 1964)" (Mixed)	Simone	3:10
20.	"Poem About Death" (Mixed)	Obel	3:54
