= Kurt Fiebig =

German composer

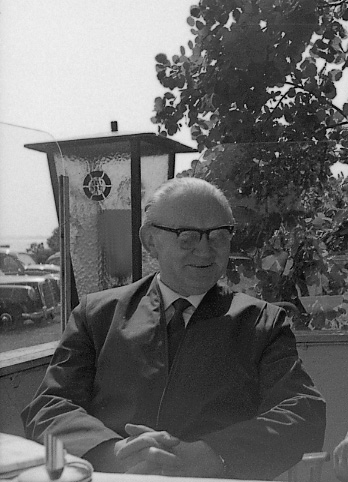
Kurt Fiebig

Kurt Fiebig (29 February 1908 – 12 October 1988) was a German composer, church musician and professor at the Hochschule für Musik und Theater Hamburg.

== Life and career ==
Fiebig was born in Berlin as the son of a military musician. His parents, whose father was an oboist in the 2nd Guards Regiment on Foot, brought him into contact with music at an early age. From the age of six he received piano lessons and accompanied his father to the violin. He attended the traditional Berlinisches Gymnasium zum Grauen Kloster up to the Abitur.

Fiebig gained important musical impressions as a choirboy in the Staats- und Domchor Berlin under Hugo Rüdel. He returned from a concert tour of this choir in Switzerland with the decision to learn to play the organ and to become a church musician. In the church of St. Bartholomew in Berlin, he received lessons in music theory, harmony and counterpoint from the church musician Rudolf Fischer for which he was well known. Fiebig taught himself how to play the organ and soon performed large parts of the organist's duties. From 1925 onwards, Fiebig received instruction in artistic organ playing from Fischer's friend, church music director Arnold Dreyer. Johann Sebastian Bach, and became Dreyer's assistant at the church of St. Georgen near Alexanderplatz. From 1923 to 1929, i.e. from the age of fifteen, Fiebig worked part-time as organist in the Berlin-Moabit cell prison.

In 1925, after consulting Georg Schünemann, Fiebig took private lessons in counterpoint and harmony with Karol Rathaus, a Franz Schreker student, in order to prepare himself for composition studies at the university. Rathaus attested him in a report from November 1927 "musical and theoretical abilities that go far beyond the ordinary and give rise to the best hopes". He had "especially [...] made progress in counterpoint." Fiebig's church music influence was obvious; Rathaus writes:

"He grew up in the church, and it speaks for the genuineness of his personality that his stylistic changes, which mark his young path, are all borne by this childhood experience and – in a higher sense – are likely to give direction to Fiebig's further development. " Rathaus suggested to Fiebig that he study with Karl Straube at the Leipzig Conservatory (today University of Music and Theatre Leipzig), a centre of church music.

However, Fiebig decided to attend the Berlin Berlin University of the Arts and to study with Franz Schreker, who was particularly respected in Fiebig's eyes as a composer and teacher. Fiebig initially belonged to the Schreker class at the Hochschule, but still studied in 1932/33 in the master class for composition led by Schreker at the Prussian Academy of Arts.

Fiebig attended the college from October 1926 to July 1927 and from October 1928 to July 1931; his teachers also included Curt Sachs (instrumental studies), Max Seiffert (early music) and George Szell (score playing). The interruption arose because Fiebig was seeking a church music degree alongside his university studies. He only partially passed the examination for organists and choral conductors in January 1928 before an examination board chaired by Hans Joachim Moser and Wolfgang Reimann, with a weak point seen precisely in subjects in which he excelled at college: In theory and composition.

At the Hochschule, Fiebig was one of the best students. In 1931, he won the Mendelssohn Prize for composition. He had submitted two chamber works: a trio for flute, violin and harpsichord and a sonata for viola and piano (the Duo for piano and viola). Schreker issued a handwritten certificate to his pupil in December 1932, probably at the conclusion of the studies:

"Highly recommend my student Kurt Fiebig. He is a quite excellent musician, highly gifted as a composer, a very good organist and piano player, conscientious and diligent. He will fully fill his place in any position in the field of his ability. Schreker."

In fact, Schreker trusted Fiebig's abilities, even on his own account. He entrusted him with the preparation of the piano reduction for his opera Der Schmied von Gent, which was published by Universal Edition in Vienna.

Around 1930, Fiebig achieved his first public successes as a composer. In 1931, for example, his music for orchestra was presented at an event of the Internationale Gesellschaft für Neue Musik (IGNM) in Bad Pyrmont. He received commissions for stage music from the Konzerthaus Berlin and established contacts with radio stations. He composed commissioned radio play music, cantatas and organ pieces. Works of chamber music were heard in the programme Musik von heute. Work for radio continued until 1938, but was hampered by the latent suspicion of musical Bolshevism after the National Socialist seizure of power.

There is a retrospective statement about Fiebig's relationship with his teacher Schreker, which was reproduced in a Hamburg district newspaper in 1954:

"The four to six students who made up his Schreker's class were as different from each other as possible. Schreker never made the slightest attempt to impose a particular compositional style on us. With admirable objectivity, he directed each one in the way that suited his idiosyncrasy.".

Such respectful remarks are made by a pupil whose pre-study imprint was by no means Schreker's and who, during his studies, was seized by the church-musical spirit of optimism that can hardly be associated with Schreker's personality and œuvre. Fiebig's rootedness in Protestant Christianity, influenced by the contemporary currents of the twenties, led to a decided turning away from Art for art's sake. "I have never liked composing without a commission. [ ... ] We no longer believe that art should be pursued 'for its own sake'," he later explained.

With the turn away from the late Romantic, the turn towards liturgy and modal tonality, a renewal of church music began around 1930, for which Fiebig was enthusiastic. Like other representatives of this movement, he looked to Paul Hindemith as a role model. Hindemith had held a composition class alongside Schreker at the Berlin Hochschule since May 1927. Fiebig would have liked to switch to Hindemith in 1928 – or thereafter. Feelings of loyalty to Schreker, however, kept him away. He considered it such a great honour to be allowed to study with Schreker that he could not have expressed his wish openly at the time. With a fellow student under Schreker, Fiebig formed a singing circle that rehearsed the compositions written under Schreker – motets, choral movements, Lieder and canons – and certainly judged them from a different perspective than Schreker.

From 1933 to 1936, Fiebig, who married in 1934 and became the father of three sons, was cantor and organist at St. Elisabeth in Berlin. In 1936, he followed a call to Quedlinburg as cathedral organist and at the same time became a lecturer at the church music school in Aschersleben, which was moved to Halle/Saale in 1938. In 1937, compositions by Fiebig, who belonged to the German Christians, were performed at the Festival of German Church Music in Berlin. In 1941, Fiebig took over the direction of the Evangelische Hochschule für Kirchenmusik Halle, which he retained after the end of the war. During this time, he wrote numerous choral and organ works for use in church services, as well as larger cantatas such as the Hallische Kantate vom Wort Gottes, which was premiered with the choir of the church music school in Halle in 1939.

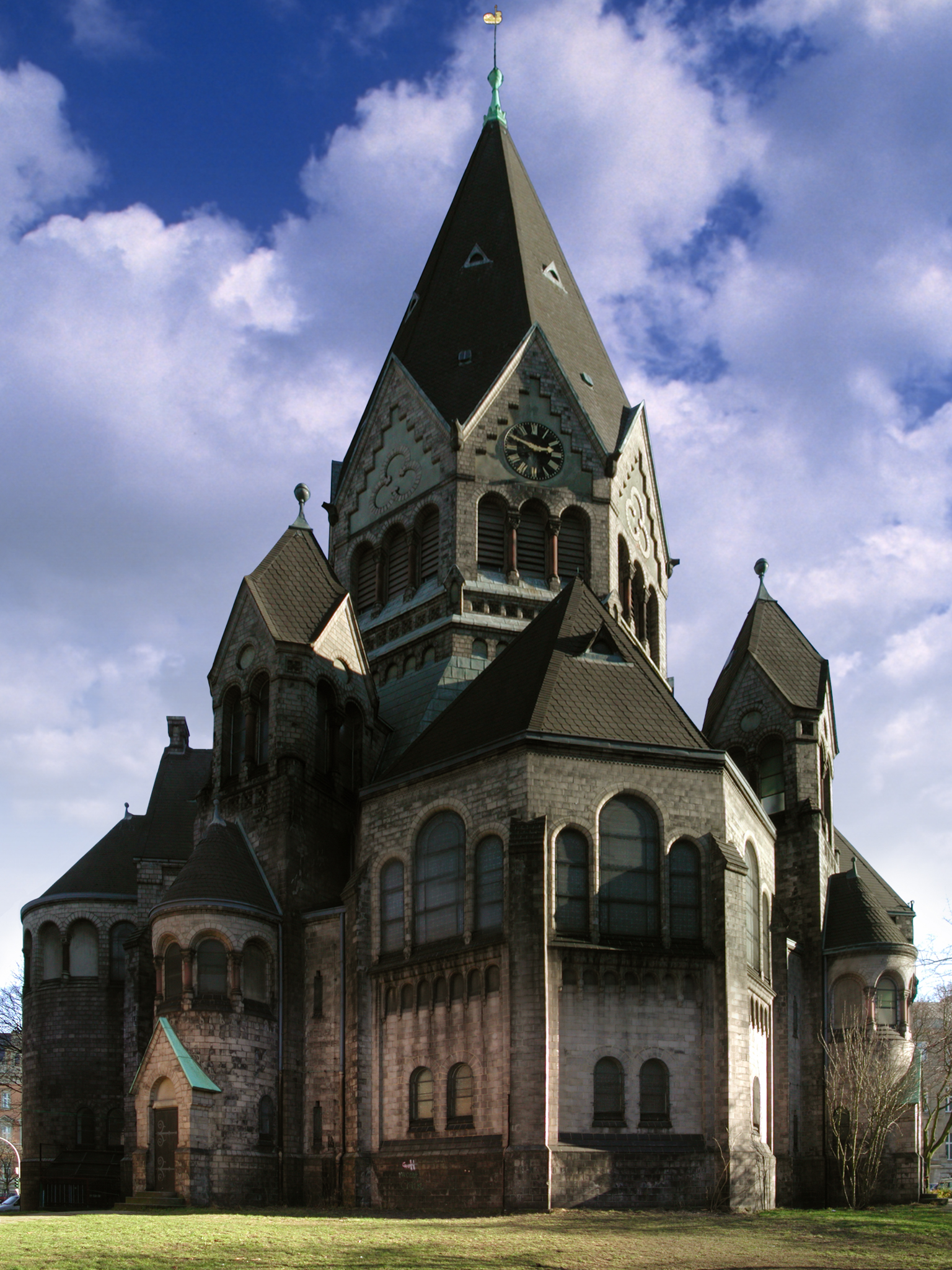
Gnadenkirche zu Hamburg-St.Pauli

Tired of organisational tasks, Fiebig left the GDR in 1951 and went to Hamburg. There, he worked as a church musician at the Gnadenkirche in St. Pauli (1951–1968) and at the church of St. Ansgar in Langenhorn (1969–1974). From 1960 to 1980, he was a lecturer and professor of composition and ear training at the Hochschule für Musik und Theater Hamburg. During the time of his move from Halle to Hamburg, he composed one of his major works, the St Mark Passion for two choirs a cappella and soloists. In Hamburg, Fiebig composed further church music: the Easter Oratorio, the Advent Oratorio (Annunciation), the choral cantata Wie nach einer Wasserquelle, the Messe Media Vita, the song cycle Jahrkreis der Liebe and the cantata Et unam sanctam, to name only the most important. Even during his last ten years in retirement, Fiebig did what he had done almost every Sunday since his youth: he took over organ substitutions and accompanied oratorio performances on the harpsichord.

"Kurt Fiebig, a pupil of Schreker, does not shy away from seeing himself as a successor to Paul Hindemith," reads a tribute to his 75th birthday; Fiebig himself described Hindemith as the "greatest living composer" of the 1920s and even placed him above Béla Bartók, Igor Stravinsky and Arnold Schoenberg.

Fiebig's older sister Eva Fiebig was a well-known actress, his sister Irma Brandes, who was married to the National Socialist mayor of Cologne Robert Brandes, was a journalist and writer whose poems Fiebig set to music.

Fiebig died on 12 October 1988 in Jenfeld at the age of 80.

== Work ==
- 1930: Duo für Klavier und Bratsche. Dedicated to Rudolph Schmidt
- 1939: Hallische Kantate vom Wort Gottes. For solos, mixed choir, orchestra and organ.
- 1950: St Mark Passion. For soli and mixed choir a cappella
- 1954: Easter Oratorio. Based on the last chapter of the Gospel of Luke, for 3 soloists (evangelist [baritone], tenor and bass) and 3 choirs a cappella.
- 1954/55: Jahrkreis der Liebe song cycle after poems by Ricarda Huch
- 1955: Wie nach einer Wasserquelle. Choral cantata for soprano, alto and baritone solo, mixed choir, flute, oboe, bassoon, string orchestra and organ.
- 1957: Advent Oratorio (The Annunciation). Based on the 1st chapter of the Gospel of Luke (verse 5–80), for solos, mixed choir and organ.
- 1957: Et unam sanctam. Cantata for soprano, tenor and baritone solo, 4- to 6-part mixed choir, flute, oboe, clarinet, bassoon, 2 trumpets, trombone, timpani, string orchestra and organ.
- 1965: Du meine Seele, singe. Paul Gerhardt Cantata for soli, choir, orchestra and organ.
- 1966: Gib dich zufrieden und sei stille. Paul Gerhardt Cantata for soprano, alto and baritone solo, mixed choir, flute, oboe, clarinet, bassoon, 2 trumpets, timpani, string orchestra and organ.

== Sources ==
This article by Angelika Fiebig-Dreyer is courtesy of the Berlin University of the Arts, taken from Franz Schrekers Schüler in Berlin, Biographical contributions and documents; writings from the UdK archive, vol. 8, 2005, pp. 21–25.

The entire estate of Kurt Fiebig is in the archive of the UdK Berlin.
