= Oskar Sala =

German musician (1910–2002)

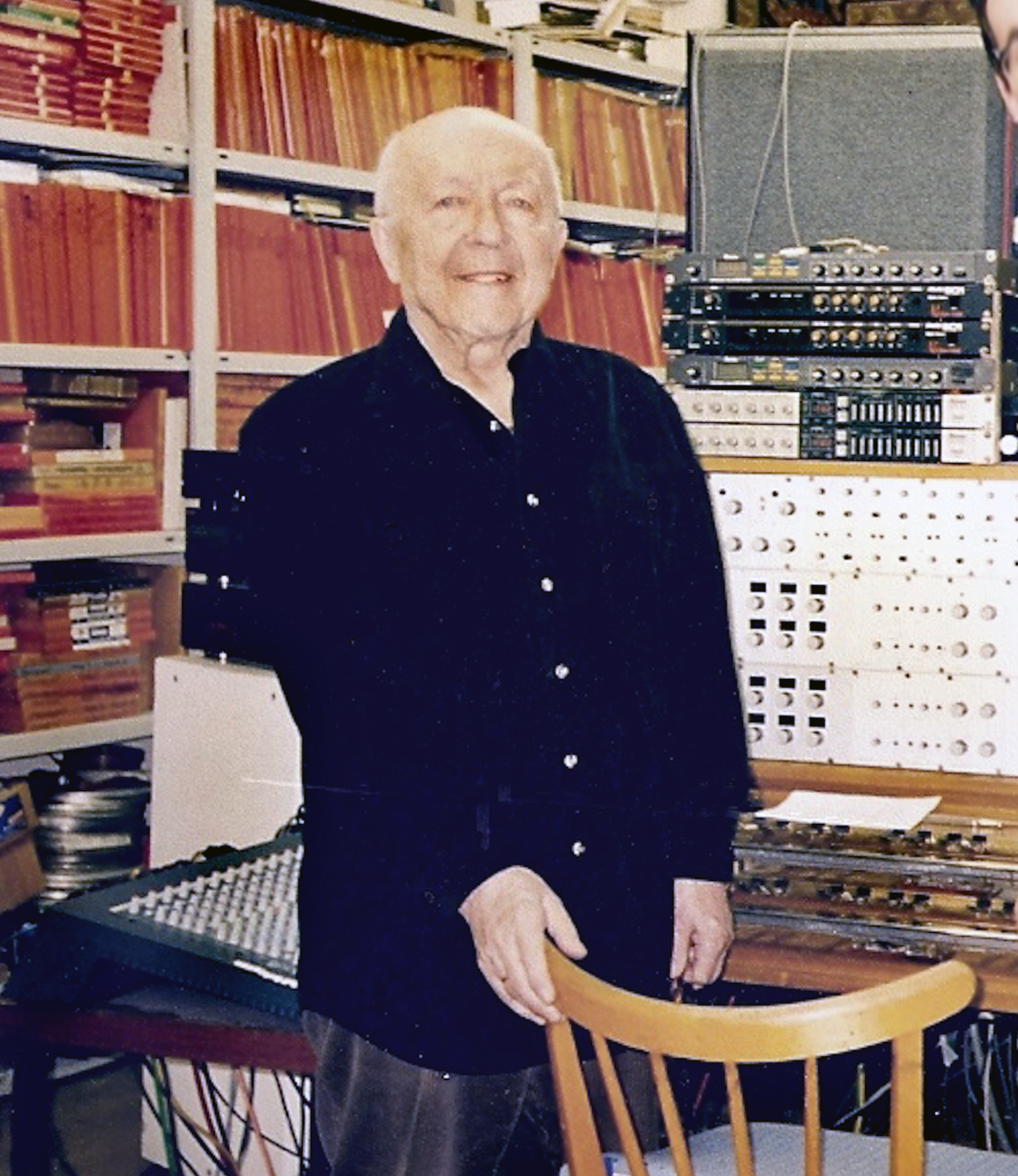
- Sala in his studio (1996)
- Born: 18 July 1910; Greiz, German Empire
- Died: 26 February 2002 (aged 91); Berlin, Germany

Oskar Sala (18 July 1910 – 26 February 2002) was a German composer and a pioneer of electronic music. He played an instrument called the Trautonium, an early form of electronic synthesizer.

== Early life ==
Sala was born in Greiz, Thuringia, Germany. He studied piano and organ during his youth, performing classical piano concerts as a teenager. In 1929, he moved to Berlin to study piano and composition with composer and violist Paul Hindemith at the Berlin Conservatory. He also followed the experiments of Dr. Friedrich Trautwein, at the school's laboratory, learning to play with Trautwein's pioneer electronic instrument, the Trautonium.

On 20 June 1930 Sala and Paul Hindemith gave a public performance at the Berliner Musikhochschule Hall called “Neue Musik Berlin 1930″ to introduce the Trautonium. Later Sala toured Germany with the Trautonium; in 1931 he was the soloist in a performance of Hindemith's Concert for Trautonium with String Quartet. He also soloed in the debut of Hindemith student Harald Genzmer's “Concert for Trautonium AND Orchestra”.

Sala studied physics at the University of Berlin between 1932 and 1935. He helped to develop the "Volkstrautonium", a Trautonium that Telefunken hoped to popularize. In 1935 he built a "Radio-Trautonium", and in 1938 a portable model, the "Konzerttrautonium".

Oskar Sala was a soldier during the Nazi era. He was on the Eastern Front during World War II, where he was injured.

== Mixtur-Trautonium ==
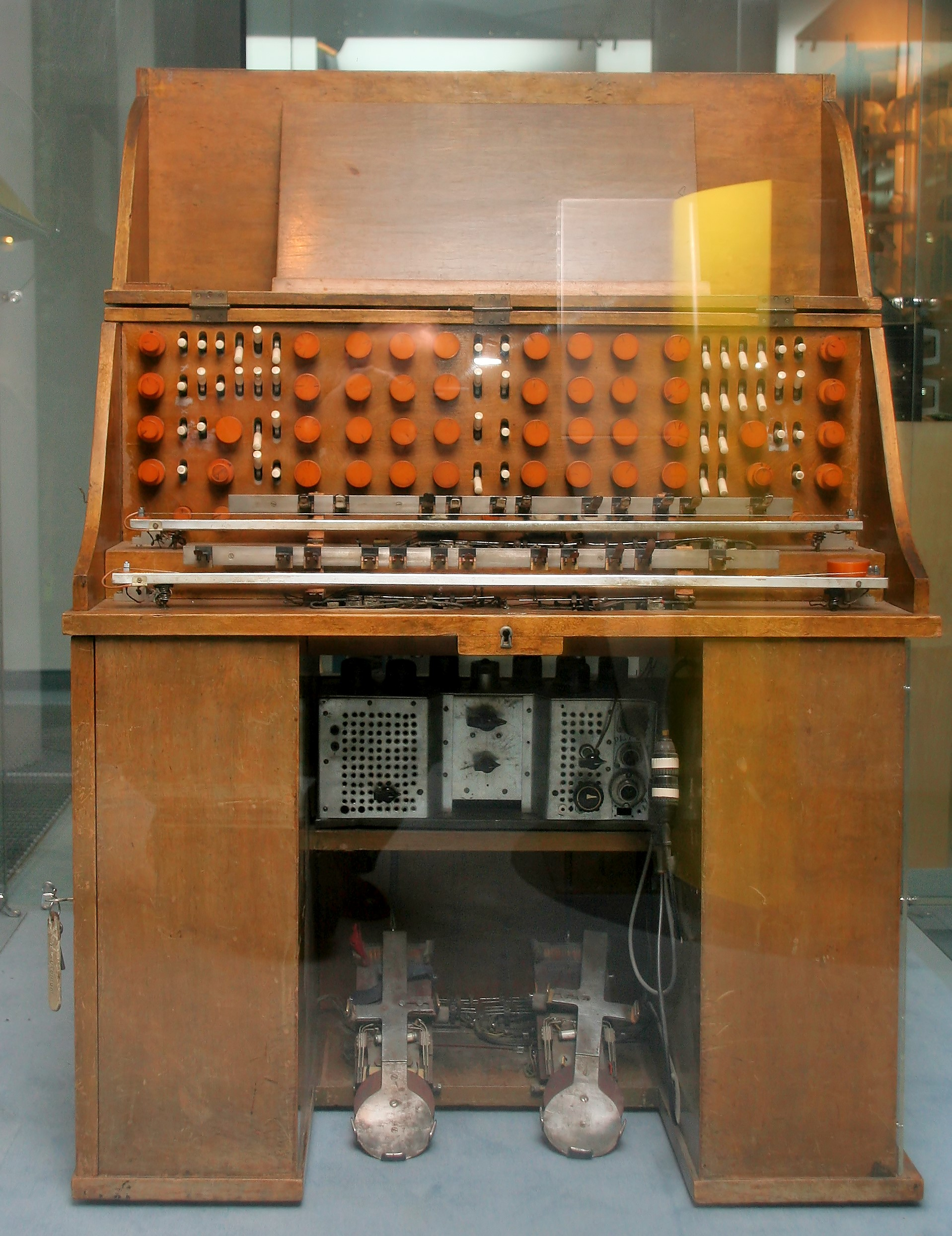
Mixtur-Trautonium, 1952

In 1948, Sala further developed the Trautonium into the Mixtur-Trautonium. Sala's invention opened the field of subharmonics, the symmetric counterpart to overtones, so that a thoroughly distinct tuning evolved. Pioneering music therapist Maria Schüppel studied and worked with Sala during the 1950s.

Sala presented his new instrument to the public in 1952 and would soon receive international licenses for its circuits. That same year, Harald Genzmer delivered the score to the first Concert For Mixtur-Trautonium And Grand Orchestra.

In the 1950s Sala also built the Quartett-Trautonium.

== Film work ==
In the 1940s and 1950s, he worked on many film scores. In 1958, he established his own studio at Mars film GmbH (4th incarnation) in Berlin. It was there that he produced electronic soundtracks for such films as Veit Harlan's Different from You and Me (1957), Rolf Thiele's Rosemary (1959), and Fritz Lang's Das Indische Grabmal (1959).

He created the non-musical soundtrack for Alfred Hitchcock's film The Birds. He received many awards for his film scores, but he never won an Oscar. He also did much work on German commercials, most notably one referred to as HB's little man.

He was an honorary Senator of Berlin.

== Legacy ==
On 18 July 2022, Google celebrated his 112th birthday with a Google Doodle.

== Discography ==
- Trautonium-Konzerte

(Wergo WER 286 266–2)
Harald Genzmer's Konzert für Trautonium und Orchester (Concerto for Trautonium and Orchestra) (1938/39) and Konzert für Mixtur-Trautonium und großes Orchester (Concerto for Mixtur-Trautonium and Large Orchestra) (1952)

- My Fascinating Instrument

(Erdenklang 90340)
Contains his own compositions, dating from 1955 to 1989

- Subharmonische Mixturen

(Erdenklang 70962)
Contains Paul Hindemith's Langsames Stueck für Orchester und Rondo für Trautonium (Slow Piece for Orchestra And Rondo for Trautonium), Sala's own compositions, dating from 1992 to 1995, and his soundtrack to Der Wuerger von Schloss Dartmore (The Strangler of Castle Dartmore)

- Elektronische Impressionen

(Telefunken 6.40023 AP)
Hindemith's 7 Triostuecke für drei Trautonien (7 Triopieces for three Trautonien), Konzertstueck fuer Trautonium und Streicher (Concertpiece for Trautonium And Strings) written in 1931 and recorded in 1977. Also contains Sala's Elektronische Impressionen (Electronic Impressions), 1978.

- Resonanzen

(1970, re-release 1994, Originalton West OW027)
Contains Suite für Mixtur-Trautonium und elektronisches Schlagwerk and Resonanzen: Konzertante Musik für Mixtur-Trautonium und Elektronisches Orchester.

== Literature ==
- Peter Donhauser (2007). Elektrische Klangmaschinen. Boehlau Vienna (in German).
- Peter Badge (2000). Oskar Sala:Pionier der elektronischen Musik. Satzwerk, 100pp. ISBN 3-930333-34-1
- Pablo Freire / Audionautas (2011/2012). Oskar Sala. El último artesano. Parts 1234 (in Spanish)

== See also ==
- Raymond Scott, an American with a comparable career, and his own early electronic instrument the electronium.
