= Eberhard Wenzel =

German public health researcher (1950–2001)

Eberhard R. Wenzel (2 January 1950 – 20 September 2001) was a public health researcher, a co-founder of the WWW Virtual Library: Public Health, and an advocate of the socio-ecological view of health promotion as described in the Ottawa Charter for Health Promotion. He was a Senior Lecturer of International Health at Griffith University, and Deputy Director of Queensland Centre for Public Health. Griffith University's "Eberhard Wenzel Scholarship for International Public Health" and The Australian Health Promotion Association's "Eberhard Wenzel Memorial Oration" are named in his honour.

Born in Heringen, Hesse, West Germany, Wenzel worked as a researcher, lecturer and consultant at various universities and institutes in Germany, in the fields of educational technology, media didactics and sociology. He worked in collaboration with the World Health Organization, European Centre for Social Welfare Training and Research and several other organisations researching health education and health promotion. He later moved, first to the Philippines where he taught at the University of the Philippines, and then to Australia as a lecturer at Griffith University in Brisbane.

Eberhard Wenzel co-founded the Public Health section of the World Wide Web Virtual Library, which during the period in which he moderated it, earned a rating of the best in the field by the medical journal The Lancet.

Throughout 2001, Eberhard Wenzel shared his battle with cancer by setting up a "healing circle" and "The Big C Report" on his website. His last entry occurred on 17 September that year, only three days before he died . His website, which contains more than 800 separate pages covering a wide range of topics, has been preserved as it was on 17 September 2001 as a memorial to his life and work.

== Selected publications ==
- Bültemeier, C., Franzkowiak, P., Hildebrandt, H. & Wenzel, E. (1984), Gesundheitsbewußte Trends und Projekte in den Alltagskulturen Jugendlicher und junger Erwachsener im Alter von 12–25 Jahren (Positive Gesundheitsansätze). Studie im Auftrag der Bundeszentrale für gesundheitliche Aufklärung. Heidelberg (Forschungsgruppe Jugend & Gesundheit (unveröff. Projektbericht))
- Langer, H. & Wenzel, E. (1987), Gesundheitsförderung am Arbeitsplatz. Dokumentation von Projekten und Angebote für Betriebe. (Studie im Auftrag und mit Mitteln der Bundeszentrale für gesundheitliche Aufklärung, Köln.). Köln (Forschungsgruppe Gesundheitsförderung, unveröff. Projektbericht)
- Wenzel, E. (1984), Smoking and health. A cultural approach for an educational programme. Paper on behalf of WHO Clearinghouse on Smoking and Health and the International Union for Health Education, Regional Office for Europe. Cologne (Research Group Youth & Health)
- Wenzel, E. (1984), Entwicklung eines Hessischen Programms zur Gesundheitsförderung. Bericht über eine Klausurtagung des Hessischen Ministers für Arbeit, Umwelt und Soziales, Schlangenbad, November 1984. Köln (Forschungsgruppe Jugend & Gesundheit)
- Wenzel, E. (1985), "Let's go shopping." Health workshops for youth. (Paper on behalf of UNESCO, Division of Science and Technical Education, Nutrition and Health Education, Contract No. 105.309.4). Cologne (Forschungsgruppe Jugend & Gesundheit)
- Wenzel, E. (1986), Methodology for the design and evaluation of extension programmes. Paper carried out on behalf of UNESCO, Division of Science, Technical and Environmental Education, Nutrition and Health Education (Contract 105.592.5 ED/STE/Cont.). Cologne (Research Group Youth and Health)
