= Michelle Gurevich =

Canadian singer-songwriter

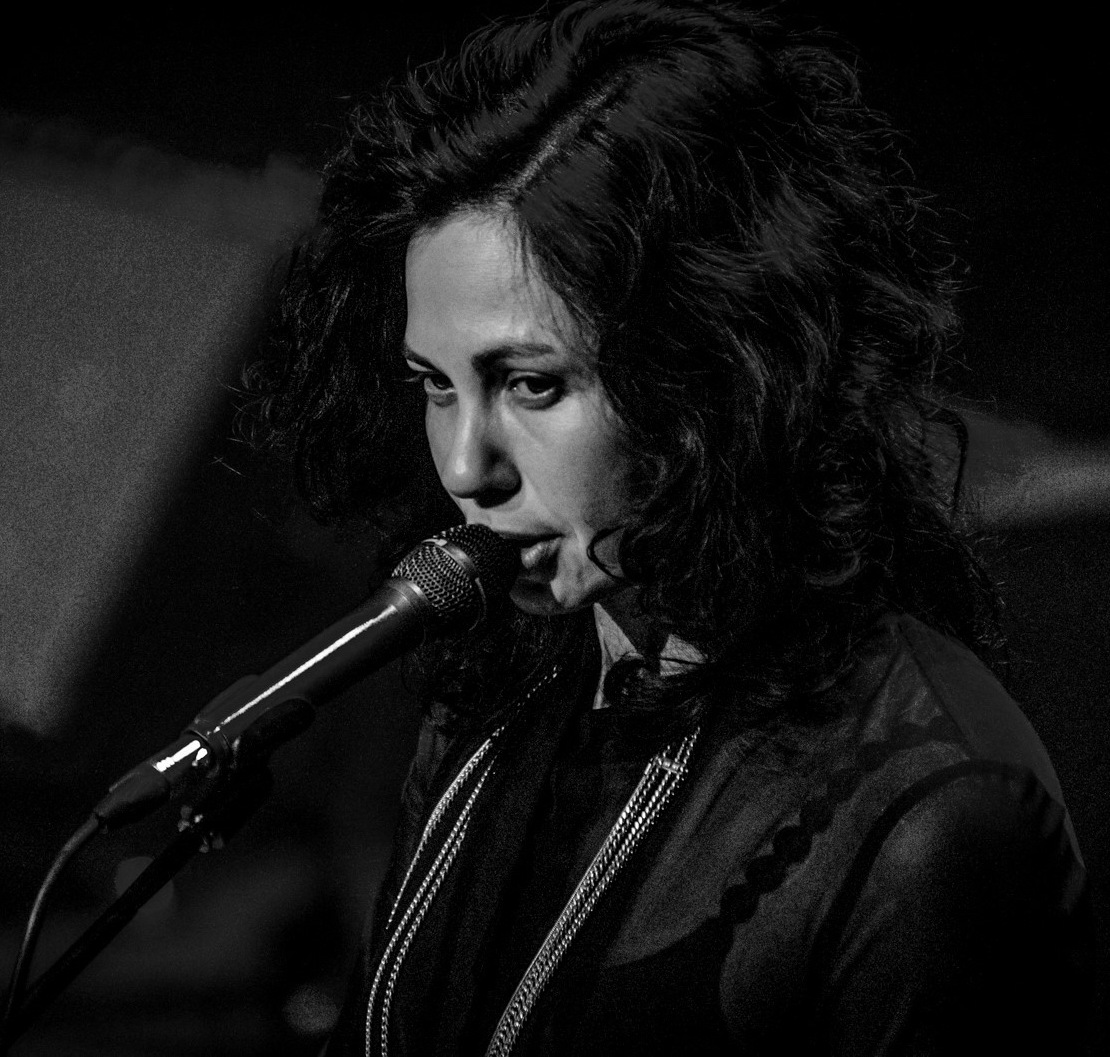

Background information
- Also known as: Chinawoman
- Born: Toronto, Ontario, Canada
- Genres: Sadcore, lo-fi, Indie pop, Art pop, Folk
- Instrument(s): Vocals, keyboard, guitar, synthesizer
- Years active: 2005–present
- Website: www.michellegurevich.com

Michelle Gurevich is a Canadian singer-songwriter, also known by her former stage name Chinawoman. Her music is influenced by her Russian heritage, and has been described as slowcore rock and "lo-fi pop". She performed regularly in Russia, and her largest fanbase is in Eastern Europe.

== Life ==
Gurevich was born in Toronto, Ontario, to Russian-Jewish immigrants and was raised with Russian as her first language. Her father was an engineer in Soviet Leningrad and her mother a Kirov ballerina (the subject of Gurevich's "Russian Ballerina"). Gurevich originally wanted to become a filmmaker and worked ten years in the industry before turning to music. "I eventually tried to write a song and found it was not only cheaper but much easier to get a good result."

Gurevich began her career recording in her bedroom. The stage name "Chinawoman" was chosen as a spur-of-the-moment joke when GarageBand prompted her for a band name. After receiving criticism for being a non-Chinese woman inappropriately using the word Chinawoman, Gurevich distanced herself from her stage name and began to perform under her own name.

Gurevich has cited Alla Pugacheva, Adriano Celentano, Charles Aznavour, Yoko Ono, Leonard Cohen, Francis Lai, Nino Rota, Xavier Dolan, Todor Kobakov, Jennifer Castle, and filmmaker Federico Fellini as influences on her music. Gurevich possesses a contralto range.

In 2011, Gurevich was invited to tour Europe as an opening act for Patrick Wolf.

In 2012, "Lovers are Strangers" was the theme song for the Latvian film Kolka Cool.

In 2013, "Russian Ballerina" was featured on the commercial for the Nokia Lumia 1020.

In 2014, Gurevich's song "Party Girl" and "I'll Be Your Woman" inspired the 2014 French film Party Girl.

In 2020, Gurevich moved to Copenhagen, Denmark, with her Danish wife and their 2-year-old daughter.

In 2022, "Feel More" was the theme song for the American documentary miniseries Keep Sweet: Pray and Obey.

On August 30, 2023, she announced the cancellation of the fall tour due to being "not well enough to perform".

== Discography ==
=== Singles ===
- 2008: "Russian Ballerina"
- 2013: "Kiss in Taksim Square"
- 2019: "Poison In My Mind"
- 2020: "Love From A Distance"
- 2021: "No One Answer"
- 2021: "Ho Fatto L'amore Con Me"
- 2021: "Losing Touch"
- 2021: "Forever Awkward"
- 2022: "Goodbye My Dictator"
- 2022: "Aliens Wanna Touch"

=== Studio albums ===
Title	Album details
Party Girl	Released: 1 April 2007; Label: Self-released; Formats: CD, digital download, LP
Show Me the Face	Released: 25 March 2010; Label: Self-released; Formats: CD, digital download, LP
Let's Part in Style	Released: 24 February 2014; Label: Self-released; Formats: CD, digital download, LP
New Decadence	Released: 28 September 2016; Label: Self-released; Formats: digital download, LP
Exciting Times	Released: 9 November 2018; Label: Self-released; Formats: CD, digital download, LP; Note: Rereleased in July 2023 with new album cover
Ecstasy in the Shadow of Ecstasy	Released: 15 May 2020; Label: Self-released; Formats: CD, digital download, LP
It Was the Moment	Released: 6 November 2024; Label: Self-released; Formats: digital download, LP
