= ...And You Will Know Us by the Trail of Dead discography =

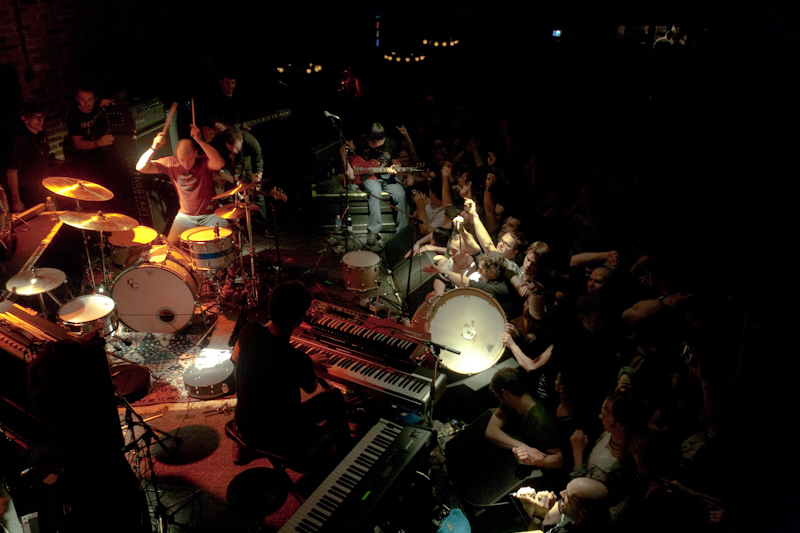
- ...And You Will Know Us by the Trail of Dead in 2009
- Studio albums: 11
- EPs: 5
- Live albums: 1
- Singles: 22
- Music videos: 25
- Split releases: 1

The discography of the post-hardcore band ...And You Will Know Us by the Trail of Dead consists of 11 studio albums, one live album, 22 singles, five EPs and 25 music videos.

== Albums ==
=== Studio albums ===
List of studio albums, with selected chart positions and sales figures
Title	Album details	Peak chart positions										Sales
Title	Album details	US	AUT	BEL (FL)	GER	NED Alt	NOR	SCO	SWI	UK	UK Rock	Sales
...And You Will Know Us by the Trail of Dead	Released: January 20, 1998; Label: Trance Syndicate; Format: CD, LP	—	—	—	—	—	—	—	—	—	—	
Madonna	Released: October 19, 1999; Label: Merge Records; Format: CD, LP	—	—	—	—	—	—	—	—	—	—	
Source Tags & Codes	Released: February 26, 2002; Label: Interscope Records; Format: CD, LP	— (Note: Source Tags & Codes did not enter the US Billboard 200, but peaked at number 17 on the Heatseekers Albums Chart.)	—	—	64	—	—	49	—	73	8	US: 125,000
Worlds Apart	Released: January 25, 2005; Label: Interscope Records; Format: CD, CD + DVD, 2xLP	81	—	—	40	6	29	79	—	92	4	US: 56,000
So Divided	Released: November 13, 2006; Label: Interscope Records; Format: CD	188	—	—	72	27	—	—	—	190	—	US: 26,000
The Century of Self	Released: February 17, 2009; Label: Richter Scale/Justice Records; Format: CD, 2xLP	169	70	—	38	—	—	—	—	148	—	
Tao of the Dead	Released: February 11, 2011; Label: Richter Scale/Superball Music; Format: CD, LP	—	54	—	18	30	—	—	50	—	14	
Lost Songs	Released: October 22, 2012; Label: Richter Scale/Superball Music; Format: CD, LP	—	—	193	47	—	—	—	—	— (Note: Lost Songs did not enter the UK Albums Chart, but peaked at number 33 on the UK Record Store Chart.)	20	
IX	Released: October 10, 2014; Richter Scale/Dine Alone Records; Format: CD, LP	—	—	168	63	—	—	—	—	—	19	
X: The Godless Void and Other Stories	Released: January 17, 2020; Label: Richter Scale/Dine Alone Records; Format: CD, LP	—	67	—	19	—	—	61	83	— (Note: X: The Godless Void and Other Stories did not enter the UK Albums Chart, but peaked at number 73 on the UK Album Sales Chart.)	6	
XI: Bleed Here Now	Released: July 15, 2022; Label: Richter Scale/Inside Out; Format: CD, CD + Blu-ray, 2xLP	—	—	—	23	—	—	—	52	— (Note: XI: Bleed Here Now did not enter the UK Albums Chart, but peaked at number 76 on the UK Album Sales Chart.)	—	
"—" denotes a recording that did not chart or was not released in that territory.

=== Live albums ===
Title	Details
Live at Rockpalast 2009	Released: April 28, 2014; Label: MIG Music; Format: CD, DVD, 2xLP

== Extended plays ==
List of studio albums, with selected chart positions
Title	Details	Peak chart positions	
Title	Details	US Heat.	AUS Hit.
Relative Ways	Released: November 6, 2001; Label: Interscope Records; Format: CD, LP	—	—
The Secret of Elena's Tomb	Released: April 1, 2003; Label: Interscope Records; Format: CD, LP	16	12
Worlds Apart – EP	Released: October 12, 2004; Label: Interscope Records; Format: CD, 7"	—	—
Festival Thyme	Released: October 21, 2008; Label: Richter Scale/Justice Records; Format: CD, LP	—	—
Tao of the Dead Part III	Released: December 16, 2013; Label: Richter Scale/Dine Alone; Format: CD, LP	—	—
"—" denotes a recording that did not chart or was not released in that territory.

Split EPs

List of studio albums, with selected chart positions
Title	Details
Adult Swim Presents: ...And You Will Know Us by the Trail of Dead on Tour with Dethklok	Released: October 29, 2007; Label: Williams Street; Format: CD (DualDisc)

== Singles ==
List of singles, with selected chart positions, showing year released and album name
Title	Year	Peak chart positions				Album
Title	Year	SCO	UK	UK Indie	UK Rock	Album
"Mistakes and Regrets"	2000	72	69	16	—	Madonna
"Another Morning Stoner"	2002	62	54	—	—	Source Tags & Codes
"Relative Ways"	2002	—	84	—	7	Source Tags & Codes
"Worlds Apart"	2004	—	—	—	—	Worlds Apart
"The Rest Will Follow"	2005	92	77	—	8	Worlds Apart
"Wasted State of Mind"	2006	—	—	—	—	So Divided
"Naked Sun"	2006	—	—	—	—	So Divided
"Isis Unveiled"	2009	—	—	—	—	The Century of Self
"Summer of All Dead Souls"	2010	—	—	—	—	Tao of the Dead
"Up to Infinity"	2012	—	—	—	—	Lost Songs
"Catatonic"	2012	—	—	—	—	Lost Songs
"The Ghost Within"	2014	—	—	—	—	IX
"The Lie Without a Liar"	2015	—	—	—	—	IX
"Don't Look Down"	2019	—	—	—	—	X: The Godless Void and Other Stories
"Into the Godless Void"	2019	—	—	—	—	X: The Godless Void and Other Stories
"Blade of Wind"	2020	—	—	—	—	X: The Godless Void and Other Stories
"All Who Wander"	2021	—	—	—	—	X: The Godless Void and Other Stories
"No Confidence"	2022	—	—	—	—	XI: Bleed Here Now
"Salt in Your Eyes"	2022	—	—	—	—	XI: Bleed Here Now
"Contra Mundum"	2022	—	—	—	—	XI: Bleed Here Now
"Penny Candle"	2022	—	—	—	—	XI: Bleed Here Now
"Millennium Actress" (feat. Amanda Palmer)	2022	—	—	—	—	XI: Bleed Here Now
"—" denotes a recording that did not chart or was not released in that territory.

== Other appearances ==
- "Let It Dive" from Worlds Apart was featured on EA Sports' MVP Baseball 2005

== Music videos ==
- "Mistakes & Regrets"
- "Relative Ways"
- "Another Morning Stoner"
- "All St. Day" (on the Worlds Apart' bonus DVD)
- "The Rest Will Follow"
- "Caterwaul"
- "Naked Sun" (Edit)
- "Isis Unveiled" (Radio Edit)
- "Summer of all Dead Souls"
- "Catatonic"
- "Lost Songs"
- "The Ghost Within"
- "The Lie Without a Liar"
- "Don't Look Down"
- "Into The Godless Void"
- "Something Like This"
- "All Who Wander"
- "Salt In Your Eyes"
- "Contra Mundum"
- "Penny Candle"
- "Millennium Actress"
- "Growing Divide"
- "Kill Everyone"
