= Adult Swim Presents: ...And You Will Know Us by the Trail of Dead on Tour with Dethklok =

2007 EP

EP by Dethklok and ...And You Will Know Us by the Trail of Dead
- Released: October 29, 2007
- Recorded: 2002–2007
- Genre: Melodic death metal; alternative rock
- Length: 16:04 (CD); 3:48 (DVD)
- Label: Williams Street
- Producer: Ulrich Wild, Brendon Small, Mike McCarthy

Dethklok chronology
The Dethalbum (2007)	Adult Swim Presents: ...And You Will Know Us by the Trail of Dead on Tour with Dethklok (2007)	Dethalbum II (2009)

...And You Will Know Us by the Trail of Dead chronology
So Divided (2006)	Adult Swim presents: ...And You Will Know Us by the Trail of Dead on Tour with Dethklok (2007)	Festival Thyme (2008)

Adult Swim Presents: ...And You Will Know Us by the Trail of Dead on Tour with Dethklok (also known as simply Trail of Dead/Dethklok) is a split EP released by Dethklok and ...And You Will Know Us by the Trail of Dead. It was released for free at concerts to coincide with their shared 2007–2008 tour. The EP features a CD that includes songs from both bands, and a DVD that features Metalocalypse promo videos.

== Release ==
The EP was given out for free at the band's 2007 university tour. The track listing for the Dethklok songs is incorrect, it states that the three songs are Hatredcopter, Fan Song, and Deththeme. The CD also states that the ...And You Will Know Us by the Trail of Dead song "Blood Rites" was released on their album Madonna, but it was actually released on Source Tags & Codes.

The college dates for the tour were as follows:

- Oct. 29 – University of New Mexico, Albuquerque, NM
- Oct. 31 – University of Nevada, Las Vegas, NV
- Nov. 01 – University of California, Los Angeles, CA
- Nov. 02 – University of California, Berkeley, CA
- Nov. 05 – Colorado State University, Fort Collins, CO
- Nov. 07 – University of Minnesota, Minneapolis, MN
- Nov. 08 – University of South Dakota, Vermillion, SD
- Nov. 11 – University of Colorado, Boulder, CO
- Nov. 13 – Southern Illinois University, Carbondale, IL
- Nov. 14 – University of Wisconsin, Madison, WI
- Nov. 15 – (CANCELLED) University of Oklahoma, Norman, OK
- Nov. 17 – University of Kansas, Lawrence, KS
- Nov. 18 – Northwestern University, Chicago, IL

== Track listing ==
=== CD ===
Music For Your Eardrums...And You Will Know Us by the Trail of Dead
No.	Title	Length
1.	"Stand in Silence" (from So Divided)	4:35
2.	"Blood Rites" (from Source Tags & Codes)	1:58

Dethklok
No.	Title	Length
3.	"Bloodrocuted" (from The Dethalbum)	2:18
4.	"Go Forth and Die" (from The Dethalbum)	4:22
5.	"Fansong" (from The Dethalbum)	2:53
Total length:		16:04

=== DVD ===
Video For Your Eyedrums
No.	Title	Length
1.	"Dethklok "Bloodrocuted" music video"	2:18
2.	"Dethalbum promo"	0:30
3.	"Metalocalypse DVD promo"	0:30
4.	"Adult Swim sneak peek"	0:30
Total length:		3:48

== Personnel ==
=== Dethklok ===
- Brendon Small – guitar, bass guitar, vocals
- Gene Hoglan – drums

=== ...And You Will Know Us by the Trail of Dead ===
- Conrad Keely – vocals
- Kevin Allen – guitar
- Jason Reece – drums
- Doni Schroader – percussion
- Daniel Wood – bass
