= The Black (American band) =

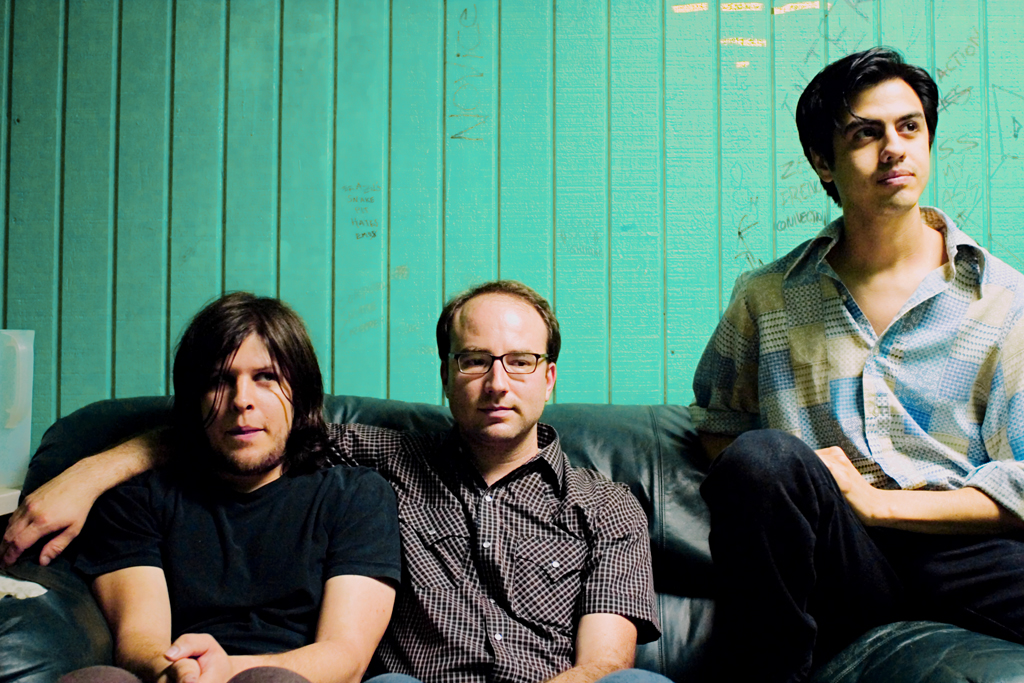
- (l-r): Yamal Said, Alan Schaefer, David Longoria

Background information
- Origin: Austin, Texas, United States
- Genres: Indie rock
- Years active: 2002 – present
- Label: K Woo
- Members: David Longoria (vocals, guitar); Alan Schaefer (lead guitar); Matt Simon (drums); Bryan Mammel(piano, keys); Amy Hawthorne(bass guitar)
- Past members: Clint Newsom; Nick Moulos; Andy Morales; Zach Hennard; Adam Amparan; Danica Newell; Conrad Keely, Jason Reece, Kevin Allen, Danny Wood, Doni Schroader (...Trail of Dead); Trivett Wingo (The Sword); Jason Chronis, Matt Simon, Jared Van Fleet (Voxtrot)
- Website: theblackmusic.com

The Black is a rock band from Austin, Texas that formed in 2002 when singer/songwriter David Longoria began collaborating with drummer Andy Morales. The two were later joined by guitarist Alan Schaefer (son of famous guitar maker Ed Schaefer) and Nick Moulos of the Austin band The Crackpipes.

== History ==
Their full-length album Tanglewood was recorded in 2004 and released in 2005 on their own record label K Woo.

The band's next release, titled Donna, was released in 2007.

== Discography ==
=== Studio albums ===
- Tanglewood (20 April 2005)
- Donna EP (30 July 2007)
- Little Hits/China (2009)
- Sun in the Day Moon at Night (12 October 2011)

=== Videos ===
- Little Hits
- Now I Am Here on YouTube.com

== Members ==
=== Current ===
- David Longoria – lyrics, vocals 2004–present
- Alan Schaefer – guitar 2004–present
- Matt Simon – drums present
- Bryan Mammel – Piano, keys present
- Amy Hawthorne -bass

=== Previous ===
Drummers

- Andy Morales – (2004)
- Yamal Said-(2005)(2007)

Bassists

- Clint Newsom – (2004)
- Nick Moulos – (2004–2005)
- Adam Amparan – (2005–2006)
- Zach Hennard – (2006–2007)
- Pink Nasty – (2007)

Pianists

- Danica Newell – (2004)
- Conrad Keely – (2005)
- Jared Van Fleet – (2006–2007)
