= Hilary Hahn =

American violinist (born 1979)

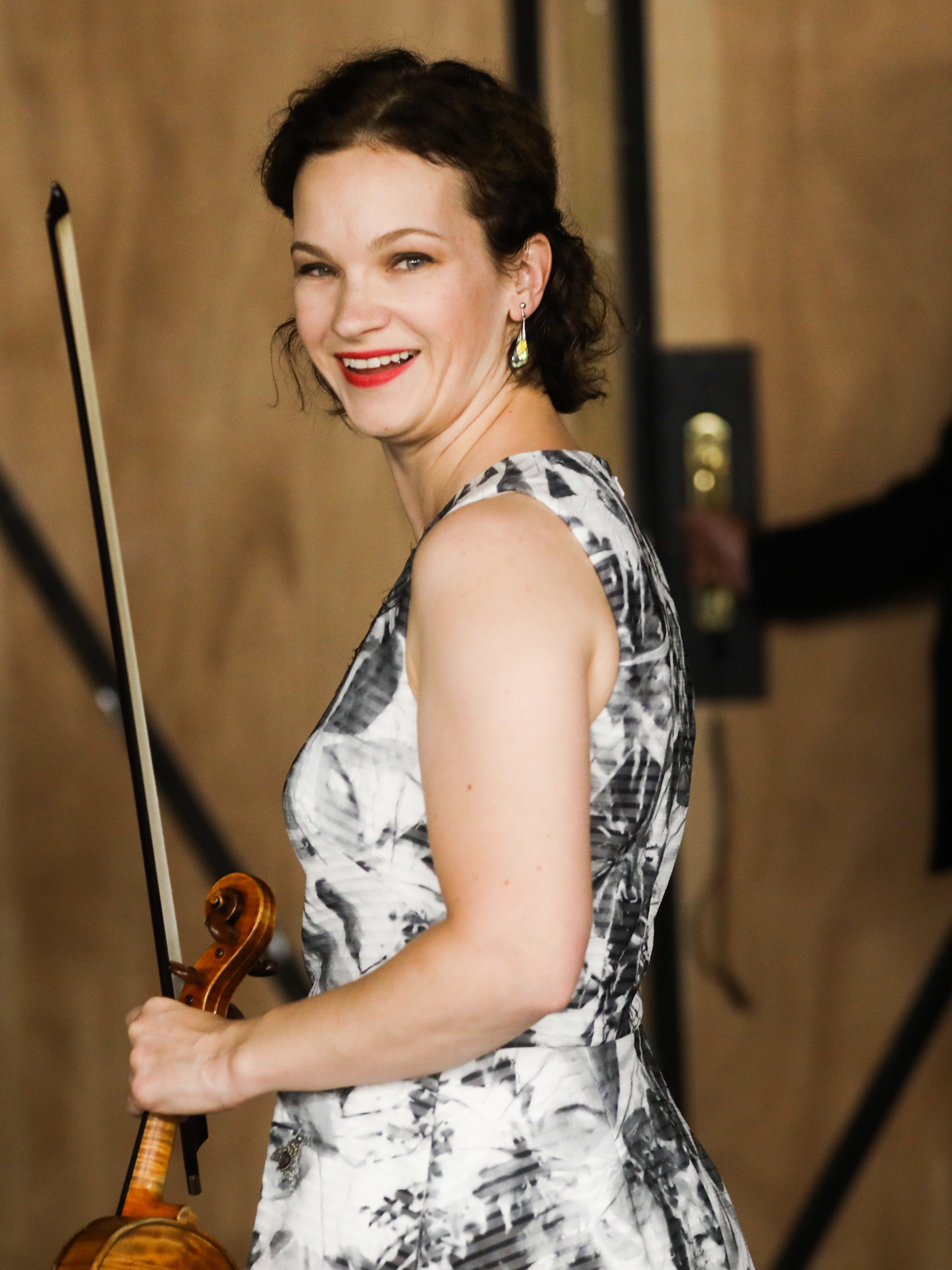
- Hahn in 2019

Background information
- Born: November 27, 1979 (age 46); Lexington, Virginia, U.S.
- Genre: Classical
- Occupation: Musician
- Instruments: Violin; 1864 J.-B. Vuillaume (Il Cannone Guarneri reproduction); 1865 J.-B. Vuillaume (Alard Stradivarius loose reproduction)
- Years active: 1991–present
- Labels: Deutsche Grammophon; Sony Classical; Decca Classics

Hilary Hahn (born November 27, 1979) is an American violinist. A three-time Grammy Award winner, she has performed throughout the world as a soloist with leading orchestras and conductors, and as a recitalist. She is an avid supporter of contemporary classical music, and several composers have written works for her, including concerti by Edgar Meyer and Jennifer Higdon, partitas by Antón García Abril, two serenades for violin and orchestra by Einojuhani Rautavaara, and a violin and piano sonata by Lera Auerbach.

== Early life and education ==
Hahn was born in Lexington, Virginia, on November 27, 1979, and grew up in the Baltimore, Maryland, area. Her father, Steve Hahn, was a journalist and librarian; her paternal great-grandmother was from Bad Dürkheim in Germany. Her mother, Anne, was an accountant.

A musically precocious child, Hahn began playing the violin one month before her fourth birthday in the Suzuki Program of Baltimore's Peabody Institute. She studied using the Suzuki method until age five before studying in Baltimore under Klara Berkovich from 1985 to 1990.

In 1990, at age ten, she was admitted to the Curtis Institute of Music in Philadelphia, where she studied for seven years with Jascha Brodsky, who had been a student of Eugène Ysaÿe. She learned the études of Kreutzer, Ševčík, Gaviniès and Rode, Paganini's Caprices, 28 violin concertos, and chamber works and assorted showpieces.

At 16 she completed the Curtis Institute's university requirements, but she remained for an additional three years to pursue elective courses until her graduation in May 1999 with a Bachelor of Music degree. During this time she studied violin with Jaime Laredo and studied chamber music with Felix Galimir and Gary Graffman.

She also spent four summers in the total-immersion language programs in German, French, and Japanese at Middlebury College.

== Musical career ==
On December 21, 1991, at age 12, Hahn made her major orchestral debut with the Baltimore Symphony Orchestra. Soon thereafter she debuted with the Philadelphia Orchestra, Cleveland Orchestra, Pittsburgh Symphony Orchestra and the New York Philharmonic. She made her international debut in 1994 performing the Bernstein Serenade in Hungary with Ivan Fischer and the Budapest Festival Orchestra. Her German debut came in 1995 with a performance of the Beethoven Violin Concerto with Lorin Maazel and the Bavarian Radio Symphony Orchestra. The concert was broadcast in Europe.

In 1996, she debuted at Carnegie Hall in New York City as a soloist with the Philadelphia Orchestra, playing Saint-Saens's third violin concerto. In a 1999 interview with Strings Magazine, she cited people influential to her development as a musician and a student, including David Zinman, the conductor of the Baltimore Symphony and Hahn's mentor since she was ten, and Lorin Maazel, with whose Bavarian Radio Symphony Orchestra she performed in Europe.

Hahn began recording in 1996. Her earlier television appearances include Mr. Rogers' Neighborhood in 2000 (episode 1755), where Mr. Rogers visits Joe Negri's music store and she plays for him. She has released 16 albums on the Deutsche Grammophon and Sony labels, three DVDs, an Oscar-nominated movie soundtrack, an award-winning recording for children, and various compilations. Her recordings often blend newer and traditional pieces. Her albums include pairings of Beethoven with Bernstein, Schoenberg with Sibelius, Brahms with Stravinsky, and Tchaikovsky with Jennifer Higdon.

Hahn has played with orchestras such as the London Symphony Orchestra, New York Philharmonic, Boston Symphony Orchestra, Royal Concertgebouw Orchestra, NHK Symphony Orchestra, Los Angeles Philharmonic and Singapore Symphony Orchestra. In 2007 she debuted with the Chicago Symphony Orchestra and played in Vatican City as part of the celebrations for Pope Benedict XVI with the Stuttgart Radio Symphony Orchestra and conductor Gustavo Dudamel. The concert was recorded and released by Deutsche Grammophon.

She has also performed as a chamber musician. Since 1992 she has performed nearly every year with the Skaneateles Chamber Music Festival in Skaneateles, New York. From 1995 to 2000 she performed and studied chamber music at the Marlboro Music Festival in Vermont, and in 1996 she was an artist and a member of the chamber music mentoring program of The Chamber Music Society of Lincoln Center. In 2004 she toured Saint Petersburg, Russia, with the Poulenc Trio.

Hahn has been interested in cross-genre collaboration and pushing musical boundaries. She began performing and touring in crossover duos with singer-songwriter Josh Ritter in 2007 and with singer-songwriter Tom Brosseau in 2005. She has recorded songs with the alternative rock band ...And You Will Know Us by the Trail of Dead. In 2012 she released an album with German pianist and composer Hauschka (Volker Bertelmann) titled Silfra. The songs on the disc were completely improvised. Silfra was produced by Valgeir Sigurðsson. According to her, "Other musicians cross genres all the time. For me it's not crossover—I just enter their world. It frees you up to think in a different way from what you've been trained to do."

In June 2014, Hahn was awarded the Glashütte Original MusikFestspiel-Preis of the Dresden Music Festival.

Since 2016, she has piloted free concerts for parents with infants, a knitting circle, a community dance workshop, a yoga class, and art students. She plans to continue these community-oriented concerts, encouraging people to combine live performances with their interests outside the concert hall and providing opportunities for parents to hear music with their infants, who might be barred from traditional concerts.

In 2020, Hahn and AI roboticist and tech entrepreneur Carol E. Reiley cofounded DeepMusic.ai to work with artists and AI companies to amplify human creativity.

In August 2022, Classic FM listed Hahn as one of the 25 greatest violinists of all time.

In January 2024 she was awarded the 2024 Avery Fisher Prize.

In January 2024 and February 2025, Hahn collaborated with ballet dancer Tiler Peck and other artists on hour-long late-night programs sponsored by the New York Philharmonic. Building on this partnership, Hahn was the soloist at the 2026 premiere of Peck's ballet set to Édouard Lalo's Symphonie espagnole at New York City Ballet.

Gramophone named Hahn's Deutsche Grammophon recording of Eugène Ysaÿe's violin sonatas its Record of the Year for 2024.

=== Commissioning ===
Hahn is a noted champion of new works. In 1999 she commissioned Edgar Meyer to write a concerto. She later recorded the piece with the St. Paul Chamber Orchestra. In 2010 a concerto written for Hahn by Jennifer Higdon and recorded with the Royal Liverpool Philharmonic was awarded the Pulitzer Prize in Music.

She commissioned 26 contemporary composers to write short encore pieces for In 27 Pieces: the Hilary Hahn Encores. Among the composers are David Del Tredici, Jennifer Higdon, Du Yun, Elliott Sharp, David Lang, Nico Muhly, James Newton Howard, Valentyn Silvestrov, and Max Richter. For the 27th encore she held an open contest that drew more than 400 entries and was won by Jeff Myers. The international premiere tours, from 2011 to 2013, met with wide critical and audience acclaim. In November 2013 these 27 short pieces were released on Deutsche Grammophon. The recording won the Grammy Award for Best Chamber Music/Small Ensemble Performance.

After playing Einojuhani Rautavaara's violin concerto, Hahn commissioned another concerto from Rautavaara, but due to his weak condition the project was thought to be forgotten. But after his death, it was revealed to conductor Mikko Franck, a friend of Rautavaara's, that Rautavaara had written two serenades for violin and orchestra. The serenades were premiered on Hahn's album Paris.

In 2016 and 2017, in recital tours across the U.S., Europe, and Japan, she premiered six new partitas for solo violin by Antón García Abril, her first commissioning project for solo violin, as well as her first commission of a set of works from a single composer. She forged a relationship with García Abril during In 27 Pieces: the Hilary Hahn Encores. Digital and physical editions of the complete sheet music for these 27 encores have been released by Boosey & Hawkes. In 2019 Hahn and Lera Auerbach premiered Auerbach's sonata for violin and piano Fractured Dreams.

=== Film music ===
Hahn began her film recording career as the soloist for James Newton Howard's score for M. Night Shyamalan's The Village in 2004. The film was nominated for an Academy Award for Best Original Score. Her recording of Samuel Barber's Violin Concerto was used extensively in The Deep Blue Sea, starring Rachel Weisz and Tom Hiddleston. The film uses the piece's second movement to accompany a nine-minute sequence. In 2013, she was the soloist on Andrew Hewitt's score for the film The Sea.

=== On playing Bach ===
In 1999 Hahn said that she played Bach more than any other composer and had played solo Bach pieces every day since she was eight.

Bach is, for me, the touchstone that keeps my playing honest. Keeping the intonation pure in double stops, bringing out the various voices where the phrasing requires it, crossing the strings so that there are not inadvertent accents, presenting the structure in such a way that it's clear to the listener without being pedantic – one can't fake things in Bach, and if one gets all of them to work, the music sings in the most wonderful way.

— Hilary Hahn, Saint Paul Sunday

In a segment on NPR titled "Musicians in Their Own Words", she spoke about the surreal experience of playing the Bach Chaconne (from the Partita for Violin No. 2) alone on the concert stage. In the same segment she discussed her experiences emulating a lark while playing The Lark Ascending by Ralph Vaughan Williams.

== Instrument ==
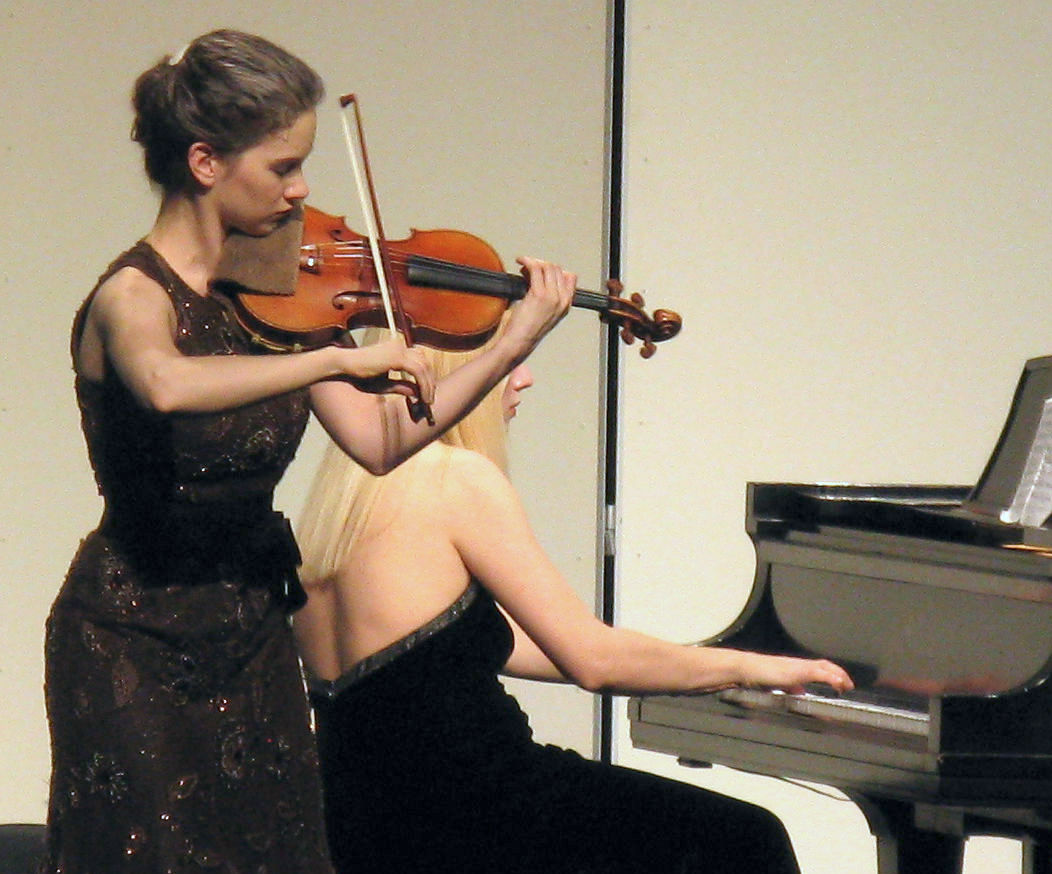
Hilary Hahn, violin; Valentina Lisitsa, piano (2009)

Her violin is an 1864 copy of Paganini's Cannone made by Jean-Baptiste Vuillaume. In an interview on Danish television, Hahn said she almost never leaves her instrument out of sight. She uses bows by American bow maker Isaac Salchow. For her strings, she uses Thomastik-Infeld Dominants for the A (aluminum wound), D and G (silver wound) and a Pirastro Gold Label Steel E.

She has also acquired a second Vuillaume, an 1865 model loosely based on the 1715 Alard Stradivarius, and has used both in recent years for recording and performing.

== Journal ==
Hahn's website includes a section titled "By Hilary." In a Strings Magazine interview, she said that the idea for her "Postcards from the Road" feature originated during an outreach visit to a third-grade class in upstate New York. The class was doing a geography project in which the students asked everyone they knew who was traveling to send postcards from the cities they were visiting to learn more about the world. She decided to participate after receiving a positive reaction to her suggestion that she take part. She enjoyed her first year's experience with the project so much that she decided to continue it on her new website. A few years later she expanded the postcards to a journal format. Journal entries usually include photographs from her tours and rehearsals.

== Personal life ==
Since 2016, Hahn and her husband have lived in Cambridge, Massachusetts, after having lived in New York City for several years. They have two daughters.

== Discography ==
- Hilary Hahn Plays Bach (1997) with Partita No. 3 in E major, BWV 1006, Partita No. 2 in D minor, BWV 1004 and Sonata No. 3 in C major, BWV 1005
- Beethoven Violin Concerto / Bernstein Serenade (1999). Baltimore Symphony Orchestra; David Zinman, conductor
  Grammy Nominee – Best Instrumental Soloist Performance with Orchestra
- Barber & Meyer Violin Concertos (2000). Saint Paul Chamber Orchestra; Hugh Wolff, conductor
- Brahms & Stravinsky Violin Concertos (2001). Academy of St Martin in the Fields; Neville Marriner, conductor
  Grammy Award for Best Instrumental Soloist(s) Performance (with orchestra)
- Mendelssohn & Shostakovich Concertos (2002). Oslo Philharmonic; Marek Janowski and Hugh Wolff, conductors
- Bach Concertos (2003). Hilary Hahn, violin; Margaret Batjer, violin; Allan Vogel, oboe. Los Angeles Chamber Orchestra; Jeffrey Kahane, conductor
- The Village Motion Picture Soundtrack (2004); Hilary Hahn, featured violinist; music composed by James Newton Howard
- Elgar: Violin Concerto; Vaughan Williams: The Lark Ascending (2004). London Symphony Orchestra; Colin Davis, conductor
- Mozart: Violin Sonatas K. 301, K. 304, K. 376 & K. 526 (2005). Natalie Zhu, piano accompanist
- "To Russia My Homeland" from the album Worlds Apart by ...And You Will Know Us by the Trail of Dead (2005)
- Paganini: Violin Concerto No. 1 / Spohr: Violin Concerto No. 8 – Gesangsszene (2006). Swedish Radio Symphony Orchestra; Eiji Oue, conductor
- "Witch's Web" from the album So Divided by ...And You Will Know Us by the Trail of Dead (2006)
- Der Kleine Hörsaal – Die Geige mit Hilary Hahn (2007); Hilary Hahn, narrator
- "Fork in the Road" and "Blue Part of the Windshield" from the album Grand Forks by Tom Brosseau (2007)
- Schoenberg: Violin Concerto; Sibelius: Violin Concerto (2008). Swedish Radio Symphony Orchestra; Esa-Pekka Salonen, conductor
  Debuted at No. 1 on Classical Billboard chart for three weeks (the first Schoenberg recording to debut at #1).
  Grammy Award for Best Instrumental Soloist(s) Performance (with orchestra)
  Grammy Nominee – Best Classical Album
  Ranked No. 6 by Newsweek on its list of the ten best albums of the decade.
- "Bach: Violin & Voice" (2010). Hilary Hahn, violin; Christine Schäfer, soprano; Matthias Goerne, baritone; Munich Chamber Orchestra
- Higdon & Tchaikovsky Violin Concertos (2010). Royal Liverpool Philharmonic; Vasily Petrenko, conductor
- Charles Ives: Four Sonatas (2011). Valentina Lisitsa, piano accompanist
  Preis der deutschen Schallplattenkritik
- Silfra (2012). Hauschka (aka Volker Bertelmann), prepared piano
- In 27 Pieces: The Hilary Hahn Encores (2013). Cory Smythe, piano accompanist
  Grammy Award for Best Chamber Music/Small Ensemble Performance
- Mozart 5, Vieuxtemps 4 – Violin Concertos (2015). Deutsche Kammerphilharmonie Bremen; Paavo Järvi, conductor
- Hilary Hahn Plays Bach: Sonatas 1 & 2, Partita 1 (2018) with Sonata for Violin Solo No. 1 in G minor, BWV 1001, Partita for Violin Solo No. 1 in B minor, BWV 1002, and Sonata for Violin Solo No. 2 in A minor, BWV 1003.
- 6 Partitas by Antón García Abril (2019) Partitas for solo violin written for Hilary Hahn
- Paris (2021) with Chausson's Poème, Prokofiev's Violin Concerto No. 1, & Rautavaara's two serenades for violin and orchestra. Orchestre Philharmonique de Radio France; Mikko Franck, conductor.
- Eclipse (2022) with Dvořák's Violin Concerto, Ginastera's Violin Concerto & Sarasate's Carmen Fantasy. Frankfurt Radio Symphony; Andrés Orozco-Estrada, conductor.
- Eugène Ysaÿe Six Sonatas for Violin Solo Op.27 (2023).
- Night After Night (Music from the Movies of M. Night Shyamalan) (2023), with James Newton Howard, composer; Jean-Yves Thibaudet, piano; and Maya Beiser, cello.
