= X: The Godless Void and Other Stories =

Studio album by ...And You Will Know Us by the Trail of Dead
- Released: 17 January 2020
- Recorded: 2018–2019
- Studio: Mosaic Sound Collective; Scary American; The Library Studios Nashville; The Henhouse Studio
- Genre: Post-hardcore; alternative rock
- Length: 50:10
- Label: Richter Scale; Dine Alone
- Producer: Charles Godfrey, Conrad Keely

...And You Will Know Us by the Trail of Dead chronology
IX (2014)	X: The Godless Void and Other Stories (2020)	XI: Bleed Here Now (2022)

X: The Godless Void and Other Stories is the tenth studio album by Austin, Texas alternative rock outfit ...And You Will Know Us by the Trail of Dead, released January 17, 2020 on Dine Alone Records.

== Background ==
Recording for the album started in 2018, after Conrad Keely returned to the US after five years in Cambodia, and took place at four different studios. Two studios based in Austin (Charles Godfrey's own Scary American and The Mosaic Sound Collective) and two studios in Nashville (The Library Studios and The Henhouse Studio) were used for recording. The album was announced on November 14, 2019, along with the track list, the release date, an accompanying tour, and the first single "Don't Look Down." It was widely noted that this would be their tenth studio album released in the year of the band's 25th Anniversary. X: The Godless Void and Other Stories also marks a return to the band's original personnel with Jason Reece and Conrad Keely acting as the only official members of the group, with all other recording musicians present only as supporting members.

== Critical reception ==
Professional ratings
Aggregate scores
Source	Rating
Metacritic	80/100
Review scores
Source	Rating
AllMusic	4/5 stars
The Austin Chronicle	4/5 stars
DIY	3.5/5 stars
Exclaim!	7/10
Kerrang!	4/5
Pitchfork	7.8/10
PopMatters	8/10
Rolling Stone	3/5 stars

Reviews for X: The Godless Void and Other Stories were largely positive upon release, with a Metacritic average of 80/100, indicating generally favorable reviews.

== Track listing ==
X: The Godless Void and Other Stories track listing
No.	Title	Length
1.	"The Opening Crescendo"	2:53
2.	"All Who Wander"	4:53
3.	"Something Like This"	4:35
4.	"Into the Godless Void"	3:57
5.	"Don't Look Down"	4:41
6.	"Gone"	4:04
7.	"Children of the Sky"	4:37
8.	"Who Haunts the Haunter"	5:30
9.	"Eyes of the Overworld"	1:46
10.	"Gravity"	3:45
11.	"Blade of Wind"	5:41
12.	"Through the Sunlit Door"	3:48
Total length:		50:10

== Personnel ==
...And You Will Know Us by the Trail of Dead

- Jason Reece – songwriter, performer
- Conrad Keely – producer, recording, writer, performer, artwork, design

Additional musicians

- Aaron Blount – guitar
- Will Courtney – backing vocals (track 10)
- Autry Fulbright II – bass guitar
- Jamie Miller – drums, percussion (tracks 1, 2, 4, 8 and 12)
- Krystal Morris – vocal percussion (sampling) (track 1)
- Cully Symington – drums (tracks 1, 2, 3 and 5)

Production

- Charles Godfrey – producer, recording
- Rich Mendez – pre-production assistant
- Peter Van 't Riet – mastering

== Charts ==
Sales chart performance for X: The Godless Void and Other Stories
Chart (2020)	Peak position
Austrian Albums (Ö3 Austria)	67
German Albums (Offizielle Top 100)	19
Swiss Albums (Schweizer Hitparade)	83

== See also ==
- List of 2020 albums
