= ...And You Will Know Us by the Trail of Dead (album) =

1998 album

Studio album by ...And You Will Know Us by the Trail of Dead
- Released: 1998
- Recorded: July 1997
- Genre: Post-hardcore
- Length: 39:47
- Label: Trance Syndicate
- Producer: Chris "Frenchie" Smith

...And You Will Know Us by the Trail of Dead chronology
...And You Will Know Us by the Trail of Dead (1998)	Madonna (1999)

Professional ratings
Review scores
Source	Rating
AllMusic	4/5 stars
The Encyclopedia of Popular Music	3/5 stars
NME	8/10

...And You Will Know Us by the Trail of Dead is the first full-length release from rock band ...And You Will Know Us by the Trail of Dead. It was released in 1998 by Trance Syndicate.

== Track listing ==
No.	Title	Length
1.	"Richter Scale Madness"	3:44
2.	"Novena Without Faith"	8:24
3.	"Fake Fake Eyes"	2:42
4.	"Half of What"	3:06
5.	"A Gargoyle Waiting"	6:50
6.	"Prince with a Thousand Enemies"	3:58
7.	"Ounce of Prevention"	3:17
8.	"When We Begin to Steal..."	7:46

== Personnel ==
- Richard McIntosh – Photography
- Dave McNair – Mixing
- Chris "Frenchie" Smith – Producer
- Mike McCarthy – Engineer
- Kevin Allen – Producer
- Jason Reece – Producer
- Conrad Keely – Producer, Cover Design
- Chris Cline – Producer, Editing, Mastering, Mixing
