= So Divided =

Studio album by ...And You Will Know Us by the Trail of Dead
- Released: November 13, 2006
- Studio: The Mob House and Big Orange Studios, Austin, TX
- Genre: Alternative rock; progressive rock; baroque pop
- Length: 46:14
- Label: Interscope
- Producer: Mike McCarthy

...And You Will Know Us by the Trail of Dead chronology
| Worlds Apart (2005) | So Divided (2006) | ...And You Will Know Us by the Trail of Dead/Dethklok (2007) |

Singles from So Divided
- 1. "Wasted State of Mind" Released: 2006; 2. "Naked Sun" Released: 2006

So Divided is the fifth studio album by ...And You Will Know Us by the Trail of Dead released in the UK on November 13, 2006, and in the US on November 14. It saw the band continuing to expand its sound, along the lines of its predecessor Worlds Apart.

The lead single from the album was the track "Wasted State of Mind", though no music video was made for it. A video was, however, created for the song "Naked Sun," but with no input whatsoever from the band.

== Critical reception ==
Professional ratings
Aggregate scores
| Source | Rating |
|---|---|
| Metacritic | 68/100 |
Review scores
| Source | Rating |
| AbsolutePunk | 74% |
| AllMusic | 4/5 stars |
| Entertainment Weekly | B |
| The Guardian | 4/5 stars |
| Pitchfork Media | 5.5/10 |
| PopMatters | 5/10 stars |
| Rolling Stone | 3/5 stars |
| Spin | 7/10 |
| Stylus Magazine | D |
| Tiny Mix Tapes | 3/5 marks |
| Alternative Press | 4/5 |

The album received a score of 68 out of 100 from Metacritic based on "generally favorable reviews". musicOMH gave the album all five stars and stated, "Trail of Dead appear to have dropped the noise, and bought out the tunes." NME gave it a score of eight out of ten and said that TOD "do propulsive pop-rock better than anyone." Alternative Press gave it four stars out of five and said, "It's clear that the Trail Of Dead we once knew no longer exists." Hartford Courant gave it a favorable review and said it was "Less conceptual and experimental than its predecessor" and "a moody album, loaded with dark imagery and moments of torturous self-doubt." The Phoenix gave it three stars out of four and said it " depends less on the band’s gear-smashing antics than on their sense of tunecraft, which isn’t as highly developed." The A.V. Club gave it a B and said that the album "rushes in the opposite direction, moving lyrically toward more recognizable rock themes and musically toward the center."

The Austin Chronicle gave the album three-and-a-half stars out of five and said it "attempts to unify the Austin outfit's operatic songcraft with the urgency of their "Days of Being Wild" to unlock 2003's The Secret of Elena's Tomb EP and overcome the trappings of the previous year's brilliant Source Tags and Codes, from which those days sprung." Yahoo! Music UK gave it seven stars out of ten and said it "sees ...Trail Of Dead leaving their footprints in some intriguingly unlikely places. Whether the faithful choose to follow them or not, they deserve respect for that alone." Blender gave the album three-and-a-half stars out of five and called it "satisfyingly sloppy". URB gave it three-and-a-half stars out of five and stated that "The path to orchestral bombast continues". Paste likewise gave it three-and-a-half stars out of five and called it "A grandiose pop album that applies certain ToD formulas to the ambitious agenda taken by bands like Mercury Rev and Doves." Billboard gave it a positive review and said it "offers a more diverse song mix than one might expect."

Other reviews are average, mixed, or negative: Q gave the album three stars out of five and called it "the sound of a maverick raging against the dying of the light." Uncut likewise gave it three stars and said the album "curbs some of the excesses that made 2005's Worlds Apart so unfocused." Playlouder likewise gave it three stars out of five and said, "It's hard to truly love a band that are so chameleonic that they sacrifice signature definition for adventurousness." Likewise, Now gave it three stars and said, "While they may never reach the heights of their Source Tags & Codes, the band can still push boundaries." The Village Voice gave it an average review and said of the album, "As with most things Trail of Dead, it's bloated where it thinks it's profound." Prefix Magazine gave it a score of 5.5 out of ten and said, "Despite the impressive stylistic voices and rich production, there's ultimately something hollow around the project." Drowned in Sound gave it a score of five out of ten and stated: "While the instrumental augmentation in most of the songs is impressive, the setlist feels less immediate than the band's past work." Mojo, however, gave the album two stars out of five and said it was " less pompous, but the dynamic likes of Naked Sun and Stand In Silence barely atone for hamfisted stabs at chamber pop, country and The Cure." Stylus Magazine gave it a D and said of the album, "Its artistic detours are even more jarring than those of Worlds Apart. The good news is that its quality is far less erratic. The bad news is the reason why: it's almost uniformly awful."

== Track listing ==
All tracks are written by ...And You Will Know Us by the Trail of Dead except where noted.

| No. | Title | Writer(s) | Length |
|---|---|---|---|
| 1. | "Intro: A Song of Fire and Wine" | | 1:42 |
| 2. | "Stand in Silence" | | 4:35 |
| 3. | "Wasted State of Mind" | | 5:27 |
| 4. | "Naked Sun" | | 6:04 |
| 5. | "Gold Heart Mountain Top Queen Directory" (†) | Robert Pollard | 2:14 |
| 6. | "So Divided" | | 6:29 |
| 7. | "Life" | | 5:59 |
| 8. | "Eight Days of Hell" | | 2:09 |
| 9. | "Witch's Web" | | 4:11 |
| 10. | "Segue: In the Realms of the Unreal" (‡) | | 2:19 |
| 11. | "Sunken Dreams" | | 5:05 |
| Total length: | | | 46:14 |

Japanese and European editions
| No. | Title | Length |
|---|---|---|
| 12. | "Witch's Web" (Original Version) | 4:47 |
| Total length: | | 51:01 |

iTunes edition
| No. | Title | Length |
|---|---|---|
| 12. | "Let It Dive" (Demo Version) | 3:49 |
| Total length: | | 50:03 |

Notes

- † The album includes a cover of Guided by Voices' "The Goldheart Mountaintop Queen Directory", which originally appeared on the GBV album Bee Thousand.
- ‡ The back cover incorrectly names track 10 as "Segue: Sunken Dreams".

== Personnel ==
...And You Will Know Us by the Trail of Dead

- Kevin Allen
- Conrad Keely
- Jason Reece
- Doni Schroader
- Daniel Wood

Additional musicians

- Amanda Palmer: piano on "Life", "Eight Day Hell" and "Witch's Web". Vocals on "Witch's Web".
- Lily Courtney: backing vocals on all songs, lead vocals on "Eight Day Hell" and end vocals on "Life".
- Will Courtney: backing vocals on all songs, lead vocals on "Eight Day Hell"
- James Olsen: backing vocals on "Stand in Silence", "Naked Sun" and "Eight Day Hell". Lead vocal on "Sunken Dreams"
- Beaux Randall: backing vocals on "Naked Sun"
- Daniel Wilcox: slide guitar on "Witch's Web".
- Pat Mastelotto: percussion on "Wasted State of Mind" and "Life".
- Hilary Hahn, violin on "Witch's Web".
- Matt Bang: sax solo on "Naked Sun" (along with Conrad Keely)

== Charts ==
| Chart (2006) | Peak position |
|---|---|
| US Billboard 200 | 188 |
| German Albums (Offizielle Top 100) | 72 |
