= Original Machines =

Studio album by Conrad Keely
- Released: January 22, 2016
- Genre: Art rock, Indie rock, Alternative rock
- Length: 55:50
- Label: Superball Music

Original Machines is the debut solo album by Conrad Keely, primary singer and songwriter of Austin, Texas-based rock band ...And You Will Know Us by the Trail of Dead. Original Machines was released worldwide on January 22, 2016, on Superball Music. The third track from the album, "In Words of a Not So Famous Man," was released streaming on the internet by Superball on November 12, 2015.

== Background ==
Original Machines is the first solo album by Keely after twenty-two years and nine studio albums with ...And You Will Know Us by the Trail of Dead, the last Trail of Dead album prior to Original Machines is 2014's IX. The songs for Original Machines were primarily written while traveling in Cambodia after Keely moved to Phnom Penh in 2012, but a few were written while on tour with ...And You Will Know Us by the Trail of Dead, recording demos in the back of the tour bus. Keely relocated to Cambodia after being "fed up with American life." Although Keely does not speak Cambodian, he says the country is "a noisy place full of weird sounds – temples, monks chanting, loud speakers blaring, egg sellers and vendors. I need that chaos, and I think it helps that it’s in a language I don’t understand."

On the sound of his first work without the band, while speaking with Steve Bell of Australia's The Music, Keely said that he was "given more freedom to explore other textures and stuff that I might not usually" while having "the liberty to create something that's outside of [Trail of Dead's] rock paradigm."

== Critical reception ==
Original Machines received a "weighted average" score of 67 out of 100 on music review aggregation site Metacritic, indicating "generally favorable reviews" based on five publications.

A critic from Q magazine enjoyed the variety in the 24 tracks on the album, saying "What sounds antagonistic in premise actually proves to be a brilliant odyssey through the eclectic backwaters of Keely's imagination." A writer from Mojo agreed, calling the album a "pleasingly dizzying, yet curiously coherent." Stephen Ackroyd of Upset magazine supported this as well, saying "each [song] is a polished gem – never left long enough to outstay its welcome." JR Morgan from Under the Radar disagreed, saying that at 24 tracks the album "is an overwhelming and inconsistent listen; less a professionally-minded album, per se, than a sheer outpouring of the entire Keely vault," stating critically that "there are also several slick and seemingly full-fledged pieces that could've been packaged together, cut free of the slackerly baggage, and moulded into a more pristine collection that might not resemble a hastily-compiled posthumous release." A critic from Kerrang! supported this criticism, saying that the listener "can hear where [Keely's] heading with ideas, but, for the most part, these are more sketches than fully-formed songs."

== Track listing ==
No.	Title	Length
1.	"Original Machines"	1:17
2.	"Warm Insurrection"	2:08
3.	"In Words of a Not So Famous Man"	2:16
4.	"Inside the Cave"	2:56
5.	"Drive to Kampot"	2:41
6.	"Engines of the Dark"	3:12
7.	"Your Tide is Going Out"	2:23
8.	"Row Away"	3:22
9.	"Lost the Flow"	1:37
10.	"Nothing That I Meant (Interstellar)"	3:09
11.	"The Jungles"	1:23
12.	"All That's Left is Land"	3:48
13.	"Hills of K-Town"	2:21
14.	"Drive Back to Phnom Penh"	1:47
15.	"Forbidden Stones"	1:48
16.	"Out on the Road"	2:15
17.	"Rays of the Absolute"	2:21
18.	"Trust the Knowledge"	2:27
19.	"Looking for Anchors"	2:06
20.	"All Molten"	2:24
21.	"Waimanalo Drive"	1:13
22.	"Spotlight on the Victor"	3:30
23.	"Marcel Was Here"	0:33
24.	"Before the Swim"	2:51
Total length:		55:50
