= A Roman Scandal =

A Roman Scandal may refer to:

- A Roman Scandal (film), a 1919 American short silent comedy film
- A Roman Scandal (band), a synthpop band from Austin, Texas

== See also ==
- Roman Scandals, a 1933 American musical film
