= The Whale EP =

EP by Wild Sweet Orange
- Released: (United States) November 6, 2007
- Recorded: 2007
- Genre: Emo, indie rock
- Length: 20:20
- Label: Nervous Blood/TAO, Earfood
- Producer: Wild Sweet Orange

Wild Sweet Orange chronology
The Whale EP (2007)	We Have Cause to Be Uneasy (2008)

The Whale EP is a self-released EP by Wild Sweet Orange. It contains 5 songs and has a running time of 20 minutes and 20 seconds.

== EP track listing ==
1. "Wrestle With God" - 4:05
2. "Tilt (Acoustic)" - 5:16
3. "Be Careful (What You Want)" - 3:31
4. "Land of No Return" - 4:17
5. "I'm Coming Home" - 3:13
