= Lost Songs (...And You Will Know Us by the Trail of Dead album) =

Studio album by ...And You Will Know Us by the Trail of Dead
- Released: October 22, 2012
- Recorded: Horus Sound Studios
- Genre: Art rock, Alternative rock, Noise rock
- Length: 43:02
- Label: Richter Scale; Superball Music

...And You Will Know Us by the Trail of Dead chronology
Tao of the Dead (2011)	Lost Songs (2012)	IX (2014)

Lost Songs is the eighth studio album by Austin, Texas art rock outfit ...And You Will Know Us by the Trail of Dead, released October 22, 2012 on Superball Music.

== Recording ==
Lost Songs was recorded at Horus Sound Studios in Hanover, Germany. The album's lyrics are themed around war, tyranny and apathy. Frontman Conrad Keely said:

"The music was inspired by the apathy to real world events that has plagued the independent music scene now for over a decade. "Up to Infinity" is about the Syrian civil war. We believe that tyranny and despotism suffered by any people, anywhere, is intolerable and should not be treated as an internal matter, but completely justifies intervention by the international community."

== Release ==
The album was released three editions: a normal CD featuring the album's twelve tracks, a vinyl edition with four bonus tracks, and a 2 CD deluxe edition with the 12 album tracks plus the four bonus tracks on one disc as well as alternate, segued versions of the tracks on the second CD.

The song "Up To Infinity" was released on August 22, 2012 to promote the album. The band dedicated the track to Russian feminist act Pussy Riot. The first official single "Catatonic" was released through music streaming program Spotify on September 25. It was then released for download through iTunes on October 2. On the 15th of October, the standard edition of the album was put up for streaming on Spin.com.

== Critical reception ==
Professional ratings
Aggregate scores
Source	Rating
Metacritic	79/100
Review scores
Source	Rating
The A.V. Club	A−
Allmusic	4/5 stars
Consequence of Sound	4/5 stars
NME	7/10
Pitchfork Media	8.0/10
Popmatters	4/10
Sputnikmusic	4/5

Lost Songs has received mostly positive reviews so far. On Metacritic, the album has a score of 79 out of 100, indicating "generally favorable reviews".

Ryan Reed of The A.V. Club praised the album, writing "Even at its most polarizing, Trail Of Dead has never lacked thrilling ideas. But with Lost Songs, it's rekindled the raw, unflinching spirit that, a decade ago, placed the group among rock's elite." Allmusic's Heather Phares also gave the album a positive review, writing " While it may be a shade less inspired than Tao of the Dead, this is a solid, rugged album that underscores ...And You Will Know Us by the Trail of Dead's position as trailblazers and torchbearers when it comes to mixing passion and politics." Stuart Berman of Pitchfork Media gave the album a score of 8.0 out of 10, writing that while the album "is muddied somewhat by a weighty mid-album stretch," the album's "take on post-hardcore imagines an alternate history where indie rock's first-wave originators got to rule the modern-rock radio landscape of the 1990s, rather than just serve as an increasingly diluted influence upon it."

Brice Ezell of Popmatters, on the other hand, gave the album a mixed review, writing "When it comes down to it, these tracks really aren't that bad, but it's hard not to have the echoes of savvier songwriting in your head when listening to a group like Trail of Dead, whose history has shown them to be more sophisticated musicians than the ones present on Lost Songs." MusicOMH's Thomas May criticized the political-themed lyrics, writing "Trail Of Dead display the difficulty of dealing with such issues musically: this album is either overly clumsy in its attempts to make its points explicitly or, when operating more abstractly, appears immature in its undirected angst."

== Track listing ==
No.	Title	Length
1.	"Open Doors"	5:01
2.	"Pinhole Cameras"	4:48
3.	"Up to Infinity"	4:46
4.	"Opera Obscura"	3:44
5.	"Lost Songs"	2:04
6.	"Flower Card Games"	4:53
7.	"A Place to Rest"	3:14
8.	"Heart of Wires"	2:55
9.	"Catatonic"	3:35
10.	"Awestruck"	4:10
11.	"Bright Young Things"	3:40
12.	"Time and Again"	2:52
Total length:		43:02

Vinyl and Deluxe editions bonus tracks
No.	Title	Length
13.	"Skywhaling"	2:25
14.	"Mountain Battle Song"	4:54
15.	"Verschollene Songs"	2:07
16.	"Idols of Perversity"	2:34
Total length:		55:02

== Personnel ==
The following people contributed to Lost Songs:

=== ...And You Will Know Us by the Trail of Dead ===
- Conrad Keely – vocals, guitar, keyboards.
- Jason Reece – vocals, guitar, drums on tracks 4 and 5.
- Jamie Miller – guitar, drums on all tracks except 4 and 5.
- Autry Fulbright II – bass, guitar on track 9.

=== Additional personnel ===
- Mirko Hofmann – Engineer
- Dean Hsieh – Design, Illustrations
- Heba Kadry – Mastering
- David Kosta – Art Assistant
- Patrick McHugh – Band Photo
- Sean Rolie – Mixing
- Chris "Frenchie" Smith – Engineer, Mixing, Producer
