= Carson McHone =

American singer-songwriter and musician

Carson McHone is an American singer-songwriter, musician and artist from Austin, Texas. She has released four records: a self-titled EP in 2013, the album "Goodluck Man" in 2015, the album "Carousel" in 2018, and the album "Still Life" in 2022. In August 2017, Rolling Stone magazine named McHone as 1 of "10 New Country Artists You Need to Know". On October 26, 2018, McHone released her second full-length album Carousel on Nine Mile Records. Rolling Stone Magazine selected Carousel as one of the "40 Best Country and Americana Albums of 2018".

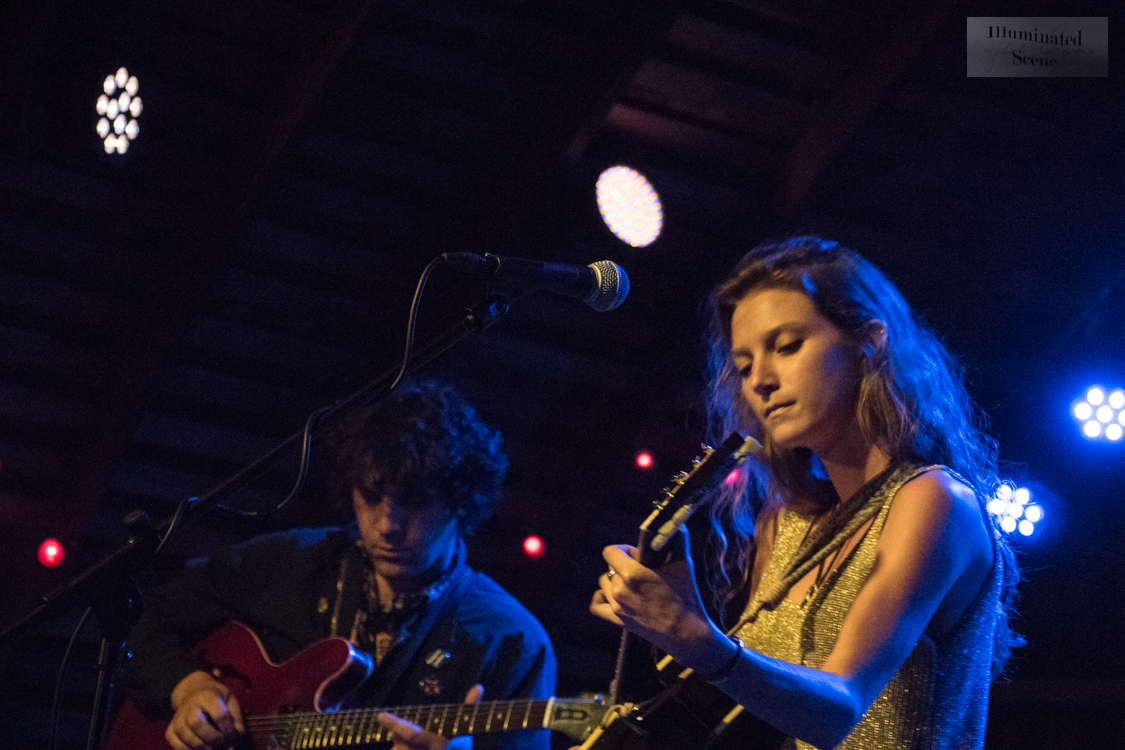

== History ==
Carson McHone is a singer-songwriter from Austin. In describing her music, Nashville Scene Magazine says "she's a young country singer who expresses herself through the form while avoiding the formalism that etiolates the work of many country purists."

She released her 1st recording – the self-titled EP "Carson McHone" in 2013. She played the South By Southwest Music Festival in Austin, Texas, for the first time that year. Shortly after that, she received an invitation to join the inaugural class of Project ATX6, which helped bring six Austin musicians to the NXNE (North By Northeast) Festival in Toronto, Ontario, Canada and the Reeperbahn Festival in Hamburg, Germany.

In 2015, McHone released her first full-length album – "Goodluck Man". Austin360 Magazine called it an "auspicious coming-out for one of the city's most promising young singer-songwriters."

McHone performed at the Americana Music Festival in Nashville, Tennessee, in September 2016. She returned the following year, performing in September, 2017.

In October 2017, McHone performed at the Austin City Limits Music Festival in Austin, Texas. Before the Festival, Vinyl List Magazine named her as "1 of the top 10 Austin artists to look out for." Afterwards, Consequences of Sound Magazine named her as 1 of the "top 10 set lists" from that year's festival.

In September 2018, McHone performed at the Americana Music Festival in Nashville, Tennessee In their review of her performance, Nowitsnashville magazine said "She possesses an beguiling wistfulness in slower songs that place her in a unique arena of Americana, but can present the same tongue in cheek observations that make country music so fun."

In August 2018 through October 2018, McHone released four singles from her upcoming album – Carousel. On August 23, 2018, McHone released "Sad" as its first single. Rolling Stone selected it as 1 of the "10 Best Country and Americana Songs of the Week". In their review, they said "it's driven along by fiddle and electric guitar — gleefully speeding up and slowing down at its own pace. Filled with self-aware lyrics about McHone's history of heartbreak, this is the sound of an artist making peace with her own unrest." Wide Open Country Magazine says "Sad starts off with a meandering sway with callbacks to "Tennessee Whiskey" before breaking off into a rolling mid-tempo gust. Though it's filled with rakes of fiddle and warbling pedal steel, it remains uncluttered as it punches along."American Songwriter Magazine described it as "a mid-tempo honky-tonk number built on pedal steel, fiddle, and a self-aware take on the hard luck heartbreak that often finds its way into such songs." On September 25, 2018 Wide Open Country magazine named the upcoming Carousel as one of the "Country and Americana albums you need to hear this fall". On September 19, 2018, McHone released a cover of the Uncle Walt's Band song "Don't You Think I Feel It Too", which was written by David Ball. The video for it premiered in Wide Open Country magazine where they described it as "an airy and light ballad with a fine and delicate touch to it. McHone taps into that unfiltered and pure beauty with ease." The video has been uploaded to YouTube. On October 11, 2018, McHone released "Good Time Daddy Blues" as a single. The song premiered in The Boot Magazine, where they said "Paired with a hard-driving melody and Lone Star State-influenced country sensibility, McHone's smoky vocals shine on "Good Time Daddy Blues". A live acoustic video of the song premiered in "Wide Open Country" Magazine on November 7, 2018. In describing it, they said, "Not all "done-me-wrong" country songs are slow, sad ballads as McHone proves with "Good Time Daddy Blues", a country-shuffle that chronicles the end of a relationship with confidence (and a healthy side of anger)." On October 28, 2018 McHone released another single - "Drugs". It premiered in Ladygunn Magazine where they said "It sounds like the warmth of a vintage record playing through mahogany speakers"

On October 26, 2018, McHone released her second full-length album – Carousel on Nine Mile Records. The album was recorded in Nashville and produced by Mike McCarthy, best known for his work with Spoon and Patty Griffin. In October 2018 McHone had several shows in Los Angeles, California. In November 2018, McHone toured throughout the Midwest and East Coast of the United States in support of Carousel. On November 29, 2018, the video for "Sad" was released in Line of Best Fit magazine. Where they said, ""Sad" epitomizes McHone's off-centre, oddball take on traditional country. It's alt-country at its most gloriously heartbreaking, honky-tonking, two-stepping best." The video has also been uploaded to YouTube.

In December 2018, Rolling Stone magazine selected Carousel as one of the "40 Best Country and Americana Albums of 2018". Saying "There's a delightful sense of traditionalism within the melodies of Carousel, but she never feels bound to it either. Like on the bare-bones, Gillian Welch-evoking "Spider Song", which closes the record, McHone knows it's the words that matter just as much as the packaging."

Loose Records in the UK signed McHone after her performance at the Americana Music Festival in Nashville, Tennessee, in September 2018. Carousel was released in the UK on January 25th, 2019. On January 29th, 2019 McHone performed at the AmericanaFest UK in London. In their review of her show, Lonesome Highway magazine said "Playing solo and to a large crowd, the diminutive McHone silenced the crowd at Oslo to pin drop levels one song into her set and proceeded to complete one of the festival performance highlights with standout tracks from her new album "Carousel" In their review of Carousel on May 5, 2019 Music Closeup said "With Carousel, McHone shows a reverence for traditional country sounds, but it's weaved with modern influences and production standards, and shrewd and worldly takes."

McHone toured throughout the UK in February 2019. In April and early May 2019, McHone toured throughout Scandinavia. McHone spent 2019 touring throughout Europe and the UK. She closed out her European tour on May 3, 2019, at the Red Rooster Festival in Euston, Suffolk, England.

On February 25, 2022, McHone released "Still Life" on Merge Records.

In June 2025, McHone announced a new album, Pentimento; it released on September 12, 2025.

== Discography ==
=== Albums ===
- Goodluck Man (2015)
- Carousel (2018)
- Still Life (2022)
- Pentimento (2025)

=== Extended plays ===
- Carson McHone (2013)

=== Singles ===
- "Sad" (August 23, 2018)
- "Don't You Think I Feel It Too" (September 19, 2018)
- "Good Time Daddy Blues" (October 11, 2018)
- "Drugs" (October 28, 2018)
