= Worlds Apart (...And You Will Know Us by the Trail of Dead album) =

Studio album by ...And You Will Know Us by the Trail of Dead
- Released: January 25, 2005
- Recorded: 2004 at The Mob House and Jack Rock Studio, Austin, TX; Brooklyn Recording, Brooklyn, NY
- Genres: Alternative rock; art rock; indie rock; progressive rock
- Length: 44:57
- Label: Interscope 0075021036932
- Producers: Mike McCarthy, ...And You Will Know Us by the Trail of Dead

...And You Will Know Us by the Trail of Dead chronology
The Secret of Elena's Tomb (2003)	Worlds Apart (2005)	So Divided (2006)

Singles from Worlds Apart
- 1. "Worlds Apart" Released: 2004; 2. "The Rest Will Follow" Released: 2005

Worlds Apart is the fourth studio album by ...And You Will Know Us by the Trail of Dead. It was released on January 25, 2005, by Interscope Records and reached #92 on the UK Albums Chart.

The album's first single, "The Rest Will Follow", was played on college radio and on some alternative stations throughout America. "Caterwaul" also received some airplay. Worlds Apart sold 13,000 copies in its first week of release in America, and went on to sell 56,000 albums in total, approximately half of what Source Tags & Codes sold in America.

== Production ==
The album release was postponed from the winter of 2004 to January 2005 by Interscope to protect it from late-year releases by Eminem (also released on Interscope) and Destiny's Child., in effect giving a better selling market. Vocalist Conrad Keely commented:

"I have constant anxiety that the record won't sell. We hope we appeal to not just people of this generation, but people of future generations. We're trying to do something that's timeless and timely. Something that's culturally significant. To have it overlooked would be, for me, a nightmare."

=== Design ===
In an interview with PopMatters, Keely described the development of the Worlds Apart cover art, stating that while he typically incorporates his free time drawings and paintings into the band's albums, this cover collage was more specifically designed. However, Interscope insisted that he cite and clear all sources of his art, much of which was found in museums around the world. Given the improbability of the task, illustrator Cyril Van der Haegen was hired to paint Keely's design and tweak various elements. Keely also summarized the theme of the collage:

"I wanted an allegory depicting the history of human conflict. I wanted everybody to be fighting, like in Marvel Comics' Secret Wars, where all the superheroes are fighting each other. I actually wanted to sneak in one of the New Mutants."

== Reception ==
Professional ratings
Aggregate scores
Source	Rating
Metacritic	67/100
Review scores
Source	Rating
AllMusic	3.5/5 stars
Entertainment Weekly	A−
Los Angeles Times	3.5/4 stars
Mojo	3/5 stars
NME	3/10
Pitchfork	4.0/10
Q	4/5 stars
Rolling Stone	3.5/5 stars
Spin	B
USA Today	3.5/4 stars

The album so far has a score of 67 out of 100 from Metacritic based on "generally favorable reviews". Filter gave the album a score of 92% and called it "the best album Trail of Dead has ever made." Neumu.net gave it nine stars out of ten and called it "a stunning showcase for AYWKUBTTOD's mature sound, full of unexpected subtleties, musical wild-cards and detours." E! Online gave it an A− and called it "killer stuff for any frame of mind." Billboard gave it a very favorable review and stated that "Trail of Dead has made the album of its career." Yahoo! Music UK gave it eight stars out of ten and called it "A frequently astonishing album that combines bruising rock and limp-wristed flourish in almost equal measure." Playlouder gave it four stars out of five and called it "a delicately violent piece of art." The A.V. Club gave it a favorable review and stated that "With Worlds Apart, the band takes a confident, blind leap toward a potentially confounding future, and lands solidly and triumphantly." Spin gave it a B and stated that "Between these boy-noise roils you can see how much the band want to be their generation's Yes." Under the Radar gave it seven stars out of ten and stated that "The band's musical scope has significantly expanded... and for the better." Drowned in Sound gave it seven out of ten and said that the band might have " missed the bullseye. But that's no reason to yell "sell out!", or to deride them as poseurs."

Other reviews are either average, mixed, or negative: Mojo gave the album three stars out of five and stated that "for all that bombast... there's a disappointing, un-Texan restraint." Uncut also gave it three stars and said it was "no less viscerally thrilling [than its predecessor] but pursues a number of ear-bogglingly unlikely paths." Blender likewise gave it three stars and called it "Unexpectedly clean-cut... the time-signature shifts and feedback swirls that earned [the band] minor adulation are sidelined in favor of pushy, arena-sized choruses." Likewise, Alternative Press gave it three stars and called it "The least pretentious--and most accessible--thing AYWKUBTTOD have ever released. That's probably because it sounds a lot like your record collection." Tiny Mix Tapes also gave it three stars out of five and said, "All these flowery production choices can at times be quite seductive, despite the glaring mishandling of the vocals astride them." The Village Voice gave it a mixed review and stated that "the band relies almost entirely on Keely, who dabbles in major-chorded piano balladry, a Southern rock opera complete with down-home piano and backup voices, whispery Beth Orton-style trip-hop, and high-pitch heart-on-sleeve emoting. It's all so precious; let's hope they still break shit live." Drawer B also gave it a very mixed review and said that "Trail of Dead sounds utterly reinvigorated yet dangerously reinvented." NME, however, gave it a score of three out of ten and said that the album "reads like a suicide note of a band that's tried to intellectualise its place in the canon of Western music and, in doing so, recognised its own irrelevance."

== Track listing ==
No.	Title	Length
1.	"Ode to Isis"	1:16
2.	"Will You Smile Again for Me"	6:50
3.	"Worlds Apart"	2:55
4.	"The Summer of '91"	3:12
5.	"The Rest Will Follow"	3:20
6.	"Caterwaul"	4:52
7.	"A Classic Arts Showcase"	5:47
8.	"Let It Dive"	4:45
9.	"To Russia, My Homeland" (†)	1:25
10.	"All White"	1:49
11.	"The Best"	4:47
12.	"The Lost City of Refuge"	3:50
Total length:		44:57

UK edition
No.	Title	Length
13.	"Aged Dolls" (Live from Chicago)	7:57
14.	"Richter Scale Madness" (Live from Chicago)	5:56
Total length:		58:50

German and Australian editions
No.	Title	Original Release	Length
13.	"Mach Schau"	The Secret of Elena's Tomb	3:48
14.	"All Saints Day"	The Secret of Elena's Tomb	3:53
Total length:			52:38

Japanese edition
No.	Title	Original Release	Length
13.	"All Saints Day"	The Secret of Elena's Tomb	3:53
14.	"Aged Dolls" (Live from Chicago)		7:57
15.	"Richter Scale Madness" (Live from Chicago)		5:56
Total length:			1:02:43

Special edition DVD
No.	Title	Writer(s)	Length
1.	"All Saint's Day" (Music Video‡)		4:08
2.	"Trail Of Dead Home Videos - A Documentary Film"		56:23
3.	"Death Of The Enlightened Amateur" (Essay)	Conrad Keely
4.	"Art Gallery"
5.	"Conrad's Sketchbook"

† features a violin solo by Hilary Hahn
‡ different from the live video from "The Secret of Elena's Tomb"

== Track information ==
=== "Ode to Isis" ===
The whole song follows a pattern of three bars of 5/4 followed by one bar of 6/4. It starts at a soft volume with only a piano, builds in volume and intensity, comes to include strings, and operatic-style singing, and ends with a woman's shrill scream. The melody stays essentially the same throughout the whole song and from bar to bar, the only deviation being the last quarter note of the 6/4 phrases. The song starts with the basic melody played staccato on the lower end of the piano's register. Tom-tom drums, a tambourine, singing and strings begin quietly at the start of the second melody cycle and steadily grow in intensity and volume throughout the whole song. The muted screams of women can be heard throughout the latter half of the song. At the very end of the song, a woman's voice starts in the left channel and ends in the right as she says the name of the band. Aside from this spoken phrase, the lyrics are:

Isis, Horus, Ra, Set
Isis, Horus, Ra, Set
Isis, Horus, Ra, Set
Isis, Horus, Anubis

=== "Will You Smile Again?" ===
"Will You Smile Again?" is about "the idea of the composer who is unable or unwilling to face the weight of their own genius, and allow their fears to stop them from accomplishing great work." The band wanted a picture of Brian Wilson, who was releasing Smile at the time, to accompany the song on the CD artwork. However, an art director at Interscope Records said they couldn't, and so a picture of Bach appears instead.

=== "Worlds Apart" ===
"Worlds Apart" is a protest song, bemoaning the current state of American popular culture and recent United States foreign policy, specifically the war on terrorism, also against MTV, soccer moms, and the state of parenting in today's society. It makes explicit reference to the September 11, 2001 attacks with the lyrics "How they laugh as we shovel the ashes / Of the twin towers. / Blood and death, we will pay back the debt / Of this candy store of ours." These lyrics are also briefly heard in a chanted reprise of this song, at the end of "The Best".

== Track appearances ==
"Let It Dive" was featured in the EA Sports video game MVP Baseball 2005. "Will You Smile Again?" was the emotional charge in a scene to end of 7th episode titled "Hurts" of The Shield in season 4. It also appears in the Codemasters video game Colin McRae: Dirt 2 and the 2005 movie Goal!. "Caterwaul" can be heard in the 2007 movie The Invisible (2007 film), where the main character is watching a girl dance to the music. "The Rest Will Follow" can be heard at the end of Letterkenny episode 3 of season 5.

== Charts ==
Chart performance
Chart (2005)	Peak position
Canadian Albums (Nielsen SoundScan)	105
Dutch Alternative Albums (Alternative Top 30)	6
German Albums (Offizielle Top 100)	40
Norwegian Albums (VG-lista)	29
Scottish Albums (Official Charts)	79
UK Albums (Official Charts)	92
UK Rock & Metal Albums (Official Charts)	4
US Billboard 200	81
