= Relative Ways =

EP by ...And You Will Know Us by the Trail of Dead
- Released: November 6, 2001
- Genre: Post-hardcore
- Length: 15:03
- Label: Interscope
- Producer: ...And You Will Know Us by the Trail of Dead

...And You Will Know Us by the Trail of Dead chronology
Madonna (1999)	Relative Ways (2001)	Source Tags & Codes (2002)

Professional ratings
Review scores
Source	Rating
AllMusic	3/5 stars
Drowned in Sound	(6/10)
Pitchfork Media	(8.6/10)

Relative Ways is an EP released by the band ...And You Will Know Us by the Trail of Dead for Interscope Records.

The 4-song EP was released in late 2001, setting the stage for the early 2002 release of their first major label full-length Source Tags & Codes, which contains all of the EP's tracks with the exception of "The Blade Runner".

== Track listing ==
No.	Title	Length
1.	"Relative Ways"	4:43
2.	"Homage"	3:31
3.	"Blood Rites"	1:58
4.	"The Blade Runner"	4:51
