= We Have Cause to Be Uneasy =

Studio album by Wild Sweet Orange
- Released: July 29, 2008
- Recorded: 2006–2008
- Genre: Indie rock
- Length: 50:26
- Label: Canvasback Music
- Producer: Mike McCarthy; Preston Lovinggood; Wild Sweet Orange

Wild Sweet Orange chronology
The Whale EP (2007)	We Have Cause to Be Uneasy (2008)

Singles from We Have Cause to Be Uneasy
- 1. "Ten Dead Dogs" Released: 2008; 2. "Either/Or" Released: 2008

Professional ratings
Review scores
Source	Rating
AbsolutePunk	90% link
PopMatters	6/10 link
UGO	A− link

We Have Cause to Be Uneasy is the only full-length album by American indie rock band Wild Sweet Orange and was released on July 29, 2008, available on CD, Vinyl, and via iTunes. "We Have Cause to Be Uneasy" is the title of the fifth chapter in C.S. Lewis' book, Mere Christianity.

== Track listing ==
1. "Ten Dead Dogs" – 4:04
2. "Tilt" – 4:20
3. "Seeing and Believing" – 4:09
4. "Either/Or" – 4:17
5. "Sour Milk" – 5:55
6. "An Atlas to Follow" – 2:35
7. "House of Regret" – 5:10
8. "Crickets" – 5:11
9. "Aretha's Gold" – 6:50
10. "Night Terrors" – 3:34
11. "Land of No Return" – 4:21

== Personnel ==
- Garret Kelly – bass, piano
- Chip Kilpatrick – drums, rhodes, accordion, vocals, programming, bells
- Preston Lovinggood – vocals, acoustic guitar
- Taylor Shaw – electric guitar, rhodes, vocals, toy piano
- Tyler Burkum – guitar ("Tilt", "Either/Or", "Aretha's Gold")
- Matt Pasons – guitar (on remainder of album, banjo on "An Atlas to Follow")
- Kate Taylor – vocals ("Sour Milk", "House of Regret", "Night Terrors")
- Rebekah Fox – vocals ("An Atlas to Follow", "Crickets")
- Katie Crutchfield – vocals ("Seeing and Believing")
