= Tao of the Dead =

Studio album by ...And You Will Know Us by the Trail of Dead
- Released: February 4, 2011 (#Release history)
- Recorded: Summer 2010 at Sonic Ranch, El Paso, Texas
- Genres: Alternative rock; post-hardcore; progressive rock
- Length: 52:22
- Labels: Richter Scale (imprint), Superball Music, Century Media
- Producers: Chris "Frenchie" Smith, Chris Coady

...And You Will Know Us by the Trail of Dead chronology
The Century of Self (2009)	Tao of the Dead (2011)	Lost Songs (2012)

Tao of the Dead (pronounced Dào) is the seventh studio album by Texas rock band ...And You Will Know Us by the Trail of Dead. The first single, "Summer of All Dead Souls", was posted on Spin.com on November 11, 2010, and later on SoundCloud. The digital single released officially on November 29. The album released on CD digipak format, including a limited edition two-disc booklet with 30 minutes of bonus music.

== Background and recording ==
Tao of the Dead was recorded in ten days. The band stripped down to its core four-piece lineup for the record, deviating from the past two records that featured a filled-out six-piece band. This resulted in a stripped-down record with heavy emphasis on guitar. It is a two-part record, each side with a specific musical tuning; Part I in D and Part II in F.

The album can be listened to as 16 different movements or two lengthy tracks. Part I, "Tao of the Dead," is split into eleven tracks, whereas Part II, "Strange News From Another Planet," is five songs combined into one. Conrad Keely, in an interview with Spin.com, described the album's composition. "It's the way I listened to albums when I was a kid, seeing as some of my favorite records were Pink Floyd's Dark Side of the Moon, Yes's Relayer and Close to the Edge... I always liked listening to records that were just a continuous piece, like an orchestra or a symphony."

Cover art and packaging was revealed over a six-day period in December on www.taoofthedead.com, designed by Conrad Keely. When asked in an interview about the title, Jason Reece responded, "It's kind of an impolite joke. We had a Tao Te Ching at the studio and used it as a lyrical reference tool. I said, 'Why don't we call the record "Tao of the Dead"?' It sounds like we're a bunch of pompous assholes. 'Oh yes, we're going to give you the meaning of life here.' Which is really not true at all...We're not Taoists by any means but it's really nice to use some of the text as daily inspirational things to live by. But we read everything. So the "Tao" is just as meaningful as Henry Miller's Tropic of Cancer, which is probably just as Taoist, just with a little more sex."

The first 11 tracks on Disc 2 of the Deluxe Edition are each longer than their correspondent on the standard version, some more significant than others. The songs are mainly the same but have longer fade outs, or extra effects at the end, and sometimes extended intros as well.

== Track listing ==
All lyrics written by Conrad Keely; all music composed by ...And You Will Know Us by the Trail of Dead.

Tao of the Dead Part I: Tao of the Dead
No.	Title	Length
1.	"Introduction: "Let's Experiment""	2:23
2.	"Pure Radio Cosplay"	5:26
3.	"Summer of All Dead Souls"	4:17
4.	"Cover the Days Like a Tidal Wave"	2:51
5.	"Fall of the Empire"	2:27
6.	"The Wasteland"	2:33
7.	"Spiral Jetty"	1:48
8.	"Weight of the Sun (Or the Post-Modern Prometheus)"	2:19
9.	"Pure Radio Cosplay (Reprise)"	3:18
10.	"Ebb Away"	2:41
11.	"The Fairlight Pendant"	5:43

Tao of the Dead Part II: Strange News from Another Planet
No.	Title	Length
12.	"Strange News from Another Planet": I. "Know Your Honor"; II. "Rule by Being Just"; III. "The Ship Impossible"; IV. "Strange Epiphany"; V. "Racing and Hunting"	16:32
Total length:		52:22

Limited Edition Disc One
No.	Title	Length
1.	"Part I: Tao of the Dead"	35:50
2.	"Part II: Strange News from Another Planet"	16:32
Total length:		52:22

Limited Edition Disc Two
No.	Title	Length
1.	"Introduction: Let's Experiment"	2:59
2.	"Pure Radio Cosplay"	6:06
3.	"Summer of All Dead Souls"	4:20
4.	"Cover the Days Like a Tidal Wave"	3:08
5.	"Fall of the Empire"	2:38
6.	"The Wasteland"	2:42
7.	"Spiral Jetty"	2:04
8.	"Weight of the Sun (Or, the Post-Modern Prometheus)"	2:30
9.	"Pure Radio Cosplay (Reprise)"	3:39
10.	"Ebb Away"	2:58
11.	"The Fairlight Pendant"	5:50
12.	"The Bubble Demo"	33:00
Total length:		1:11:54

== Release history ==
- February 4, 2011 GERMANY / AUSTRIA / SWITZERLAND / BENELUX / ITALY
- February 7, 2011 UK / FRANCE / GREECE / DENMARK / NORWAY / REST OF EUROPE
- February 8, 2011 SPAIN / PORTUGAL / NORTH AMERICA
- February 9, 2011 SWEDEN / FINLAND / HUNGARY

== Reception ==
Professional ratings
Review scores
Source	Rating
AllMusic	4/5 stars
The A.V. Club	B
Drowned in Sound	8/10
Pitchfork Media	7.2/10
PopMatters	8/10 stars
Rolling Stone	3/5 stars
Spin	7/10
Sputnikmusic	3.5/5 stars
Tiny Mix Tapes	3.5/5 stars
USA Today	3/4 stars

Tao of the Dead received a score of 73 out of 100 at review aggregator Metacritic based on "generally favorable reviews". musicOMH gave the album all five stars and called it "a genre defining release and a welcome return to boundary surfing music." Rock Sound gave it a score of nine out of ten and said, "While several tracks would sit comfortably on a Best Of ...Trail Of Dead playlist Tao Of The Dead certainly feels like their most consistent collection in years." Paste gave it 8.2 out of ten and called it "some of the most densely constructed art-rock you're likely to hear all year, which only makes the quick process even more impressive." Kerrang! gave it a score of four stars out of five and said of the band, "This infusion of punk is quite some achievement given the album is divided into movements, yet in stripping back to a four-piece they strip away pretentiousness and inject rough-hewn power." Alternative Press also gave it four stars out of five and said the album "hits a full-on prog rock pose with seamless transitions, classical movement structures and lunar background flourishes scraping the Dark Side Of The Moon." No Ripcord gave it eight stars out of ten and called it "a heroic symphony that sounds wholly constructed." BBC Music also gave the album a favorable review and stated that, "both as a standalone record and part of ...Trail of Dead's considerable canon, Tao of the Dead will be remembered as a high point."

Paul Thompson of Pitchfork Media said: "Tao of the Dead does feel, in its songs and structure alike, like the first post-Source Tags record not cooled in the giant shadow of their decade-old triumph; more patient, more potent, more dynamic, less overloaded..." NME gave it a score of seven out of ten and said of the songs, "Sounding as vital as they ever have seven LPs down the track, there's life in them yet." American Songwriter gave it three-and-a-half stars out of five and stated: "There's plenty more on Tao of the Dead that works. After years out in the cold as music critic whipping posts, this should go a long way toward reclaiming some lost luster for Trail of Dead." Consequence of Sound also gave it three-and-a-half stars out of five and stated, "It's important to have moments like this in a concept album that's meant to be taken as one massive 52-minute expression; doing so gives the listener a break and focuses on momentary satisfactions in order to properly digest this cornucopia of solid rock goodness." Filter gave it a score of 70% and stated that "while bombastic and ambitious as ever, Tao suggests that Trail of Dead have once again lost the taste for subtlety and texture that’s past served to elevate their sound from the prog pack."

Other reviews are very average or mixed: The Austin Chronicle gave the album three stars out of five and stated, "The locals' penchant for grandiose concepts and elongated immolation remains, but part one of Tao avoids letting the song cycle run away with the songs." Uncut also gave it three stars and stated that "Despite the epic pretensions of the 16-minute finale, 'Tao Of The Dead Part Two", sadly, this sort of tribute to rock's historical hinterlands yields fewer surprises each time." Mojo likewise gave it three stars out of five and said that the album "hits a sweet spot between prog and power-chords." Dusted Magazine gave it an average review and said it "makes me, by turns, want to improve my attention span and want to listen to something else." Now gave it three stars out of five and said it was "such a cohesive record that when the second track, Pure Radio Cosplay, is reprised midway through, it seems like the end of an intense musical detour rather than a simple replaying of the song." Beats Per Minute gave it a score of 52% and stated that the album "sounds reaching, like the band is lost and looking desperately for an audience and a voice. I hope they start looking somewhere else." Slant Magazine only gave it two stars out of five and stated, "I can't imagine why anyone would want to hear another half-hour of this crap, but if you've got brain cells to spare after Tao of the Dead's wonky, caterwauling sendoff, then by all means, put on your +2 Boots of Moshing and get to it!"

== Chart performance ==
Chart (2011)	Peak position
German Albums Chart	18

== See also ==
- Tao Te Ching
- Cosplay
- "The Post-Modern Prometheus"
- Spiral Jetty
