= The Century of Self =

Studio album by ...And You Will Know Us by the Trail of Dead
- Released: February 17, 2009
- Recorded: 2008 at Bubble Studios, Austin, Texas
- Genre: Art rock
- Length: 53:28
- Labels: Richter Scale; Justice Records
- Producers: Mike McCarthy; Chris Coady; ...And You Will Know Us by the Trail of Dead

...And You Will Know Us by the Trail of Dead chronology
Festival Thyme (2008)	The Century of Self (2009)	Tao of the Dead (2011)

The Century of Self is the sixth studio album by ...And You Will Know Us by the Trail of Dead.

== Production and release ==
This is the first full-length release from Trail of Dead after their Interscope contract. It is also a departure from their studio production style:

"On the last two albums, we were really meticulous recording to click-tracks and doing overdubs... This time, we threw all that out. We learned the songs and all tracked [them] live."

To promote the album, a music video for the radio edit of "Isis Unveiled" was released in April 2009.

It is the last studio album to feature co-founder and guitarist Kevin Allen.

=== Design ===
Album art for The Century of Self was done entirely in blue ballpoint pen by singer Conrad Keely.

== Critical reaction ==
Professional ratings
Aggregate scores
Source	Rating
Metacritic	(68/100)
Review scores
Source	Rating
Allmusic	4/5 stars
The A.V. Club	A−
Entertainment Weekly	B−
Pitchfork Media	(6.8/10)
PopMatters	6/10 stars
Rolling Stone	2.5/5 stars
Slant Magazine	2.5/5 stars
Spin	(8/10)
Tiny Mix Tapes	3/5 stars
USA Today	3/4 stars

On Metacritic, The Century of Self has been given a score of 68 out of 100 based on "generally favorable reviews". Clashmusic.com, the online arm of Clash magazine, gave it a positive review and commented:

"The Century of Self is an album with an accomplished sense of completion – a rolling score of disparate tracks segueing into a focused, poignant collective. And for all its scintillating, visceral energy, it's an album that remains poised and impending, balanced by majestic composition and a patient anticipation for demolishing everything it builds."

The Fly magazine, meanwhile, awarded the record February's Album of the Month and gave it four-and-a-half stars out of five, saying that "The Century of Self underlines why they remain one of the world's most vital, daring and ambitious rock bands." Conrad Keely provided an exclusive illustration to go with The Fly's review, as well as an exclusive track-by-track analysis of the album in The Skinny ahead of its release. The Skinny also gave it four stars out of five and called it "an album that may not get a perfect score, but reaffirms Trail of Dead's role as rock's dark trailblazers." Gigwise.com gave the album all five stars and said, "It has masterpiece written all over it."

Other reviews are positive: Alternative Press gave the album four stars out of five and said it "finds the pride of Austin, Texas, continuing to push baroque prog-rock to orchestral new heights." Billboard gave it a favorable review and stated: "This Texas rock combo returns to form on The Century of Self, with producer Chris Coady stepping in for longtime collaborator Mike McCarthy." The Boston Globe also gave it a favorable review and stated, "After releasing two albums that bored even its most ardent fans, . . . And You Will Know Us by the Trail of Dead is back to blowing minds with The Century of Self." Yahoo! Music gave it seven stars out of ten and said, "The feeling persists that The Century Of Self marks an important moment for ...And You Will Know Us By The Trail Of Dead--one in which they began to weave together their diverging paths and one that, after all, should be hailed as a victory." musicOMH gave it three-and-a-half stars out of five and said that the album ultimately "won't trouble the charts and Trail Of Dead's status as a cult act will be assured. But there's enough here to keep their small group of followers very happy indeed." Paste gave it 6.8 out of ten and said, "Conrad Keely's vocals remain scabby and untreated and there's still a bit much sonic compression, but the relative rawness adds a subtle flair to this record." The Phoenix gave it two-and-a-half stars out of four and said that TOD "settle into a nice groove somewhere between the two".

Other reviews are average, mixed, or negative: The Austin Chronicle gave the album three stars out of five and said it "may be the Austin institution's most conceptually complete work to date, a post-prog cathedral of mythical mini-epics, though it's by no means the band's masterpiece." No Ripcord gave it six stars out of ten and said the album "suffers from careless sequencing, its tempos haphazardly spooned together and flung like high school portions of mashed potatoes and gravy, slopped into sections of the tray with no real purpose or benefit." Drowned in Sound gave it a score of six out of ten and said, "No other band could legitimately produce this record without being accused of extreme plagiarism, and perhaps that goes some way to explaining why, despite its shortcomings, it is still likeable." Uncut gave it three stars out of five and stated, "A familiar sound predominates: an impressive fanfare for a royal procession that never quite arrives." Q also gave it three stars out of five and stated that TOD "have kept faith with their traditional mix of prog pomp and grunge power". Dusted Magazine gave the album a mixed review and said of the band, "The good news is that this is, in fact, a throwback to their earlier work. The bad news is that it's not throwback enough." The now defunct Blender criticized the direction of the band and the album's sound, saying: "There was a time, about six years ago, when this hyperdramatic Texas band seemed like their apocalyptic noise-rock had something meaningful to communicate. That time is long gone." It received only 2 stars out of 5. Under the Radar gave it only three stars out of five and said, "Any way you slice it, [the band] is a sad case in selling out."

== Track listing ==
No.	Title	Length
1.	"The Giants Causeway†"	2:38
2.	"The Far Pavilions"	4:54
3.	"Isis Unveiled"	6:26
4.	"Halcyon Days"	6:36
5.	"Bells of Creation"	5:24
6.	"Fields of Coal"	3:42
7.	"Inland Sea"	4:08
8.	"Luna Park"	4:22
9.	"Pictures of an Only Child‡"	4:44
10.	"Insatiable (One)‡"	2:02
11.	"Ascending"	4:46
12.	"An August Theme"	0:50
13.	"Insatiable (Two)"	3:04

=== Track details ===
† A truncated version of "The Betrayal of Roger Casement & the Irish Brigade" from the Festival Thyme EP.

‡ The track listing on the digipak back cover is incorrect, as it switches "Pictures of an Only Child" and "Insatiable (One)". The lyrics in the booklet keep the correct running order.

Alternate edits of "Bells of Creation" and "Inland Sea" are also included on Festival Thyme.

"I'm the monster, and I exist/On this summit, I am lost" on "Insatiable (Two)" refers to the Orang Pendek, a cryptid which lyricist Conrad Keely believes will be discovered in the next decade.

== Personnel ==
Songs by: Jay Leo Phillips, Clay Morris, Kevin Allen, Conrad Keely, Jason Reece and Aaron Ford.

Engineers: Chris Coady; Jason Buntz; David Tolomei; Jim Volentine; Frenchie Smith.

Additional vocals by: Dragons of Zynth, Yeasayer Brenda Radney Jonathan Nesvadba, Joel Nesvadba and Paul Banks.

Recorded at: Bubble Studios, Austin TX.

== Chart history ==
Chart (2009)	Peak position
US Billboard 200	169
US Billboard Independent Albums	22

== See also ==
- The Century of the Self (2002)
- The Far Pavilions (1978)
- Giant's Causeway
- Halcyon days
