= Wild Sweet Orange =

American indie rock band

- Wild Sweet Orange live at WorkPlay in Birmingham, Alabama in December 2007.

Background information
- Origin: Homewood, Alabama, United States
- Genres: Indie rock Emo (old material)
- Years active: 2004–2010
- Labels: Canvasback Music, Earfood
- Members: Preston Lovinggood (vocals/guitar); Chip Kilpatrick (drums)
- Past members: Matt Parsons (guitar); Taylor Shaw (guitar); Garret Kelly (bass & guitar)
- Website: http://www.wildsweetmusic.com/

Wild Sweet Orange was an American indie rock band from Homewood, Alabama. In early 2008 their song "Land of No Return" was featured on Grey's Anatomy. The band performed the song "Ten Dead Dogs" live on the Late Show with David Letterman on June 23, 2008. Their first full LP, We Have Cause to Be Uneasy, was released on July 29, 2008. Wild Sweet Orange has opened for bands such as Counting Crows, Guster, Augustana, and Gringo Star.

On September 7, 2010, the band announced on their Facebook page that they were calling it quits.

Vocalist Preston Lovinggood continued with other projects, including a successfully funded Kickstarter campaign which ended in 2017.

On August 28, 2017, the band's Facebook page announced that "something is brewing".

The band released the single Plans in 2022.

== Discography ==
=== EPs ===
- 2007: House of Regret EP
- 2007: The Whale EP (Nervous Blood/TAO)

=== Albums ===
- 2008: We Have Cause to Be Uneasy (Canvasback Music)
