= Madonna (...And You Will Know Us by the Trail of Dead album) =

Studio album by ...And You Will Know Us by the Trail of Dead
- Released: October 19, 1999
- Genre: Post-hardcore; alternative rock; indie rock; noise rock
- Length: 45:28
- Label: Merge
- Producer: Mike McCarthy

...And You Will Know Us by the Trail of Dead chronology
...And You Will Know Us by the Trail of Dead (1998)	Madonna (1999)	Source Tags & Codes (2002)

Singles from Madonna
- 1. "Mistakes & Regrets" Released: October 2, 2000

Professional ratings
Review scores
Source	Rating
AllMusic	4/5 stars
Alternative Press	4/5
Melody Maker	4.5/5 stars
NME	8/10
Pitchfork	8.4/10 (1999); 8.7/10 (2019)
Q	3/5 stars
Select	4/5
Spin	8/10

Madonna is the second studio album by the American band ...And You Will Know Us by the Trail of Dead. It was released on October 19, 1999, by Merge Records.

== Background and production ==
The cover art features a Hindu goddess painting by Conrad Keely called Portrait of Kali. The back art is another painting, Tribute to Ed Wicklander by James Neslo, a nod to a Seattle-based sculptor.

== Critical reception ==
Trouser Press wrote that "a huge guitar sound (My Bloody Valentine huge) dominates, buttressed by swift drum rolls and snare cracks."

== Track listing ==
No.	Title	Length
1.	"And You Will Know Them..."	0:31
2.	"Mistakes & Regrets"	3:46
3.	"Totally Natural"	4:16
4.	"Blight Takes All"	4:43
5.	"Clair de Lune"	3:26
6.	"Flood of Red"	3:53
7.	"Children of the Hydra's Teeth"	1:22
8.	"Mark David Chapman"	4:10
9.	"Up from Redemption"	0:22
10.	"Aged Dolls"	7:17
11.	"The Day the Air Turned Blue"	1:03
12.	"A Perfect Teenhood"	5:17
13.	"Sigh Your Children" (contains a hidden track)	5:22

== Personnel ==
- Conrad Keely
- Jason Reece
- Kevin Allen
- Neil Busch (uncredited)
- Additional musicians: Julie Pomerleau, Carolyn Cremona, Clay Embry, Jimmy Burdine (horns), Steven Hall (drums).
