= A Roman Scandal (band) =

- Origin: Austin, Texas
- Genres: Synthpop, dream pop, indie, indie rock
- Years active: 1999–2001
- Label: Independent
- Past members: Jason Reece, Tyler Jacobsen (died 2019), Sean O'Neal, Chris Bultman, Alex Killough

A Roman Scandal was a synthpop band from Austin, Texas active from 1999 through 2001. Members included Tyler Jacobsen (1977–2019) (from Denim and Diamonds and OMD 20/20), Sean O'Neal (from the Arm and This Microwave World, and currently a writer for The Onion's A.V. Club), Chris Bultman (from the Daniel Johnston Band, Jad Fair, This Microwave World, and Denim and Diamonds), Alex Killough (from OMD 20/20), and Jason Reece (from ...And You Will Know Us by the Trail of Dead).
