= Source Tags & Codes =

Studio album by ...And You Will Know Us by the Trail of Dead
- Released: February 26, 2002
- Genres: Alternative rock; post-hardcore; art rock
- Length: 45:54 (US release); 50:19 (International and LP release)
- Label: Interscope
- Producers: Mike McCarthy, ...And You Will Know Us by the Trail of Dead

...And You Will Know Us by the Trail of Dead chronology
Relative Ways (2001)	Source Tags & Codes (2002)	The Secret of Elena's Tomb (2003)

Singles from Source Tags & Codes
- 1. "Another Morning Stoner" Released: 2002; 2. "Relative Ways" Released: 2002

Source Tags & Codes is the third album by American rock band ...And You Will Know Us by the Trail of Dead and the first distributed by a major record label. It was released on February 26, 2002 to wide critical acclaim. The album is often cited as the band's finest work.

Music videos were produced for "Another Morning Stoner" and "Relative Ways", which saw airplay on MTV2.

== Recording and production ==
After releasing two albums on indie record imprints, Trail of Dead signed a multi-release deal with Interscope Records and began recording a follow-up to 1999's Madonna with the same producer, Mike McCarthy. Their major label budget improved recording quality and allowed intricate orchestral pieces, yielding a sound texture unlike previous records. Source Tags & Codes was recorded in Cotati, California and mixed in Nashville, Tennessee on a budget of 150,000 dollars.

== Music ==
The song 'Baudelaire' refers to the French poet, Charles Baudelaire, and 'Days of Being Wild' is named after the Hong Kong film of the same name. "After the Laughter" samples the song "Someday (You'll Want Me to Want You)". The song "Homage" is a homage to Unwound. On the day "Homage" was recorded, producer Mike McCarthey woke Keely up that morning by throwing cold water in his face for him to be aggressive enough to record the drum track.

In "It Was There That I Saw You": "Keely had intended to conjure up the intoxicating thrill of living in Austin Texas in the mid-nineties, before America had gone to shit. The inspiration came from a girl he used to work with that he had a crush on, and several late nights spent in the company of people on drugs"

The title of "Another Morning Stoner" refers to getting an erection in the morning or smoking marijuana. The song is inspired by Keely's relationship with his ex-girlfriend who was raised Christian. "It recalls a moral dilemma he underwent when he realized that eventually theology would drive them apart more than anything else, because of his strong negative feelings towards organized religion."

== Critical reception ==
Professional ratings
Aggregate scores
Source	Rating
Metacritic	85/100
Review scores
Source	Rating
AllMusic	5/5 stars
Blender	4/5 stars
Chicago Sun-Times	3/4 stars
Entertainment Weekly	A−
The Guardian	2/5 stars
Los Angeles Times	3.5/4 stars
NME	8/10
Pitchfork	10/10
Rolling Stone	3.5/5 stars
Uncut	4/5 stars

Source Tags & Codes was met with critical acclaim, receiving a score of 85 out of 100 on review aggregate site Metacritic, indicating "universal acclaim". The Austin Chronicle's Michael Chamy called Source Tags & Codes "an album that absolutely cannot be ignored", while Billboard's Annie Zaleski stated that "what makes Source Tags & Codes such an amazing album is how the band teeters on the edge of this implosion but always yanks its songs back from collapse at the very last second." Noel Murray of The A.V. Club wrote that the band "plays imaginative alt-rock with intense passion, and Source Tags & Codes lets the pressure build exquisitely." Noting its "angular, Sonic Youth-style guitar and earnest anger", Blender's Michael Leonard credited the album for being "more engaging than many of [the band's] post-rock peers", while Uncut similarly wrote that "compared to so many noisemongers, TOD understand that restraint enables unleashed firepower to be exhilarating and awesome." Matt LeMay of Pitchfork awarded Source Tags & Codes a perfect score and wrote that the album "will take you in, rip you to shreds, piece you together, lick your wounds clean, and send you back into the world with a concurrent sense of loss and hope," though Conrad Keely considers this rating to be "preposterous" as "it is clearly nowhere close to a perfect album".

Hobey Echlin of The Village Voice wrote that Source Tags & Codes "captures the fuzzy-math sound from too many gray-area indie bands—and it rocks hard where geezers like Mercury Rev just drift away." Mojo described the album as "not a crossover record, but invigorating." Among average reviews, Q felt that the band "has reached a point where the need for convention outweighs the joy of using guitars as weapons." In The Village Voice, Robert Christgau awarded the album a "dud" rating, indicating "a bad record whose details rarely merit further thought." While noting that "there's a fantastic EP in here somewhere", Maddy Costa of The Guardian nonetheless felt that the album "is ablaze with emotion – it roars and pulses and oozes angst – but it never inspires".

Kludge included it on their list of best albums of 2002.

By 2005, Source Tags & Codes sales had surpassed 100,000 units.

== Legacy ==
In 2009, Source Tags & Codes was placed at number 100 in Pitchfork's list of the top 200 albums of the 2000s.

In a 2011 article, the BBC's Mike Driver calls it "one of the very finest rock albums of recent history," and "a masterpiece of its time, Source Tags & Codes really does deserve to be held in as high regard as In Rainbows or Funeral, or any other critical triumph of recent history."

== Track listing ==
All tracks are written by ...And You Will Know Us by the Trail of Dead.

No.	Title	Length
1.	"Invocation" (co-written with James Olsen (Note: Not included on the North American release))	1:32
2.	"It Was There That I Saw You"	3:57
3.	"Another Morning Stoner"	4:33
4.	"Baudelaire"	4:16
5.	"Homage"	3:29
6.	"How Near How Far"	3:55
7.	"Life Is Elsewhere" ( (Note: Not included on the North American release))	0:55
8.	"Heart in the Hand of the Matter"	4:48
9.	"Monsoon"	5:53
10.	"Days of Being Wild" (co-written with James Olsen)	3:27
11.	"Relative Ways"	4:03
12.	"After the Laughter"	1:15
13.	"Source Tags & Codes" (includes hidden track)	6:08
14.	"Blood Rites" (bonus track (Note: Not included on the North American release))	1:58

== Charts ==
Chart (2002)	Peak position
UK Albums (Official Charts)	73
German Albums (Offizielle Top 100)	64
Scottish Albums (Official Charts)	49

== Personnel ==
Credits adapted from the album's liner notes.

...And You Will Know Us by the Trail of Dead

- Conrad Keely – lead vocals (on "It Was There That I Saw You", "Another Morning Stoner", "How Near How Far", "Relative Ways", "Source Tags & Codes" and "Blood Rites"), guitar, drums (on "Homage", "Heart in the Hand of the Matter", and "Days of Being Wild") string arrangements, art direction, artwork
- Jason Reece – lead vocals (on "Homage", "Heart in the Hand of the Matter" and "Days of Being Wild"), drums, artwork
- Neil Busch – lead vocals (on "Baudelaire" and "Monsoon"), bass
- Kevin Allen - guitar

Additional personnel

- David Angel – violin
- David Bryant – engineering
- John Catchings – cello
- Sharon Corbitt – management
- Gene Cornelilus – engineering
- Larry Cragg – guitar and amplifier rental
- Eric Darken – additional percussion, bells, timpani
- David Davidson – violin
- Jason D'Ottavio – management
- Connie Ellisore – violin
- Carl Gorodetsky – violin
- Traci Goudie – art direction, layout
- David Grissom – guitar and amplifier rental
- Jim Hoke – tenor saxophone, baritone saxophone, bass harmonica
- Anthony Lamarchina – cello
- Roger Lian – editing
- Jim Lightman – engineering
- Mike McCarthy – engineering, production
- James Olsen – artwork, backing vocals
- Tetsuya Otani – management, voice translation
- John Painter – string arrangements, flugelhorn, trumpet
- Jennifer Quinn – management
- Cheryle Rennick – recording
- Mooka Rennick – recording
- Leslie Richter – engineering
- Pam Sixfin – violin
- Jim Vollentine – engineering
- Howie Weinberg – mastering
- Kristen Wilkinson – viola
- King Williams – shortwave radio rental
