= Festival Thyme =

EP by ...And You Will Know Us by the Trail of Dead
- Released: October 21, 2008
- Labels: Richter Scale Records, Justice Records

...And You Will Know Us by the Trail of Dead chronology
Adult Swim Presents: ...And You Will Know Us by the Trail of Dead on Tour with Dethklok (2007)	Festival Thyme (2008)	The Century of Self (2009)

Professional ratings
Aggregate scores
Source	Rating
Metacritic	(67/100)
Review scores
Source	Rating
AbsolutePunk	77%
Alternative Press	3.5/5 stars
The Austin Chronicle	3/5 stars
Paste	(6.5/10)
Pitchfork Media	(6.2/10)
PopMatters	6/10 stars
The Skinny	2/5 stars
Spectrum Culture	(2.5/5)

Festival Thyme is an EP precursor to the full-length album The Century of Self by the American art rock band ...And You Will Know Us by the Trail of Dead. It was released through Richter Scale Records imprint, via Justice Records.

== Track listings ==
Compact Disc and all other formats

1. "Bells of Creation" (Machete Mix) – 5:32
2. "Inland Sea" (EP Edit) – 3:41
3. "Festival Thyme" – 2:17
4. "The Betrayal of Roger Casement & the Irish Brigade" – 5:44

Limited edition vinyl picture disc

1. "Bells of Creation" (Machete Mix)
2. "Within Your Reach" (Paul Westerberg)
3. "Festival Thyme"
4. "The Betrayal of Roger Casement & the Irish Brigade"

== Personnel ==
- Conrad Keely – vocals, guitar, drums, piano
- Jason Reece – drums, vocals, guitar
- Kevin Allen – guitar, vocals
- Aaron Ford – drums, piano, vocals
- Jay Phillips – bass, vocals
- Clay Morris – piano, vocals
