= The Secret of Elena's Tomb =

EP by ...And You Will Know Us by the Trail of Dead
- Released: April 1, 2003
- Studio: Blackbird (Berry Hill, Tennessee)
- Genre: Rock
- Length: 19:17
- Label: Interscope

...And You Will Know Us by the Trail of Dead chronology
Source Tags & Codes (2002)	The Secret of Elena's Tomb (2003)	Worlds Apart (2005)

Professional ratings
Aggregate scores
Source	Rating
Metacritic	76/100
Review scores
Source	Rating
AllMusic	3/5 stars
Alternative Press	4/5
Drowned in Sound	4.5/5
Filter	88%
Neumu.net	7/10 stars
No Ripcord	7/10
Pitchfork Media	6.7/10
PopMatters	(positive)
Spin	B+
Tiny Mix Tapes	3/5 stars

The Secret of Elena's Tomb is the EP follow up to Source Tags & Codes by Austin, TX band ...And You Will Know Us by the Trail of Dead. The title is inspired by the story of Carl Tanzler.

== Track listing ==
1. "Mach Schau" – 3:49
2. "All St. Day" – 3:53
3. "Crowning of a Heart" – 3:30
4. "Counting Off the Days" – 3:11
5. "Intelligence" – 4:55

The enhanced section contains the videos of "Another Morning Stoner" and "Relative Ways" as well as a live video of "All St. Day".
