= IX (...And You Will Know Us by the Trail of Dead album) =

Studio album by ...And You Will Know Us by the Trail of Dead
- Released: October 10, 2014
- Recorded: Sonic Ranch
- Genres: Post-hardcore; alternative rock
- Length: 47:37 (standard edition); 73:07 (deluxe edition)
- Labels: Richter Scale; Superball Music
- Producer: Chris "Frenchie" Smith

...And You Will Know Us by the Trail of Dead chronology
Lost Songs (2012)	IX (2014)	X: The Godless Void and Other Stories (2020)

IX is the ninth studio album by the Austin, Texas alternative rock rock band ...And You Will Know Us by the Trail of Dead, released October 10, 2014, on Superball Music.

== Composition ==
Jason Reece explained in an interview that the band was going for a record consisting of many instrumental tracks. Several instrumentals were written, but ended up writing songs that "had a more personal lyrical bent", departing from the last album's very aggressive and political lyrics. As for the sound, it was inspired by Slave Ambient and Lost in the Dream, both records by The War on Drugs: "This layered Krautrock kind of vibe. We were thinking of Echo And The Bunnymen, Ocean Rain. These dense and bigger sounding albums. We were kind of into some 80’s music, Psychedelic Furs. Which is funny cause we’re not really a band that’s into the new wave sound, I don’t think we’ve ever made an 80’s sounding record. That’s kind of what we were jamming out to, the early 80’s sounds. Going for more of a Peter Gabriel thing, where you don’t use any cymbals, heavy toms and stuff like that were sort of the things we were kind of touching upon."

== Critical reception ==
Professional ratings
Aggregate scores
Source	Rating
Metacritic	75/100
Review scores
Source	Rating
AllMusic	3.5/5 stars
Clash	7/10
Consequence of Sound	B−
DIY	4/5 stars
Exclaim!	7/10
NME	8/10
Pitchfork Media	7.2/10
PopMatters	7/10
The Skinny	3/5 stars
Sputnikmusic	3/5

Reviews for IX were mostly positive upon release, with an Metacritic average of 75/100, indicating generally favorable reviews.

A review in Pitchfork stated,

While the band may have struggled in the past to reconcile their post-hardcore roots with their art-rock ambitions*,* more often than not, "IX" marks the spot.

In MXDWN, Elliot Greiner wrote,

For a band that started out in post-punk and somehow wandered into the feathery territory of art-rock, "IX" is a mediocre answer to a career’s worth of solid material. While not terrible, it is a far shot from all right, and an even farther shot from (some of) what they’ve put out in the past.

== Track listing ==
No.	Title	Length
1.	"The Doomsday Book"	3:32
2.	"Jaded Apostles"	4:05
3.	"A Million Random Digits"	3:08
4.	"Lie Without a Liar"	3:22
5.	"The Ghost Within"	3:15
6.	"The Dragonfly Queen"	2:57
7.	"How to Avoid Huge Ships"	4:47
8.	"Bus Lines"	6:09
9.	"Lost in the Grand Scheme"	7:26
10.	"Like Summer Tempests Came His Tears"	3:42
11.	"Sound of the Silk"	5:18
Total length:		47:37

Deluxe Edition Bonus Tracks
No.	Title	Length
12.	"Keep Warm Fire"	2:27
13.	"Feelings and How to Destroy Them"	3:30
Total length:		53:34

=== Bonus CD: Tao of the Dead Pt III EP ===
No.	Title	Length
1.	"Tao of the Dead Part III" I. "Gods We Really Are"; II. "Once the War Was Fought"; III. "Time's Twisting Line"; IV. "Divisive Measures" V. "Gods We Really Are (Reprise)"	19:27
Total length:		1:13:07

== Charts ==
Chart (2014)	Peak position
Belgian Albums (Ultratop Flanders)	168
German Albums (Offizielle Top 100)	63
