= Mike McCarthy (producer) =

American record producer

- Birth name: Michael McCarthy
- Born: February 22, 1965 (age 60)
- Origin: Cincinnati, Ohio, United States
- Occupation: Record producer
- Years active: 1984-present
- Website: mikemccarthyproducer.com

Michael McCarthy (born February 22, 1965, Cincinnati, Ohio, United States) is an American record producer, who has been recording music since 1984.

McCarthy has worked as a producer on five Spoon albums, from Girls Can Tell until Ga Ga Ga Ga Ga, as well as Patty Griffin's Children Running Through, Sound Team's Movie Monster, and albums by …And You Will Know Us by the Trail of Dead, The Features and The Sun (Don't Let Your Baby Have All the Fun).

McCarthy lives in Nashville, Tennessee.

== Discography ==
Spoon

- Ga Ga Ga Ga Ga (produced / recorded / mixed), Merge
- Gimme Fiction (produced / recorded / mixed), Merge/Matador
- Kill the Moonlight (produced / recorded / mixed), Merge
- Girls Can Tell (produced / recorded / mixed), Merge

Heartless Bastards

- The Mountain (produced / recorded / mixed), Fat Possum Records

Dead Confederate

- Wrecking Ball (produced / recorded / mixed), TAO/Razor and Tie Records

Wild Sweet Orange

- We Have Cause to Be Uneasy (produced / recorded / mixed), Canvasback Records

...And You Will Know Us by the Trail of Dead

- So Divided (produced / recorded / mixed), Interscope
- Worlds Apart (produced / recorded / mixed), Interscope
- The Secret of Elena's Tomb (produced / recorded / mixed), Interscope
- Source Tags & Codes (produced / recorded / mixed)
- Relative Ways EP (produced / recorded / mixed), Interscope
- Madonna (produced / recorded / mixed), Merge

Patty Griffin

- Children Running Through (produced / recorded / mixed) ATO records

Lee Ann Womack

- Something Worth Leaving Behind (produced / recorded / mixed), MCA
- I Hope You Dance (recorded / mixed), MCA
- The Lonely, The Lonesome & The Gone (produced / engineer / mixer), ATO

The Features

- Exhibit A (produced / recorded), Universal

AM Taxi

- We Don't Stand a Chance (produced / recorded / mixed), Virgin

Fastball

- Keep Your Wig On (produced Recorded), Ryko

Forget Cassettes

- Instruments of Action (produced / recorded / mixed), Theory 8

Goudie

- Peep Show (produced / recorded / mixed), TMC/Elektra

Sound Team

- Movie Monster (produced / recorded / mixed), Capitol

Jack Ingram

- Electric (produced / recorded / mixed), Sony

Sixteen Deluxe

- The Moonman is Blue (produced / recorded / mixed), Sugar Fix

Carson McHone

- Carousel (produced / recorded / mixed), Nine Mile Records / Loose
