= Conrad Keely =

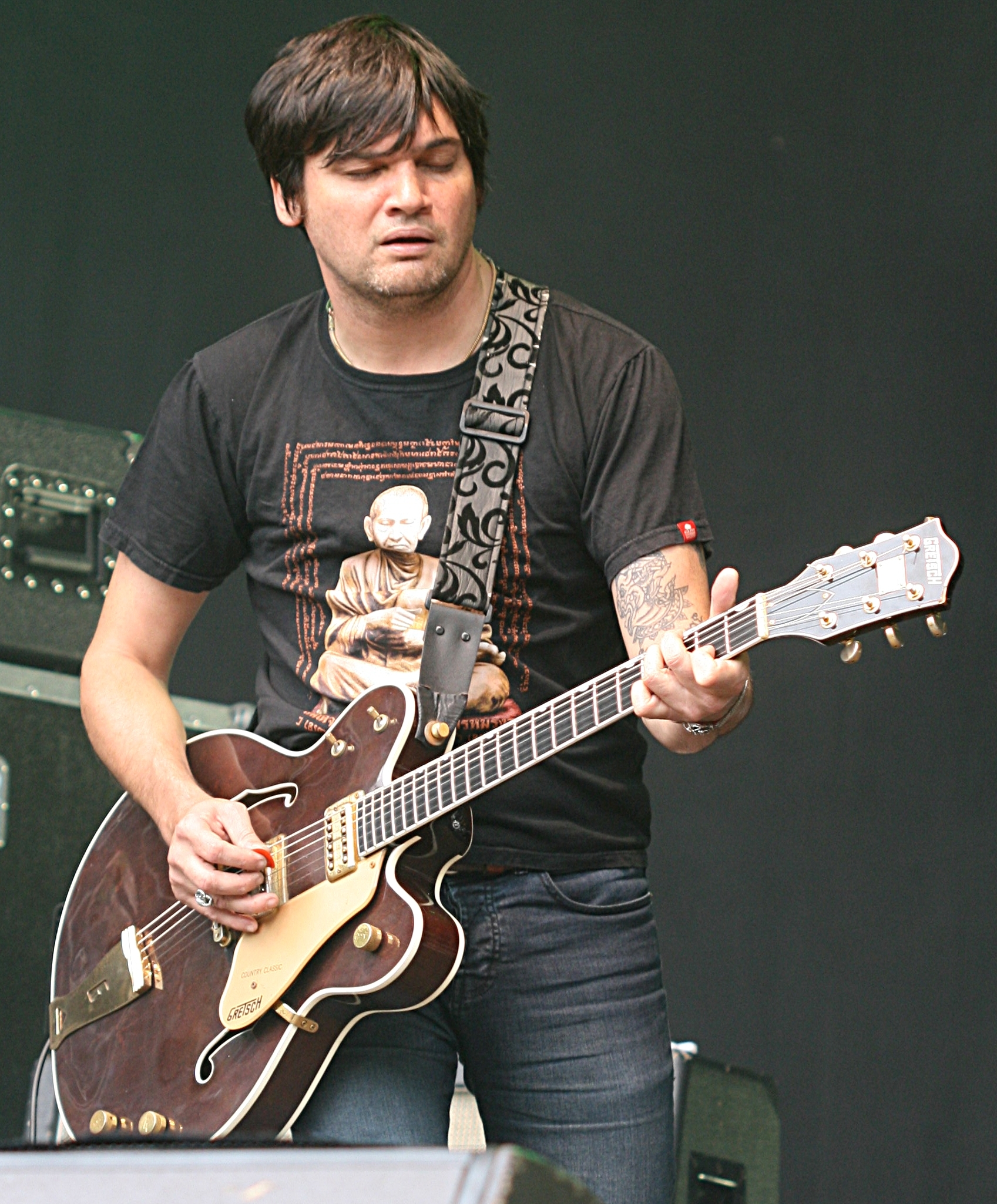
- Keely on the Main Stage of the Taubertal Festival 2013

Background information
- Also known as: Conrad Francis Sobsamai
- Born: 15 May 1972 (age 54); Nuneaton, Warwickshire, England
- Genres: Alternative rock, progressive rock, post-hardcore
- Occupations: Musician, songwriter, singer, artist
- Instruments: Vocals, guitar, drums, piano, keyboards, bass
- Years active: 1994–present
- Labels: Trance Records, Merge Records, Interscope Records, Richter Scale, Superball Music
- Website: http://www.conradkeely.com/

Conrad Keely (born 15 May 1972) is a musician, artist, and writer known primarily as the songwriter and lead singer for the American rock band ...And You Will Know Us by the Trail of Dead.

== Background ==
Born in Nuneaton, Warwickshire, England of Irish and Thai descent, Keely grew up in the neighbouring town of Bedworth before he and his mother moved to the U.S. state of Hawaii when he was five years old. Keely and family returned to Bedworth when he was eight for three years before returning to the United States. In 1988, while in high school in Oahu, Keely met Jason Reece, with whom he would later form ...And You Will Know Us by the Trail of Dead. Keely then moved with his mother to Olympia, Washington in 1989 where he attended The Evergreen State College. Reece joined Keely in Washington a short time later, and the two tried forming bands in Olympia's underground music scene. Finding little success, in 1994 Keely and Reece moved to Austin, Texas to form bands. Before signing a contract to Interscope Records with ...And You Will Know Us by the Trail of Dead, Keely primarily worked clerical office jobs in Austin while playing with the band at night.

Keely relocated from Austin to Brooklyn, New York in 2008, and then moved to Phnom Penh, Cambodia in 2012 after being "fed up with American life." Keely visited the country while travelling with his father after an ...And You Will Know Us by the Trail of Dead Australian tour and decided to stay. Keely expressed being tired with America and moving overseas as early as 2003. Since moving to Cambodia, he has traveled around the country, performing as part of a cultural exchange. Although Keely does not speak Khmer, he says the country is "a noisy place full of weird sounds – temples, monks chanting, loud speakers blaring, egg sellers and vendors. I need that chaos, and I think it helps that it's in a language I don't understand." While Keely predominantly grew up in the United States, he holds and uses an Irish passport and is not an American citizen. Keely moved back to Austin, Texas in 2018 to maintain his Green card status.

== Work ==
=== ...And You Will Know Us by the Trail of Dead ===
Keely founded ...And You Will Know Us by the Trail of Dead with childhood friend and fellow musician Jason Reece in 1994 when the two moved to Austin, Texas. Originally planning to form two bands, with Keely on vocals and guitar with Reece drumming in one band and switching roles in the other band, the two soon settled on one band where they swap duties depending on the song. After initially a duo performing as You Will Know Us by the Trail of Dead, the two soon expanded the name and the lineup. ...And You Will Know Us by the Trail of Dead quickly became known for their "anarchic" live shows and their sound, described by AllMusic's Jason Ankeny as "an unlikely but powerful combination of punk fury and prog rock ambition." By 1998 the group signed with Trance Records and released their eponymous debut album. After a second independent album, this time on Merge Records, the band signed to major-label Interscope Records in 2001. The critically acclaimed Source Tags & Codes was released in 2002, and since then the band had released six more studio albums.

=== Solo work and other bands ===
Keely released his debut solo album, Original Machines, on January 22, 2016 on Superball Music. Songs for the album were primarily written while traveling in Cambodia, but a few were written while on tour with ...And You Will Know Us by the Trail of Dead, recording them in the back of the tour bus. On the sound of his first work without the band, while speaking with Steve Bell of Australia's The Music, Keely said that he was "given more freedom to explore other textures and stuff that I might not usually" while having "the liberty to create something that's outside of [Trail of Dead's] rock paradigm." He also plays wurlitzer and fiddle for Austin, Texas country-folk band Brothers and Sisters.

== Musical style and influence ==
=== Musical influence ===
Keely states in interviews that his biggest influences growing up were classic, progressive, and alternative rock; listening to bands like Pink Floyd, Rush, and The Replacements. The style and sound of the Trail of Dead album Tao of the Dead came from such influences, like Pink Floyd's The Wall, Yes albums like Close to the Edge and Relayer, and Rush's Hemispheres, with Keely telling William Goodman of Spin that "I always liked listening to records that were just a continuous piece, like an orchestra or a symphony." Bandmate Jason Reece claims he got Keely into punk music and Keely makes the same claim for influence on Reece regarding prog, with the two swapping cassettes of music throughout school.

=== Musical style ===
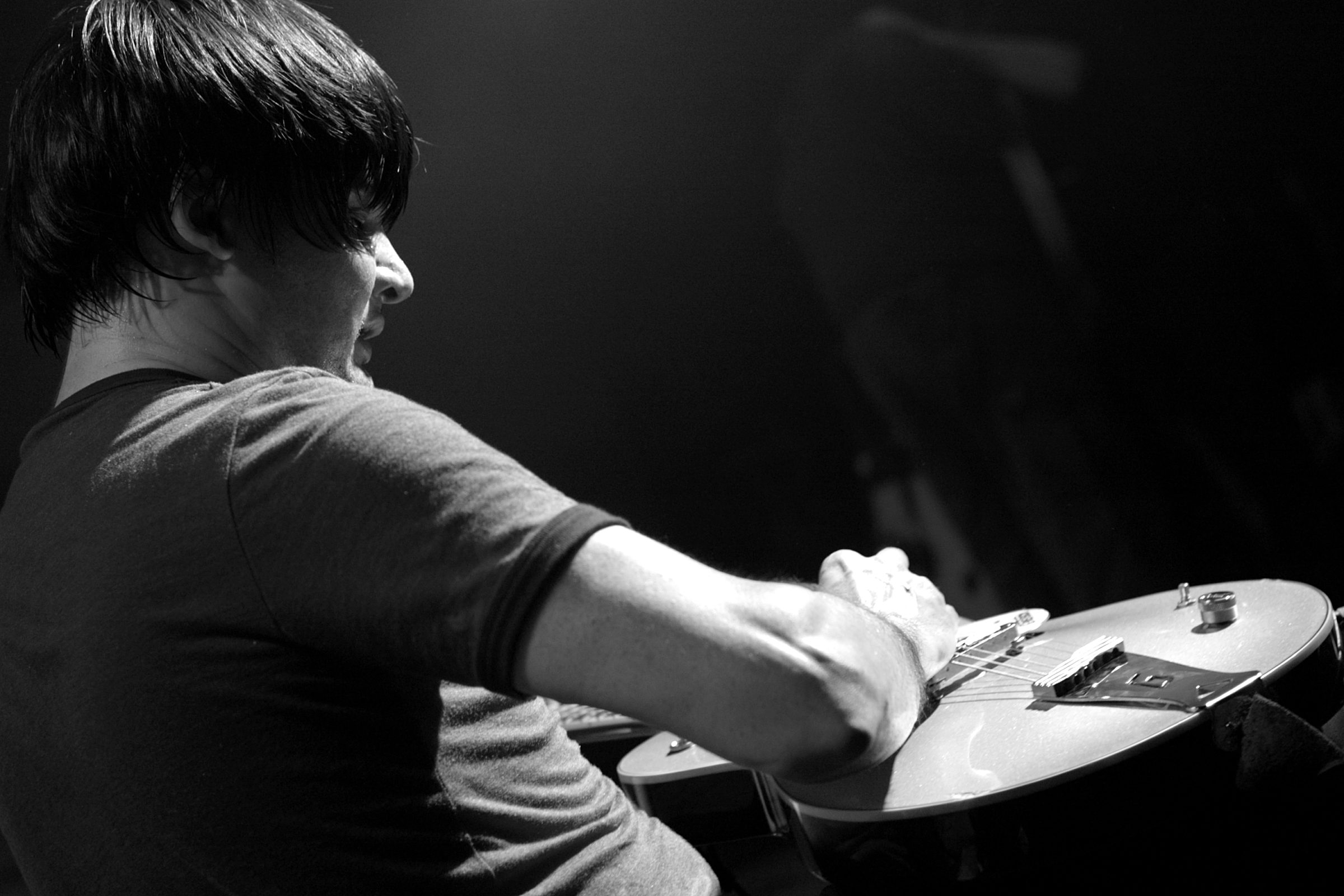
Keely at a concert in 2005

Keely's songwriting often shows the influence of progressive rock, as the aforementioned Tao of the Dead illustrates. Other songs often have political or social meaning characteristic of punk music; for example, the song "Up to Infinity" from Lost Songs about the Syrian Civil War and the first track "Open Doors" is about human trafficking in Cambodia. Many tracks on the album Worlds Apart are about social unrest in the United States after the attacks of September 11th and consumer culture, and Caryn Ganz of Spin described the writing on So Divided as "lyrically bleak."

2014's IX showed a change in Keely's style to a much more introspective one in writing and sound. While never intentionally seeking to change musical direction, Keely says that he was going through "a lot of personal stuff" while writing the songs for the album and the result was a lyrically personal album. After moving to Cambodia in 2012, Keely fathered a son. He and the mother split up prior to recording IX, and Keely admits that the sense of melancholy and loss came into the album, with songs like "The Ghost Within" and "The Dragonfly Queen" reflecting these feelings and events. The title of the album, IX, also reflects these feelings, being a reference to the planet Ix from Dune, a harsh and cold world that served as a prison.

== Artwork and writing ==
Keely is an avid visual artist. He claims he has been drawing his entire life and that he had an agent at the age of seventeen, displaying works at science fiction conventions. He studied art at The Evergreen State College but claims he "didn't learn anything," and that he quit art "symbolically" to focus on music, as he cannot quit something that is part of who he is. Keely considers himself a modern artist, and much of his work is inspired by comic illustration. He's stated his admiration for comics, that "they teach you how to draw." Keely is a fan of the X-Men and even noted that, as a reference to Secret Wars, he wanted to include a New Mutants character in the collage cover art of Worlds Apart. Despite his enjoyment of comics and the lowbrow art movement, he's said he finds little emotion or enjoyment in modern art and that he prefers "old art." Keely wrote an article for Filter magazine in 2003 titled, "Modern Art is Shit," in which he lambasts the modern art movement. Keely noted that he received a considerable amount of criticism for the article.

Keely has commonly incorporated his drawings and paintings into Trail of Dead's album art, designing and illustrating most all of their albums. He believes the cover art and album packaging for Madonna played a part in ...And You Will Know Us by the Trail of Dead being noticed by Jimmy Iovine, co-founder of Interscope Records, which lead to their major label deal. He has also done album art for other musicians and has displayed his art worldwide, including a show also featuring Melissa Auf der Maur.

Keely has been working on a science fiction graphic novel titled Strange News From Another Planet for many years. The story is "portions of [Trail of Dead's] mythology," and artwork, characters, and themes from the story have been included in the ...And You Will Know Us by the Trail of Dead albums Tao of the Dead, Lost Songs, and the Tao of the Dead III EP.
