= ...And You Will Know Us by the Trail of Dead =

American post-hardcore band

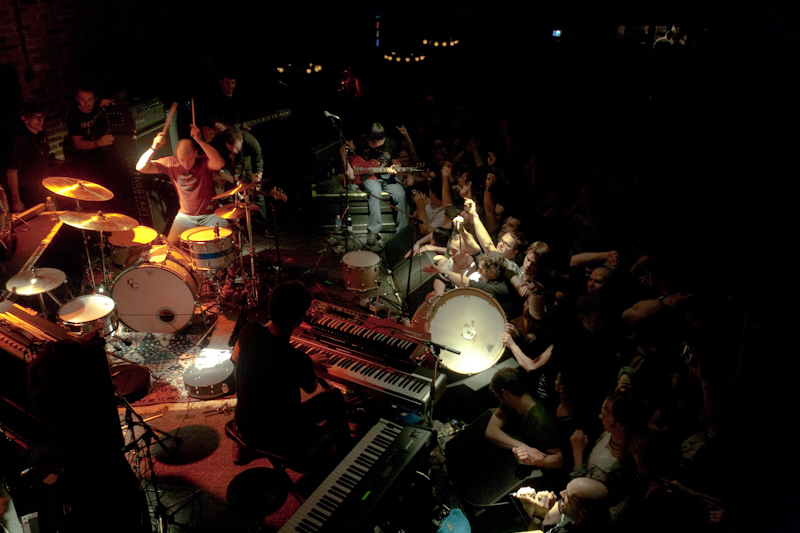
- ...And You Will Know Us By the Trail of Dead performing in Vancouver in March 2009

Background information
- Origin: Austin, Texas, U.S.
- Genres: Alternative rock; post-hardcore; progressive rock; art rock
- Years active: 1994–2023; 2025–present
- Labels: Trance Syndicate; Merge; Domino; Interscope; Richter Scale; Superball Music; Justice Records; Dine Alone; Inside Out
- Past members: Conrad Keely; Jason Reece; Alec Padron; Ben Redman; AJ Vincent; John Dowey; Neil Busch; Kevin Allen; David Longoria; Clay Morris; Deanne Rowley; Doni Schroader; Danny Wood; Jay Leo Phillips; Aaron Ford; Paul Westmoreland; Brandon Wilson; Autry Fulbright II; Jamie Miller; James Barclay
- Website: www.trailofdeadband.com

...And You Will Know Us by the Trail of Dead (often abbreviated as Trail of Dead), are an American alternative rock band from Austin, Texas, formed in 1994. The band's earliest stable lineup consisted of Conrad Keely, Jason Reece, Kevin Allen and Neil Busch, though for most of the band's history Keely and Reece were the core members with other musicians serving for varying lengths of time. Trail of Dead had a cult following and were known for their energetic and protracted live performances. Between 1998 and 2023, the band released eleven studio albums and five EPs along with one live album and twenty-two singles. The artwork for all of the albums was created by Keely (who is also a painter) using various media. This artwork has recurring mythical and historical themes.

Their latest studio album, XI: Bleed Here Now, was released on July 15, 2022. In February 2023, the band posted on Instagram an image reading "Trail closed" which created rumours that the band had broken up. Although the band still exists, Conrad Keely later clarified they had no immediate plans to either tour nor make any more music in the traditional sense, citing a disastrous final tour, exhaustion, and the inhospitable state of the music industry towards smaller bands as the main drivers behind their decision.

== History ==
=== Formation ===
Keely and Reece have been friends since their youth, and originally in Hawaii. They each formed their first bands in Olympia, Washington, where Keely studied at The Evergreen State College. Keely, a songwriter and bassist named James Olsen and a guitarist (Paul Westmoreland) started a band in the early 1990s. The band was called varied things before settling on "Benedict Gehlen" (named after a monk laid to rest in the St. Martin's Abby in Olympia). That went on in various names and forms until 1993. Soon after, Keely became involved in a group called Nancyville, while Reece went on to play drums with Honeybucket and then queercore band Mukilteo Fairies (the name is a play on words, referencing the ferry boat that travels between Mukilteo and Clinton, Washington). Eventually, Keely and Reece moved to Austin, Texas. The two started playing as a duo under the moniker "You Will Know Us by the Trail of Dead." The band expanded eventually to include guitarist Kevin Allen and bassist Neil Busch. They then officially lengthened their name to "...And You Will Know Us by the Trail of Dead". Keely's girlfriend from Olympia, Deanne Rowley (later Deanne McAdams), briefly played with them as a live back-up guitarist.

According to the band's website, their name is taken from an ancient Mayan ritual chant which showed a similarity to an ancient Egyptian chant. They have also stated that this is a joke.

=== Rise and success (1995–2006) ===
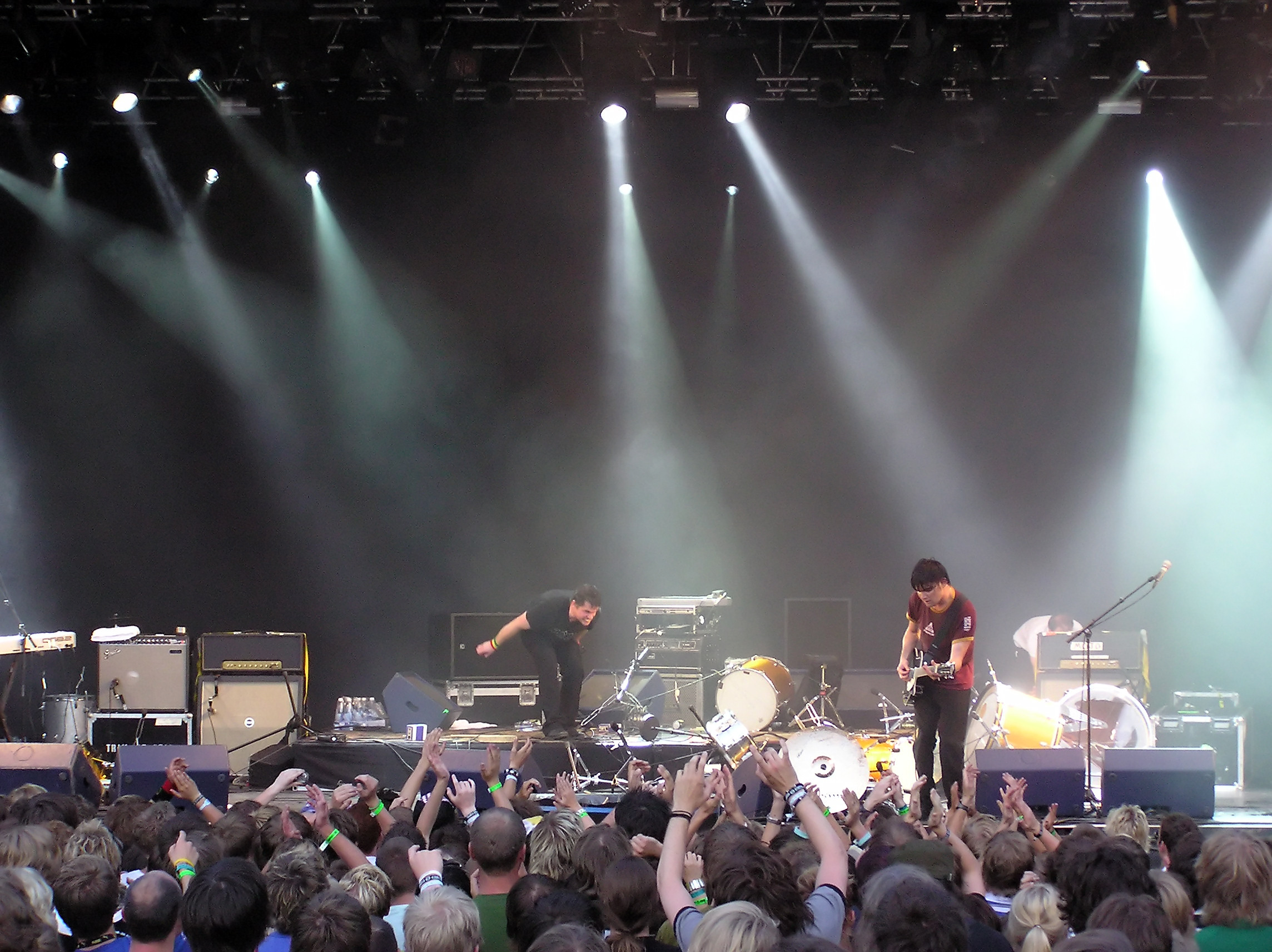
Reece trashing equipment in 2005

In 1995, Trail of Dead issued their first release, a song titled "Novena Without Faith" on a cassette-only compilation titled Austin Live Houses, followed by another self-titled four-song cassette on Golden Hour. In January 1998, they released a self-titled album on Trance Syndicate.

Trail of Dead soon joined Merge Records after the Trance Syndicate label folded. The band released Madonna on Merge in late 1999 and toured the U.S., opening for labelmates Superchunk to promote it. They signed to Interscope Records and released the Relative Ways EP in 2001.

In early 2002, Trail of Dead released Source Tags & Codes, which received wide acclaim, including a 10/10 rating from Pitchfork Media, later saying it is "one of indie rock's truly epic albums". Their following tour was chronicled by Rolling Stone, with Andrew Dansby commenting on their group dynamic as a "post-punk Voltron, that just might be the most exciting unit working today."

A follow-up EP to Source Tags & Codes was released in April 2003, titled The Secret of Elena's Tomb. The EP contained the electronic track "Intelligence" which featured and was co-written by Tyler Jacobson from A Roman Scandal, Reece's other band.

In July 2004, it was announced that Neil Busch had been removed from the band and Danny Wood would be taking his place on bass. Second drummer/percussionist Doni Schroader also joined the band around this time. Trail of Dead released Worlds Apart on January 25, 2005. Music videos were filmed for singles "And the Rest Will Follow" and "Caterwaul". The band also added live keyboardist David Longoria to their touring lineup. Now a six-piece, the band toured heavily on the album, with its trademark explosive live performances and a two-drummer attack. Opening for part of this tour was Longoria's band The Black, which featured Longoria on vocals and guitarist Alan Schaefer, with the rest of TOD filling out the group. The band's fifth album, So Divided, was released on November 14, 2006. Clay Morris replaced Longoria as live keyboardist, and eventually became a full-time member.

On April 26, 2005, their song "Will You Smile Again For Me" was featured at the conclusion of The Shield's 7th episode of their 4th season, "Hurt".

=== Post-Interscope era (2007–2023) ===
In late summer of 2007, Trail of Dead once again toured Europe, this time with drummer Aaron Ford replacing Doni Schroader. Danny Wood was absent from these performances, having quietly left the band. He would eventually be replaced by Jay Leo Phillips. The band provided the soundtrack to the 2007 film Hell on Wheels, a documentary about the formation of Roller Derby in Austin, Texas. After their overseas tour ended on March 15, 2007, Trail of Dead returned to the studio to begin recording their sixth record. In October, they supported the virtual band Dethklok on an Adult Swim college tour. In that same month, the band became independent after leaving Interscope Records due to a lack of support.

In early 2008, Trail of Dead went back into the studio without a record contract. Using their own capital, they filmed their recording experiences and released them on YouTube. On October 21, they released an EP, resembling an "album teaser", titled Festival Thyme on Richter Scale Records. On February 17, 2009, a 13-track album, The Century of Self was released. In September 2010, Keely posted news of an upcoming album 2011 release, produced by Chris "Frenchie" Smith, with an accompanying comic book. Smith is also set to re-mix their debut eponymous album. On November 10, 2010, the band announced that their seventh album, Tao of the Dead, would be released in North America on February 8, 2011. It was also revealed that the band had stripped down to a core four-piece, and that Jay Phillips, Clay Morris and longtime guitarist Kevin Allen had been removed from the lineup. Circumstances of these departures are currently unknown. Aaron Ford recorded all of the drums for Tao of the Dead, but then left the band. The band performed live on Late Night with Jimmy Fallon on February 7, 2011, debuting bassist Autry Fulbright II (from Reece side project Midnight Masses) and drummer/guitarist Jamie Miller, of the band theSTART. On February 17, 2011, it was announced that Reece would guest host Toby Ryan's radio show on Austin's KROX-FM (101X).

In 2012, the band recorded material for a new album in Hanover, Germany again with producer Frenchie Smith and engineer Mirko Hofmann. On August 22, the band announced their eighth studio album, Lost Songs, and released a song entitled "Up To Infinity", which was dedicated to Pussy Riot. Cover art was revealed on September 6, 2012. On September 25, they released "Catatonic" through Spotify.

In May 2013, the band announced a forthcoming EP, Tao of the Dead Part III, via Twitter. Using PledgeMusic, they began accepting pre-orders for special editions of the EP. In February 2014, the band announced a limited U.S. tour focused on playing music from Source Tags and Codes and plans to record their next album, a sequel to Tao of the Dead, in the spring and summer of 2014. In April 2014, they released the album Live at Rockpalast 2009. In August 2014, the band announced their ninth album, IX, using an online jigsaw puzzle. Pitchfork suggested "the arrival at a crossroads" for the band with the album. After a subsequent tour the band, Keely moved to Cambodia and released his debut solo album, Original Machines, in 2016. In November 2017, the band announced a European tour to celebrate the 20 year anniversary of the release of their second album, Madonna, performing the album in full.

On November 14, 2019, the band released "Don't Look Down", the first single from their tenth album, X: The Godless Void and Other Stories. The second single, "Into the Godless Void", was released on December 6, 2019.

In 2022 the band's latest album, XI: Bleed Here Now was released with quadraphonic mixing. After the band posted "Trail closed" on Instagram there were suspicions it might disband. The band still exists, although Keely stated that among various other issues, due to the hostile state of the music industry towards smaller bands, they could no longer afford to tour and that he had no desire to do it again. Despite this announcement, the band will be touring Australia in December 2025.

== Musical style and influences ==
...And You Will Know Us by the Trail of Dead have cited numerous bands and artists as influences, including Kate Bush, Mike Oldfield, Unwound, Karp, Sonic Youth, Pink Floyd, the Who, and Genesis.

== Personnel ==
Final line-up

- Conrad Keely – vocals, guitar (1994–present), piano, keyboards (2010–2020); drums (1994–2005, 2010–2011); bass (1994–1995)
- Jason Reece – drums, vocals, guitar (1994–present); bass (1994–1995)
- Alec Padron – bass (2019–present)
- Ben Redman – guitar, drums (2020–present)
- AJ Vincent – keyboards (2020–present)
- John Dowey – guitar (2022–present)

Former members

- Kevin Allen – guitar (1995–2010)
- Neil Busch – bass, vocals (1995–2005)
- Danny Wood – bass (2005–2007)
- Jay Leo Phillips – bass (2007–2010)
- Autry Fulbright II – bass, vocals (2010–2019)
- Doni Schroader – percussion, drums (2005–2007)
- Aaron Ford – percussion, drums (2007–2010)
- Jamie Miller – guitar, drums (2011–2020)
- David Longoria – keyboards (2005–2006)
- Clay Morris – keyboards (2006–2010)

== Discography ==
- ...And You Will Know Us by the Trail of Dead (1998)
- Madonna (1999)
- Source Tags & Codes (2002)
- Worlds Apart (2005)
- So Divided (2006)
- The Century of Self (2009)
- Tao of the Dead (2011)
- Lost Songs (2012)
- IX (2014)
- X: The Godless Void and Other Stories (2020)
- XI: Bleed Here Now (2022)
