= Jason Reece =

American drummer and vocalist

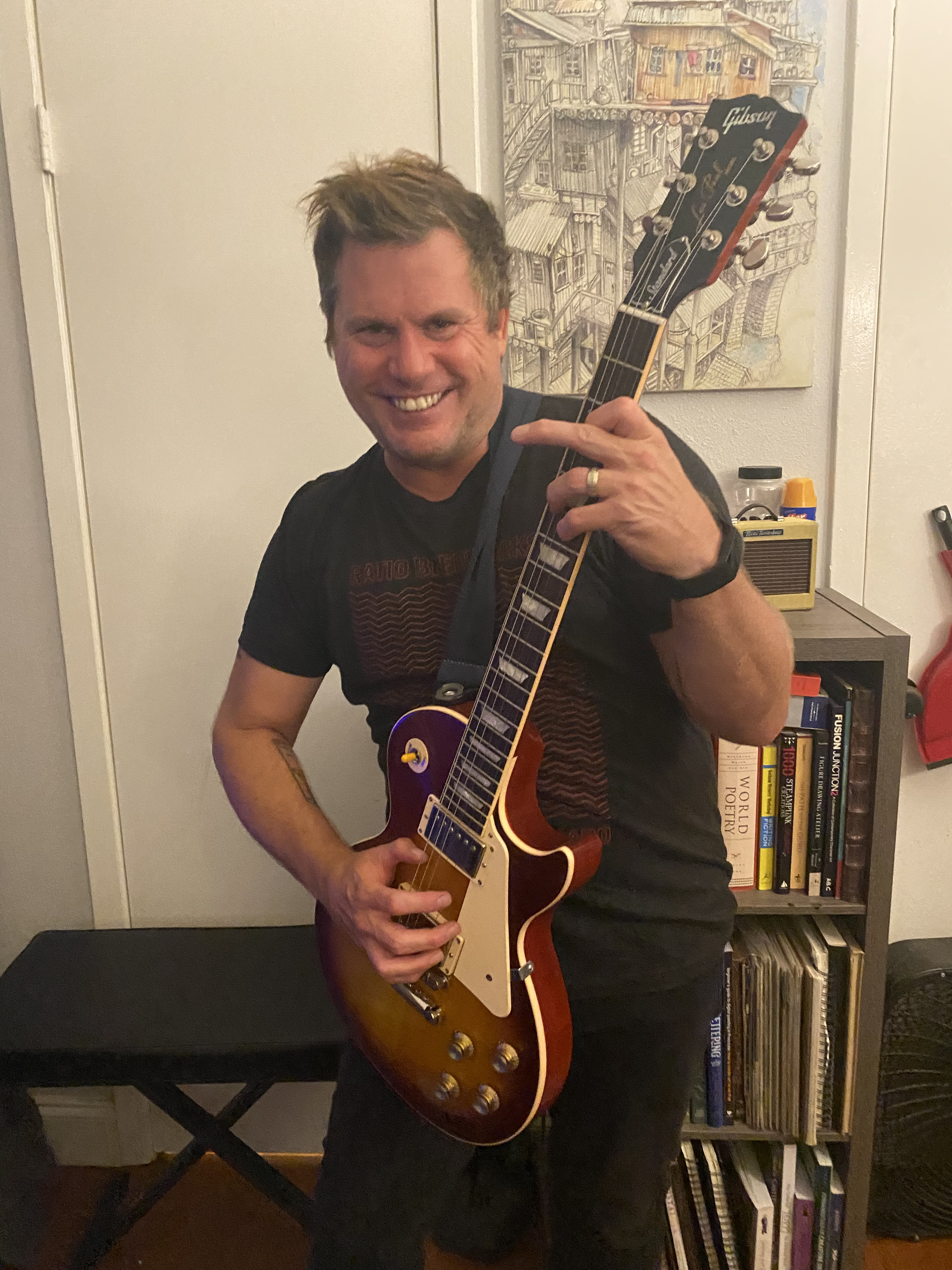

Background information
- Born: Jason Patrick Reece; July 13, 1971 (age 55); Huntington Beach, CA
- Instruments: Vocals, drums, guitar

Jason Reece (born July 13, 1971) is a member of Austin, Texas rock band ...And You Will Know Us by the Trail of Dead, pulling double duties as both drummer and part-time frontman.

== Biography ==
Reece was born in Huntington Beach, CA to Patrick and Kathleen Reece. At an early age, Reece's family moved him and his younger brother, Cole, to the rural outskirts of Hilo, Hawaii. As a teenager, Reece's family moved again from The Big Island to Oahu where he met Conrad Keely through a mutual friend, and they later both moved to Olympia, WA where Keely attended college. There they formed a band from which Reece was shortly fired. Reece then joined the band Honeybucket and, when that band broke up, Mukilteo Fairies. In 1994 Reece relocated to Austin. Keely joined him in moving, and they formed ...And You Will Know Us by the Trail of Dead, initially as a guitar-and-drums duo. Later other members joined, and in 2001, after two albums released on independent labels, the band was signed by Interscope. Reece continued to have side-projects, such as A Roman Scandal, and his solo work, A Flood of Red.
