= 2 YNFYNYTY =

Studio album by Cherubs
- Released: March 3, 2015
- Recorded: Summer 2014
- Genre: Noise rock, post-hardcore
- Length: 43:23
- Label: Brutal Panda Records
- Producer: Mike McCarthy

Cherubs chronology
Heroin Man (1994)	2 YNFYNYTY (2015)

Professional ratings
Review scores
Source	Rating
Punknews.org	3/5 stars
Ghost Cult Magazine	7.5/10 stars

2 YNFYNYTY is the third studio album by Texas noise rock band Cherubs, released through Brutal Panda Records on March 3, 2015 The album marks the band's first studio recording since their reunion in 2014, and it is the first release by the band since Short of Popular, a B-side collection the trio released in 1996, two years after their break-up. The record was released on digital, vinyl, and cassette tape formats, with the latter two initially being released in limited quantities.

== Background ==
The band first formed in 1991 with Kevin Whitley on guitar, Owen McMahon on bass, and Brant Pager on drums. In 1992, the trio were signed to Trance Syndicate and released two full-length albums, Icing and Heroin Man, before breaking up in 1994. An outtake collection, titled Short of Popular, was released in 1996. In 2014, the trio reunited and began to work on a new album with the intentions to release it by the end of the year. In December 2014, it was officially announced via the Brutal Panda Records YouTube page that the new album would be titled 2 YNFYNYTY, and will be released on March 3, 2015.

The album was released digitally through the band's official Bandcamp page, and physical editions were released in limited quantities. There were 500 vinyl copies pressed: 100 gold colored copies with a "white haze", 150 clear copies with gold splatters, and 250 standard black copies. A second pressing was made after the first 500 copies were sold out, 300 white copies with black splatters. The cassette edition was limited to 100 gold colored tapes.

== Track listing ==
No.	Title	Length
1.	"Sandy on the Beach"	3:13
2.	"Crashing the Ride"	1:25
3.	"Monkey Chow Mein"	6:14
4.	"Unhappyable"	4:05
5.	"Cumulo Nimbus"	6:52
6.	"We Buy Gold"	2:31
7.	"So Jellified"	4:52
8.	"Evil May Acre"	2:55
9.	"Party Ice"	6:46
10.	"Sunday Mondays"	4:30

== Personnel ==
- Kevin Whitley – guitar, vocals
- Owen McMahon – bass, vocals
- Brent Pager – drums
- Mike McCarthy – production
- Howie Weinberg – mastering
