= Brutal Panda Records =

American record label

Brutal Panda Records is an American record label founded in 2008 and based in Philadelphia, Pennsylvania. It focuses on high quality limited edition vinyl releases from metal bands and elaborate packaging.

== Artists and releases ==
- The Atlas Moth
  - An Ache for the Distance 12" Vinyl
- Black Tusk
  - "Fatal Kiss"/"Fire and Stone"/"Too Much Paranoias" Split 7" Vinyl with Fight Amp
- Cherubs
  - 2 YNFYNYTY 12" vinyl/cassette
- Dark Castle
  - Surrender to All Life Beyond Form 12" Vinyl
- Fight Amp
  - Manners and Praise 12" Vinyl
  - Hungry for Nothing 12" Vinyl
  - "Fatal Kiss"/"Fire and Stone"/"Too Much Paranoias" Split 7" Vinyl with Black Tusk
- Harkonen
  - Shake Harder Boy 12" Vinyl
- Horseback
  - "On The Eclipse" 7" Vinyl
- Javelina
  - Beasts Among Sheep 12" Vinyl
- Ladder Devils
  - Nowhere Plans 12" Vinyl
- Megasus
  - Menace of the Universe 5" Vinyl
- Millions
  - "Panic Program" 7" Vinyl
- Norska
  - S/T 12" Vinyl
- Primitive Weapons
  - The Shadow Gallery 12" Vinyl
- Ramming Speed
  - Brainwreck 12" Vinyl
- Shiner
  - Schadenfreude, cassette edition
- Whores
  - Ruiner 12" Vinyl
