= Sixteen Deluxe =

American alternative rock band

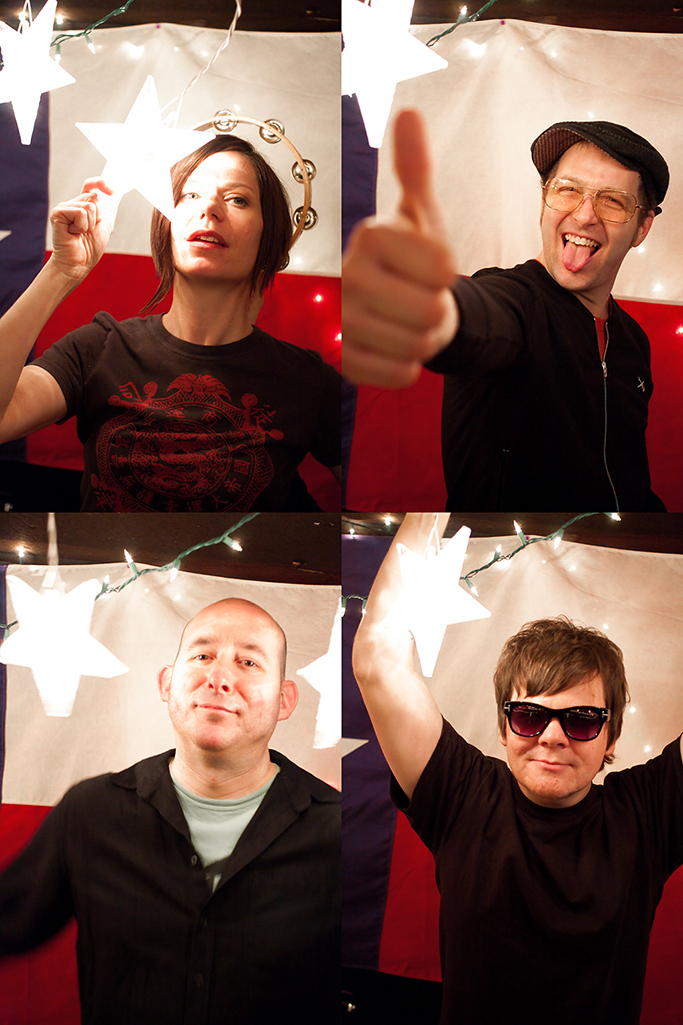
- Sixteen Deluxe in 2010

Background information
- Origin: Austin, Texas, U.S.
- Genres: Alternative rock
- Years active: 1994–2000, 2010–present
- Members: Carrie Clark; Chris "Frenchie" Smith; Jeff Copas; Steven T. Hall
- Past members: J. Bryan Bowden; Lyman Hardy III; Casey Rhodes

Sixteen Deluxe is an American alternative rock band from Austin, Texas, United States. They were mainly active in the 1990s, recording initially for Butthole Surfers drummer King Coffey's Trance Syndicate label. They issued one album on Warner Bros. Records and several others on indie labels. Sixteen Deluxe disbanded in 2000, and re-formed in 2010. In 2012, Sixteen Deluxe were inducted into the Austin Chronicle 's Austin Music Hall of Fame.

== History ==
Sixteen Deluxe formed in 1994 after the demise of Swingset, a band that featured vocalist/guitarist Carrie Clark, bass player Owen McMahon (Cherubs, Butthole Surfers), and drummer John Paul Keenon (Sean Lennon). Clark auditioned for the Austin band Flying Saucers, and was turned down, but informed by Flying Saucer front man Jon Sanchez that another guitarist who had tried out and also been rejected, Chris "Frenchie" Smith, might be a good match for her. Enlisting bass player Jeff Copas and drummer Lyman Hardy (Ed Hall), Sixteen Deluxe began rehearsing in the spring of 1994.

After writing and playing throughout the summer of 1994, Sixteen Deluxe were asked by King Coffey (Butthole Surfers) to record a 7" single for his Trance Syndicate label. Released in February 1995, the "Idea" single (b/w "Honey") would be named one of the Top Ten singles of 1995 by Spin Magazine's Charles Aaron. The single and accompanying video were placed into rotation on MTV's "120 Minutes". Coffey next offered the band the opportunity to record a full-length album, and the band entered Music Lane Studios in Austin in late December 1994 to track the album. Due to his ongoing Ed Hall commitments, Hardy was replaced by J Bryan Bowden in the fall of 1994. Bowden played drums on the band's debut record, Backfeedmagnetbabe.

Released in May 1995 by Trance Syndicate and distributed by Touch and Go Records, Backfeedmagnetbabe was met with positive critical acclaim and brought the band to the attention of major labels. Touring throughout 1995 and 1996 (with drummer Casey Rhodes), the band played shows and toured with Medicine, Guided By Voices, Pansy Division, and Ed Hall. In March 1996, Sixteen Deluxe toured the United States opening for 7 Year Bitch. In spring 1996, the band recorded Pilot Knob EP with the members of Crust, with Hardy returning to the drum seat again after the departure of Rhodes prior to the recording.

In October 1996, Sixteen Deluxe signed a two-record deal with Warner Bros. Records. The band recorded their Warner's debut at Hyde Street Studios in San Francisco during January and February 1997 with producer John Croslin, engineer Dave McNair, and new drummer Steven T. Hall. During the fall of 1997, Sixteen Deluxe toured extensively as the opening act for Luna on their Pup Tent tour. Their Warners debut, Emits Showers of Sparks, was released in January 1998. During the summer of 1998, Sixteen Deluxe toured as the opening act for Jesus & Mary Chain, and played several shows with Swervedriver and Hum. During 1998 the band also recorded an EP, The Moonman is Blue, with producer Mike McCarthy.

Sixteen Deluxe asked to be released from their Warner Bros. contract in November 1998, and after receiving a settlement from the label built their home studio, The Bubble. Over the next year, the band recorded with McCarthy and others, and opened up The Bubble to other Austin bands. Touring continued throughout 1999 with recording taking place in between. In November 1999 while on tour, Copas quit the band in Lawrence, Kansas, and drummer Steven T. Hall replaced him on bass, with Kliph Scurlock (Flaming Lips) taking over drums. In June 2000, the resulting album Vision Take Me, Make Me, Never Forsake Me was released by L.A.-based Sugarfix Records, and that same month Clark quit the band. Sixteen Deluxe then announced their break up.

== Reunion ==
In March 2010, Sixteen Deluxe reunited to play a benefit for Austin's SIMS Foundation, a drug and alcohol rehabilitation charity. A series of shows during South by Southwest followed, and the band continued to perform throughout the year.

In March 2012, Sixteen Deluxe were inducted into the Austin Music Hall of Fame by readers of the Austin Chronicle. In September 2012, they performed at Grulkefest, a benefit for the late Brent Grulke, Creative Director of SXSW, along with Austin bands True Believers, The Reivers, and Fastball. The band also performed in September 2012 at the 5th Annual Dia De Los Toadies festival in New Braunfels, TX with Toadies, Helmet, and Mariachi El Bronx.

In a podcast interview conducted with Alex Botten in November 2013, Sixteen Deluxe announced that they were writing new material and recording. In July 2014, the band recorded new material at The Bubble in Austin, TX, with guitarist Smith producing.

On March 29, 2015, Good Records of Dallas, Texas, announced the release of a 7" of newly recorded Sixteen Deluxe material, to be released on Record Store Day, April 18, 2015. The 7" marked the first release of new Sixteen Deluxe material since their 2000 breakup.

== Band members ==
=== Current ===
- Carrie Clark – vocals, guitar (1994–present)
- Jeff Copas – bass (1994–present)
- Steven T. Hall – drums (1996–present)
- Chris "Frenchie" Smith – vocals, guitar (1994–present)

=== Past ===
- J. Bryan Bowden – drums (1994–1995)
- Lyman Hardy III – drums (1994, 1996)
- Casey Rhodes – drums (1995–1996)

== Discography ==
Albums

Year	Album	Label
1995	Backfeedmagnetbabe	Trance Syndicate (CD/LP TR37)
1998	Emits Showers of Sparks	Warner Bros. Records (CD/LP 46657)
2000	Vision Take Me, Make Me, Never Forsake Me	Sugar Fix/Figure 8 (CD0013)

EPs

Year	EP	Label
1997	Pilot Knob	Genius Records (geniCD024)
1997	Easy With the Sideways	Warner Bros. Records (PRO-CD-9110)
1999	The Moonman is Blue	Sugar Fix/Figure 8 (CD0011)

Singles

Year	Songs	Label
1995	"Idea" b/w "Honey"	Trance Syndicate (TR32)
1996	"Reactive" b/w "Kids in America"	Propeller Records (7-002)
1997	"Purple" b/w "Burning Leaves" and "Lee Harvey"	Warner Bros. Records
1998	"Purple (Clean Radio Edit)" b/w "Purple (Clean Album Version)"	Warner Bros. Records (PRO-CD-9302-R)
2000	"To Find What's Waitin' For" b/w "Burning Leaves (demo)"	Speakerphone Recordings (DIAL 006)
2015	"Hit It" b/w "Dexfield Park"	Good Records Recordings/Frenchie Smith Records/Classic Waxxx Records

Compilations

Year	Title	Song	Label
1995	Cinco Anos	"Giver", "Daisy Haze"	Trance Syndicate (TR38)
1995	101XMas	"Away in a Manger"	101X
1998	A Day in the Life	"Vicious"	SIMS Foundation

== Television and film ==
Year	TV/Film Title	Song
1996	Normal Life	"Fetus"
1997	The Maker	"Reactive"
1997-98	Austin Stories (TV Series)	"Shanesong" (opening credits)
