= Salsa (EP) =

EP by Residual Kid
- Released: April 8, 2016
- Recorded: 2015–2016, The Bubble, Austin, Texas
- Genre: Alternative rock
- Length: 16:01
- Producer: Chris "Frenchie" Smith

Residual Kid chronology
Faces (2012)	''Salsa'' (2016)	The Volcom Sessions (2016)

Salsa is an EP by American alternative rock band Residual Kid, released on April 8, 2016. It was produced by Chris "Frenchie" Smith. To celebrate the release, the band held an EP release show at The Hi-Dive in Denver, Colorado. The song "Scentless Princess" was released as the lead single from the EP, with a video directed by Joshua Logan and Michael Anthony Gibson. A second music video was released later on for the song "Chill".

== Track listing ==
No.	Title	Length
1.	"Scentless Princess"	4:19
2.	"ICSTW"	3:58
3.	"Chill"	3:58
4.	"Salsa"	3:49
Total length:		16:01

== Personnel ==
Residual Kid

- Deven Ivy – vocals, guitar
- Ben Redman – drums
- Max Redman – bass guitar

Production

- Produced by Chris "Frenchie" Smith
- Recorded by Sean Rolie
- Mixed by Chris "Frenchie" Smith and Sean Rolie
- Mastered by Alex Lyon
