= Slug (American band) =

- Origin: Los Angeles, California
- Genres: Noise rock, post-hardcore
- Years active: 1988–1996
- Labels: Magnatone, Sympathy for the Record Industry, PCP/Matador
- Past members: Stephen Karl Ratter; Damian Romero; Tomás Palermo; Todd Williams; Collin Rae; David Scott Stone; Michael B Rich Alvarez
- Website: slugla.com

Slug was an American noise rock group that formed in Los Angeles in 1988 by DJs from Loyola Marymount University campus radio station KXLU. Originally formed as an experimental noise collage trio utilizing metal percussion, feedback and primitive sound loops created via gouged children's and sound effect records, they subsequently added traditional instrumentation (two basses, two guitars, drums, vocals) to the mix.

Slug self-released their first single on their own label Magnatone Recordings. After the release of their first album Swingers, guitarist Rich Alvarez left to pursue his own band Jackknife, and was replaced by Collin Rae, formerly of 4AD artist Ultra Vivid Scene.

Before the recording of their third album The 3 Man Themes, bassist Michael B.© left to be replaced by David Scott Stone.

Slug disbanded in 1996. Stone would go on to work with the Melvins, LCD Soundsystem and other groups. Bassist Damian Romero continued his side noise/ambient project under the name Speculum Fight. Guitarist Todd Williams relocated to New York City to work as a film editor. Drummer Tomás Palermo moved to the San Francisco Bay area as a freelance writer on reggae for URB magazine and other publications. Guitarist Collin Rae moved to the Bay Area as well, performing in other groups as well as continuing his work as a professional photographer.

== Members ==
- Stephen Karl Ratter (vocals/percussion/keyboards)
- Damian Romero (bass)
- Tomás Palermo (drums/percussion)
- Todd Williams (guitar)
- Collin Rae (guitar, 1992–1996)
- David Scott Stone (bass) (1993–1996)
- Michael B (bass, 1989–1993)
- Rich Alvarez (guitar, 1989–1992)

== Discography ==
=== Albums ===
Swingers CD (Piece of Mind Records, 1993)

1. "Messerschmidt" (with Robert Hammer)
2. "Face Down"
3. "Four By Four"
4. "Lockjaw"
5. "Go Tell (version)"
6. "Hail America!"
7. "Trafalgar Square"
8. "Swingers"
9. "Sore Thumb"
10. "Painbaby"
11. "Freak of Nature"
12. "Aversion"
13. "Elevator"
14. "Breakneck"

The Out Sound (PCP Entertainment/Matador, 1994)

1. "Ex-Chest"
2. "Telephone Trouble"
3. "Aurora F."
4. "Here and Now" (with Thomas A. Grimley)
5. "Crawl" (CD only)
6. "Sung-il Meat"
7. "King of Ghosts" (version)
8. "Symbol for Snack"
9. "Lofthouse" (with Alicia J. Rose)
10. "Coordinate Points" (with CRIB)
11. "Kitty Thai Spicy"

The 3 Man Themes (PCP Entertainment/Matador, 1996)

1. "Unesque"
2. "The Gentle Man"
3. "Madison Man"
4. "Kayamba Dance"
5. "El Paraiso"
6. "The Distinct Room"
7. "Resonance Man" (with Rachel Haden)
8. "The Grey Man"
9. "Oh Yeah!" (Can cover)
10. "Silver Man"

=== 10" EPs ===
Swingers (Magnatone Recordings, 1992)

1. "Messerschmidt" (with Robert Hammer)
2. "Face Down"
3. "Four By Four"
4. "Lockjaw"
5. "Go Tell (version)"
6. "Hail America!"
7. "Trafalgar Square"
8. "Swingers"

=== Singles ===
- "Sore Thumb"/"Painbaby"/"Freak of Nature"/"Aversion" (Magnatone Recordings, 1991)
- "Breathe The Thing Out"/"Breakneck"/"Go Tell" (Sympathy for the Record Industry, 1992)
- "Streetsweeper" split 7-inch with Unsane (PCP Entertainment, 1992)
- "Godstopper" (tour-only single, Star Fuck Records, 1992)
- "Hambone City"/"King of Ghosts" (Sympathy for the Record Industry, 1993)
- "Seitenwagen"/"Rubberape" (PCP Entertainment, 1993)
- "Pink Party Dessert" split 7-inch with Cherubs (No Lie Music, 1993)
- "Crawl" 8" flexidisc (PCP Entertainment, 1994)

=== Compilation appearances ===
- Hurt: A Psychotechnics Compilation "Elevator" (Braindrops Records, 1991)
- Jabberjaw: Good to the Last Drop "Borax" (Caroline Records, 1994)
- Smitten: A Love Song Compilation "Choker" (Karate Records, 1994)
- Star Fuck Presents Tour Singles "Godstopper" (Star Fuck Records, 1994)
- Notes from the Underground "Sung-il Meat" (Priority Records, 1995)
- PCP Generics "Aurora F." (PCP Entertainment, 1995)
- The Poop Alley Tapes: A Compilation of 31 Los Angeles Bands "Silver Man" (WIN Records, 1995)
