= Case Histories (album) =

Pain Teens

Studio album by Pain Teens
- Released: July 1989
- Recorded: 1989
- Genre: Noise rock
- Length: 40:08
- Label: Anomie
- Producer: Scott Ayers

Pain Teens chronology
Pain Teens (1988)	Pain Teens (1989)	Born in Blood (1990)

Professional ratings
Review scores
Source	Rating
AllMusic	4/5 stars

Case Histories is the debut studio album of American noise rock and Industrial music band Pain Teens, released in July 1989 by Anomie Records.

== Track listing ==
All lyrics are written by Bliss Blood; all music is composed by Scott Ayers.

Side one
No.	Title	Length
1.	"Hands in Fire"	2:21
2.	"Bannoy"	5:03
3.	"Veil of Light"	3:52
4.	"Puzzling Diagnosis"	6:27
5.	"Wot's De Matter"	1:51

Side two
No.	Title	Length
1.	"Preppy Killer"	3:52
2.	"Unthinkable"	4:19
3.	"Path of Destruction"	3:28
4.	"New Woman"	3:25
5.	"Bug in a Can"	5:25

== Personnel ==
Adapted from the Case Histories liner notes.

Pain Teens

- Scott Ayers – guitar, bass guitar, electronics, production, engineering
- Bliss Blood – lead vocals

Additional musicians and production

- Austin Caustic – tape (B2)
- David Parker – drums (A2, B1)
- Frank Kozik – cover art

== Release history ==
Region	Date	Label	Format	Catalog
United States	1989	Anomie	CS, LP	003
