= Faces (EP) =

Studio album by Residual Kid
- Released: October 9, 2012
- Recorded: 2012, The Bubble, Austin, Texas
- Genre: Alternative rock
- Length: 21:11
- Producer: Chris "Frenchie" Smith

Residual Kid chronology
Box (2011)	''Faces'' (2012)	Salsa (2016)

Faces is an EP by American alternative rock band Residual Kid, which was released in October 2012. It was produced by Chris "Frenchie" Smith.

== Track listing ==
No.	Title	Length
1.	"Faces"	2:33
2.	"Friend"	3:37
3.	"Purple Shoes"	3:32
4.	"Pulling Through"	3:11
5.	"Lab Rat"	3:33
6.	"Lost Cause"	4:46
Total length:		21:11

== Personnel ==
Residual Kid

- Deven Ivy – vocals, guitar
- Ben Redman – drums
- Max Redman – bass guitar

Production

- Produced by Chris "Frenchie" Smith
- Recorded by Sean Rolie and mixed by Chris "Frenchie" Smith at The Bubble in Austin, Texas
- Mastered by Jerry Tubb at Terra Nova Digital Audio, Inc. in Austin, Texas
- Cody Schibi – artwork
- Glen Brown – disc image
