= Drain (noise rock band) =

American noise rock band

- Origin: Austin, Texas, U.S.
- Genres: Noise rock, psychedelic rock
- Years active: 1992–1997
- Labels: Trance Syndicate
- Past members: King Coffey; David McCreath; Owen McMahon

Drain were an American noise rock band formed in Austin, Texas by King Coffey in 1991. The group also included David McCreath on guitar and bassist Owen McMahon of Cherubs. Along with the psychedelic leanings of Coffey's other band the Butthole Surfers, Drain also ventures into electronic and techno music territory. Also, samplers and drum machines play a stronger role in the music.

== Discography ==
- "A Black Fist" b/w "Flower Mound" (1991)
- Pick Up Heaven (1992)
- Offspeed and In There (1996)
