= Beast of Dreams =

Studio album by Pain Teens
- Released: October 24, 1995
- Genre: Noise rock
- Length: 45:44
- Label: Trance Syndicate
- Producer: Scott Ayers

Pain Teens chronology
Destroy Me, Lover (1993)	Beast of Dreams (1995)

Beast of Dreams is the fifth and final studio album by American noise rock and Industrial music band Pain Teens, released on October 24, 1995 by Trance Syndicate.

== Music ==
Ayers has described the music on Destroy Me, Lover as being more eccentric than the band's previous releases, attributing the inclusion of instruments such as a sitar, violin, and upright bass as contributing to the record's diverse sound.

== Reception ==
Professional ratings
Review scores
Source	Rating
AllMusic	3/5 stars

Vincent Jeffries of AllMusic complimented Ayers's musicianship but criticized the record for becoming "synthetic and repetitive."

== Track listing ==
All lyrics are written by Bliss Blood, except where noted; all music is composed by Scott Ayers, except where noted.

No.	Title	Writer(s)	Length
1.	"Swimming"		2:54
2.	"Manouche"		3:22
3.	"Coral Kiss"		3:56
4.	"Accusing Eyes"		3:03
5.	"Swamp"		4:25
6.	"Embers and Ashes"		3:56
7.	"Voluptus"		4:41
8.	"Moonray"	Paul Madison, Arthur Quenzer, Artie Shaw	3:31
9.	"Frigid Idol"		4:07
10.	"Skids"		3:03
11.	"The Sweet Sickness"		3:24
12.	"Invitation"	Bronisław Kaper	5:16

== Personnel ==
Adapted from the Beast of Dreams liner notes.

Pain Teens

- Scott Ayers – guitar, bass guitar, drums, violin, sitar, sampler, electronics, tape, production, engineering
- Bliss Blood – lead vocals

Production and additional personnel

- Nikki Lewis – photography
- Pain Teens – recording
- Tim Thompson – design

== Release history ==
Region	Date	Label	Format	Catalog
United States	1995	Trance Syndicate	CD, CS, LP	TR-41
