= Stimulation Festival =

Studio album by Pain Teens
- Released: 1992
- Genre: Noise rock
- Length: 55:16
- Label: Trance Syndicate
- Producer: Scott Ayers

Pain Teens chronology
Born in Blood (1990)	Stimulation Festival (1992)	Destroy Me, Lover (1993)

Stimulation Festival is a studio album by American band Pain Teens, released in 1992 by Trance Syndicate. "Wild World" is a cover of the Birthday Party song.

== Reception ==
Professional ratings
Review scores
Source	Rating
AllMusic	3.5/5 stars
Chicago Tribune	2.5/4 stars

The Chicago Tribune deemed the album "a 14-track dread- and chaos-permeated industrial slugfest, built around singer Bliss Blood's drained, spoken-word ramblings and Scott Ayers' guitar hash and mechanistic studio manipulations." The Dallas Morning News praised the "inventive guitar and samples [and] Ms. Blood's sassy singing."

Jason Anderson of AllMusic called the album "a fine first purchase for new fans, as it is nothing if not representative of Pain Teens' sonic assault."

== Track listing ==
All lyrics are written by Bliss Blood; all music is composed by Pain Teens, except "Wild World" by Nick Cave and Mick Harvey.

No.	Title	Length
1.	"Shallow Hole"	4:25
2.	"The Dead Cannot"	5:15
3.	"God Told Me"	3:32
4.	"The Poured Out Blood"	4:35
5.	"Drowning"	2:36
6.	"Living Hell"	3:16
7.	"Indiscreet Jewels"	3:56
8.	"Wild World" (Birthday Party cover)	5:54
9.	"Daughter of Chaos"	3:41
10.	"Evil Dirt"	3:30
11.	"Bruised"	2:59
12.	"Dog Spirits"	4:04
13.	"Hangman's Rope"	4:00
14.	"Apartment #213"	3:28

== Personnel ==
Adapted from the Stimulation Festival liner notes.

Pain Teens

- Scott Ayers – guitar, drums, electronics, tape, production, engineering
- Bliss Blood – lead vocals, cover art
- Kirk Carr – bass guitar
- Frank Garymartin – drums
- David Parker – drums

== Release history ==
Region	Date	Label	Format	Catalog
United States	1992	Trance Syndicate	CD, CS, LP	TR-10
