= Scott Ayers =

American musician

- Born: United States
- Genres: Noise rock
- Occupation: Musician
- Instruments: guitar, keyboard
- Years active: 1985–present
- Labels: Anomie, Charnel Music, Trance Syndicate
- Formerly of: Pain Teens

Scott Ayers is an American musician, best known as the guitarist and keyboardist for the noise rock band Pain Teens based in Houston, Texas. He has also released solo albums under the moniker Walking Timebombs and is involved with bands local to Texas, including Anarchitex, Exterminating Angels and Geltab.

== History ==
Scott Ayers began playing guitar at the age of thirteen. He was initially inspired after hearing Are You Experienced by The Jimi Hendrix Experience and later became interested in the compositions and musicianship of Robert Fripp and Brian Eno. As an adult, he studied anthropology at the University of Houston. After Pain Teens disbanded in 1995, Ayers began issuing music under the name Walking Timebombs. In 1997 he released Walking Timebombs, which captured a live performance of Ayers accompanied by former Pain Teens' drummer Frank Garymartin.

== Discography ==
=== Pain Teens ===
- Pain Teens (1988, Anomie)
- Case Histories (1989, Anomie)
- Born in Blood (1990, Trance Syndicate)
- Stimulation Festival (1992, Trance Syndicate)
- Destroy Me, Lover (1993, Trance Syndicate)
- Beast of Dreams (1995, Trance Syndicate)

=== Walking Timebombs ===
- Walking Timebombs (1997, Charnel Music)
- with Tribes of Neurot: Static Migration (1998, Release Entertainment)
- with SubArachnoid Space:The Sleeping Sickness (1999, Elsie & Jack)
- Sapsucker (2001, Anomie)
