= The Darkest Hour Is Just Before Dawn =

Studio album by The Birdwatcher
- Released: November 7, 2000
- Recorded: The Hope Union and J. Teels Funhouse in New York City
- Genre: Post-rock, folk
- Length: 44:44
- Label: Arena Rock
- Producer: Dan Matz

The Birdwatcher chronology
The Darkest Hour Is Just Before Dawn (2000)	Afternoon Tales the Morning Never Knew (2002)

Professional ratings
Review scores
Source	Rating
AllMusic	4/5 stars

The Darkest Hour Is Just Before Dawn is the first album by The Birdwatcher, released in 2000. The alias used by Dan Matz, frontman of Windsor for the Derby.

== Track listing ==
1. "Cutting Rope" – 2:51
2. "First Bright Light" – 10:23
3. "Bound to Collide" – 5:54
4. "Dawn" – 10:20
5. "Little Birdy" – 1:32
6. "The Hunt" – 4:41
7. "Three Weeks" – 3:20
8. "No Expectations" (The Rolling Stones cover) – 5:43
