= Destroy Me, Lover =

Studio album by Pain Teens
- Released: July 5, 1993
- Recorded: Anomie, Houston, TX
- Genre: Noise rock
- Length: 41:38
- Label: Trance Syndicate
- Producer: Scott Ayers

Pain Teens chronology
Stimulation Festival (1992)	Destroy Me, Lover (1993)	Beast of Dreams (1995)

Destroy Me, Lover is the fourth studio album by American noise rock and Industrial music band Pain Teens, released on July 5, 1993, by Trance Syndicate.

== Reception ==
Professional ratings
Review scores
Source	Rating
AllMusic	2/5 stars

Jason Ankeny of AllMusic expressed his dislike for Scott Ayers' compositional style and called Bliss Blood's contributions "negligible at best".

The album cover features an image appropriated from the first edition of William S. Burroughs's novel Junkie, published by Ace Books.

== Track listing ==
All tracks are written by Scott Ayers and Bliss Blood except "The Story of Isaac" by Leonard Cohen.

No.	Title	Length
1.	"Cool Your Power"	2:38
2.	"Prowling"	3:04
3.	"Tar Pit"	3:50
4.	"RU 486"	3:35
5.	"Dominant Man"	4:14
6.	"Sexual Anorexia"	3:17
7.	"Lisa Knew"	4:09
8.	"Body Memory"	6:25
9.	"The Story of Isaac" (Leonard Cohen cover)	5:00
10.	"Shock Treatment"	5:38

== Personnel ==
Adapted from the Destroy Me, Lover liner notes.

Pain Teens

- Scott Ayers – guitar, drums, sampler, electronics, tape, production, engineering, recording
- Bliss Blood – lead vocals, percussion
- Kirk Carr – bass guitar
- Frank Garymartin – drums, percussion

== Release history ==
Region	Date	Label	Format	Catalog
United States	1993	Trance Syndicate	CD, CS, LP	TR-17
