= Pain Teens (album) =

Compilation album by Pain Teens
- Released: 1988
- Recorded: 1986 – 1987
- Genre: Noise rock, experimental rock
- Length: 43:32
- Label: Anomie
- Producer: Scott Ayers

Pain Teens chronology
Pain Teens (1988)	Case Histories (1989)

Pain Teens is compilation album the American noise rock and Industrial music band Pain Teens, released in 1988 by Anomie Records. It comprises music previously released by the band in cassette format, including songs from Manmade Disasters, Cathy and IV. It was later reissued, remixed, and remastered on CD and released on Charnel Music in 1998.

== Reception ==
Professional ratings
Review scores
Source	Rating
AllMusic	4/5 stars

Tom Schulte of AllMusic called the record "an important work of experimental guitar, sound manipulations and proto-industrial musical ethic."

== Track listing ==
All lyrics are written by Bliss Blood; all music is composed by Scott Ayers.

Side one
No.	Title	From album (date)	Length
1.	"Inside Me"	IV (1987)	3:45
2.	"The Unnamable"	Cathy (1987)	3:11
3.	"Brown Jenkin"	Cathy (1987)	5:04
4.	"A Knife"	Manmade Disasters (1987)	4:39
5.	"The Shoemaker"	Cathy (1987)	3:32
6.	"Amidst the Rubble"	Manmade Disasters (1987)	2:26

Side two
No.	Title	From album (date)	Length
1.	"A World of Destruction"	IV (1987)	2:49
2.	"Valley of the Sun"	Cathy (1987)	1:50
3.	"Symptoms"	Cathy (1987)	3:01
4.	"The Poor Doubt Blood"	Cathy (1987)	3:27
5.	"Where Madness Dwells"	Cathy (1987)	2:16
6.	"A Continuing Nightmare"	IV (1987)	3:35
7.	"Count Magnus"	Cathy (1987)	5:53

CD track listing
No.	Title	From album (date)	Length
1.	"Inside Me"	IV (1987)	3:45
2.	"The Unnamable"	Cathy (1987)	3:11
3.	"Brown Jenkin"	Cathy (1987)	5:04
4.	"A Knife"	Manmade Disasters (1987)	4:39
5.	"The Shoemaker"	Cathy (1987)	3:32
6.	"Amidst the Rubble"	Manmade Disasters (1987)	2:26
7.	"World of Destruction"	IV (1987)	2:49
8.	"Valley of the Sun"	Cathy (1987)	1:50
9.	"Symptoms"	Cathy (1987)	3:01
10.	"Where Madness Dwells"	Cathy (1987)	2:16
11.	"A Continuing Nightmare"	IV (1987)	3:35
12.	"Count Magnus"	Cathy (1987)	5:53
13.	"Tapes"	Manmade Disasters (1987)	2:24
14.	"Innsmouth"	Psychoactive (1986)	3:28
15.	"The Freezingwind"	Previously unreleased	2:49
16.	"Somnambulist"	Previously unreleased	3:42
17.	"Untitled"	Previously unreleased	1:13

== Personnel ==
Adapted from the Pain Teens liner notes.

Pain Teens

- Scott Ayers – guitar, drums, recording, production
- Bliss Blood – lead vocals

== Release history ==
Region	Date	Label	Format	Catalog
United States	1988	Anomie	LP	001
United States	1998	Charnel Music	CD	CHCD-32
