= Born in Blood =

Studio album by Pain Teens
- Released: November 1990
- Genre: Noise rock
- Length: 37:01
- Label: Trance Syndicate
- Producer: Scott Ayers

Pain Teens chronology
Case Histories (1989)	Born in Blood (1990)	Stimulation Festival (1992)

Born in Blood is a studio album by American noise rock and Industrial music band Pain Teens, released in 1990. It was their first album for the Trance Syndicate label.

== Reception ==
Professional ratings
Review scores
Source	Rating
AllMusic	4/5 stars
The Encyclopedia of Popular Music	3/5 stars

Kathleen C. Fennessy of AllMusic wrote that "the Teens have a firm grasp on song structure and Bliss Blood's vocals are always pleasing." The Chicago Reader wrote that when the band "fired on all cylinders—combining filthy guitar fuzz, junkyard industrial beats, sinister psychedelic fuckery, and icy, sneering vocals—they transcended their adolescent fixation on depravity and evil."

== Track listing ==
All lyrics are written by Bliss Blood, except where noted; all music is composed by Scott Ayers, except where noted.

Side one
No.	Title	Writer(s)	Length
1.	"The Basement"		3:29
2.	"Pleasures of the Flesh"		4:09
3.	"Shotguns"		2:45
4.	"Bad in My Head"		2:58
5.	"The Way Love Used to Be" (Kinks cover)	Ray Davies	2:22
6.	"Secret Is Sickness"		2:43

Side two
No.	Title	Writer(s)	Length
1.	"Lady of Flame"		3:24
2.	"Desu Evol Yaw" (Kinks cover)	Ray Davies	2:23
3.	"She Shook Me" (David Bowie cover)	David Bowie	3:47
4.	"Christo"		1:16
5.	"My Desire"		3:12
6.	"Noh Jam"		4:30

== Personnel ==
Adapted from the Born in Blood liner notes.

Pain Teens

- Scott Ayers – guitar, bass guitar, drums, violin, electronics, tape, production, engineering
- Bliss Blood – lead vocals
- Steve Cook – bass guitar
- David Parker – drums

Additional musicians and production

- Ralf Armin – guitar (A2, B3, B5)
- Pain Teens – recording
- Dan Workman – mixing

== Release history ==
Region	Date	Label	Format	Catalog
United States	1990	Trance Syndicate	CD, LP	TR-03
