= Always the Alibi =

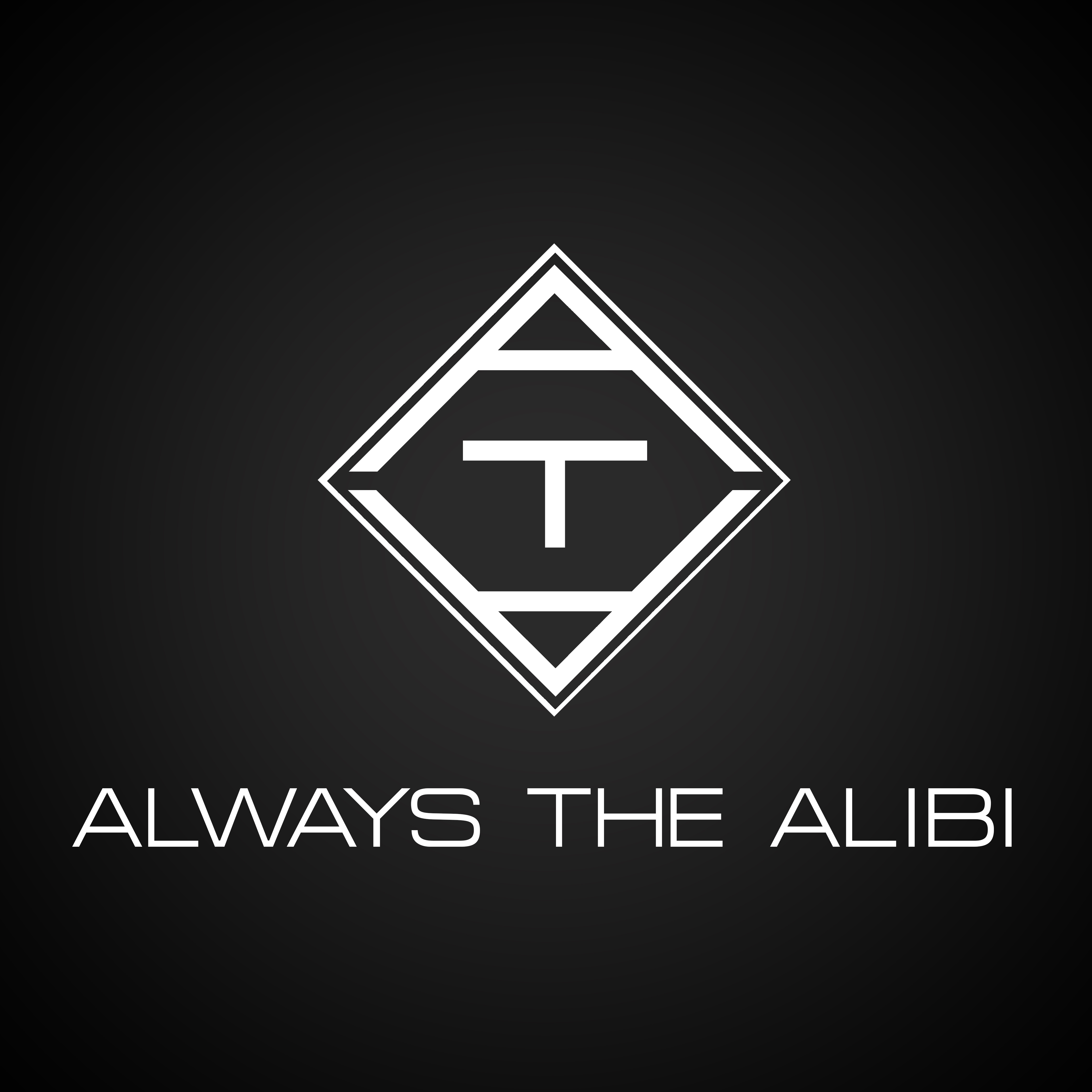
ATA Logo

Always the Alibi (ATA) is an indie rock band based out of the Dallas–Fort Worth metroplex. Always the Alibi ranked #1 on Reverb Nation's Dallas Alternative chart in 2012 with EP "We Are Waiting". The band went on a hiatus in 2013 due to lead singer Henry Coke's battle with brain cancer.

Always the Alibi returned in 2016, attempting to regain its earlier success. In recognition of Coke's time spent battling cancer, the band named their next release, “Reprieve,” along with the cover depicting his radiation mask. Coupled with Grammy-nominated producer Chris “Frenchie” Smith, the release was featured on radio stations in the Dallas–Fort Worth metroplex, such as 97.1 The Eagle.

== Discography ==
=== Studio albums ===
- We Are Waiting (2012)
- Reprieve (2016)

=== Studio singles ===
- Beautiful Girl (2012)
- Turning the Pages (2012)
- We Are Waiting (2012)
- After All I've Done (2016)
- Ain't Another Girl (2017)
- My Little Ghost (2017)
- Off the Grid (2019)
- Running in Circles (2019)
- Remember This (2020)
- Mackenzie (2020)
- This Scar from You (2021)
- Killing Me Inside (2022)
- The Burn (2022)
- Lifeline (2024)

=== Music videos ===
- After All I've Done (2016)
- Ain't Another Girl (2017),
- Off the Grid (2019),
- Running in Circles (2019)
- Remember This (2020)
- Mackenzie (2020)
- This Scar from You (2021)
- Killing Me Inside (2022)
- The Burn (2022)
- Lifeline (2024)
