= Afternoon Tales the Morning Never Knew =

Studio album by The Birdwatcher
- Released: January 22, 2002
- Recorded: August 2000 – May 2001, The Hope Union, Brooklyn, New York City
- Length: 47:04
- Label: Arena Rock
- Producer: Dan Matz

The Birdwatcher chronology
The Darkest Hour Is Just Before Dawn (2000)	Afternoon Tales the Morning Never Knew (2002)

Professional ratings
Review scores
Source	Rating
AllMusic	3/5 stars
Pitchfork Media	(6.1/10)

Afternoon Tales the Morning Never Knew is the second and final album by The Birdwatcher, the alias used by Dan Matz, frontman of Windsor for the Derby.

== Track listing ==
All songs written by Dan Matz, except where noted.

1. "Afternoon Tales" – 4:04
2. "Empty Boat" – 4:34
3. "Drawn" – 5:03
4. "A Thousand Ants" – 4:04
5. "Country Music" – 3:37
6. "Trouble" (Jim Kimball) – 5:10
7. "Crocodile" – 3:04
8. "The Hush" – 4:45
9. "Afternoon (Reprise)" – 1:28
10. "Sunset Park" (Kamen Goddard/Dan Matz) – 2:15
11. "Astoria 5PM" – 4:23
12. "Air Defines" – 4:37
