= Young Heart Attack =

American rock band

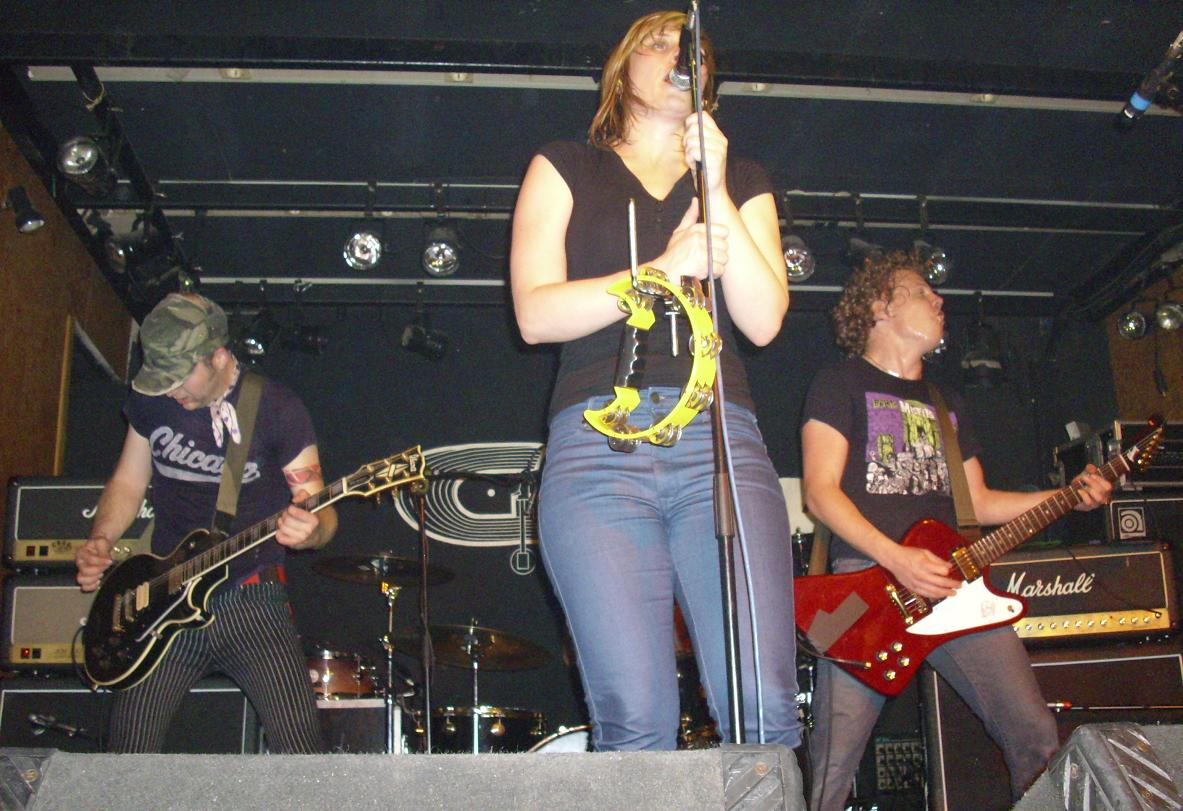
- Young Heart Attack in Madrid, 2008

Background information
- Origin: Austin, Texas, United States
- Genres: Rock
- Years active: 2001-2008
- Past members: Chris Hodge; Jennifer Stephens; Chris "Frenchie" Smith; Steven T. Hall; Joey Shuffield; Paul Etheredge; Jayson Altman

Young Heart Attack (YHA) were a rock band from Austin, Texas, that formed in 2001. Chris "Frenchie" Smith and bassist Steven T. Hall had previously been in the Sixteen Deluxe and Joey Shuffield in Fastball.

== Lineup ==
=== Original (2000–2005) ===
- Chris Hodge - vocals/guitar
- Jennifer Stephens - vocals
- Chris "Frenchie" Smith - guitar
- Steven T. Hall - bass
- Joey Shuffield - drums

=== Second Lineup (2005-2008) ===
- Chris Hodge - vocals / guitar
- Jennifer Stephens - vocals
- Chris "Frenchie" Smith - guitar
- Paul Etheredge - bass
- Jayson Altman - drums

== History ==
For a significant period during their early stages they were a seven-piece band, with members including Tony Scalzo, Alice Spencer, and Bryan Bowden gradually coming and going until they ended up with what is considered their original lineup.

After discovering Young Heart Attack, Cliff Jones was very taken with the band and returned to Austin to record demos at Chris "Frenchie" Smith's Bubble studios. These recordings were issued as a 7-inch single on Leo Silverman's Rex Records boutique imprint. More demos including "Tommy Shots" were recorded and the band signed to XL Records resulting in Mouthful of Love. Jones co-wrote and produced the album, which was recorded at the Bubble. The band played several UK tours, including an arena tour with The Darkness and Motörhead, leading to further collaborations with Motörhead front man Lemmy Kilmister and his appearance on their song "Get It Hot".

After only one studio album, in early 2006 Young Heart Attack announced they were splitting up and ceased work on their second album. However the band regrouped later in 2006. Their second album Rock and Awe was released in 2008.

== Discography ==
- "Over and Over" (single) (2003) XL, UK Singles #84
- "Misty Rowe" (single) (2003) XL
- Mouthful of Love [EP] (2003) XL - initially sold on the band's tour with Motörhead
- Mouthful of Love (2004) XL
- "Tommy Shots" (single) (2004) XL
- "Starlite" (single) (2004) XL
- Rock and Awe (2008) Not on Your Radio
