= Gloryhole (album) =

Studio album by Ed Hall
- Released: April 1992
- Recorded: 1991
- Studio: Smart Studios, Madison, WI
- Genre: Noise rock
- Length: 40:07
- Label: Trance Syndicate
- Producer: Doug Olsen

Ed Hall chronology
Love Poke Here (1990)	Gloryhole (1992)	Motherscratcher (1993)

Professional ratings
Review scores
Source	Rating
Allmusic	2.5/5 stars

Gloryhole is the third studio album by Texas noise rock band Ed Hall, released in April 1992 by Trance Syndicate. Gloryhole was the last Ed Hall album to feature drummer Kevin Whitley, who had been playing with the band since 1987. He was replaced by Lyman Hardy, who had been friends with the band since 1989, shortly before tour in support of Glory commenced.

== Background ==
Ed Hall had already released two albums, Albert and Love Poke Here, on Berkley-based label Boner Records. The band caught the attention of drummer King Coffey, who decided to adopt them to his label Trance Syndicate based the strength of their live performances in opening for the Butthole Surfers' 1991 North American tour.

== Recording ==
The band recorded Gloryhole at Butch Vig's Smart Studios in Madison, Wisconsin and marked their first time recording outside their hometown of Austin. While the band was relieved to be spending less on the process were forced to complete mixing the album themselves as Vig, who had previous commitments with Nirvana, was unable to complete the process himself. Larry Strub said he was more pleased with the resulting music than on any of the group's previous releases, saying "I think it's definitely our best album. Most albums you can pick out one or two [songs] that you wind up not really liking, but on this, I like everything."

== Track listing ==
All tracks are written by Gary Chester, Larry Strub and Kevin Whitley.

No.	Title	Length
1.	"Rachel Hourglass"	4:17
2.	"Hortense Buttermilk"	4:00
3.	"Luke Flukenstock"	3:26
4.	"Scam Cobliber"	3:32
5.	"Bernie Sticky"	5:12
6.	"Destamona P."	3:32
7.	"Guido O'Brien"	4:16
8.	"Roger Mexico"	4:24
9.	"Buster Enamel"	4:23
10.	"Sandra Gubernatorial"	3:05

== Personnel ==
Adapted from the Gloryhole liner notes.

Ed Hall

- Gary Chester – electric guitar, vocals
- Larry Strub – bass guitar, vocals
- Kevin Whitley – drums, vocals

Production and additional personnel

- Brian Anderson – engineering
- Blacksmith – cover art
- Ed Hall – production
- Doug Olsen – production, engineering
- Spot – production (10)

== Release history ==
Region	Date	Label	Format	Catalog
United States	1992	Trance Syndicate	CD, CS, LP	TR-09
