= Johnboy =

Noise rock band from Austin, Texas

- Genres: Noise rock
- Years active: 1991–1994
- Labels: Trance Syndicate
- Spinoffs: Desafinado
- Past members: Tony Bice; Jason Meade; Barry Stone

Johnboy (preferred spelling) was a noise rock band from Austin, Texas, formed in the summer of 1991 by Barry Stone (guitar and vocals), Tony Bice (bass and vocals), and Jason Meade (drums). The three were old friends from Spring, Texas, where they attended high school (Stone and Bice were in a band called The Young Suburbanites.) The sound of Johnboy was heavy and rhythmic, full of hooks and riffs and syncopation. The band recorded two full-length albums: Pistolswing and Claim Dedications, both released on the Trance Syndicate label. The latter was recorded with Steve Albini in Chicago.

After the end of Johnboy, Stone and Bice formed another Trance Syndicate band, Desafinado.

== Discography ==
- Pistolswing (1993)
- Claim Dedications (1994)
