= Claim Dedications =

claim dedications

Studio album by johnboy
- Released: August 29, 1994
- Recorded: Chicago (Steve Albini's home studio)
- Genre: Noise rock
- Length: 30:49
- Label: Trance Syndicate
- Producer: Steve Albini

Johnboy chronology
pistolswing (1993)	claim dedications (1994)

Professional ratings
Review scores
Source	Rating
Allmusic	4.5/5 stars

Claim Dedications (stylized as claim dedications) is the second and final album by johnboy, released on August 29, 1994 through Trance Syndicate.

== Track listing ==
All tracks are written by johnboy.

No.	Title	Length
1.	"Shortstack"	3:01
2.	"Quick to Drain"	3:40
3.	"Driving Reservoirs Up Noses"	5:09
4.	"10w40"	3:31
5.	"Chair"	4:25
6.	"Genus"	2:48
7.	"Pivotal"	2:21
8.	"Lorac"	1:54
9.	"Flung Circles"	3:55

== Personnel ==
- Steve Albini – production, engineering
- Tony Bice – bass guitar, vocals
- Jason Meade – drums
- Barry Stone – guitar, vocals, cover – painting component – oil on glass mirror
