= Emits Showers of Sparks =

Studio album by Sixteen Deluxe
- Released: 1998
- Studio: Hyde Street
- Genre: Psychedelic pop
- Label: Warner Bros.
- Producer: John Croslin

Sixteen Deluxe chronology
Pilot Knob (1997)	Emits Showers of Sparks (1998)	Easy with the Sideways (1997)

Emits Showers of Sparks is the second album by the American band Sixteen Deluxe, released in 1998. The first single was "Purple". The band supported the album with a North American tour that included film projection and a liquid light component. The album was delayed several months, and Warner Bros. Records eventually dropped the band, in part due to Sixteen Deluxe's reluctance to keep touring.

== Production ==
Recorded at Hyde Street Studios, in San Francisco, the album was produced by John Croslin. Most of the songs were written on acoustic guitar. Unlike on their debut album, Sixteen Deluxe were less concerned about burying their pop songs under effects and distortion. "Large Animal Clinic" uses Carrie Clark's lead vocal backed by her vocal harmonies.

== Critical reception ==
Professional ratings
Review scores
Source	Rating
AllMusic	4/5 stars
The Atlanta Journal-Constitution	B+
Austin American-Statesman	3/4 stars
Entertainment Weekly	B+
Fort Worth Star-Telegram	4/5 stars
Knoxville News Sentinel	3.5/5 stars
Lincoln Journal Star	4.5/5 stars
Los Angeles Daily News	3/4 stars
USA Today	3/4 stars

The Salt Lake Tribune noted that "the formula isn't new, a hard-edged guitar attack with pop melodies, laced with psychedelic effects." The San Diego Union-Tribune said that "the most successful efforts here, 'Let It Go' and 'Captain Kirk's Z-Man House of Fun/Mixed Up', are bluesy, melodic and multilayered gems that culminate in slick psychedelic guitar noise." Entertainment Weekly opined that "Sixteen Deluxe offers a witty pastiche of clean-cut '80s pop layered with up-to-the-second guitar-and-electronica distortion." USA Today labeled Emits Showers of Sparks "warm classic pop made rugged by guitar fuzz, electronic static and ... barbed harmonies."

The Lincoln Journal Star stated that, "through the entrancing, softly cool vocals of Carrie Clark and a gruffer variety from Chris Smith, Sixteen Deluxe mixes quality melodies with lots of noise, primarily from guitars, but gets extra depth from percussion and organ." The Los Angeles Daily News determined that the band "create little dark musical corners in even the seemingly cheeriest places." CMJ New Music Monthly concluded that the album "brings on uneasy relief by inducing alternating states of feverish anxiety and narcoleptic bliss." The Knoxville News Sentinel noted that, while "Clark sprints over the blustery tracks with lithe melody, occasional lead vocalist Chris Smith is a weak and flavorless liability."

AllMusic wrote that the "lyrics are more prominent throughout ... no matter who is singing them, at times perhaps embracing a Generation X aesthetic a touch too closely." In 2009, Spin included Sixteen Deluxe on its list of "The 100 Greatest Bands You've (Probably) Never Heard", deeming Emits Showers of Sparks one of "the 1990s' most pleasurably squalling albums."

== Track listing ==
No.	Title	Length
1.	"Sniffy Woe"
2.	"Purple"
3.	"Burning Leaves"
4.	"Let It Go"
5.	"No Shock (In Bubble)"
6.	"Giver"
7.	"Large Animal Clinic"
8.	"Lullaby"
9.	"Wrist Rocket"
10.	"Mexican Train"
11.	"Honey"
12.	"Captain Kirk's Z-Man House of Fun"
13.	"Mixed Up"
