= Paul Newman (band) =

American post rock/math rock band

- Origin: Austin, Texas, United States
- Genres: Post-rock, math rock
- Years active: 1995–present
- Labels: Twistworthy, Trance Syndicate, My Pal God, Temporary Residence, Emperor Jones
- Members: Paul A. Newman; Craig McCaffrey; Anthony Nozero; Edward Robert

Paul Newman is an American, Austin-based post rock/math rock band, taking its name from its bass guitarist. Their music is largely instrumental, creating vast soundscapes with occasional interjections of both subtle and intense vocals.

== History ==
The band was formed in 1995 with an initial line-up of Paul A. Newman (bass guitar), Craig McCaffrey (guitar) and Anthony Nozero (drums). The bass guitarist Eddie Robert joined the following year. Newman and McCaffrey previously played together in the hardcore punk band Brick. After a first single, the band signed to Trance Syndicate, releasing their first album, Frames per Second, on the label in 1997. A second album, Only Love Can Break Your Heart, followed later that year. After Trance Syndicate folded they signed to My Pal God for the 2000 album Machine Is Not Broken.

In 2005, they released This Is How It Is Lost on the Emperor Jones label. Later events regarding the band are unknown, though members have been active performing in other groups. McCaffrey joined The American Analog Set in 2003 and stayed with them until their break-up in 2006. Nozero started an instrumental group with the tuba player Brian Wolff in 1995 before the project ended in 2005. Robert is currently performing in I Love You but I've Chosen Darkness.

== Members ==
- Paul A. Newman (bass guitar)
- Craig McCaffrey (guitar, vocals)
- Anthony Nozero (drums, tuba)
- Edward "Eddie" Robert (bass guitar, electronics, vocals)

== Discography ==
=== Albums ===
- Frames Per Second (1997, Trance Syndicate)
- Only Love Can Break Your Heart (1998, Trance Syndicate)
- Machine Is Not Broken (2000, My Pal God)
- This Is How It Is Lost (2005, Emperor Jones)

=== Singles and EPs ===
- "Please Wait During the Silence" 7-inch (1997, Twistworthy)
- Twistworthy Number Seven CDEP (1997, Twistworthy)
- Travels in Constants, Volume 8 CDEP (2000, Temporary Residence)
- "Way to Breathe No Breath" split 7-inch with Sonna (2001, Temporary Residence)

=== Compilation albums ===
- Re-Issue, Re-Package, Re-Package. Re-Evaluate the Songs (2001, My Pal God)
