= Residual Kid =

American rock band

- Residual Kid live at The Mohawk in Austin, Tx, June 4, 2015

Background information
- Genres: Alternative rock, noise rock, grunge, punk rock
- Years active: 2009–present
- Labels: Sire Records
- Members: Deven Ivy; Ben Redman; Max Redman; David Ziolkowski
- Past members: Grace London; Nik Sherrill
- Website: www.residualkid.com

Residual Kid is an American rock band from Austin, Texas formed in 2009 at rock camp USA. The group consists of Deven Ivy (vocals, guitar), Ben Redman (drums), and Max Redman (bass guitar). They have released three EPs: Box in 2011, which was recorded with an earlier lineup, Faces, featuring the current lineup, in 2012, and Salsa in 2016.

The band has recently signed with Sire Records, an American label owned by Warner Music Group, and released their first EP Salsa with the label in 2016. The two-song digital single The Volcom Sessions was released on Sire at the end of 2016.

== History ==
Formed by Deven Ivy and siblings Max and Ben Redman, who met at a songwriting day camp for youth in 2009, the band quickly gained attention by playing gigs in the Austin, Texas area. In 2010, the band added vocalist Grace London, and together they released their first EP Box. The track "Can't Take Me Away" was featured in an episode of 20/20 about bullying.

In 2011, Residual Kid returned to their original lineup. Fronted by Deven Ivy on lead vocals, the band released their sophomore EP, Faces, on October 9, 2012. The EP was produced by Grammy-nominated producer Chris "Frenchie" Smith. A video for the song Friend, directed by Tony Stout, was released on September 5, 2012.

The band spent the better part of 2014 playing shows across the United States and recording demos with Steve McDonald of Off! and Redd Kross, J Mascis of Dinosaur Jr., and Andre Kelman (Beastie Boys, Cat Power, Jon Spencer Blues Explosion) at the Beastie Boys' Oscilloscope Studios. In July 2014, a cover of The Easybeats song "Friday on My Mind" was released as a charity single, with proceeds donated to Hospice Austin and the Livestrong Foundation.

Residual Kid has been recognized in the Austin music scene, winning Austin Music Poll's "Best Under 18" award in 2013 and 2014, as well as coming in second for "Best Punk Band" in 2014, and winning the category in 2015. The band has performed at music festivals such as SXSW, CMJ, The Underground Music Showcase in Denver, Fun Fun Fun Fest, as well as internationally at Pukkelpop, Way Out West Festival, and Øya Festival.

In 2014, the band caught the eye of Warner Bros. executive Seymour Stein. Stein is famous for launching the careers of The Ramones, Madonna and Talking Heads, and he signed Residual Kid to a record deal with Sire Records in 2015.

Their debut EP with Sire, titled Salsa, was released on April 8, 2016. This was preceded by their first official single, Scentless Princess, on March 14, 2016. The video for Scentless Princess was directed by Joshua Logan and Michael Anthony Gibson. A second video for the song Chill was also shot.

In late 2016, the band released The Volcom Sessions, which was recorded live at Volcom's studios at their company headquarters in Costa Mesa, California.

== Musical style ==
Residual Kid has been inspired by Nirvana, Sonic Youth, AC/DC, and Black Sabbath. Their music is typically described as heavily 1990s era grunge, with clever lyrics and songwriting.

== Discography ==
=== EPs ===
- Box (2011)
- Faces (2012)
- Salsa (2016)
- The Volcom Sessions (2016)

=== Solo projects ===
Starting in August 2014, drummer Benjamin Redman began releasing solo recordings under the name Hard Dwell for download via bandcamp.

- Demo (2014)
- Summer Bummer (2014)
- Alone With You (2016)

February 2015 saw guitarist Deven Ivy release solo recordings of his own on bandcamp.

- Killing Wave (2015)

== Band members ==
Current members

- Deven Ivy – vocals, guitar
- Benjamin Redman – drums
- Max Redman – bass guitar
- David Ziolkowski – guitar

Touring musicians

- Nik Sherrill – guitar

Former members

- Grace London – vocals

== See also ==
- List of alternative rock artists
- List of punk rock bands, L–Z
