= Mouthful of Love =

Studio album by Young Heart Attack
- Released: May 4, 2004
- Genre: Rock
- Length: 34:07
- Language: English
- Label: XL Recordings
- Producer: Cliff Jones & Young Heart Attack

Professional ratings
Review scores
Source	Rating
AllMusic	4/5 stars

Mouthful of Love is the debut album by rock band Young Heart Attack released in 2004.

== Track listing ==
All tracks written by Young Heart Attack, except Track 8 (written by Fred 'Sonic' Smith) and Track 9 (written by Tight Bro's From Way Back When).

1. "Mouthful of Love" - 3:37
2. "Starlite" - 3:41
3. "El Camino" - 3:22
4. "Tommy Shots" - 3:15
5. "(Take Me Back) Mary Jane" - 3:46
6. "To the Teeth" - 2:08
7. "Sick of Doing Time" - 2:40
8. "Over and Over" - 4:52
9. "In Luck" - 2:15
10. "Misty Rowe" - 4:26

Time: 34:07 min.
