= Love Poke Here =

Studio album by Ed Hall
- Released: 1990
- Recorded: Tim Stanton Audio, Austin, TX
- Genre: Noise rock, psychedelic rock
- Length: 44:43
- Label: Boner
- Producer: Brian Beattie, Ed Hall

Ed Hall chronology
Albert (1988)	Love Poke Here (1990)	Gloryhole (1992)

Professional ratings
Review scores
Source	Rating
AllMusic	2/5 stars
Select	1/5 medals

Love Poke Here is the second studio album by Texas noise rock band Ed Hall, released in 1990 by Boner Records.

== Track listing ==
All tracks are written by Gary Chester, Larry Strub and Kevin Whitley.

No.	Title	Length
1.	"Pay for Me"	2:19
2.	"Ollie Ollie"	4:19
3.	"Millionaire's House"	4:11
4.	"Blue Poland"	4:04
5.	"Cornbull"	2:58
6.	"Turkey"	5:13
7.	"Hearty Tom Foolery"	3:05
8.	"Car Talk"	2:07
9.	"Buddha"	3:24
10.	"Go to Sleep"	3:41
11.	"Sam Jackson"	3:48
12.	"Gilbert"	5:29

== Personnel ==
Adapted from the Love Poke Here liner notes.

Ed Hall

- Gary Chester – electric guitar, vocals
- Larry Strub – bass guitar, vocals
- Kevin Whitley – drums, vocals

Production and additional personnel

- Brian Beattie – production
- Ed Hall – production
- Marty Harris – photography
- Phil Mezzetti – engineering
- Tim Stanton – engineering

== Release history ==
Region	Date	Label	Format	Catalog
United States	1990	Boner	CD, CS, LP	BR22
