= Pick Up Heaven =

Studio album by Drain
- Released: March 1992
- Recorded: Ben Blank Audio, Austin, Texas
- Genre: Noise rock, psychedelic rock
- Length: 35:31
- Label: Trance Syndicate
- Producer: Drain

Drain chronology
| Pick Up Heaven (1992) | Offspeed and In There (1996) |

Professional ratings
Review scores
| Source | Rating |
|---|---|
| AllMusic | 4.5/5 stars |

Pick Up Heaven is the debut album of Drain, released in March 1992 through Trance Syndicate. The vocals on "Martyr's Road" were taken from an Islamic chant record that was in Coffey's possession.

== Track listing ==
All tracks are written by Drain.

| No. | Title | Length |
|---|---|---|
| 1. | "National Anthem" | 1:46 |
| 2. | "Crawfish" | 4:33 |
| 3. | "Martyr's Road" | 2:40 |
| 4. | "Non Compis Mentis" | 3:09 |
| 5. | "Funeral Pyre" | 4:08 |
| 6. | "Ozark Monkey Chant" | 4:35 |
| 7. | "Instant Hippie" | 3:34 |
| 8. | "Flower Mound" | 5:33 |
| 9. | "Every Secret Thing" | 4:33 |
| 10. | "The Ballad of Miss Toni Fisher" | 1:00 |

== Personnel ==
Drain

- King Coffey – drums, keyboards, vocals
- David McCreath – guitar, vocals
- Owen McMahon – bass guitar, vocals

Production and additional personnel

- Ben Blank – engineering, mixing, recording
- Drain – production
- Butch Vig – recording on "Crawfish" and "Instant Hippie"
