= Pistolswing =

Studio album by Johnboy
- Released: June 15, 1993
- Studio: Ben Blank Audio, Austin, Texas
- Genre: Noise rock
- Length: 33:42
- Label: Trance Syndicate TR16
- Producer: Johnboy

Johnboy chronology
Pistolswing (1993)	Claim Dedications (1994)

Pistolswing is the debut studio album by Texas hard rock band Johnboy. It was released in 1993 on Trance Syndicate.

== Critical reception ==
Professional ratings
Review scores
Source	Rating
AllMusic	3/5 stars
The Encyclopedia of Popular Music	3/5 stars

Option wrote that the band "writes discreet units of action which are thrown together in unexpected arrangements."

== Track listing ==
All tracks are written by Johnboy.

No.	Title	Length
1.	"Admiration"	3:42
2.	"Sourmouth"	4:47
3.	"Sunday Two"	3:31
4.	"Pistol Swing"	2:40
5.	"Hold"	2:28
6.	"Freestanding"	3:33
7.	"New Jersey Roadbase"	3:43
8.	"Yellow"	5:30
9.	"I"	3:48

== Personnel ==
Johnboy

- Tony Bice – bass guitar, vocals, photography
- Jason Meade – drums
- Barry Stone – guitar, vocals

Production and additional personnel

- Aaron Garbutt – photography
- Paul Stautinger – engineering
- Jerry Tubb – mastering
