= Offspeed and In There =

Offspeed and in There

Studio album by Drain
- Released: March 5, 1996
- Genre: Noise rock, psychedelic rock
- Length: 48:34
- Label: Trance Syndicate
- Producer: King Coffey

Drain chronology
Pick Up Heaven (1992)	Offspeed and in There (1996)

Offspeed and in There is the second album by the American band Drain, released in 1996 through Trance Syndicate.

== Critical reception ==
Spin named the album one of "The 10 Best Albums You Didn't Hear in '96", writing that King Coffey mixes "snatches of sitar, Sadie, bird calls, the Boredoms, cockpit jabber, and himself goofing around on Middle Eastern stringed instruments." The Dallas Observer listed the album as one of the 10 best Texas albums of 1996.

== Track listing ==
All tracks are written by King Coffey, except "Upright & Locked" by Erik Satie.

No.	Title	Length
1.	"Playground Twist"	3:37
2.	"Burma Slowdrive"	4:12
3.	"Return to Rosedale"	4:06
4.	"Marrakesh: 3AM"	4:22
5.	"A Bunch of Guys About to Turn Blue"	3:29
6.	"Helicopters Are Burning"	4:05
7.	"Saipan Murder Mystery"	3:55
8.	"Stop Six"	4:33
9.	"Wendy Will Win"	4:48
10.	"The Nitrous Shuffle"	3:42
11.	"In the Spring We Eat Cucumbers"	2:59
12.	"Upright & Locked"	4:46

== Personnel ==
- King Coffey – drums, keyboards, vocals, production
- David McCreath – guitar, vocals, design
- Owen McMahon – bass guitar, vocals
