= Motherscratcher =

Studio album by Ed Hall
- Released: 1993
- Recorded: May 24 – June 2, 1993
- Studio: Ben Blake Audio, Austin, TX
- Genre: Noise rock
- Length: 70:49
- Label: Trance Syndicate
- Producer: Adam Wiltzie

Ed Hall chronology
Gloryhole (1992)	Motherscratcher (1993)	La La Land (1995)

Professional ratings
Review scores
Source	Rating
AllMusic	4.5/5 stars

Motherscratcher is the fourth studio album by Texas noise rock band Ed Hall, released in 1993 by Trance Syndicate.

== Critical reception ==
The Washington Post wrote: "Arty primitives, the members of Ed Hall (none of them named Ed or Hall) delight in childish scenarios (like that of 'White House Girls'), simplistic rhythms and noisy guitars."

== Track listing ==
All tracks are written by Gary Chester, Lyman Hardy and Larry Strub.

No.	Title	Length
1.	"White House Girls"	3:12
2.	"Big Head"	3:58
3.	"Lungs"	4:33
4.	"Dave the Prophet"	4:10
5.	"Gnomes"	6:33
6.	"Satori in Manhattan, Kansas"	3:46
7.	"Twenty Dollar Bill"	3:57
8.	"Leave Me Alone"	5:08
9.	"Urgent Message for All Mankind"	2:26
10.	"Afghani Harvest Period"	7:45
23.	"[untitled]"	23:55

== Personnel ==
Adapted from the Motherscratcher liner notes.

Ed Hall

- Gary Chester – electric guitar, vocals, cover art
- Lyman Hardy – drums
- Larry Strub – bass guitar, vocals

Production and additional personnel

- Marty Harris – photography
- Adam Wiltzie – production, mixing

== Release history ==
Region	Date	Label	Format	Catalog
United States	1993	Trance Syndicate	CD, LP	TR-20
