= Surrender to All Life Beyond Form =

Studio album by Dark Castle
- Released: 2011
- Recorded: September 2010
- Studio: Electrical Audio and Semaphore Recording Studios
- Genre: Doom metal
- Length: 33:49
- Label: Profound Lore
- Producer: Sanford Parker

Dark Castle chronology
Spirited Migration (2009)	Surrender to All Life Beyond Form (2011)

Professional ratings
Review scores
Source	Rating
Allmusic	3/5 stars
Revolver	(1.5/5)

Surrender to All Life Beyond Form is the second studio album by Dark Castle.

The album was released in CD and vinyl form via Profound Lore Records. A 12" vinyl version was released through Brutal Panda Records, limited to 500 copies.

In support of this album, Dark Castle embarked on a summer tour of North America alongside YOB.

== Track listing ==
1. "Surrender to All Life Beyond Form" – 4:05
2. "Stare into Absence" – 3:52
3. "Create an Impulse" – 2:01
4. "Seeing Through Time" – 4:43
5. "Heavy Eyes" – 5:59
6. "Spirit Ritual" – 3:22
7. "To Hide Is to Die" – 2:34
8. "I Hear Wind" – 3:54
9. "Learning to Unlearn" – 3:19

== Personnel ==
- Stevie Floyd – vocals, guitar, bass, piano, artwork
- Rob Shaffer – vocals, drums, guitar, bass
- Blake Judd – vocals on "Learning to Unlearn"
- Nate Hall – vocals on "Stare into Absence"
- Mike Scheidt – vocals on "Spirit Ritual"
- Sanford Parker – production, synthesizer, samples
- Orion Landau – artwork, layout
- Collin Jordan – mastering
