= Victory Parts =

Studio album by AC Acoustics
- Released: 1997
- Recorded: 1997
- Genre: Indie rock
- Length: 49:28
- Label: Elemental
- Producer: Dare Mason

AC Acoustics chronology
Able Treasury (1994)	Victory Parts (1997)	Understanding Music (2000)

Victory Parts is the second album by Scottish indie rock band AC Acoustics. The album was widely acclaimed in the music press and displays an evolution of the band's sound from The Jesus and Mary Chain-derived noiseniks to wall-of-sound rock.

== Critical reception ==
NME praised the album, and particularly singled out the single "I Messiah, Am Jailer", as being "one of the most sweoonsome noise-pop singles ever".

Professional ratings
Review scores
Source	Rating
New Musical Express	8/10 stars

== Track listing ==
1. Hand Passes Empty
2. Stunt Girl
3. Ex Quartermaster
4. Admirals All
5. Hammerhead
6. Kill Zane
7. Fast
8. Continuity Freak
9. High Divers
10. Absent Luck Liner
11. I Messiah Am Jailer
12. Can't See Anything (Red Not Yellow)
