= Instant Winner =

Studio album by Distorted Pony
- Released: April 1994
- Recorded: 1993
- Genre: Noise rock, industrial rock
- Length: 51:43
- Label: Trance Syndicate
- Producer: Steve Albini

Distorted Pony chronology
Punishment Room (1992)	Instant Winner (1994)

Professional ratings
Review scores
Source	Rating
AllMusic	4.5/5 stars

Instant Winner is the second album by Distorted Pony, released in 1994 through Trance Syndicate. By the time of the album's release, the band had already parted ways the previous year.

The Dallas Observer called the album "impossible to listen to in its entirety."

== Track listing ==
All tracks are written by Distorted Pony.

No.	Title	Length
1.	"Dept. of Existence"	4:53
2.	"Smitten"	2:40
3.	"Lamb Stink"	3:04
4.	"Big Sprawling Corrupt"	4:02
5.	"Dollar Pizza"	3:02
6.	"Slow Leak"	6:40
7.	"Go Kart"	4:21
8.	"Sparkle"	5:37
9.	"Cripple"	4:36
10.	"Fifty Cent Pizza"	3:01
11.	"A Fine View from the Temple"	9:47

== Personnel ==
Distorted Pony

- Robert Hammer – guitar
- Theodore Jackson – drums, percussion
- Dora Jahr – bass guitar, vocals
- London May – drums
- David Uskovich – guitar, vocals

Production and additional personnel

- Steve Albini – engineering
- Distorted Pony – production
