= La La Land (Ed Hall album) =

Studio album by Ed Hall
- Released: May 23, 1995
- Recorded: December 1994 in Algiers, Algeria
- Genre: Noise rock, experimental rock
- Length: 77:18
- Label: Trance Syndicate
- Producer: Ed Hall

Ed Hall chronology
Motherscratcher (1993)	La La Land (1995)

Professional ratings
Review scores
Source	Rating
Allmusic	2/5 stars

La La Land is the fifth and final studio album by Texas noise rock band Ed Hall, released on May 23, 1995 by Trance Syndicate.

== Track listing ==
All tracks are written by Gary Chester, Lyman Hardy and Larry Strub.

No.	Title	Length
1.	"Pollution"	4:05
2.	"Fanblades of Love"	5:37
3.	"Weirdo Song"	5:20
4.	"Huge Giant Omen"	5:03
5.	"The Hybrid"	4:23
6.	"Music for Couches"	4:53
7.	"Angel"	3:55
8.	"Parallel Universe"	3:38
9.	"Euphonious Sophistry"	6:06
10.	"Sad & Beautiful World"	2:53
11.	"Flipper"	4:52
12.	"1970-711"	7:44
13.	"----"	18:43

== Personnel ==
Adapted from the La La Land liner notes.

Ed Hall

- Gary Chester – electric guitar, vocals
- Lyman Hardy – drums, photography
- Larry Strub – bass guitar, vocals

Production and additional personnel

- John Golden – mastering
- Ed Hall – production
- Brian Fulk – engineering
- Martin Harris – photography
- Adam Wiltzie – engineering

== Release history ==
Region	Date	Label	Format	Catalog
United States	1995	Trance Syndicate	CD, LP	TR-36
