= Spirited Migration =

Studio album by Dark Castle
- Released: 2009
- Genre: Doom metal
- Label: At a Loss Recordings

Dark Castle chronology
Spirited Migration (2009)	Surrender to All Life Beyond Form (2011)

Professional ratings
Review scores
Source	Rating
Rock Sound	8/10 stars

Spirited Migration is the debut studio album by American doom metal band Dark Castle, released in 2009.

== Track listing ==
No.	Title	Length
1.	"Awake in Sleep"	6:51
2.	"Into the Past"	5:35
3.	"Spirited Migration"	1:46
4.	"Growing Slow"	4:31
5.	"Weather the Storm"	3:26
6.	"Flight Beyond"	4:14
7.	"Grasping the Awe"	4:12
8.	"A Depth Returns"	6:33
