= Walking Timebombs (album) =

Live album by Walking Timebombs
- Released: August 26, 1997
- Genre: Noise rock, industrial
- Length: 51:39
- Label: Charnel Music
- Producer: Scott Ayers

Walking Timebombs chronology
Walking Timebombs (1997)	Static Migration (1998)

Professional ratings
Review scores
Source	Rating
Allmusic	2/5 stars

Walking Timebombs is the eponymously titled debut album of Walking Timebombs, released on August 26, 1997 through Charnel Music.

== Track listing ==
All music is composed by Walking Timebombs.

No.	Title	Length
1.	"Microcosm"	2:08
2.	"Been Broken"	3:11
3.	"Ultra High Gain Overload"	2:13
4.	"Lone Nut"	4:10
5.	"Voice Box"	0:50
6.	"What Hope"	4:51
7.	"Throb"	1:53
8.	"Airwaves"	2:46
9.	"Swarm"	9:27
10.	"Amnesia"	2:42
11.	"Holy Man"	2:43
12.	"Hollow Whole"	3:29
13.	"Pikes"	11:21
14.	"Fade"	9:34

== Personnel ==
- Scott Ayers – tape, production, engineering, recording
- Frank Garymartin – drums
- Tim Thomson – cover art
