= Punishment Room =

Studio album by Distorted Pony
- Released: May 1992
- Recorded: January 1992
- Genre: Noise rock, industrial rock
- Length: 27:13
- Label: Bomp! Records
- Producer: Distorted Pony

Distorted Pony chronology
Work Makes Freedom (1991)	Punishment Room (1992)	Instant Winner (1994)

Professional ratings
Review scores
Source	Rating
Allmusic	2.5/5 stars

Punishment Room is the debut album of Distorted Pony, released in 1992 through Bomp!. The CD version of the album contains the band's previous release, Work Makes Freedom. The album was recorded in early 1992 with the help of Steve Albini.

== Track listing ==
All tracks are written by Distorted Pony.

No.	Title	Length
1.	"HOD"	2:23
2.	"Death in the Turnstile"	2:23
3.	"God's List"	1:46
4.	"Splinter"	2:32
5.	"Krank"	3:31
6.	"Gut Bug"	3:23
7.	"Castration Anxiety"	3:31
8.	"Powerless"	2:42
9.	"Plague Bed"	1:56
10.	"Down Where The Dirt Collects"	3:01

Work Makes Freedom EP
No.	Title	Length
11.	"Fee Schedule"	2:26
12.	"Sinner's Prayer"	2:44
13.	"Forensic Interest"	2:47
14.	"Blare"	4:50
15.	"Pillar of Salt"	1:32

== Personnel ==
Distorted Pony

- Robert Hammer – guitar, vocals on "Forensic Interest"
- Theodore Jackson – drums, percussion
- Dora Jahr – bass guitar, vocals
- London May – drums
- David Uskovich – guitar, vocals

Production and additional personnel

- Steve Albini – engineering
- Distorted Pony – production
