= AC Acoustics =

Scottish indie rock band

Background information
- Origin: Glasgow, Scotland
- Genres: Alternative rock
- Years active: 1990–2003
- Labels: Trance Syndicate; Elemental; Yoyo Recordings; Cooking Vinyl; Fire Records (UK); One Little Indian
- Members: Paul Campion; Caz Riley; Dave Gormley; Mark Raine; Paul Murray
- Past members: Roger Ward; James Barrett- Bunnage Reid Cunningham

AC Acoustics were a Scottish indie rock band from Glasgow, formed in 1990. Over their thirteen years of existence, they released a string of singles, EPs and albums on a number of independent record labels. They split up in 2003.

== Biography ==
=== Early career ===
AC Acoustics formed in Glasgow in 1990. Initially, they were heavily inspired by The Jesus and Mary Chain – blending white noise with early Pavement-style experimentation and, on occasion, augmenting their two guitar, bass and drums instrumentation with saxophones and violins.

Their first recording was the 1992 five-track Wrist Eye demo, which featured Gerard Love from Teenage Fanclub on backing vocals. The demo gained them a recording contract with the independent label Elemental Records, who released their debut single, Sweatlodge/MV, in 1993. Displaying an aptitude for getting on the bill at disproportionately high-profile gigs, they opened for PJ Harvey, Spacemen 3 and The Jesus Lizard, amongst others.

=== Debut album and growing interest ===
In 1994, the band's debut album, Able Treasury, was released, which provided a demonstration of the unusual approach to song titles that would continue throughout their career (amongst others, the album featured songs called Mother Head Sander, Oregon Pine Washback and Sister Grab Operator). Shortly after this release, Mark Raine replaced Roger Ward on guitar and the band then began work on their next album.

Victory Parts was released in 1997 and the band promoted it through tours with Embrace, Stereophonics, dEUS and Placebo (Brian Molko was a champion of the band and often wore a Stunt Girl T-shirt, including on Placebo's Top of the Pops appearance for Nancy Boy). By this time, their sound had evolved into dense, fuzz-heavy riff-based music with cryptic, poetic lyrics.

In 1999 one of the band's songs was chosen to be on Seriously Scottish: Music from Contemporary Scotland, a CD compiled by the Scottish Arts Council to send to cultural ministries in other countries.

Despite the accolades for Victory Parts in the music press, AC Acoustics remained a cult act. They were at times called "a typically unambitious indie band". They left Elemental and signed with Yoyo Recordings, releasing the EPs Like Ribbons and She's With Stars. They parted with Yoyo in 2000 and moved to Cooking Vinyl, releasing a further EP Crush (continuing the Placebo connection thanks to backing vocal contributions from Brian Molko).

=== Final albums and break-up ===
The band's line-up was augmented by a keyboardist, Paul Murray, and two further albums, Understanding Music and O followed, the latter being quickly completed in ten days. Understanding Music was described by The Scotsman as "their best album to date", with The Times noting "intimate confessionals and juddering guitars that threaten to tumble from the skies". A favorable review in The Guardian said, "There are times when only introspection will do, and those are the moments when AC Acoustics come into their own" whilst the NME claimed the album "...smashes the limited boundaries of its particular genre." A BBC Music review marking the re-release of Understanding Music, published in 2010, commented: "...we can today give AC Acoustics the recognition and respect they deserved a decade ago."

The band split up in 2003.

They featured twice in John Peel's annual Festive 50 chart, both tracks featuring on the Victory Parts album:

- "Stunt Girl" (Number 26 in 1996)
- "I Messiah Am Jailer" (Number 19 in 1997)

Prior to AC Acoustics, Dave Gormley played drums for fellow Glaswegian band Thrum.

=== Understanding Music reissue 2010 ===
Fire records reissued Understanding Music in 2010, receiving a glowing 8/10 review from Drowned in Sound.

== Discography ==
=== Albums ===
- Able Treasury (1994)
- Victory Parts (1997)
- Understanding Music (2000)
- O (2002)

=== Singles ===
- "Wrist Eye" (five-track demo UK 1992)
- "Sweatlodge" / "MV" (7" blue vinyl UK 1993)
- "Hand Passes Plenty" (CD EP UK 1994)
- "Stunt Girl" (CD EP UK 1996)
- "I Messiah Am Jailer" (single-sided 7" grey vinyl UK 1997)
- "I Messiah Am Jailer" / "High Divers" (7" UK 1997)
- "Like Ribbons" (CD EP UK 1999)
- "She's With Stars" (CD EP UK 1999)
- "Crush" (CD EP UK 2000)
