= Pain Teens =

American noise rock band

- Origin: Houston, Texas, United States
- Genres: Noise rock, alternative rock, experimental rock
- Years active: 1985–1995
- Labels: Anomie, Trance Syndicate
- Members: Scott Ayers; Bliss Blood; Kirk Carr; Frank Garymartin

Pain Teens was an experimental noise rock band formed in Houston, Texas in 1985 by Scott Ayers and Bliss Blood. The band used tape manipulation, digital delays, sampling, tape cut-ups and other effects in their music. They also included guitar, violin, marimba, saxophone, percussion, and many other musical instruments.

Beginning in 1987, Pain Teens released nine cassette tapes and two LPs on their own Anomie Records label, all of which went out of print. Soon after, they released four LPs for Trance Syndicate Records, an Austin, Texas label run by King Coffey of the band Butthole Surfers. Their eponymous first LP release was re-released by Mason Jones and Charnel Music in 1998.

== History ==
In 1985, Houston residents Bliss Blood and Scott Ayers formed The Pain Teens. The group was signed to King Coffey's Trance Syndicate label for their offbeat-yet-nightmarish psychedelic music—similar to labelmates Crust and Coffey's band, Butthole Surfers.

Drummer Frank Garymartin and bassist Kirk Carr joined the band in 1990.

The Pain Teens broke up in 1995. Blood moved to New York City that year and began playing solo gigs on her ukulele doing 1920s tunes and original music, playing with guitarist Al Street and forming several groups, including The Moonlighters in 1998. The Moonlighters have released four CDs on their own label, ONLIEST Records, and their fifth CD Enchanted was released on WorldSound Records, a Seattle-based label, in July 2009. Ayers still resides in Houston, and has played with a number of other bands since, including Truth Decay and Walking Timebombs. He currently plays with Frog Hair. Garymartin briefly played with Helios Creed, and launched a hip-hop act under the name of Hundred. Kirk Carr died of cancer in May 2008.

== Discography ==
=== Albums ===
- Pain Teens (1988, Anomie)
- Case Histories (1989, Anomie)
- Born in Blood (1990, Trance Syndicate)
- Stimulation Festival (1992, Trance Syndicate)
- Destroy Me, Lover (1993, Trance Syndicate)
- Beast of Dreams (1995, Trance Syndicate)

=== Singles and EPs ===
- "Bondage" (1990, Rave)
- "Lady of Flame" (1991, Smilin' Ear)
- "Sacrificial Shack" (1992, C/Z)
- "Come Up and See Me Sometime" (1992, C/Z)
- "Death Row Eyes" (1992, Sub Pop)

=== Cassettes ===
- Psychoactive (1986, Anomie)
- Manmade Disasters (1987, Anomie)
- Cathy (1987, Anomie)
- Pain Teens IV (1987, Anomie)
- King God (1987, Anomie)
- Obliviated (1987, Anomie)
- Dog Spirits (1988, Anomie)
- Narcolepsy (1988, Anomie)
- Collective Unconscious Mythology and You (1988, Anomie)
