= The Boxing Lesson =

American rock band

- Origin: Austin / Los Angeles, United States
- Genres: Psychedelic rock, ambient, space rock, indie rock, shoegaze, noise rock, lo-fi
- Members: Paul Waclawsky; Jaylinn Davidson; Dancing Eagle
- Past members: Jake Mitchell; Ben Redman; Phil Cobb; Casey Jones; John Treanor; Daniel Haworth; Matt Bongirno; Ryan Cano; Venny Nunez; Michael Orendy; Mel Dillon; Eric Von Harding; Christine Bruton; Garrett Johnson

The Boxing Lesson is a rock band from Austin, Texas. A power trio with synthesizers performing the bass player's role, they create a mammoth psychedelic 'wall of sound' that begins minimally and builds into grand orchestrations. Vocalist and guitarist Paul Waclawsky and synthesizer player Jaylinn Davidson combine strong songwriting with desert rock, guitar freak-outs, soul space jams and plenty of Texas rock ’n’ roll thunder.

== The Boxing Lesson EP ==
The Boxing Lesson was formed in Los Angeles by Paul Waclawsky in 2002, where they recorded and released their first two EPs on their own label, Send Me Your Head Records. The first, self-titled effort gained strong local buzz and earned the band many shows supporting touring national bands. The intricate melodies of the three guitars complemented each other, with the intense volume, the multiple timbres created a rich sonic palette. The EP was described by the LA Weekly as one that "tests your patience and then rewards it." Joseph Kyle from MundaneSounds wrote that, "The promise on The Boxing Lesson is so great, that you'd probably want to hold them to their potential in a court of law." Some international acclaim was received as well. Noise Theory Australia gave it 5-stars, and wrote that, "Each of the four tracks on this debut self-titled EP gracefully drift through the dark night, and with every intricate guitar melody there is a star that lights the way," and "The Boxing Lesson have addressed every issue that has ever plagued atmospheric rock and mended them in what seems like a manner that seems to simple to be true."

== Radiation ==
The band quickly recorded a follow up with Matt Brown and Chris Pearson at Sonikwire Studios in Irvine, CA. Expanding on the sound of the debut EP, the band incorporated classical music, more Moog synthesizers, ambient effects and a new bass player. The EP also included a woozy live version of the Acetone song, "Don't Cry", that was recorded at Reservoir Tip Studios by Anthony Arvizu. The track was recorded live, with all guitars and drums bleeding into each other. John Treanor and Phil Cobb recorded their guitars without using headphones; bending their battle-axes through space, their headstocks imbibing the sanguine dust in the room. Consequently, Radiation, received more impressive national and international reviews, with Splendid Magazine describing it as "promising, if imperfect". Australian blog, Halo-17, gave the record a favorable 8.5/10 rating and said,"If you only take a chance on one new rock album this month, make it this one," and "The Boxing Lesson cut all the fat from their music, and produced a record which shows that they're a band that should be taken seriously, in addition to providing some of the best music I've heard so far in 2004."

== Songs in the Key of C ==
In late 2004, Waclawsky relocated from California to Texas, where he assembled a new lineup including Jaylinn Davidson on synthesizers and Jake Mitchell on drums. Practicing and writing songs for a full year before playing live, the band recorded Songs in the Key of C with Tim Gerron at Music Lab in Austin, TX. The sound was a wild departure from the two previous EPs. The Onion's Los Angeles Calendar Section wrote, "Gone are the laid-back vocals and gauzy guitars, replaced by passionate singing, frenzied power chords, and tons of gurgling analog synthesizers." The Austin Chronicle gave the release 3 stars and wrote, "Though claiming 'Indie Rock Is Dead', the Boxing Lesson's Songs in the Key of C provides enough lo-fi life support in its tales of criminals and crackheads to stay the reaper." Meanwhile, Smother Magazine wrote, "The Boxing Lesson are an indie rock band on a mission to the moon."

== Wild Streaks & Windy Days ==
After doing several tours promoting Songs in the Key of C, the band quickly went back to Tim Gerron in 2007 to record their debut full-length album. Focusing on more atmospheric textures and varied styles of songwriting, the 12-song album, Wild Streaks & Windy Days, took 8 months to record and was eventually self-released at SXSW 2008 to positive reviews. Barrett King of Baltimore's Sën magazine compared the sound of the album to that of other space rock acts like Pink Floyd and David Bowie, while LA Cityzine praised its "rich lyrical offerings and strong musicianship". The Lemur Blog in Sweden wrote, ""The result is spaced out, it's probably the best space rock album you can find within the scrutinized confines of 2008.". The Music Reviewer gave the album a 9.0/10 and said, "It's an amazing mix of the past and the present, without being too much of either. It's a group that you'll hear more of in the future, and it's a group that knows how to pay homage to – and not just copy – their idols from the past." Indiecision blog from India described The Boxing Lesson's sound as, "if Failure and Pink Floyd got together to drink mushroom tea out of fancy little teacups and chase the white rabbit with Brian Eno and Robert Smith".

Eric Power directed the music video for "Dark Side of the Moog" from Wild Streaks and Windy Days, featuring an animated version of the band exploring an alien planet. A stop motion music video for the track "Brighter" was released as well. The video, directed by Victor Yiu, was constructed from over 6000 still images. Additionally, the band released a guerrilla-cam-style video for Dance with Meow shot by Matt Robertson which featured the band dressed in furry cat masks, chasing the White Rabbit, doing cat-nip and visiting local-haunts in Austin's nightlife.

== Jake Mitchell ==
In August 2008, the band's drummer, Jake Mitchell, was sentenced to five years of prison after being charged by the Austin police for "conspiracy to manufacture marijuana". Before Mitchell went to prison, the band went into the studio to record a number of tracks that could become the foundation of a new EP.

On February 14, 2009, Daytrotter posted a session recorded live in Rock Island, IL, featuring an unreleased song, "Room 17," that was written as a tribute to Mitchell.

== Fur State ==
On October 26, 2010, The Boxing Lesson released Fur State, a lo-fi acoustic/electronic instrumental album recorded on a 4-track by Waclawsky and Davidson in 2004. The album heavily features synthesizers and drum loops and marks a turning point in the evolution of the band. The album name is a play on words for the "first eight" songs recorded in Austin. Self-released on homemade cassette tapes, the album cover depicts the State of Texas in a tiger fur pattern. Some of these songs are instrumental stripped down versions of songs that appeared on Songs in the Key of C and Wild Streaks & Windy Days. Cassette restoration and Mastering by Danny Reisch at Good Danny's in Austin, Texas.

An animated music video by Jeanne Hospod was released for the opening track, "One". It features a ghost-rodeo, space-travel, feminine beauty, psychedelic felines, art and enlightenment from the far reaches of Austin, TX. Hospod released an erotic animated video for the track "Four" in early 2011. The artist's description was, "Alien woman seduces hapless human male involving a very unusual flower." Nathan Guy directed a non-animated cat-themed video for the track "Three" that was released at SXSW 2011. The director described the video as "Morphing cats' psychedelic journey through the Fur State," and video blended live performance shots with warped smoky images showing the band in costume hanging at local Austin haunts.

== Muerta EP ==
The Boxing Lesson released a collection of four slow-tempo psychedelic tracks entitled Muerta EP in the summer of 2011. These songs were recorded over several years in Austin, TX with several drummers. These four recordings chronicle the band's evolution during this time period and are an expansion of their space rock sound. Vivogig reviewer Jim Sells says, "Well, the Boxing Lesson nails it on Muerta.” Pink Floyd influences the music but there is more to their sound than a Floyd fixation. Elements of M83, the Northern Soul-period of The Verve, and the adventurousness of Ponytail all are present here. The effects-laden guitar weaves in and out of the soaring Moog parts, creating a sonic landscape that draws the listener in from the first sound. Sells goes on to note that "Muerta has to be in my Top 10 for the year. There is just nothing like it out there." A double 7inch vinyl set was pressed by New Fortune Records. The "Muerta" music video directed by Jonathan London and animated by Will Kistler was also released. The CGI enhanced video depicts the band drowning to the depths of the sea.

== Health is the New Drug b/w Better Daze ==
"Health is the New Drug" was released as a single along with b-side "Better Daze" in February 2012. New Fortune Records, a Detroit imprint, pressed a vinyl single. It's the first track being released from the upcoming Big Hits LP produced by Chris "Frenchie" Smith (Trail of Dead, Meat Puppets, Ume). The song features psychedelic guitar riffs, a wall of synthesizers, and a few words of wisdom (or caution). "Relying on MOOG for bottom end and tons of sonic noise, the songs blend Meddle-era Floyd guitar freak-outs with M83 propulsion, Spiritualized soul space jams with Texas rock ’n’ roll thunder." High praise came from the Houston Press who said, "Seriously, "Health is the New Drug" is the best song we've heard this year." An animated music video for Better Daze was released at the end of 2012. The video depicts a meteor filled with dark life forms plummeting into Earth releasing bizarre creatures on Austin, TX. Directed by Eric Power the video combines live action with cut paper shadow animation filmed on a green screen. Houston Press ranked Better Daze number 15 in their Top 25 music videos of 2012.

== Big Hits! ==
Big Hits! is the first full-length album released by The Boxing Lesson in five years. It's more rock-oriented than The Boxing Lesson's past albums and is produced by Chris "Frenchie" Smith (...And You Will Know Us By The Trail of Dead, The Darkness, Dandy Warhols, Ringo Deathstarr) at The Bubble in Austin, TX. Big Hits! was released at SXSW 2013 to positive reviews. The Austin Chronicle gave it 3 ½ stars and said, “Arms buried deep in galactic mud, the Boxing Lesson takes an outer space journey to the center of the Earth.”

Making this new album was difficult for the Boxing Lesson. When Paul Waclawsky and keyboardist Jaylinn Davidson began writing the band's second LP four punishing years ago, they planned to name it Possibilities. Only after enduring a creative dry spell did they reject that title. The album was mixed by Kevin Butler at Test Tube Audio, and mastered off analog tape by Jerry Tubb at Terra Nova in Austin, TX. The results brought the project to completion, except for the album name. Utilizing a clever triple entendre, they renamed it Big Hits! and emerged with a 12th round knockout.

== Musical style ==
The band's sound primarily is built around a psychedelic space rock ethos, with Paul Waclawsky's dark melodic guitar work using reverb, fuzz, and tape delay effects, and Jaylinn Davidson's heavy use of Moog synthesizers. The band has not had a stringed bass player since relocating to Austin, the rhythmic function of the bassline is instead performed on the synth. Haunting vocals and moody melodies are punctuated by mesmerizing guitars, droney beats and expressive electronica. The Boxing Lesson plays "space" rock that can transport the listener to another dimension and beyond. Culturespill blog said, "An up-and-coming threesome out of Austin, Texas, The Boxing Lesson betray a rather thinly veiled affinity for Pink Floyd but they roughen the edges of that influence with an open-armed embrace of Spacemen 3, The Cure, Radiohead and Broken Social Scene. Craig Franklin from Halo-17 Australia wrote, "Not enough bands make music like The Boxing Lesson any more. Over the course of three EPs, they've managed to create some truly breathtaking and epic music that draw the dots between such seemingly disparate bands as Pink Floyd, My Bloody Valentine and David Bowie. They're equally at home writing short, concise pop songs, and kicking out the jams. They use a Moog synth extensively. In short, unlike a lot of bands, they're consistently 'interesting'."

== Discography ==
- Big Hits! (2013)
- Health is the New Drug (2012)
- Muerta EP (2011)
- Fur State (2010)
- Wild Streaks and Windy Days (2008)
- Songs in the Key of C (2006)
- Radiation (2004)
- The Boxing Lesson (2003)
