= Able Treasury =

Studio album by AC Acoustics
- Released: 1994
- Recorded: 1994
- Studio: S.H. Studios
- Genre: Indie rock
- Length: 55:25
- Label: Trance Syndicate
- Producer: Graeme Paul Richie, AC Acoustics

AC Acoustics chronology
| Able Treasury (1994) | Victory Parts (1997) |

Professional ratings
Review scores
| Source | Rating |
|---|---|
| AllMusic | 2/5 stars |

Able Treasury was the first studio album from the Scottish indie rock band AC Acoustics.

== Track listing ==
1. Mother Head Sander
2. King Dick
3. Three
4. Leather Buyer
5. Fat Abbey
6. Sister Grab Operator
7. Oregon Pine Washback
8. M.V.
9. Sweatlodge
