= Work Makes Freedom =

EP by Distorted Pony
- Released: September 11, 1992
- Genre: Noise rock, industrial rock
- Length: 14:20
- Label: Bomp! Records
- Producer: Distorted Pony

Distorted Pony chronology
Work Makes Freedom (1992)	Punishment Room (1992)

Work Makes Freedom is an EP by Distorted Pony, released in September 1991 through Bomp!. The EP was initially released as a 12" vinyl, however all of the tracks would later appear on the CD version of the band's 1992 album Punishment Room. Some versions of the record were single-sided, with the second side containing etchings of song lyrics.

== Track listing ==
All tracks are written by Distorted Pony.

Side one
No.	Title	Length
1.	"Fee Schedule"	2:26
2.	"Sinner's Prayer"	2:44

Side two
No.	Title	Length
1.	"Forensic Interest"	2:47
2.	"Blare"	4:50
3.	"Pillar of Salt"	1:32

== Personnel ==
- Theodore Jackson – drums, percussion
- Dora Jahr – bass guitar, vocals
- Robert Hammer – guitar, vocals on "Forensic Interest"
- David Uskovich – guitar, vocals
