= Sapsucker (album) =

Studio album by Walking Timebombs
- Released: 2001
- Recorded: The Keloid Clinic (Houston, TX)
- Length: 48:15
- Label: Anomie
- Producer: Scott Ayers

Walking Timebombs chronology
The Sleeping Sickness (1999)	Sapsucker (2001)

Sapsucker is the fourth and final studio album by the Walking Timebombs, released in 2001 by Anomie Records.

== Track listing ==
All tracks are written by Walking Timebombs.

No.	Title	Length
1.	"Junkyard Dog"	4:43
2.	"Never"	2:21
3.	"Eden"	2:56
4.	"Velvet"	4:06
5.	"Good Thoughts"	3:50
6.	"Space Country"	3:52
7.	"Volcano"	3:40
8.	"Parasite"	3:43
9.	"China Doll"	2:11
10.	"Dive"	4:07
11.	"Dead End Street"	2:12
12.	"Fallen"	3:34
13.	"Between The Lines"	2:29
14.	"Full Moon"	4:30

== Personnel ==
Adapted from the Sapsucker liner notes.

Walking Timebombs

- Scott Ayers – guitar, electronics, sampler, tape, production, mastering
- Sarah Evans – vocals
- Frank Garymartin – drums
- Charlie Sanders Jr. – bass guitar

Production and additional personnel

- Mike Schneider – mastering, photography
- Tim Thomson – design

== Release history ==
Region	Date	Label	Format	Catalog
United States	2001	Anomie	CD	ANO14
