= Heroin Man =

Studio album by Cherubs
- Released: 1994
- Studio: Sweatbox Studio, Austin, TX
- Genre: Noise rock, post-hardcore, lo-fi
- Length: 50:22
- Label: Trance Syndicate

Cherubs chronology
Icing (1992)	Heroin Man (1994)	Short of Popular (1996)

Professional ratings
Review scores
Source	Rating
AllMusic	4.5/5 stars
Sputnikmusic	4.5/5 stars

Heroin Man is the second album by American noise rock band Cherubs, released in 1994 through Trance Syndicate. The album's title, cover, and lyrical themes were influenced by the death of Dave DeLuna, a very close friend of the band. The band broke up before the album's release, following a fight between drummer Brent Prager and bassist Owen McMahon after a live show. Over the years, it has gained a cult following within the American underground.

The band would eventually reunite in 2014, two whole decades after the release of Heroin Man. Amphetamine Reptile Records later reissued the album on CD and LP formats in July 2017, both editions featuring silk screened artwork done by Tom Hazelmyer.

== Track listing ==
All tracks are written by Cherubs.

No.	Title	Length
1.	"Stag Party"	3:14
2.	"Animator"	2:25
3.	"Blackhouse"	2:26
4.	"Baby Huey"	3:37
5.	"Dave of the Moon"	4:55
6.	"Coonass"	3:02
7.	"Mr. Goy"	3:10
8.	"Cockpit – Kiss the Shine"	4:16
9.	"Venus Flytrap"	2:03
10.	"The Big Groovy"	3:03
11.	"Wornout Balls"	5:14
12.	"Playdough"	3:30
13.	"Example Maiden Japan/Devil's Food"	9:27

== Personnel ==
Cherubs

- Owen McMahon – bass guitar, vocals
- Brent Prager – drums
- Kevin Whitley – guitar, vocals

== Release history ==
Region	Date	Label	Format	Catalog
United States	1994	Trance Syndicate	CD, LP	TR-24
United States	2017	Amphetamine Reptile Records	CD, LP	AmRep 114
