= Starfish (band) =

Dutch reggae rock band

StarFish is a Dutch reggae rock band that was formed in 2012, not to be confused with the English band formed in Yorkshire 1997 or the Austin TX band Starfish formed in 1993. Members include Mats Admiraal (a.k.a. the Admiral), Peter Schillemans, Thomas Wobben and Elmar Lambers, formerly of Punkrock band Translated.

The first two years were with drummer Kjeld Vonk who left in early 2014 when the band won several prices and started to play more often. That's where drummer Elmar joined the band after a break up with Translated. The lead singer is now an international fencing star.
