= Trance Syndicate =

- Founded: 1990
- Founder: King Coffey
- Defunct: 1999
- Status: Defunct
- Genre: Punk rock, alternative rock, noise rock, indie rock
- Country of origin: U.S.
- Location: Austin, Texas
- Official website: buttholesurfers.com/trance.html

Trance Syndicate was an independent record label founded in 1990 by King Coffey, drummer of Austin, Texas band the Butthole Surfers. Its first release was Crust's The Sacred Heart of Crust EP. From 1990 to 1999, when the label closed down, Trance Syndicate released albums by several notable Texan bands and artists, including Pain Teens, Bedhead, Ed Hall, American Analog Set, Furry Things, …And You Will Know Us by the Trail of Dead and Roky Erickson.

Although defunct, Trance Syndicate is survived by the Emperor Jones label, formerly an arm of Trance.

== Roster ==
- …And You Will Know Us by the Trail of Dead
- A.C. Acoustics
- Bedhead
- Butthole Surfers
- Cherubs
- Crunt
- Crust
- Desafinado
- Distorted Pony
- Drain
- Ed Hall
- Eight Frozen Modules
- Electric Company
- Furry Things
- johnboy
- Labradford
- Monroe Mustang
- The Pain Teens
- Paul Newman
- Roky Erickson
- Sixteen Deluxe
- Starfish
- Stars of the Lid
- Sweet Pea
- Windsor for the Derby

== Discography ==
No.	Year	Artist	Title	Format
01	1990	Crust	Sacred Heart of Crust	LP
02	1990	Various artists	Love & Napalm, Vol. 1	EP
03	1990	Pain Teens	Born in Blood	CD, CS, LP
04	1991	Drain	A Black Fist	7"
05	1991	Crust	Crust	LP
06	1991	Crust	Feelings	7"
07	1991	Ed Hall	Beth	7"
08	1991	Various artists	Love & Napalm, Vol. 2	EP
09	1991	Ed Hall	Gloryhole	CD, CS, LP
10	1992	Pain Teens	Stimulation Festival	CD, CS, LP
11	1992	Drain	Pick Up Heaven	CD, LP
12	1992	Cherubs	Pink Party Dessert	7"
13	1992	Cherubs	Icing	CD, LP
14	1992	Various artists	Love & Napalm	VHS
15	1993	Various artists	Love & Napalm	CD, CS, LP
16	1993	johnboy	pistolswing	CD, CS, LP
17	1993	Pain Teens	Destroy Me, Lover	CD, CS, LP
18	1993	Cherubs	Carjack Fairy / Daisy Poser	7"
19	1993	Crunt	Crunt	CD, CS, LP
20	1993	Ed Hall	Motherscratcher	CD, CS, LP
21	1993	Bedhead	WhatFunLifeWas	CD, CS, LP
22	1994	Distorted Pony	Instant Winner	CD, LP
23	1994	Crust	Crusty Love	CD, CS, LP
24	1994	Cherubs	Heroin Man	CD, LP
25	1994	Various artists	Jordan Thomas Nashville Connection	CD
26	1994	Cherubs / Fuckemos	Cherubs / Fuckemos	7"
27	1994	johnboy	Claim Dedications	CD, CS, LP
28	1994	Roky Erickson	We Are Never Talking / Please Judge	7"
29	1994	Bedhead	4songCDEP19:10	CD, CS, LP
30	1994	Butthole Surfers	Good King Wencenslaus	7"
31	1994	A.C. Acoustics	Able Treasury	CD
32	1994	Sixteen Deluxe	Idea / Honey	7"
33	1994	Roky Erickson	All That May Do My Rhyme	CD, CS, LP
34	1994	A.C. Acoustics	Hand Passes Plenty	CD, LP
35	1994	Butthole Surfers	The Hole Truth... and Nothing Butt	CD
36	1994	Ed Hall	La La Land	CD, LP
37	1995	Sixteen Deluxe	Backfeed Magnetbabe	CD, LP
38	1995	Various artists	¡Cinco Años!	CD
39	1995	Furry Things	Still California / Car Songs Unlimited	7"
40	1995	Starfish	Stellar Sonic Solutions	CD, CS, LP
41	1995	Pain Teens	Beast of Dreams	CD, CS, LP
42	1996	Bedhead	The Dark Ages	7"
43	1996	Furry Things	The Big Saturday Illusion	CD, LP
44	1996	Buffo	Here Our Cry	7"
45	1996	Windsor for the Derby / Desafinado	Earnest Powers / Envy The Big Noises	7"
46	1996	Windsor for the Derby	Calm Hades Float	CD, LP
47	1996	Drain	Drain	7"
48	1996	Cherubs	Short of Popular	CD
49	1996	Drain	Offspeed and In There	CD, LP
50	1996	Bedhead	Beheaded	CD, LP
51	1996	Sweet Pea	Chicks Hate Wes	CD
52	1997	Starfish	4-Song EP	7"
53	1997	Furry Things	Hedfones	CD
54	1997	Windsor for the Derby	Metropolitan Then Poland	EP
55	1997	Starfish	Frustrated	CD, LP
56	1998	Furry Things	Moments Away	CD
57	1997	Windsor for the Derby / Drain	The Kahanek Incident, Vol. 1	EP
58	1997	Electric Company / Furry Things	The Kahanek Incident, Vol. 2	EP
59	1997	Eight Frozen Modules	Daydream Nightmare	EP
60	1997	Labradford / Stars Of The Lid	The Kahanek Incident, Vol. 3	EP
61	1997	Starfish	The Instrumental	CD
62	1997	Eight Frozen Modules	The Confused Designer	CD
63	1997	Windsor for the Derby	Minnie Greutzfeldt	CD, LP
64	1997	Furry Things	Frequent Lunacy	CD
65	1998	Paul Newman	Frames Per Second	CD, LP
66	1998	...And You Will Know Us by the Trail of Dead	...And You Will Know Us by the Trail of Dead	CD, LP
67	1998	Bedhead	Transaction de Novo	CD, LP
68	1998	Monroe Mustang	Plain Sweeping Themes for the Unprepared	CD, LP
69	1999	Bedhead	Lepidoptera	7"
70	1999	Paul Newman	Only Love Can Break Your Heart	CD, LP

== See also ==
- List of record labels
