= Distorted Pony =

American noise rock band

- Origin: Los Angeles, California, United States
- Genres: Noise rock, industrial rock, punk rock
- Years active: 1986–1993; 2010–present
- Labels: Bomp!, Trance Syndicate
- Members: Theodore Jackson; Dora Jahr; London May; David Uskovich; Eddie Rivas
- Past members: Robert Hammer
- Website: distortedpony.com

Distorted Pony are an American noise rock band formed in Los Angeles in 1986. The band originally consisted of bass player Dora Jahr and guitarist David Uskovich accompanied by a drum machine. Eventually, they were joined by London May and Theodore Jackson on drums and percussion and Robert Hammer on guitar. The group broke up in late 1993, but they reunited in early 2010 and started to perform reunion shows.

== History ==
Distorted Pony formed in 1986 in Los Angeles, California with Dora Jahr on bass and David Uskovich on guitar. The band initially used a drum machine to handle percussion duties. In 1988, the duo recruited drummer Theodore Jackson and guitarist Robert Hammer. The group's first release was the "Concrete Bruises" 7" single, which was released in 1990 through Piece of Mind. The single was limited to only 1000 copies. In 1991, the band recruited drummer London May. After the release of extended plays and compilation appearances, the group released their debut album Punishment Room in 1992 through Bomp!. The album was recorded in January 1992 with the help of Steve Albini. The band recorded another album with Albini the following year before breaking up in August 1993. The album, titled Instant Winner, was released posthumously in 1994 through Trance Syndicate.

The band reunited in 2010 and began to perform reunion shows with Eddie Rivas of Los Angeles noise rock band Leopold. In the summer of 2018 Distorted Pony completed a 14 date tour of Europe. In 2020 they played the No Coast Fest in Dallas, TX along with a club show in Austin in the following night. On June 14, 2024 the band released the single "Crisis," their first new release in over 30 years.

== Band members ==
- David Uskovich – Guitar, Vocals (1986 –1993, 2010–present)
- Dora Jahr – Bass, Vocals (1986–1993, 2010–present)
- Eddie Rivas- Guitar, Vocals (2010–present)
- London May – Drums (1991–1993, 2010–present)
- Theodore Jackson – Drums (1988–1993, 2010–present)
- Robert Hammer – Guitar (1988–1993)

== Discography ==
Studio albums

- Punishment Room (1992, Bomp!)
- Instant Winner (1994, Trance Syndicate)

Live albums

- Live in Hamburg (2021, Improved Sequence)

EPs

- Concrete Bruises (1990, Piece of Mind)
- Work Makes Freedom (1991, Bomp!)
- Dept. of Existence/Go Kart (1993, Gasoline Boost)
- Concrete Bruises (remaster/reissue for 2018 European tour) (2018, Total Annihilation Records/Beauty Fool Records)

Compilation appearances

- Demolition Scare (1990, Demolition) – "Sinner's Prayer"
- The Big One (1991, Flipside) – "Jahr Null"
- HURT (1991, Braindrops) – "Scratch Out the Sky"
- Ow, Quit It! Vol. 1 (1992, Volvolo) – "Smittin"
- I Give You the Head of Corporate Rock and Roll Vol. 1 (1992, Pacifica Radio) – "Sinner's Prayer (Live)"
- The Smitten Love Song Compilation (1994, Karate) – "Insatiable Times"
- Destination: BOMP! (1994, Bomp!) – "HOD"
