= Icing (album) =

Studio album by Cherubs
- Released: 1992
- Studio: Smart, Madison, WI
- Genre: Noise rock
- Length: 35:42
- Label: Trance Syndicate
- Producer: Mr. Colson

Cherubs chronology
Icing (1992)	Heroin Man (1994)

Icing is the debut album by noise rock trio Cherubs, released in 1992 through Trance Syndicate. It was recorded at Smart Studios. The track "Pink Party Dessert" was released as a single on 7" vinyl and was played by John Peel on BBC Radio 1. The band released a remastered version of the album in 2023.

== Critical reception ==
Professional ratings
Review scores
Source	Rating
AllMusic	3/5 stars
Chicago Tribune	2.5/4 stars

The Chicago Tribune wrote: "Almost consistently a mid-tempo project, Icing never accelerates to the cathartic pace typical of a thrash band." The San Antonio Express-News deemed the band "something of an underground supergroup ... whose ultra-heavy sound has been compared to everyone from Black Sabbath to Flipper to the Melvins".

== Track listing ==
All tracks are written by Cherubs.

No.	Title	Length
1.	"Sugary"	3:06
2.	"All Chickened Out"	3:18
3.	"Half a Rat"	3:46
4.	"Come"	3:02
5.	"Ginger Upper"	4:02
6.	"Fed"	4:00
7.	"Shoofly"	3:03
8.	"Pink Party Dessert"	3:37
9.	"Vicki's Retreat"	3:38
10.	"Kick Me"	4:10

== Personnel ==
Cherubs

- Owen McMahon – bass guitar, vocals
- Brent Prager – drums
- Kevin Whitley – guitar, vocals

Production and additional personnel

- Mr. Colson – production, engineering, recording

== Release history ==
Region	Date	Label	Format	Catalog
United States	1992	Trance Syndicate	CD, LP	TR-13
