= Ed Hall (band) =

American noise rock band formed in 1985

- Origin: Austin, Texas, US
- Genres: Noise rock, post-hardcore, psychedelic rock
- Years active: 1985 – 1996
- Labels: Boner, Trance Syndicate
- Past members: John Buron; Gary Chester; Andy Colvin; Lyman Hardy; Larry Strub; Kevin Whitley

Ed Hall was a noise rock band formed in Austin, Texas, United States in 1985. The band played a mix of post-hardcore and psychedelic rock and was described by Trouser Press as "Austin's resident heirs to the Butthole Surfers' weird-rock crown". Ed Hall was a trio not containing any member of that name; Gary Chester handled guitar duties, with Larry Strub on bass. Drumming on the band's first two albums was handled by Kevin Whitley, who was replaced by Lyman Hardy until the group dissolved.

== History ==
=== Early years (1985–1988) ===
Ed Hall was founded in 1985 by John Buron, Gary Chester, Andy Colvin and Larry Strub. Larry Strub had moved to Austin in the early eighties to attend the University of Texas where he met drummer John Buron, who was interested in starting a band. At his advice, Strub began learning to play bass guitar. Gary Chester took botany classes with Strub and was offered to join the duo. The band was named as such after Buron created a character named Ed Hall in a game of Exquisite Corpse. "John thought Ed Hall was a great name because it was totally opposite of the Butthole Surfers, Scratch Acid, or the Dead Kennedys," explains Chester. "It was just this totally banal, generic name."

The band began performing during Art Student's Association gatherings at UT before switching to playing at the local Dong Huong Vietnamese restaurant on North Loop, which also served as a live platform for other local punk groups such as the Pocket FishRmen, ST-37, and Thanatopsis. The location was known for their willingness to support esoteric and cult performers and the live compilation The Polyp Explodes, which featured Ed Hall was released locally. The compilation was brought to the attention of Tom Flynn at Boner Records, a Berkley-based label known for issuing esoteric underground groups. Upon hearing Ed Hall, Flynn contacted the band and offered them five hundred dollars to record their debut album. Andy Colvin, who had served as the group's lead vocalist up until that point, departed from the band for personal reasons. Recordings Ed Hall made with Colvin appeared on Charlie Manson Street, a 1989 compilation album comprising Colvin's work with multiple bands including Interdimensional Vortex League.

=== Boner records albums (1988–1991) ===
After releasing six songs on the Mind Drum Records compilation Charlie Manson Street, debut album Albert was released on the Boner label in 1988. Standout track "Candy House" was a taste of things to come on 1990s similarly bizarre and humorous Love Poke Here. The band was subsequently featured in Richard Linklater's 1991 indie film Slacker and signed a contract with Butthole Surfer King Coffey's Trance Syndicate label and toured North America as the Butthole Surfers' support act.

=== Trance Syndicate albums (1991–1996) ===
With each song named after an individual that may or may not have ever existed, 1992's Trance Syndicate debut Gloryhole marked a change in the band's sound, whilst retaining much in the style of its two predecessors: open, loose backbeats overlaid with pop song structures, and Butthole Surfers-esque influence. Production changed following the move to Butch Vig's Smart Studios, and highlights included "Buster Enamel" and the Jakob-like instrumental "Bernie Sticky", along with a cello-driven cover of Kiss's "Beth" (also released as a 7-inch single on Trance Syndicate)

1993's Motherscratcher opening track "White House Girls", with its exaggerated backbeat and laughing chorus, employs prickly riffs and trebly, note-driven leads of guitarist Gary Chester, with bass player Larry Strub and new drummer Lyman Hardy, who replaced Kevin Whitley prior to the Gloryhole tour. Influences also include Flipper, and with whom they toured in 1994.

Ed Hall's fifth album, 1995's La La Land was an extension of the ground covered on Motherscratcher .

=== Breakup and post-breakup activities (1996–present) ===
Their sixth album, Permission to Rock... Denied was completed but never officially released. In a March 2013 interview with online music zine Punk Globe, Strub commented on the record stating, "You could still tell it was us, but different."

Ed Hall split in 1996. Bassist Strub moved to Thailand and taught English for some years. Gary Chester spent time in Moist Fist and Gold (which was just Pong), and Lyman Hardy played in a number of bands, including the Goin' Along Feelin' Just Fines. All three now play in retro-futuristic cosmic dance-rock combo Pong. A reunion show in Austin, Texas in 2003 featured Chester, Strubb, Hardy, and Whitley, with Whitley and Hardy sharing drum duties. A reunion show (with Crust and Pain Teens) happened in November 2012. Another show in Austin took place on July 19, 2014. Ed Hall played a double-bill with Pong at Fred's Texas Cafe in Fort Worth, TX on August 2, 2014.

=== Andy Colvin & Ed Hall (2015) ===
In 2015 using the appellation "Andy Colvin & Ed Hall" vocalist Andy Colvin released hundreds of outtakes, b-sides, and alternate versions of material recorded during Ed Hall's early years.

=== Ed Hall: The Unauthorized Story ===
On September 28, 2017, the Local Sightings Film Festival in Seattle premiered the short documentary film titled Ed Hall: The Unauthorized Story (2016) which was directed by Benjamin Camp and produced by Andy Colvin.

== Band members ==
Final line-up

- Gary Chester – electric guitar (1985–1996), vocals (1987–1996)
- Lyman Hardy – drums (1991–1996)
- Larry Strub – bass guitar (1985–1996), vocals (1987–1996)

Former members

- John Buron – drums (1985)
- Andy Colvin – vocals (1985–1987)
- Kevin Whitley – drums (1985–1991)

Timeline

== Discography ==
Studio albums

- Albert (1988, Boner)
- Love Poke Here (1990, Boner)
- Gloryhole (1991, Trance Syndicate)
- Motherscratcher (1993, Trance Syndicate)
- La La Land (1995, Trance Syndicate)
- Permission to Rock... Denied (1996, Unreleased)

Singles

- "Deth" (1991, Trance Syndicate)

Compilations appearances

- The Polyp Explodes (1988, Deadline)
- Charlie Manson Street Comp (1988, Mind Drum)
- Love and Napalm Volume 1 (1990, Trance Syndicate)
- Love and Napalm Volume 2 (1991, Trance Syndicate)
- Love and Napalm, The Album (1993, Trance Syndicate)
- ¡Cinco Años! (1995, Trance Syndicate)
