= Dark Castle (band) =

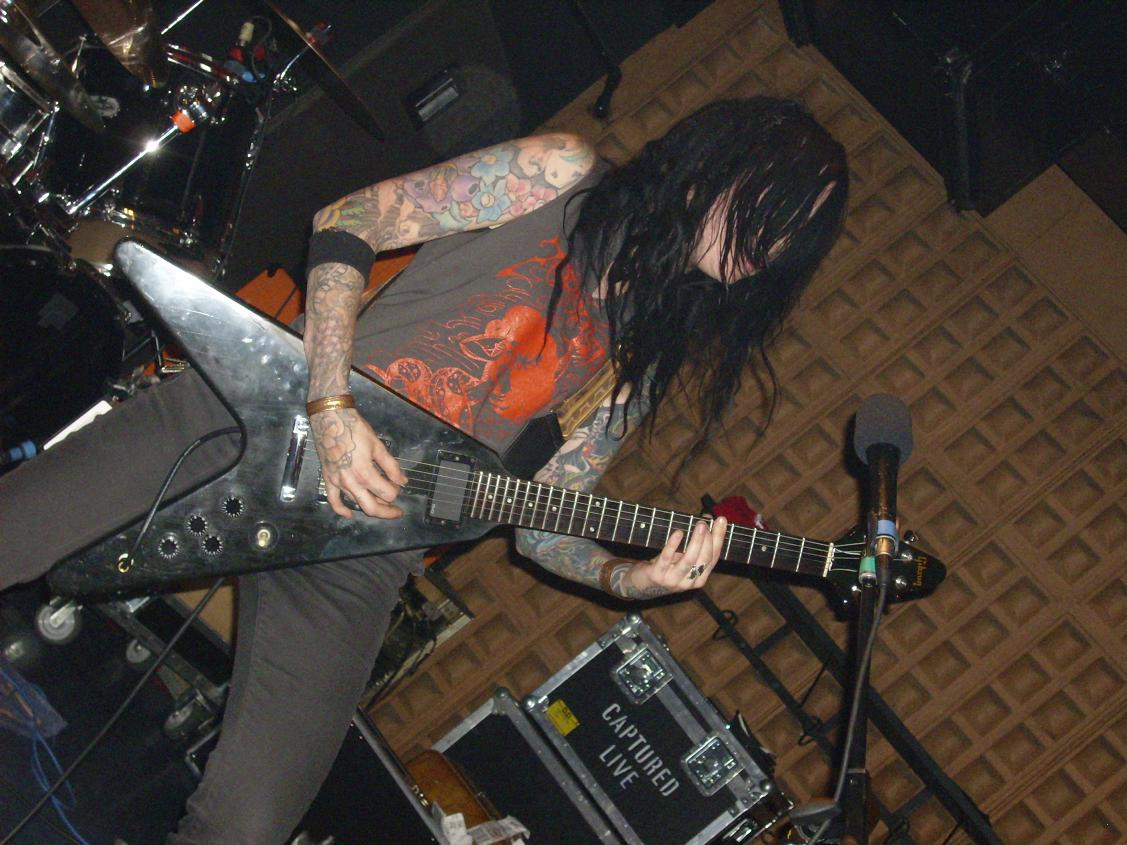
- Stevie Floyd in 2010

Background information
- Origin: St. Augustine, Florida
- Genre: Doom metal
- Years active: 2005–present
- Labels: Profound Lore, At A Loss
- Members: Stevie Floyd; Rob Shaffer

Dark Castle is an American doom metal band formed by guitarist–vocalist Stevie Floyd and drummer–vocalist Rob Shaffer in 2005. They released their first full-length album, Spirited Migration, in 2009.

== Discography ==
=== Studio albums ===
- Spirited Migration (At A Loss Recordings, 2009)
- Surrender to All Life Beyond Form (Profound Lore Records, 2011)

=== EPs ===
- Flight of Pegasus (self-released, 2007)
