= Albert (Ed Hall album) =

Studio album by Ed Hall
- Released: 1988
- Genre: Noise rock, post-hardcore
- Length: 38:48
- Label: Boner
- Producer: Brian Beattie

Ed Hall chronology
Albert (1988)	Love Poke Here (1990)

Professional ratings
Review scores
Source	Rating
Allmusic	2/5 stars

Albert is the debut studio album of the Texas noise rock band Ed Hall, released in 1988 by Boner Records. The album takes its name from Albert Leblanc, the artist who drew the illustrations for the record sleeve and booklet.

== Track listing ==
All tracks are written by Gary Chester, Larry Strub and Kevin Whitley.

Side one
No.	Title	Length
1.	"Cracked"	2:32
2.	"Candy House"	3:42
3.	"Ubermansch"	1:33
4.	"Dirt"	3:10
5.	"Sedrick"	2:02
6.	"Bowling"	3:23
7.	"Babies"	3:52
8.	"Who's Ed?"	4:10
9.	"Geniritalia"	2:02
10.	"Reading"	3:34
11.	"Poo Poo"	2:34
12.	"Jungle Labototany"	4:33
13.	"Ball Dirt Cookie"	2:07

== Personnel ==
Adapted from the Albert liner notes.

Ed Hall

- Gary Chester – electric guitar, vocals
- Larry Strub – bass guitar, vocals
- Kevin Whitley – drums, vocals

Production and additional personnel

- Brian Beattie – production, bagpipes (1), accordion (7)
- Albert Leblanc – illustrations
- Mike Stewart – engineering

== Release history ==
Region	Date	Label	Format	Catalog
United States	1988	Boner	CD, CS, LP	BR12
