= Cherubs (American band) =

American noise rock band

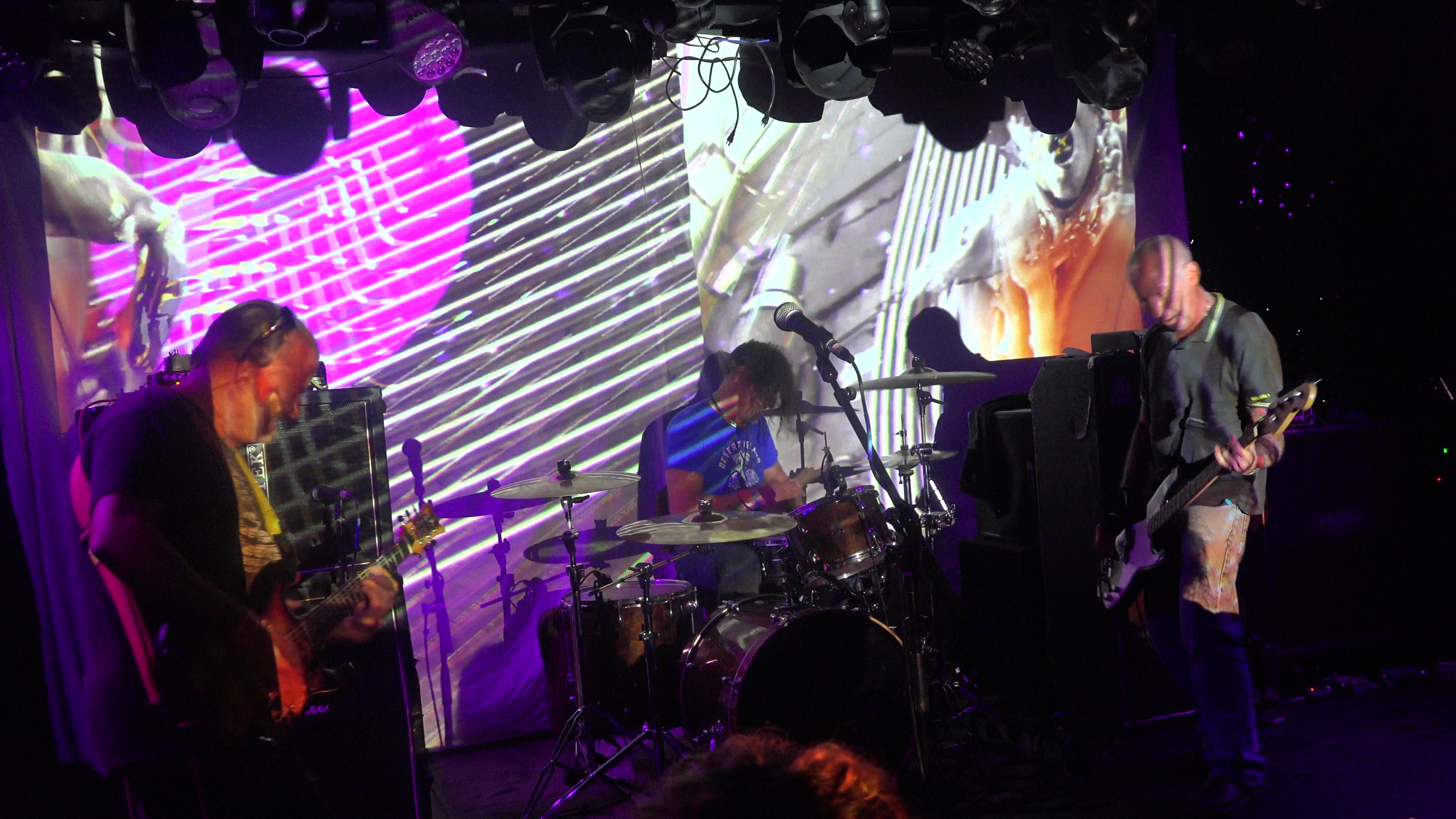
- in 2025 in at TV Eye in Brooklyn

Background information
- Origin: Austin, Texas, US
- Genres: Noise rock, post-hardcore, alternative metal
- Years active: 1991–1994, 2014–present
- Labels: Trance Syndicate, Brutal Panda, Relapse Records
- Members: Pete Shore; Kevin Whitley; Brent Prager
- Past members: Owen McMahon

Cherubs are an American noise rock band from Austin, Texas, formed in 1991. Their line up consisted of guitarist Kevin Whitley, bassist Owen McMahon, and drummer Brent Prager. During their initial run, they released two albums and an outtake compilation, all of which were released through Trance Syndicate. They broke up in 1994, shortly before the release of their second album Heroin Man. They reunited in 2014 and a third full-length, titled 2 YNFYNYTY, was released on March 3, 2015, through Brutal Panda Records. A second reunion album, titled Immaculada High, was issued through Relapse Records on July 26, 2019.

== History ==
Cherubs were formed in 1991 by Kevin Whitley (former Ed Hall drummer), Owen McMahon, and Brent Prager. In early 1992, they were signed through Trance Syndicate, an independent record label owned by King Coffey of The Butthole Surfers, before they even performed their first live show. That same year they released their debut album Icing. The album's lead single, "Pink Party Dessert", was released as a single on 7-inch vinyl, which was even played through BBC Radio 1 by disc jockey John Peel. Their follow-up record, Heroin Man, was released two years later. The album's title and lyrical themes were influenced by the heroin-induced overdose of Dave DeLuna, a very close friend of the band. The band broke up before the album's release, following a fight between Prager and McMahon after a live show. In 1996, Trance Syndicate released Short of Popular, a compilation album that was made up of b-sides, rarities, and outtakes recorded throughout the band's brief run. According to Drummer Brent Prager the band were in talks with A&M records prior to splitting up, this is likely due to the “next Nirvana” craze of 90s following the commercial success of the Seattle Grunge movement.

In 2013, a compilation titled Everyone's Dead Before They Leave: A Tribute to the Cherubs was released through Unfortunate Miracle Records, which compiles various covers of songs by the Cherubs done by many different bands. The title is a reference to a lyric from "Pink Party Dessert". In 2014, the Cherubs reunited and began recording a new album over the summer. 2 YNFYNYTY was released by Brutal Panda Records in March 2015. The extended play Fist In The Air was released on double 7-inch vinyl in February 2016, and in August of the same year the band played their first live show in over 20 years, at Beerland. They later performed at the Mohawk's 10th anniversary celebration the following month. Also in 2016, Tom Hazelmyer of Amphetamine Reptile Records released a limited edition split 7-inch lathe cut that featured the Cherubs and Gay Witch Abortion, in conjunction with Hazelmyer's Ink Obscene Archaic Gutter Memes art show held at Leona Gallery in Austin, Texas in December.

In November 2018, the group signed onto metal-based label Relapse Records for future releases. Short of Popular also received reissue treatment through Sonic Surgery Records on CD and LP formats. The trios fourth studio album, titled Immaculada High, was issued through the label on July 26, 2019.

== Members ==
Current

- Kevin Whitley – guitar, vocals
- Pete Shore – bass
- Brent Prager – drums

Former

- Owen McMahon – bass, vocals

== Discography ==
=== Studio albums ===
- Icing (1992)
- Heroin Man (1994)
- 2 YNFYNYTY (2015)
- Immaculada High (2019)

=== Compilation albums ===
- Short of Popular (1996)

=== Extended plays ===
- Fist In The Air (2016)
- SLO BLO 4 FRNZ & SXY (2021)

=== Singles ===
- "Pink Party Dessert" (1992)
- "Carjack Fairy/Daisy Poser" (1993)
- "Dreamin'" (1993)
- "Sooey Pig" (2019)

=== Split Singles ===
- "Pink Party Dessert/Hambone City" (1993, split with Slug)
- "Do You Wanna Dance?/Shoofly" (1994, split with Fuckemos)
- "I Want Candy/Do You Wanna Dance?" (1996, split with Fuckemos)
- Ink Obscene Archaic Gutter Memes (2016, split with Gay Witch Abortion)

=== Compilation Appearances ===
- Love & Napalm (1993) - "Spitwad", "Dovey"
- Chairman of the Board - Interpretations of Songs Made Famous By Frank Sinatra (1993) - "How Little We Know"
- The Smitten Love Song Compilation (1994) - "I Want Candy"
- Live at Emo's (1994) - "All Chickened Out"
- ¡Cinco Años! (1995) - "Quitter", "Carjack Fairy"
- The Beginning of the End Again (1995) - "Dreaming"
- American Noise Vol. 2 (2019) - "Shoofly"
