= Windsor for the Derby =

American post-rock band

- Origin: Tampa, Florida
- Genres: Indie rock, post-rock, folk, ambient, experimental rock
- Years active: 1995–present
- Labels: Secretly Canadian, Aesthetics, Young God Records, Trance Syndicate
- Members: Jason McNeely; Dan Matz; Greg Anderson; Adam Wiltzie; Karl Bauer; Charlie Hall
- Past members: Christian Goyer; Tim White; Ben Cissner; Alan Schaefer; Gianmarco Cilli; Adam Granduciel; Cliff White; Erik O'Brian

Windsor for the Derby are an American post-rock band formed in Tampa, Florida, in 1995 and currently based in Austin, Texas. Since their formation, the group has released many albums through labels such as Trance Syndicate, Young God Records, and most recently on Secretly Canadian, and has maintained a revolving door line-up, with founding members Dan Matz and Jason McNeely acting as the band's core.

== Discography ==
=== Albums ===
- Calm Hades Float (1996, Trance Syndicate)
- Minnie Greutzfeldt (1997, Trance Syndicate)
- Difference and Repetition (1999, Young God Records)
- The Emotional Rescue (2002, Aesthetic Records)
- Earnest Powers (2002, Emperor Jones Records)
- We Fight Til Death (2004, Secretly Canadian)
- Giving Up the Ghost (2005, Secretly Canadian)
- How We Lost (2007, Secretly Canadian)
- Against Love (2010, Secretly Canadian)

=== Soundtrack appearances ===
- "The Melody Of A Fallen Tree" (Marie Antoinette (soundtrack))
- "Forgotten" (I Am Zozo)

=== Singles and EPs ===
- Live at the Blue Flamingo (1995, Golden Hour Records)
- Windsor for the Derby/Desafinado split single (1995, Trance Syndicate)
- Metropolitan Then Poland EP (1997, Trance Syndicate)
- The Kahanek Incident - Volume 1 Windsor for the Derby/Drain split 12-inch (1997, Trance Syndicate)
- Stars of the Lid/Windsor for the Derby split 7-inch (1998, 33 Degrees)
- Fangface split 7-inch (1998, Pehr)
- Now I Know the Sea 7-inch (1999, Western Vinyl)
- Melt Close 7-inch (2000, Speakerphone Recordings)
- The Emotional Rescue EP (2001, Holophonor)
- The Awkwardness EP (2001, Aesthetics)
- Empathy for People Unknown 12-inch (2005, Secretly Canadian)
- Highway Kind compilation (2006, Emoragei Magazine Je T'Aime)
- Speaker Special 7-inch (2012, Geographic North)

== See also ==
- What We Did
