= Crust (band) =

- Origin: Austin, Texas
- Years active: 1987–1997
- Label: Trance Syndicate Records

Crust was a musical group from Austin, Texas that was active during the late-1980s and 1990s and was featured on Trance Syndicate Records, a record label run by King Coffey from the Butthole Surfers. The group's members were John Hawkins (vocals and misc.), Jerry Page (bass and misc.), and Richard Smith (percussion and misc.).

== History ==
John Hawkins, Jerry Page, and Richard Smith formed the group in 1987. Shortly after its formation, the trio (as "Mud Honey") organized and released a compilation cassette, The Polyp Explodes. Along with Crust, the cassette featured the Austin bands Miracle Room, Ed Hall, ST37, Seemen, and Thanatopsis Throne. The band's early instrumentation included tape loops, feedback devices, spring reverberators, and drum machines, but later incorporated traditional rock instruments such as drum kit, electric guitar, bass and keyboard.

The band embarked on a concert tour of the West Coast in December 1989. Crust achieved some notoriety for their stage antics, which frequently included live earthworms, fresh beef tongues, nudity, and fire.

On Good Friday, 1990, Trance Syndicate released Crust's first EP, Sacred Heart of Crust; it was the first release from the record label. The trio toured the East Coast of the United States and Canada; songs such as "Head Lice" emerged from the group's travel experiences. Trance Syndicate released the band's first full-length album, Crust in 1991, followed by a second album, Crusty Love in 1994. The band continued to tour, but scaled back its live performances following a series of mishaps (including one in which John Hawkins was stabbed), finally disbanding after an appearance at the 1997 SXSW festival. The band performed a reunion show to a sold-out crowd at Room 710 on May 22, 2004 in Austin.

(Reading from a Southern Records press release): '"For years now, Crust have been one of the most challenging bands in Texas" (I can believe that), "banging on drums, electric door springs and samplers. They've consistently drawn the attention of the arbiters of moral decency. At a recent show, when John's adult diaper fell down, a diaper that he'd previously pulled live worms out of, the police were prepared to cart him off to jail for indecency, but backstage they were dismayed when John courteously displayed his duct tape covered genitalia, legally keeping him within the local moral limits." Well, that's nice to know, but nevertheless, I think I shall withdraw the invitation to them to come along to a wine and cheese party in our village to raise funds for the church roof.'" - John Peel (Oct, 27 1991)

Bass guitarist Jerry Page died on November, 27th 2024.

== Discography ==
- 1990: Sacred Heart of Crust (EP)
- 1991: Crust
- 1994: Crusty Love
- 1999: Food Eater (Self-Released)
