= Chris "Frenchie" Smith =

American record producer

Background information
- Origin: Durant, Oklahoma, U.S.
- Website: Discography

Chris "Frenchie" Smith (born in Durant, Oklahoma) is an American record producer, guitarist and songwriter.

== Biography ==
Smith first began as a guitar player in the Austin, Texas noise-pop band Sixteen Deluxe in 1994. The band signed with Warner Bros. in 1996. After Sixteen Deluxe disbanded in 2000, Smith formed Young Heart Attack in 2001 with Steven Hall and Joey Shuffield from Fastball. Young Heart Attack signed with XL Recordings in 2003 and released their debut album Mouthful of Love in 2004. The band did several tours with Motörhead, the Darkness, and Peaches.

Production took more of Smith's focus as time went on and he co-owns The Bubble Recording studio in Austin.

Smith has produced records for many notable acts including ...And You Will Know Us by the Trail of Dead, Meat Puppets, the Toadies, Gregg Rolie, the Answer, Built to Spill, Jet and Graveltooth. In 2007, Smith was nominated for a Grammy for 'Best Zydeco or Cajun Album' for his work on the Lost Bayou Ramblers album Live: A La Blue Moon.

Smith was chosen to speak at the 2009 SXSW Producer Panel convention with other record producers.

== Productions and mixing ==
The following are notable artists Smith has produced for:

- ...And You Will Know Us by the Trail of Dead
- The Answer
- Gregg Rolie
- The Darkness
- The Silent Comedy
- Helios Creed
- Jet
- The Dandies
- The Datsuns
- Lost Bayou Ramblers
- Meat Puppets
- Ringo Deathstarr
- Scorpion Child
- The Boxing Lesson
- Young Heart Attack
- Lions
- Residual Kid
- The Front Bottoms
- Wild Child
- The Art
- Trashy Annie
