= Bliss Blood =

American singer-songwriter

- Born: Omaha, Nebraska, U.S.
- Occupations: Singer-songwriter, musician
- Instruments: Vocals, ukulele
- Years active: 1988–present
- Website: Official Webpage at the Wayback Machine (archived March 29, 2018)

Bliss Blood is an American musician and songwriter. She has written and recorded two albums with virtuoso guitarist Al Street, five albums with New York jazz band The Moonlighters from 2000 to 2009, and six albums from 1988 to 1995 with Houston noise rock band Pain Teens. She has also recorded with the Melvins and many other groups.

== Current projects ==
Bliss Blood is primarily a songwriter who began her career in 1988 in Houston, Texas psychedelic noise rock group Pain Teens, she currently writes songs and plays ukulele in the 1920s and 1930s jazz-themed New York City group The Moonlighters, formed in 1998. She writes original songs, rare in the "retro jazz" genre, and The Moonlighters released four CDs on their own label, Onliest Records, toured Germany four times, in 2002, 2006, 2007 and 2009, and released their fifth CD, "Enchanted", on WorldSound Records in 2009. The current lineup of the band includes actress/singer/screenwriter Cindy Ball on vocals and guitar, John Pinella on steel guitar, Rus Wimbish on acoustic bass, Al Street on guitar, and Jim Fryer on horns.

She also collaborates with guitarist Al Street. In 2015 they released their third cd, 14 unoriginal songs, titled "Unspun" on Bliss' Onliest Records label. They have previously released two CDs, Evanescent (10 original songs) and Live on the Lilac (17 cover tunes). They had two original songs featured in the independent New York City film Hello Lonesome, directed by Adam Reid, released May 27, 2011.

The Independent Shakespeare Company headed by actor David Melville performed Bliss Blood's original songs onstage in their August 2012 staging of A Comedy of Errors.
