= Henry Cromwell (disambiguation) =

Henry Cromwell (1628–1674) was son of Lord Protector Oliver Cromwell and served as Lord Deputy of Ireland.

Henry Cromwell may also refer to:

- Henry Cromwell, 2nd Baron Cromwell (1538–1592), English peer
- Sir Henry Williams (alias Cromwell) (1537–1604), member of parliament for Huntingdonshire
- Henry Cromwell (alias Williams) (c.1566–1630), member of parliament for Huntingdon
- Henry Cromwell-Williams (1625–1673), member of parliament for Huntingdonshire
