= Freckenham =

Village in Suffolk, England

Coordinates: 52.3167°N 0.433°E

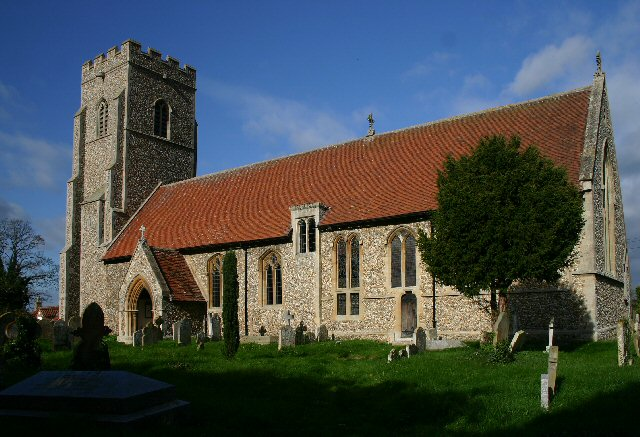
- St Andrew's Church, Freckenham

- Location within Suffolk
- Population: 344 (2011)
- OS grid reference: TL664720
- District: West Suffolk
- Shire county: Suffolk
- Region: East
- Country: England
- Sovereign state: United Kingdom
- Post town: Bury St Edmunds
- Postcode district: IP28
- Dialling code: 01638
- UK Parliament: West Suffolk

Freckenham is a small rural village and civil parish in the West Suffolk district of Suffolk in East Anglia, in the country of England.

Geographically, it is relatively flat and has the River Kennet, a tributary of the River Lark locally known as the Lee Brook, cutting through the centre of the village. The parish's boundary forms, on its west and south sides, the boundary between Cambridgeshire and Suffolk.

The village's name is listed as "Frekeham" in 895, and appears in the Domesday Book of 1086 as "Frakenaham". The name is believed to mean "homestead of a man called Freca", or derive from frecena a Saxon word meaning "the home of strong men or warriors".

== History ==
The parish of Freckenham has been inhabited since Neolithic times; a flint axe was unearthed in the village in 1884. With fens on three sides, early residents completed their defense by raising earthworks that are believed to have originally reached perhaps twenty feet in height. The remains can still be found in the field by the church, and Beacon Mound that was used to relay messages in medieval times was added as part of them in c.14th century.

The hoard of around 90 Iron Age gold coins dating from about AD 20 that was found in the area of Mortimer's Lane suggests that the village lay within the territory of the Iceni tribe. Many of these well-preserved coins are now housed in the British Museum. It is probable that Romans also occupied the area, and the celebrated Mildenhall Treasure were found only a few miles away. During the Dark Ages the village may well have witnessed any of the many Saxon raids on the region and may be the origin of the many bones buried near the church.

The first written record of the village dates from 896 when Alfred the Great gave "Freckenham in the County of Suffolk and my small estate in Yselham (Isleham)" to Burricus, Bishop of Rochester. In the tenth century the conquering Vikings sold the village, but it was restored to Rochester only to be lost again when Sweyn Forkbeard invaded and is believed to have destroyed the village's castle, of which only the motte mound remains. When the Vikings were finally expelled in 1046 the parish passed to Harold Godwinson and in 1066 to Odo of Bayeux brother of William the Conqueror.

When Odo fell from favour, the village once again became the property of the Bishop of Rochester and remained in his property with only minor interruptions until in 1537, it was sold to Sir Ralph Warren, twice Lord Mayor of London.

The draining of The Fens in the late 17th century radically changed the region, removing the fishing industry that dominated the area. The village folk thus turned their attention to farming the newly drained land and the primary industry has been arable farming in the centuries since.

== Church ==
It is likely that a place of Christian worship has existed on the site of the present church since the third century, though no archaeological trace remains. Work on the present church began in around 1195 and the chancel dates from this time. The nave was added in the 14th century, and a tower was built in around 1475, though largely collapsed in 1882, being restored soon after in its original style. The original thatched roof was tiled in 1866.

The carved pew ends are noted and there is an alabaster plaque dedicated to Saint Eloi a patron saint of blacksmiths. The five bells date from between 1623 and 1809. The church is dedicated to Saint Andrew, and has been in the patronage of Peterhouse, Cambridge since 1760, the college's first.

There is also a 1281 reference to the "Chappell of the Blessed Mary", indicating that the village was of sufficient size to merit a second place of worship.

== Village life ==
Due to a low population it contains limited facilities, but these include a 16th-century pub, The Golden Boar, a church, and a village hall. Children in the area attend schools in neighbouring villages and towns.

== Lords of the Manor ==
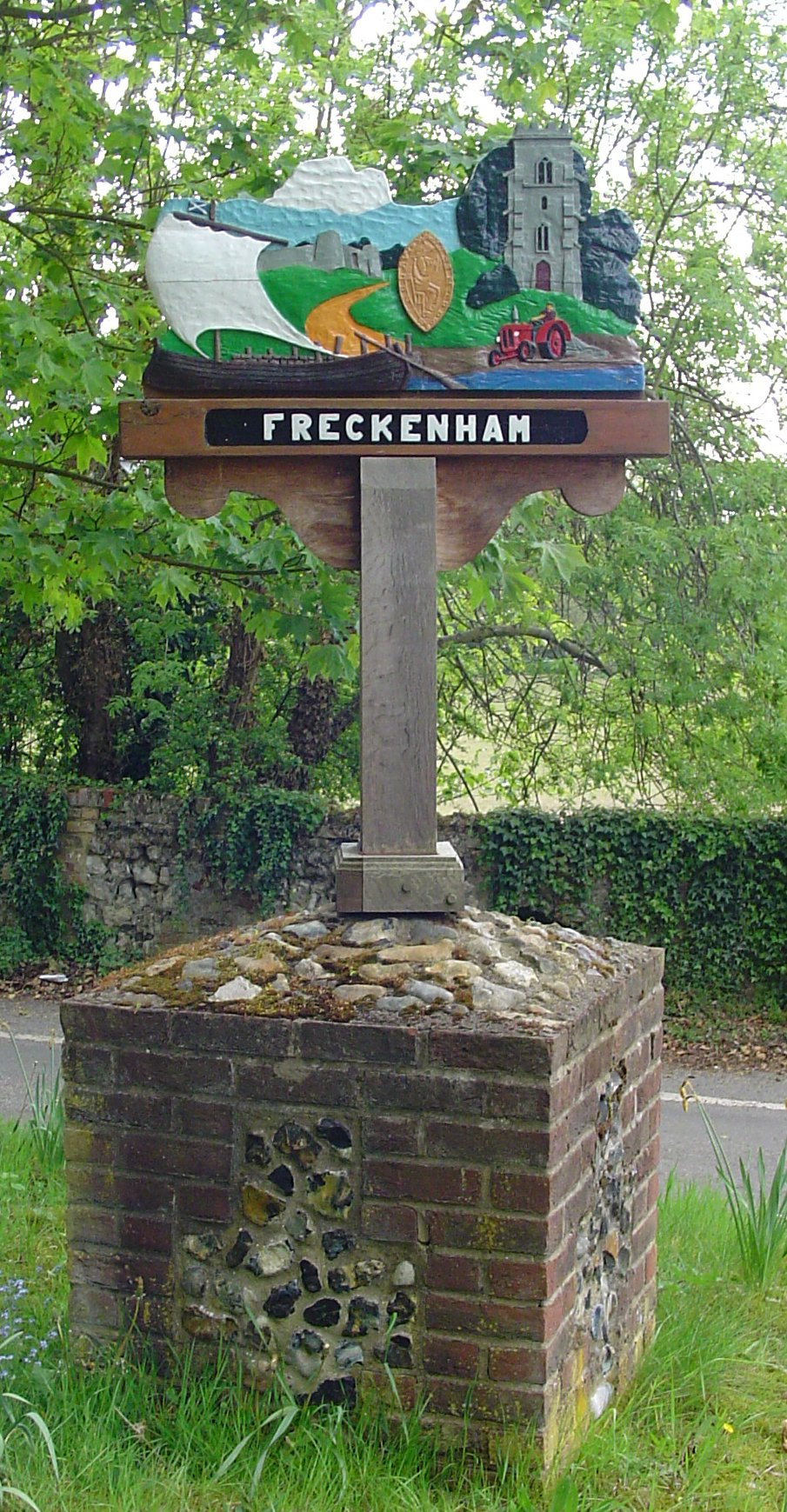
Village sign in Freckenham

The Bishops of Rochester have been Lords of the Manor from the time King Alfred gave the property to Burricus. In 1537, Bishop John conveyed the manor to Sir Ralph Warren and his wife Christina. Sir Ralph was Lord Mayor of London and he appointed Edward Crome and Nicholas Wilson as his Trustees. Joan, daughter to Sir Ralph, married Sir Henry Cromwell. His son and heir, Sir Oliver Cromwell, alienated the manor in 1600 to Sir Stephen Soame. He died in 1619 and was succeeded by his son Sir Thomas Soame. Sir Thomas, who was knighted by King Charles I of England in 1641, had been Sheriff of London in 1635, and MP briefly in the Short Parliament (April–May 1640), and then in the Long Parliament from 1641. He was Alderman for Ventry and then of Cheap from 1640 to 1651, when he was deprived by the republican government. He was reinstated in 1660 on the Restoration of King Charles II of England. He died in 1670, aged 88.

The manor appears to have devolved on his two daughters (?) Bridget, married to Robert Russell of Freckenham, and Cicely, who re-married as her second husband Thomas Cage. She conveyed her share of the Lordship to her brother-in-law Robert Russell. Meanwhile, she directed her executors to give £500 to her son, Seckford Cage. The law then was that a wife's property became her husband's on their marriage and, consequently, Thomas Cage refused to make the transfer. Seckford Cage took his father to Chancery Division and sued him for the money, which was granted by the Court in 1680.

Robert Russell sold the manor to Sir Samuel Clarke, who was created a Baronet in 1698. He came from Snailwell, Cambridgeshire, and married Mary, daughter of Major Robert Thompson, of Newington Green, Middlesex (North London). Sir Samuel died in 1719. He was succeeded at Freckenham by his son, Sir Robert, 2nd Baronet who represented Cambridge in Parliament in 1717. A younger son Samuel died in his father's lifetime, but there were three daughters, Mary, the third, being important for our descent of the Lordship. She married Arthur Barnardiston, youngest son of Sir Nathaniel Barnardiston, 23rd in lineal descent of his family. Sir Robert died in 1746, and was succeeded as 3rd Baronet by his son, Sir Samuel Clarke, who died in 1753. The Baronetcy and the Lordship passed to his brother, Sir Robert, who died in 1770. The last in the male line of the Clarkes was Sir Arthur, the 6th Baronet, who died in 1806 without issue. At this point, the entail of the 2nd Baronet's Will came into action again and the Lordship of Freckenham became the property of Nathaniel Barnardiston, the son of Arthur Barnardiston and Mary Clarke.

Since that time the Barnardiston Family have owned the Manor passing it to rightful heirs for more than two centuries until recently, when Nathaniel Geoffrey Barnardiston, great great nephew of Major-General Nathaniel Walter Barnardiston, Commander in the Siege of Tsingtao, and son of Colonel Nathaniel Montague Barnardiston passed the Lordship to Datu Sadja Matthew Pajares Yngson, GCPS KCR FRSA, from Dominica and the Philippines, who is a Commercial Diplomat and ambassador and secretary-general of the Sultanate of Sulu. He is the first Lord of non-English descent.
