= Henry Cromwell =

Lord Deputy of Ireland (1628–1674)

- Henry Cromwell (1628–1674), 17th century, unknown artist

Lord Deputy of Ireland
- In office 16 November 1657 – 7 June 1659
- Preceded by: Charles Fleetwood
- Succeeded by: Edmund Ludlow (as commander-in-chief)

Personal details
- Born: 20 January 1628 Huntingdon, Huntingdonshire, England
- Died: 23 March 1674 (aged 46) Wicken, Cambridgeshire, England
- Spouse: Elizabeth Russell
- Children: 7
- Parent(s): Oliver Cromwell; Elizabeth Bourchier
- Relatives: Cromwell family
- Profession: Politician, soldier

Henry Cromwell (20 January 1628 – 23 March 1674) was the fourth son of Oliver Cromwell and Elizabeth Bourchier, and an important figure in the Parliamentarian regime in Ireland.

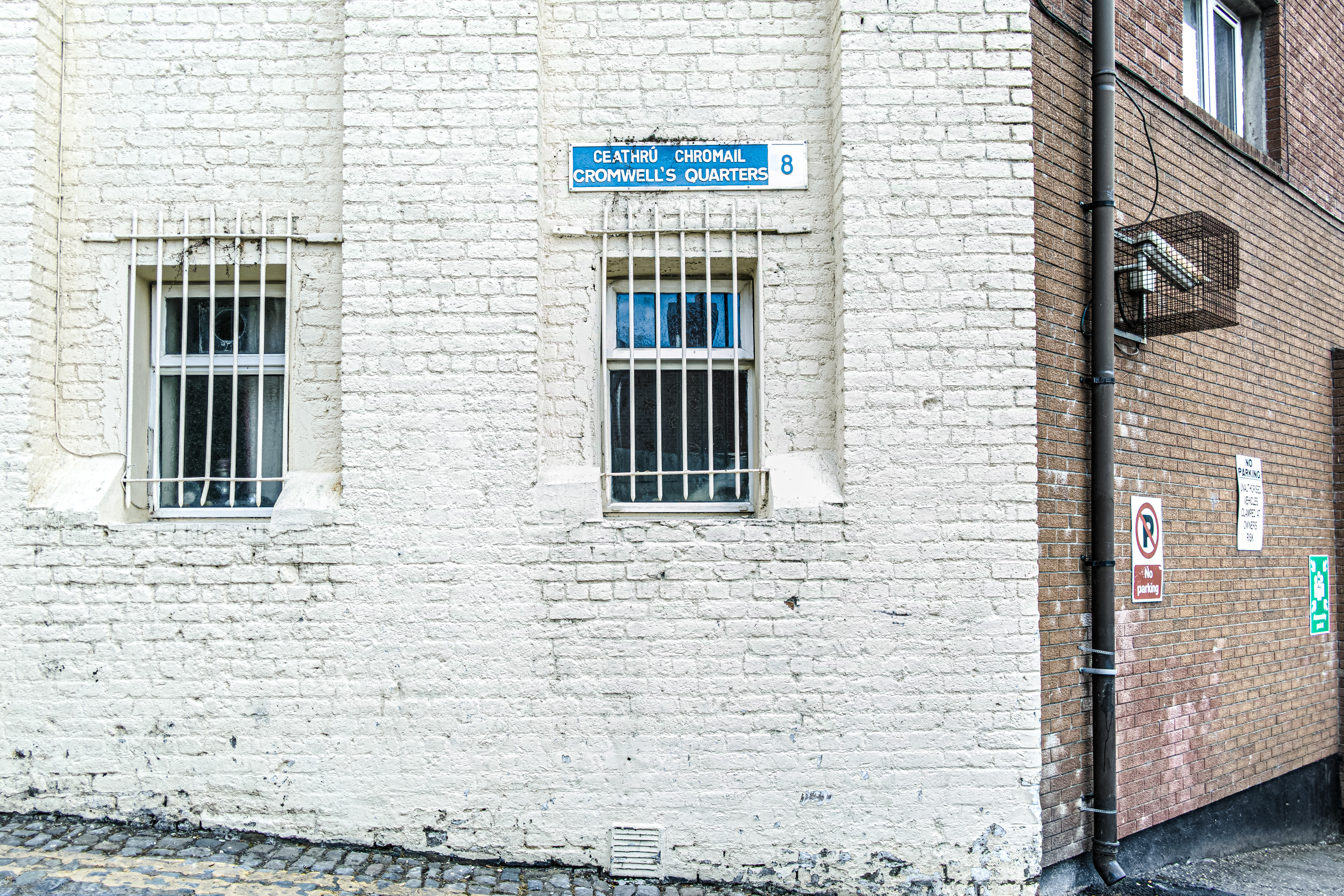
A lane named after Cromwell in Dublin 8

== Biography ==
=== Early life ===
Henry Cromwell was born at Huntingdon on 20 January 1628.

He was educated at Felsted School and Emmanuel College, Cambridge.

=== Military career ===
Henry Cromwell entered the New Model Army towards the close of the First Civil War, and was in 1647 either a captain in Harrison's regiment or the commander of Fairfax's lifeguard. Heath and Wood identify him with the commandant of the life-guard. In the summer of 1648 Henry Cromwell appears to have been serving under his father in the north of England.

In February 1650 Cromwell had attained the rank of colonel, and followed his father to Ireland with reinforcements. He and Lord Broghill defeated Lord Inchiquin near Limerick in April 1650. In 1653 Cromwell was nominated one of the representatives of Ireland in the Barebones Parliament.

=== Political career ===
On 22 February 1654 Henry Cromwell was enrolled in Gray's Inn (this was merely an honorary registration).

After the dissolution of that parliament and the establishment of the Protectorate, his father despatched him to Ireland on a mission of inquiry to discover the feelings of the Irish officers towards the new government, and to counteract the influence of the Anabaptists. He reported that the army in general, with the exception of the Anabaptists, were well satisfied with the recent change, and recommended that Ludlow, of whose venomous discontent and reproachful utterances he complains, should be replaced as lieutenant-general by John Desborough. Charles Fleetwood, though a staunch supporter of the protectorate, he regarded as too deeply involved with the Anabaptist party to be safely continued in Ireland, and advised his recall to England after a time, and the appointment of Desborough to act as his deputy. Before leaving Ireland he held a discussion with Ludlow on the lawfulness of the protectorate, which the latter has recorded at length in his Memoirs.

In August 1654 a new Irish council was commissioned, and the council of state voted that Cromwell should be appointed commander of the Irish army and a member of the new council. This appointment seems to have been made at the request of Lord Broghill and other Irish gentlemen. In spite of this pressure it was not till 25 December 1654 that Cromwell became a member of the Irish council, though the date of his commission as major-general of the forces in Ireland was 24 Aug. 1654. The cause of this delay was probably Cromwell's reluctance to advance his sons (see Carlyle, Cromwell, Letter cxcix.) Whatever the Protector's intentions may have been, and there are several references in the letters of John Thurloe and Henry Cromwell which prove that this reluctance was real, Fleetwood was re-called to England very soon after the coming of Henry Cromwell to Ireland. He landed in Ireland in July 1655, and Fleetwood left in September. The latter still retained his title of lord-lieutenant, so that Cromwell was merely his deputy — the position which he had intended Desborough to fill. The object of the change in the government of Ireland was to substitute a settled civil government for the rule of a clique of officers, and to put an end to the influence of the Anabaptists, who had hitherto monopolised the direction of the government. The policy of Cromwell towards the native Irish was very little milder than that of his predecessor. His earliest letters show him zealously engaged in shipping young women and boys to populate Jamaica. He suggested to Thurloe the exportation of fifteen hundred or two thousand young boys of twelve or fourteen years of age. He does not seem to have sought to mitigate the rigour of the transplantation, or to have considered it either unjust or impolitic. On the other hand, his religious views were more liberal, and he remonstrated against the oath of abjuration imposed on the Irish Catholics in 1657.

What distinguished Cromwell's administration from that of Fleetwood was the different policy adopted by him towards the English colony in Ireland. Instead of conducting the government in the interests of the soldiery, and in accordance with their views, he consulted the interests of the old settlers, the ancient Protestant inhabitants of Ireland, and was repaid by their confidence and admiration. A letter addressed to the Protector by Vincent Gookin, at a time when there was some danger of Cromwell's resignation or removal, shows the feelings with which this party regarded his rule.

The Presbyterians and the more moderate sects of Independents, hitherto oppressed by the predominance enjoyed by the Anabaptists, expressed a like satisfaction with his government. With the Anabaptist leaders Cromwell had, in January 1656, an interview, in which he very plainly stated his intentions towards them. "I told them plainly that they might expect equal liberty in their spiritual and civil concernments with any others; and ... that I held myself obliged in duty to protect them from being imposed upon by any; as also to keep them from doing the like to others. Liberty and countenance they might expect from me, but to rule me, or to rule with me, I should not approve of". This line of conduct he faithfully followed in spite of many provocations. His adversaries were powerful in England, and continually at the ear of the Protector; but Oliver, though chary of praise, and not giving his son all the public support he expected, approved of his conduct in this matter. At the same time he warned him against being "over jealous", and "making it a business to be too hard" for those who contested with him.

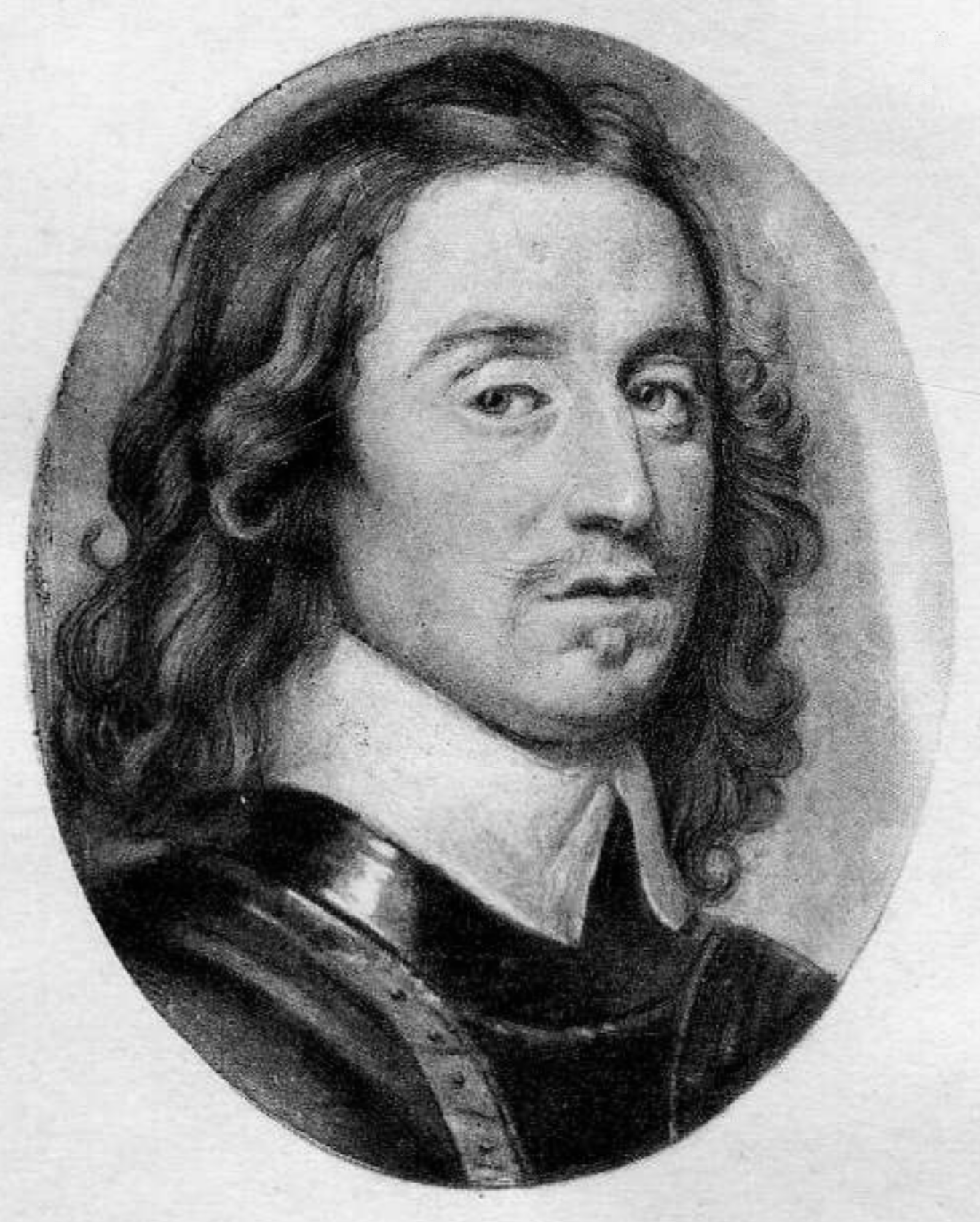
Henry Cromwell after Samuel Cooper (1609–1672)

C. H. Firth states in the Dictionary of National Biography that in truth Henry's great weakness lay in the fact that he was too sensitive and irritable. His letters are a long series of complaints, and he continually talks of resigning his office. One of the first of his troubles was the mutinous condition of Ludlow's regiment, which he took the precaution of disbanding as soon as possible. Then, without Cromwell's knowledge, petitions were got up by his partisans for his appointment to Fleetwood's post, which afforded Hewson and other Anabaptists the opportunity of public protests on behalf of their old commander, in which they identified the deputy's supporters with the enemies of the godly interest. In November 1656 two generals and a couple of colonels simultaneously threw up their commissions on account of their dissatisfaction with Henry's policy.

Just as Cromwell was congratulating himself that the opposition of the Anabaptists was finally crushed, he was involved in fresh perplexities by the intrigues and resignation of Steele, the Irish Chancellor. After the second foundation of the protectorate by the "Petition and Advice", Cromwell was at length appointed Lord-Lieutenant by commission dated 16 November 1657. His new rank gave him more dignity and more responsibility, but did not increase his power or put an end to his difficulties. His promotion was accompanied by the appointment of a new Irish council, "the major art of whom", wrote Henry to his brother Richard, "were men of a professed spirit of contradiction to whatsoever I would have, and took counsel together how to lay wait for me without a cause". His popularity was shown by a vote of parliament on 8 June 1657, settling upon him lands to the value of £1,500 a year, which he refused on the ground of the poverty of Ireland and the indebtedness of England.

At the time of Cromwell's appointment the pay of the Irish army was eight months in arrears, and £180,000, owing from the English exchequer, was necessary to clear the engagements of the Irish government. The difficulty of obtaining this money, as also the appointment of the hostile councillors, he attributed to his adversaries in the Protector's council. "Those who were against my coming to this employment, by keeping back our monies have an after game to play, for it is impossible for me to continue in this place upon so huge disadvantages". He was also charged to disband a large part of the Irish army, but not allowed to have a voice in the management of disbanding.

Cromwell endeavoured to devise means of raising the money to pay them in Ireland, but found the country was too poor, and the taxes far heavier than in England. By using the utmost economy he wrote that £196,000 might suffice for the present, but all he seems to have obtained was the promise of £30,000. In the opinion of Firth, to have succeeded under such unfavourable circumstances in maintaining tranquillity and apparent contentment is no small proof of Cromwell's ability as a ruler. "The hypocrisy of men may be deep", he wrote in April 1658, "but really any indifferent spectator would gather, from the seeming unanimity and affection of the people of Ireland, that his highness’s interest is irresistible here". The adversaries who rendered the task of governing Ireland so burdensome appear to have been the leaders of the military party who surrounded the Protector. Henry Cromwell frequently refers to them in terms of dislike and distrust, especially in his letters to Thurloe during 1657 and 1658. He considered them as opposed to any legal settlement and desirous to perpetuate their own arbitrary power.

On the question of the acceptance of the crown offered to his father in 1657 his own views were almost exactly the same as those of the Protector himself. From the first Henry held the constitution sketched in the articles of the Petition and Advice to be "a most excellent structure", and was taken by the prospect of obtaining a parliamentary basis for the protectorate. But the title of king, "a gaudy feather in the hat of authority", he held a thing of too slight importance to be the subject of earnest contention. Both directly and through Thurloe he urged his father to refuse the title, but to endeavour to obtain the new constitutional settlement offered him by parliament with it.

The sudden dissolution of the Second Protectorate Parliament in February 1658 was a great blow to Cromwell's hopes of settlement, and he expressed his fears lest the Protector should be induced again to resort to non-legal or extra-legal ways of raising money. Now John Lambert was removed, the odium of such things would fall nearer his highness. Errors in raising money were the most compendious ways to cause a general discontent. He advised the calling of a new parliament as soon as possible, but it should be preceded by the remodelling of the army and the cashiering of turbulent officers. He opposed the proposal to tax the cavalier party promiscuously, but approved the imposition of a test on all members of the approaching parliament.

Cromwell's great aim was to found the protectorate on as broad a basis as possible, to free it from the control of the military leaders, and to rally to its support as many of the royalists and old parliamentarians as possible. He knew that the maintenance of the existing state of affairs depended solely on the life of the Protector. The news of his father's illness and the uncertainty as to his successor redoubled Cromwell's fears. The announcement that the Protector had before dying nominated Richard Cromwell was very welcome to Henry. "I was relieved by it", he wrote to Richard, "not only upon the public consideration, but even upon the account of the goodness of God to our poor family, who hath preserved us from the contempt of the enemy".

There is no sign that Cromwell ever sought or desired the succession himself. As the Protector's death had determined his existing commission as lord deputy, he now received a new one, but with the higher title of Lieutenant and Governor-General. It was with great reluctance that Cromwell was persuaded to accept the renewal of his commission. He was anxious to come over to England, not only for the benefit of his own health, but (after he had agreed to continue in the government of Ireland) in order to confer with Richard and his friends in England on the principles of Irish policy, and on the prospects and plans of the new government in England. However, both Thurloe and Lord Broghill strongly urged him not to come. The former wrote that his continuance in Ireland, and at the head of so good an army, was one of the greatest safeguards of his brother's rule in England, and Broghill added, "Neither Ireland nor Harry Cromwell are safe if separated". At Dublin, therefore, he remained watching with anxiety the gathering of the storm in England, and hoping that parliament would bring some remedy to the distempers of the army.

The meetings of the officers in London and the manifesto published by them roused him to vehement expostulation on 20 October 1658 with Fleetwood, whom they had petitioned the Protector to appoint commander-in-chief. He was wroth at the slight to his brother, but still more at the aspersions cast on his father's memory, and, above all things, distressed by the prospect of renewed civil war. For the next few months Cromwell's letters are unusually few and short, caused in part by his attacks of illness, in part by the tact that he knew his letters were not secure.

Cromwell's numerous correspondents in England kept him well informed of the progress of events there, but he bitterly complains that for some time before the dissolution of the Third Protectorate Parliament he had received no letters from the Protector. In answer to the letter of the English army leaders which announced the fall of his brother's government, he sent an ambiguous reply assuring them of the peaceable disposition of the Irish army, and commissioning three officers to represent their views in England. It is plain that he regarded his brother still as the legitimate governor, and was prepared to act for his restoration if so commanded.

During this period of suspense the hopes of the Royalists (Cavaliers) rose high, and more than one overture was made to Henry on behalf of Charles II. Lord Falconbridge and possibly Lord Broghill seem to have been the agents employed in this negotiation but nothing was more opposed to the views of Henry than to promote the restoration of the Stuarts. "My opinion", he wrote on 21 March 1659, "is that any extreme is more tolerable than returning to Charles Stuart. Other disasters are temporary and may be mended; those not".

The principles Cromwell had expressed in his reproof to Fleetwood forbade him to use his army for personal ends, or seek to impose its will on the nation. Accordingly, after vainly awaiting the expected instructions from Richard, and receiving from others credible notice of his brother's acquiescence in the late revolution, Henry on 15 June forwarded his own submission to the new government. Before receiving this letter parliament (the restored Rump) on 7 June had ordered him to deliver up the government of Ireland and return to England. Obeying their orders he reached England about the end of June, gave an account of his conduct there to the council of state on 6 July, and then retired to Cambridgeshire.

=== Later life ===
For the remainder of his life Cromwell lived in obscurity. He lost, in consequence of the Restoration, lands in England to the value of £2,000 a year, probably his share of the forfeited estates which had been conferred on his father. With the pay he had received during his service in Ireland he had purchased an estate worth between six and seven hundred a year, which he succeeded in retaining.

In his petition to Charles II for that object, Cromwell urged that his actions had been dictated by natural duty to his father, not by any malice against the king. He pleaded the merits of his government of Ireland, and the favour he had shown the Royalists during the time of his power. Clarendon, Ormonde, and many other royalists exerted their influence in his favour. Accordingly, the lands of Cromwell in Meath and Connaught were confirmed to his trustees by a special proviso of the Act of Settlement; but his family seems to have lost them in the next generation. They are said to have been illegally dispossessed by some of the Clanrickarde family, the ancient owners of the land bought by Henry Cromwell's arrears. During the latter years of his life Cromwell resided at Spinney Abbey in Wicken, Cambridgeshire, which he purchased in 1661.

King Charles II seems to have been satisfied of Cromwell's peaceableness, for though more than once denounced by informers, he was never disquieted on that account. Noble collects several anecdotes of doubtful authority concerning the relations of Charles II and Cromwell. He died on 23 March 1674 (O.S.), aged forty-six, and was buried at Wicken Church in Cambridgeshire.

== Family ==
On 10 May 1653 Cromwell married Elizabeth (died 7 April 1687), daughter of Sir Francis Russell. They had five sons and two daughters, the history of whose descendants is elaborately traced by Noble and Waylen. His second son, Henry Cromwell, married Hannah Hewling, sister of the two Hewlings executed in 1686 for their share in the Monmouth Rebellion, and died in 1711, a major in Fielding's regiment.

== Ancestry ==
Ancestors of Henry Cromwell

16. Sir Richard Williams
8. Sir Henry Cromwell
17. Frances Murfyn
4. Robert Cromwell
18. Sir Ralph Warren
9. Joan Warren
19. Joan Lake
2. Oliver Cromwell, 1st Lord Protector
10. William Steward
5. Elizabeth Steward
22. Thomas Paine
11. Catherine Paine
1. Henry Cromwell
24. Richard Bourchier
12. Thomas Bourchier
6. Sir James Bourchier
26. James Morley
13. Elizabeth Morley
3. Elizabeth Bourchier
14. Thomas Crane
7. Frances Crane

== Notes ==
Political offices
Preceded by Charles Fleetwood	Lord Deputy of Ireland; 1657–1659	Succeeded by Edmund Ludlow
Academic offices
Preceded by The Marquess of Ormonde	Chancellor of the University of Dublin; 1653–1660	Succeeded by The Duke of Ormonde
