= Richard Cromwell (disambiguation) =

Richard Cromwell (1626–1712) was one of the sons of Oliver Cromwell, Protector of England.

Richard Cromwell may also refer to:

- Sir Richard Williams (alias Cromwell) (1510–1544), also known as Sir Richard Cromwell, Welsh soldier and courtier, and nephew of Thomas Cromwell
- Richard Cromwell (MP) (1572–1628), English MP for [Huntingdon and Lostwithiel
- Richard Cromwell (actor) (1910–1960), American actor
