= Fulham House =

Building in Fulham, London, England

- Fulham, London
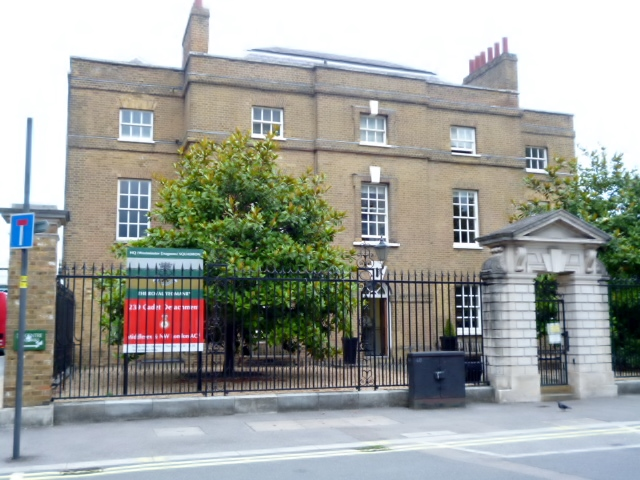
- Fulham House

Site information
- Type: Drill Hall

Location
- Location within London
- Coordinates: 51.46799°N 0.21021°W

Site history
- Built: 1902
- Built for: War Office
- In use: 1902-Present

Fulham House is a military installation at 87 Fulham High Street, Fulham, London. It is a Grade II listed building.

== History ==
The original house was named Passors after a family living on the site during the reign of King Edward III. A passor or passator was a ferryman. A later occupant was the wool merchant Ralph Warren, who was Lord Mayor of London in 1536. It was then occupied by the cloth merchant Sir Thomas White, also a Lord Mayor of London, as well as a civic benefactor and founder of St John's College, Oxford. Passors was subsequently inherited by Sir Henry Cromwell, grandfather of Oliver Cromwell.

The current building was built as a private house in the early 18th century. In 1804, it became the Fulham House School for Girls having been let to the Misses Fleming, then let to the Loves, and from 1840, let to the Misses King who ran the school for 40 years. In 1879, the house was purchased by the local builder Parkins Hammond Jones, and the family lived there until 1902 when it was acquired by the commanding officer of the 26th Middlesex (Cyclist) Rifle Volunteer Corps for use as the headquarters of his unit.

The 26th Middlesex (Cyclist) Rifle Volunteer Corps evolved to become the 25th (County of London) Cyclist Battalion in 1908. The battalion was mobilised at the drill hall in August 1914 before being deployed to the Western Front. When the London Regiment was broken up in 1937, the battalion became part of the 47th (2nd London) Divisional Signals, Royal Signals.

After the Second World War, the drill hall became the headquarters of the 23rd (Southern) Corps Signal Regiment. Once the Royal Signals left the site, the drill hall was occupied by B (Queen's Royal Rifles) Company of the 4th Battalion the Royal Green Jackets in 1967. This unit was re-formed at Fulham as F (Royal Green Jackets) Company, The London Regiment in 1999. F Company was disbanded in 2004.

In 2006 the regimental headquarters of the Royal Yeomanry and its command and support squadron, the Westminster Dragoons, moved to Fulham House. As of 2014 its drill hall still housed the war memorial for the world wars for the London Scottish.
