= Red Lodge, Suffolk =

Village in Suffolk, England

Coordinates: 52.304°N 0.493°E

Red Lodge
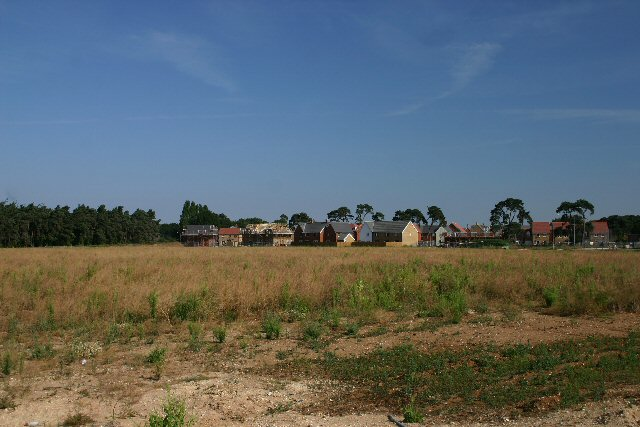
- View of Red Lodge village in 2006

- Location within Suffolk
- Population: 3,834
- District: West Suffolk
- Shire county: Suffolk
- Region: East
- Country: England
- Sovereign state: United Kingdom
- Post town: BURY ST EDMUNDS
- Postcode district: IP28
- Dialling code: 01638
- UK Parliament: West Suffolk

Red Lodge is a village and civil parish situated in rural Suffolk, England, between Mildenhall and Newmarket, and very close to the A11 and A14 roads.

== The village ==
Red Lodge is a growing community administered by West Suffolk Council. It has new homes from a variety of building companies centred on the Kings Warren development at the northern end of the village. Currently, community facilities include an Ecumenical church, village hall and venue (known as the Millennium Centre), a sports pavilion with tennis courts, a five-a-side football pitch and allotments. A new school opened in September 2012 and the new village centre which opened in 2014 has a convenience store, fish and chip shop, kebab shop, pharmacy, hair dressers and estate agents.

== History of the community ==
The village dates back to 1926 when the first houses were built, although the pub, Red Lodge Inn, is far older, having been recorded on a map of the site in 1885. It is thought to be a former hunting lodge dating back to the 17th century. The area where most of the new housing is situated was formerly a rabbit warren attached to Freckenham Manor lands, with a history dating back to the 13th century. Red Lodge became a civil parish in 1987, having previously been part of Freckenham parish.

== Fictional reference ==
The 2010 Doctor Who audio drama The Demons of Red Lodge is set in Red Lodge in 1665.

== Red Lodge Heath ==
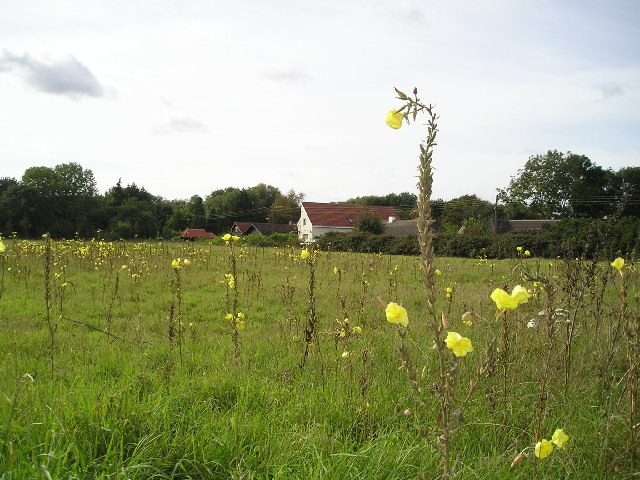
View over scrubland to Red Lodge Inn

Red Lodge Heath is an area of acid grassland and lowland and is an SSSI, with a number of nationally rare plants and animals. It includes a population of the five-banded tailed digger wasp, Cerceris quinquefasciata, which nests in bare sand along a path to the north of the site, and on sparsely vegetated slopes to the west. Discovery of the wasp population in 2005 by English Nature meant that Forest Heath District Council had to adapt proposed housing and school development plans in this area of the village.

The Heath is maintained by volunteers from a conservation group established in 2007 and awarded a Lottery grant in 2012.

== Transport links ==
The nearest railway station to Red Lodge is in Kennett, 2 miles (3 km) away. Buses also serve the village, offering transportation to Mildenhall, Newmarket, Bury St Edmunds and other nearby towns and villages. Stansted Airport is 41 miles (66 km) away and Luton Airport is 55 miles (89 km). National Express coaches operate services from nearby Mildenhall to Central London; Cambridge; Brighton via Stansted, Heathrow and Gatwick Airports.

== Education ==
St Christopher's CEVCP School in Bellflower Crescent opened in September 2012 and replaced Tuddenham Primary School, which was too small for the number of students. It is a Church of England voluntary faith school, meaning that Christian values are promoted within the curriculum and all faiths are welcomed. It has capacity for 315 pupils, with further development planned to increase capacity to 420. It delivers education for 5- to 11-year-olds and follows the National Curriculum.

The two-storey school is accessible by people with different physical abilities. Teaching facilities include interactive multi-media systems in classrooms, art, design technology and food technology areas, playing field, hard court, hall and drama studio.

In the last Ofsted inspection in 2009 (which took place at the Tuddenham premises), the school was rated 2 (good).
