= Sir Oliver Cromwell =

English landowner, lawyer and politician

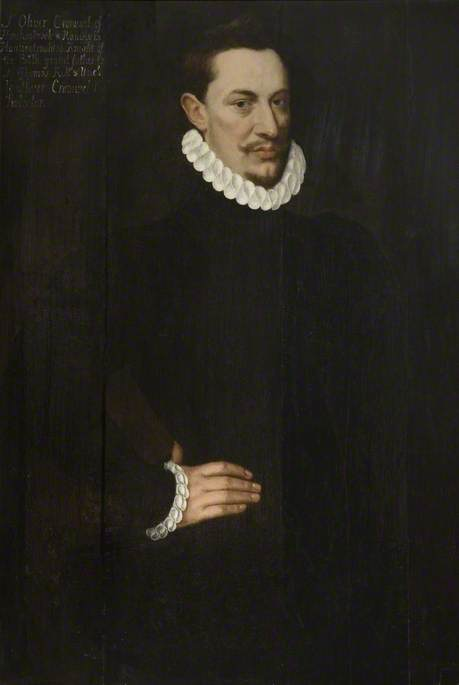
- Sir Oliver Cromwell (1563–1655), c. 1589, Hieronymus Custodis (circle of)

Member of Parliament for Huntingdonshire
- In office 1589–1625

Personal details
- Born: c. 1562
- Died: 28 August 1655 (aged 92–93)
- Resting place: Ramsey Abbey, Ramsey, Huntingdonshire; 52°26′54″N 0°06′03″W
- Spouse(s): Elizabeth Bromley; Anne Hooftman
- Children: with Elizabeth: Henry; John; William; Thomas; Hannah; Katherine; Jane; Elizabeth; with Anne: Oliver; Giles; Mary; Anne
- Parent(s): Sir Henry Williams (alias Cromwell); Joan Warren

Sir Oliver Cromwell KB (c. 1562 – 28 August 1655) was an English landowner, lawyer and politician who sat in the House of Commons at various times between 1589 and 1625. He was the uncle of Oliver Cromwell, the Member of Parliament, general, and Lord Protector of England.

== Biography ==
Born around 1562, Cromwell was the eldest son and heir of Sir Henry Williams, alias Cromwell, of Hinchingbrooke, and his wife Joan, a daughter of Sir Ralph Warren, Lord Mayor of London. He matriculated from Queens' College, Cambridge, at Lent 1579 and was admitted at Lincoln's Inn on 12 May 1582. He lived at Godmanchester until the death of his father.

Cromwell held a number of local offices: In 1585 he was captain of musters for Huntingdonshire and at the time of the Spanish Armada he was one of the officers in charge of the men raised in Huntingdonshire. He was recorder of Huntingdon in 1596. He was Sheriff of Cambridgeshire and Huntingdonshire from 1598 to 1599 and while Sheriff, in 1598, Queen Elizabeth may have dubbed him a knight bachelor.

He was a Justice of the Peace from about 1585 but was removed in 1587, when there was one of the periodic purges of justices. In 1594 he was restored to his position as a J.P.; as the online History of Parliament observes: "It was felt that in a county as small as Huntingdonshire, the custom by which only one member of a family could be a justice was inapplicable — particularly in the case of the owners of Hinchingbrooke".

In 1600 the lutenist and composer John Dowland dedicated a pavane to him which was published in his Second Book of Songs.

Cromwell was first elected one of the members of parliament for Huntingdonshire in 1589. He was re-elected to each Parliament up to and including the Addled Parliament of 1614 (that is, in 1593, 1597, 1601, 1604, and 1614). In 1621, the seat was occupied by Richard Beavill, but Sir Oliver stood for and was elected to the Happy Parliament of 1624, and its successor, the Useless Parliament of 1625, after the dissolution at King James' death.

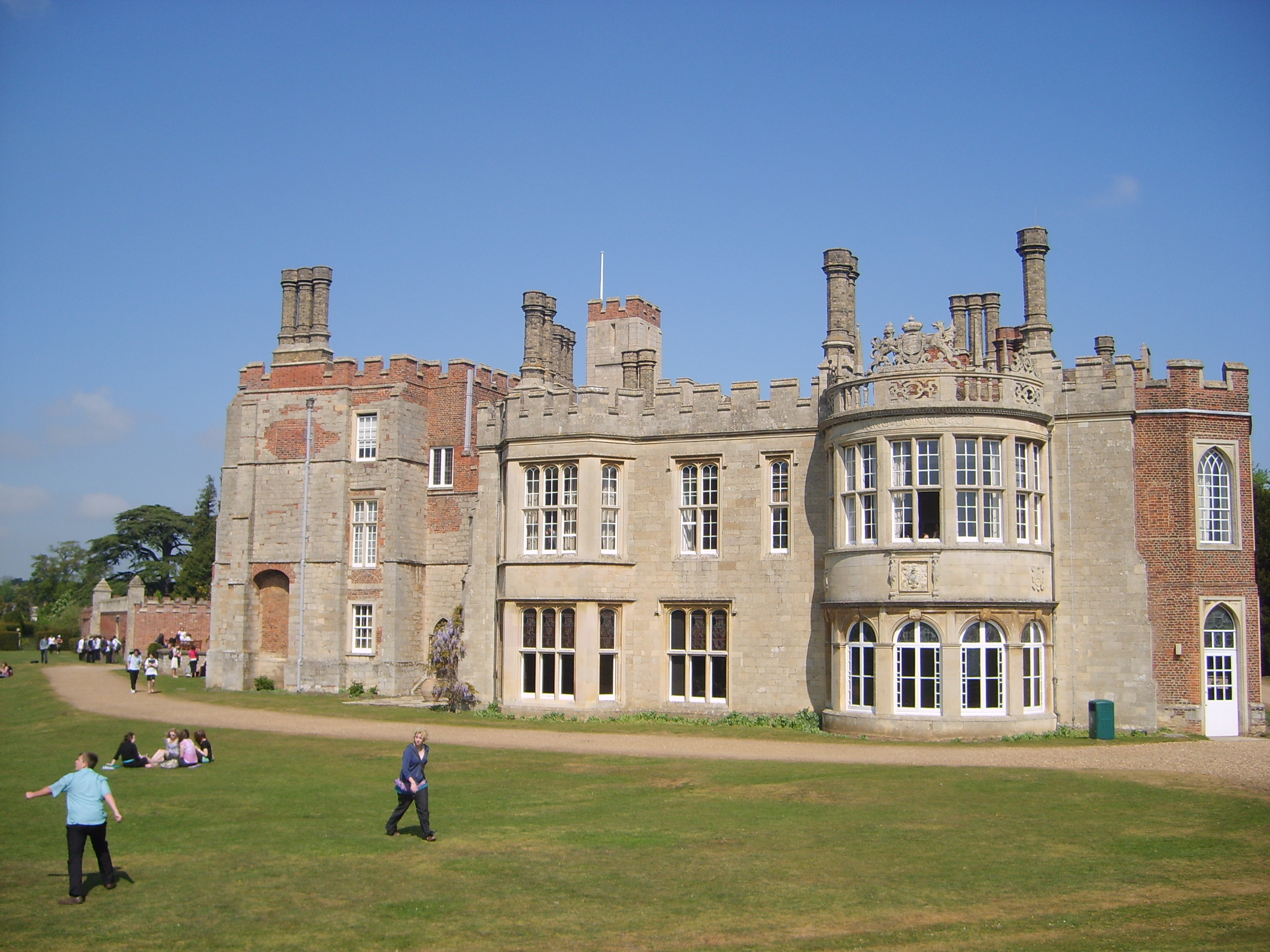
Hinchingbrooke House

He entertained King James at Hinchingbrooke on 27 April 1603, when the King was travelling south to occupy the English throne. Cromwell's presents to the King included "a cup of gold, goodly horses, deep-mouthed hounds, and divers hawks of excellent wing" and some of the heads of Cambridge University came dressed in scarlet gowns and corner caps to present a Latin oration. It was described as "the greatest feast that had ever been given to a king by a subject". King James made him a Knight of the Bath at the coronation on 24 July 1603. He became attorney to Queen Anne of Denmark and a gentleman of the privy chamber.

On 6 January 1604, his father died and Sir Oliver succeeded to Hinchingbrooke and the family estates; about 1605, he also succeeded to his father's office, Custos Rotulorum of Huntingdonshire.

King James was frequently at Hinchingbrooke, apparently treating the place as his own – in 1614 he appointed a keeper of the wardrobe there. By 1623 Sir Oliver was trying to sell Hinchingbrooke to the King, to pay off his debts, but the death of James I in March 1625 ended the negotiations on Hinchingbrooke. Hinchingbrooke was finally sold on 20 June 1627 to Sir Sidney Montagu. Other estates had been sold to meet debts contracted to London moneylenders and he was left with the property at Ramsey, Cambridgeshire.

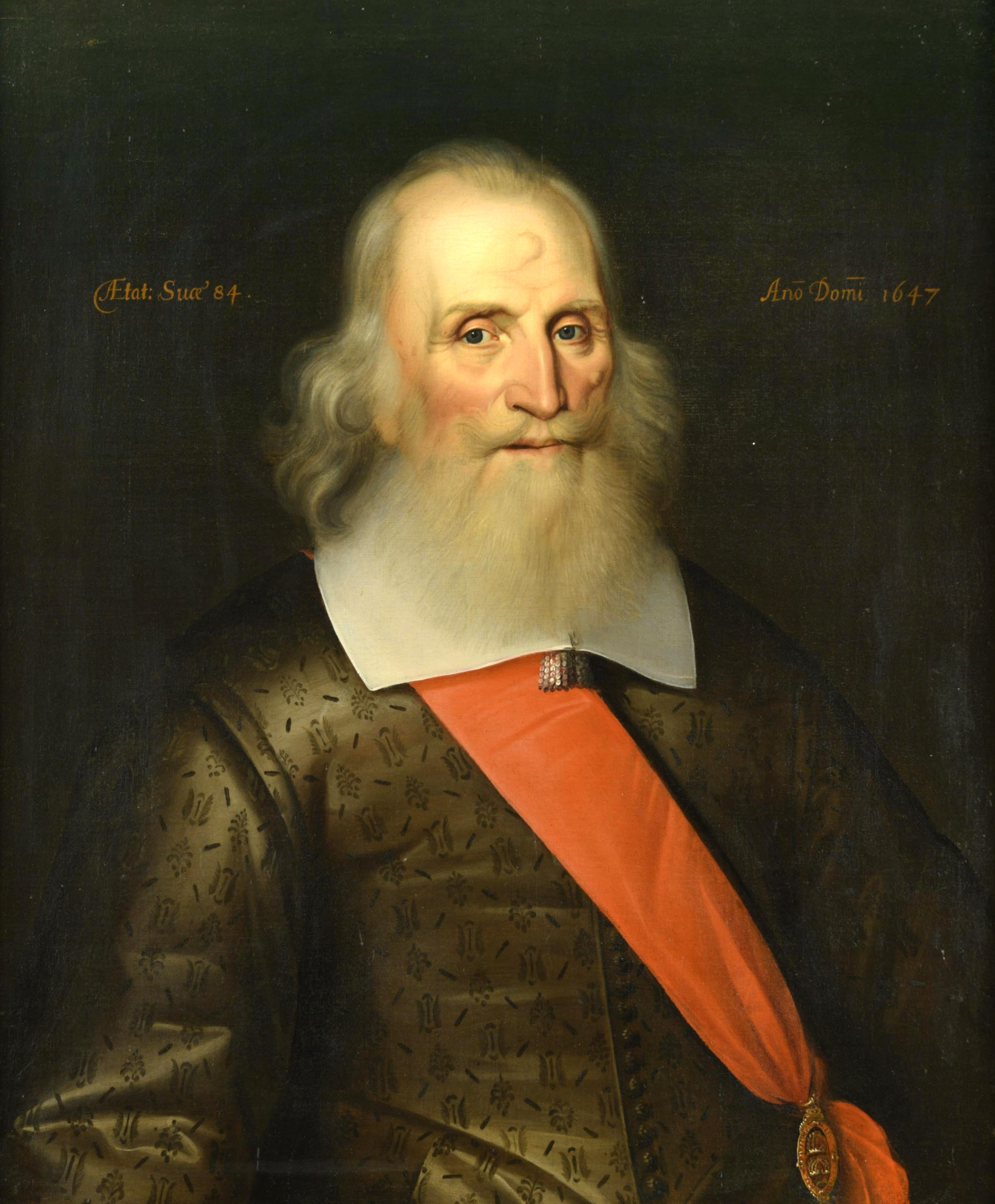
Portrait of Sir Oliver Cromwell, English School, 1647, Oil on Canvas.

Cromwell was loyal to the crown at the outbreak of the English Civil War. His nephew and godson Oliver Cromwell was sent by parliament to the house at Ramsey to search for arms which could be sent to the King at York. The younger Cromwell is said to have stood head uncovered in the presence of his uncle. Later the Ramsey estates were sequestered but were restored to him on 18 April 1648 through the influence of his nephew who became the Lord Protector.

Cromwell died in 1655 and was buried at Ramsey on the same day, 28 August, to prevent his body being seized by creditors. According to Sir William Dugdale, he died two days after becoming 'scorched' when falling or collapsing into a hearth at his home while drying himself after being out in rain.

== Marriages and issue ==
Cromwell married firstly Elizabeth, daughter of Thomas Bromley, the Lord Chancellor and Elizabeth Fortescue, by whom he had four sons and four daughters:

- Henry
- John
- William
- Thomas
- Hannah
- Katherine
- Jane
- Elizabeth

He married secondly in July 1601, Anne, widow of the financier Sir Horatio Palavicino and daughter of Gillis Hooftman of Antwerp, by whom he had two sons and two daughters:

- Oliver
- Giles
- Mary
- Anne

He had a total of twelve children, he himself being the oldest of 11 siblings: two of Cromwell's sons by his first marriage subsequently married two of Anne's daughters by her first marriage. Another daughter, Elizabeth (probably also by his first marriage), married secondly the Roundhead Sir Richard Ingoldsby: one of their many children, Richard Ingoldsby, was among those who signed Charles I's death warrant. His second son John married Abigail Clere, daughter of Sir Henry Clere, 1st Baronet; Abigail is familiar to readers of the Diary of Samuel Pepys as "Madam Williams", who left her husband to live openly with Pepys' colleague William Brouncker, 2nd Viscount Brouncker. It seems that John and Abigail, like many of the Cromwells, thought it prudent after 1660 to use the older family name, Williams. Another daughter, Mary, married Edward Rolt (born cir 1600) in 1628. They had a son Thomas Rolt (1632-1710). Mary died in 1634.

He was the brother of Richard, Robert (the father of the Lord Protector) and Henry Cromwell.

== Notes ==
- Bennett, Martyn (2006). Oliver Cromwell. Oxon: Routledge. p. 4. ISBN 978-0-415-31921-8.
- Clark, George Henry (1893). Oliver Cromwell. Boston: D. Lothrop Company. p. 58. republished. forgottenbooks.org. 13 July 2015. ISBN 9781440078705.
- Gough, Richard (1785). "A Short Genealogical View of the Family of Oliver Cromwell. To which is prefixed, a copious pedigree". Bibliotheca Topographica Britannica. Vol. XXXI. London: J. Nichols.
- J.C.H. (1981). "Cromwell, Oliver (?1566–1655), of Godmanchester and Hinchingbrooke, Hunts". History of Parliament (Online).
- Harrison, Frederic (1888). Oliver Cromwell. London, New York: Macmillan.
- Healy, Simon (2010). "Cromwell, Sir Oliver (1562/6-1655), of Hinchingbrooke House and Ramsey Abbey, Hunts". In Thrush, Andrew; Ferris, John P. (eds.). The History of Parliament: the House of Commons 1604-1629.
- Lysons, Daniel (1810). Cambridgeshire, and the County Palatine of Chester. Magna Britannia: Being a Concise Topographical Account of the Several Counties of Great Britain, Volume 2. London: T. Cadell and W. Davies.
- Page, William; Proby, Granville; Ladds, S. Inskip, eds. (1932). "The borough of Huntingdon: Introduction, castle and borough". A History of the County of Huntingdon. Vol. 2. pp. 121–139.
- Parliament (1830). "House of Lords Journal (18 April 1648)". Journal of the House of Lords. 10. Institute of Historical Research (published 1767–1830): 206–207.
- N.M.S. (1981). "Cromwell, Robert (d.1617), of Huntingdon". History of Parliament (Online).
- Sainty, J C (February 2004). "Custodes Rotulorum 1544–1646: Huntingdon". Institute for Historical Research. (a provisional list).
- Poulton, Diana (1982). John Dowland (2, illustrated ed.). University of California Press. p. 401. ISBN 0520046498.
- Shaw, William Arthur; Burtchaell, George Dames (1906). The Knights of England. A complete record from the earliest time to the present day of the knights of all the orders of chivalry in England, Scotland, and Ireland, and of knights bachelors, incorporating a complete list of knights bachelors dubbed in Ireland (2 volumes). Vol. 2. London: Sherratt and Hughes. v. 1, p. 154, v. 2, p. 95.
- Venn, John; Venn, J. A., eds. (2011). Alumni Cantabrigienses: A Biographical List of All Known Students, Graduates and Holders of Office at the University of Cambridge, from the Earliest Times to 1900, Volume 1. Cambridge University Press. ISBN 9781108036078.
- Wall, Alison (2004). "'The Greatest Disgrace': The Making and Unmaking of JPs in Elizabethan and Jacobean England". The English Historical Review. 119 (481): 312–332. doi:10.1093/ehr/119.481.312. (Abstract)

Parliament of England
Preceded by Edward Wingfield; George Walton	Member of Parliament for Huntingdonshire; 1589–1614; With: Edward Wingfield 1589–1593; Sir Gervase Clifton 1597–1601; Sir Robert Cotton 1604–1611; Sir Robert Payne 1614	Succeeded by Richard Beavill; Sir Robert Payne
Preceded by Richard Beavill; Sir Robert Payne	Member of Parliament for Huntingdonshire; 1624–1625; With: Edward Montagu	Succeeded by Edward Montagu; Sir Robert Payne
