= Robert Payne (Huntingdonshire MP) =

English landowner and politician (1573–1631)

Sir Robert Payne (29 September 1573 – 18 June 1631) was an English landowner and politician who sat in the House of Commons at various times between 1614 and 1629.

== Biography ==
Robert Payne was the son of Robert Payne of Midloe, Huntingdonshire and his wife Maria Watertown, daughter of Sir Robert Watertown of Waterton, Yorkshire. In 1603 he inherited the estate of Midloe on the death of his father. He was knighted at Greenwich on 22 May 1605. In 1607 he was High Sheriff of Cambridgeshire and Huntingdonshire. He was a subscriber of the London Virginia Company in 1609. In 1614, Payne was elected Member of Parliament for Huntingdonshire. He was re-elected MP for Huntingdonshire in 1621. In 1626 he was elected MP for Huntingdonshire again. He was re-elected in 1628 and sat until 1629 when King Charles decided to rule without parliament for eleven years.

Payne died at the age of aged 58.

== Personal life ==
Payne married Elizabeth Rotheram, the daughter of George Rotheram of Somery, Bedfordshire and had 5 sons and 6 daughters.

Parliament of England
| Preceded by Sir Robert Cotton, 1st Baronet, of Connington; Sir Oliver Cromwell | Member of Parliament for Huntingdonshire; 1614–1622; With: Sir Oliver Cromwell; Richard Beavill | Succeeded by Edward Montagu; Sir Oliver Cromwell |
| Preceded by Edward Montagu; Sir Oliver Cromwell | Member of Parliament for Huntingdonshire; 1628–1629; With: Edward Montagu; Sir Capel Bedel | Parliament suspended until 1640 |
