= Red Lodge Heath =

Protected area in Suffolk, England

Coordinates: 52.302°N 0.487°E

- Site of Special Scientific Interest
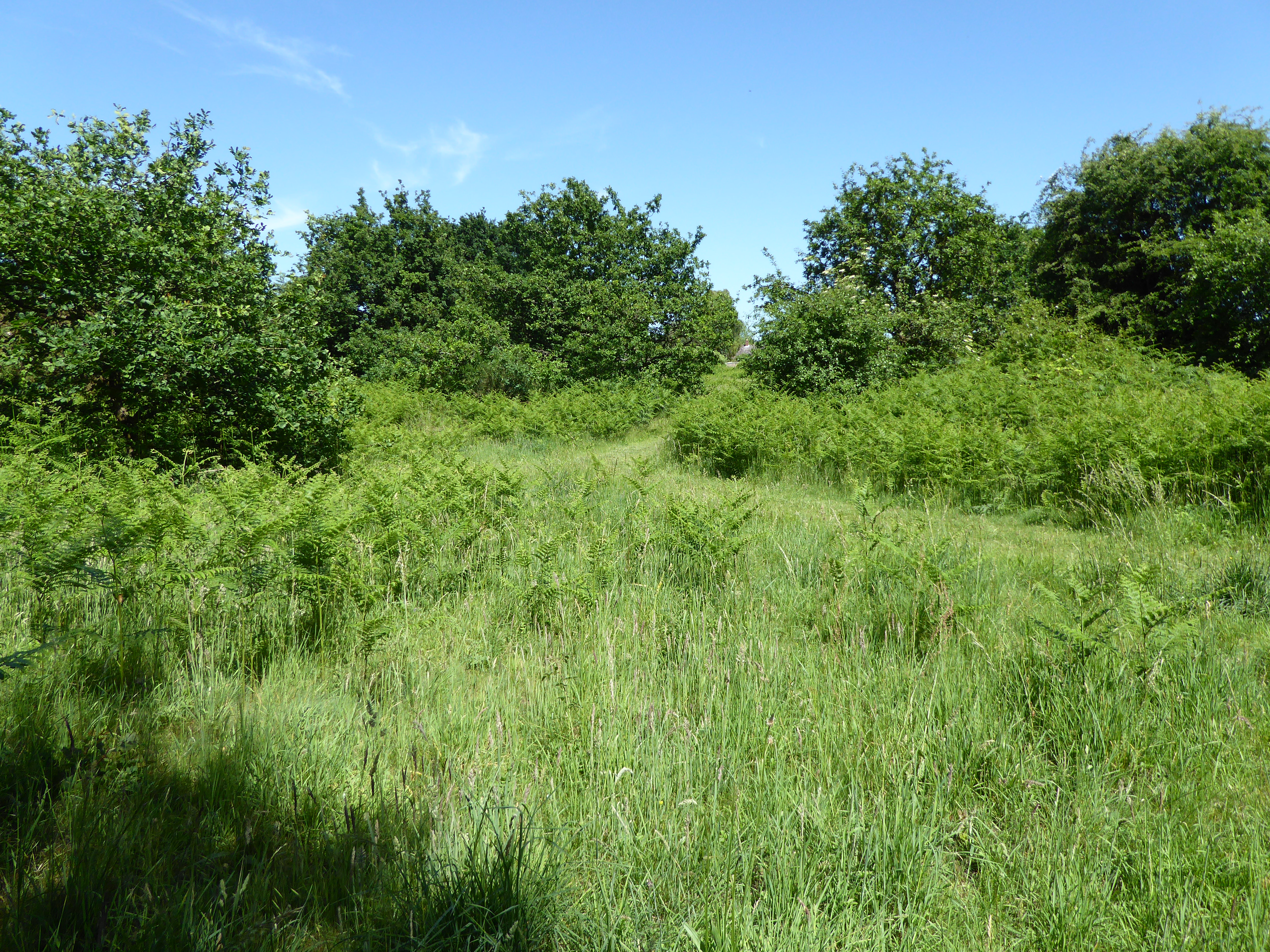
- Location of Red Lodge Heath.
- Area of search: Suffolk
- Grid reference: TL 697 700
- Interest: Biological
- Area: 20.8 hectares
- Notification date: 2005
- Location map: Magic Map

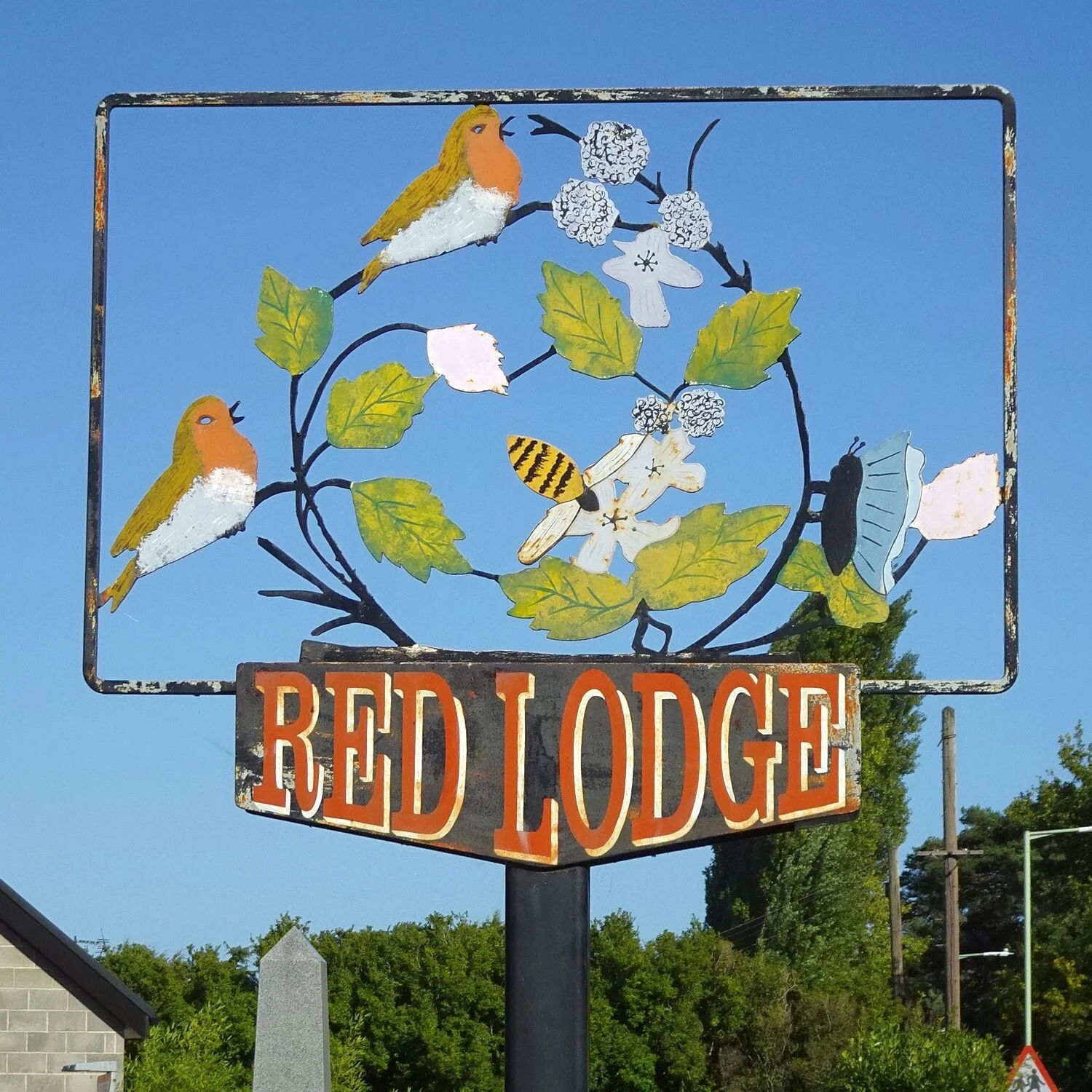

Red Lodge Heath is a 20.8-hectare (51-acre) biological Site of Special Scientific Interest in Red Lodge in Suffolk.

Habitats on this site are chalk grassland, dry acid grassland, lichen heath, wet woodland and ponds. It has nationally important assemblages of rare plants and invertebrates, including a nationally important population of the nationally rare five-banded tailed digger wasp (Cerceris quinquefasciata), also commonly known as the Five-banded weevil-wasp. It has several other invertebrate species on the IUCN Red List of Threatened Species, and plants include the nationally rare smooth rupturewort.

There is access to the site from Turnpike Road.
