= Gillis Hooftman =

Dutch merchant, banker and shipbuilder (1521–1581)

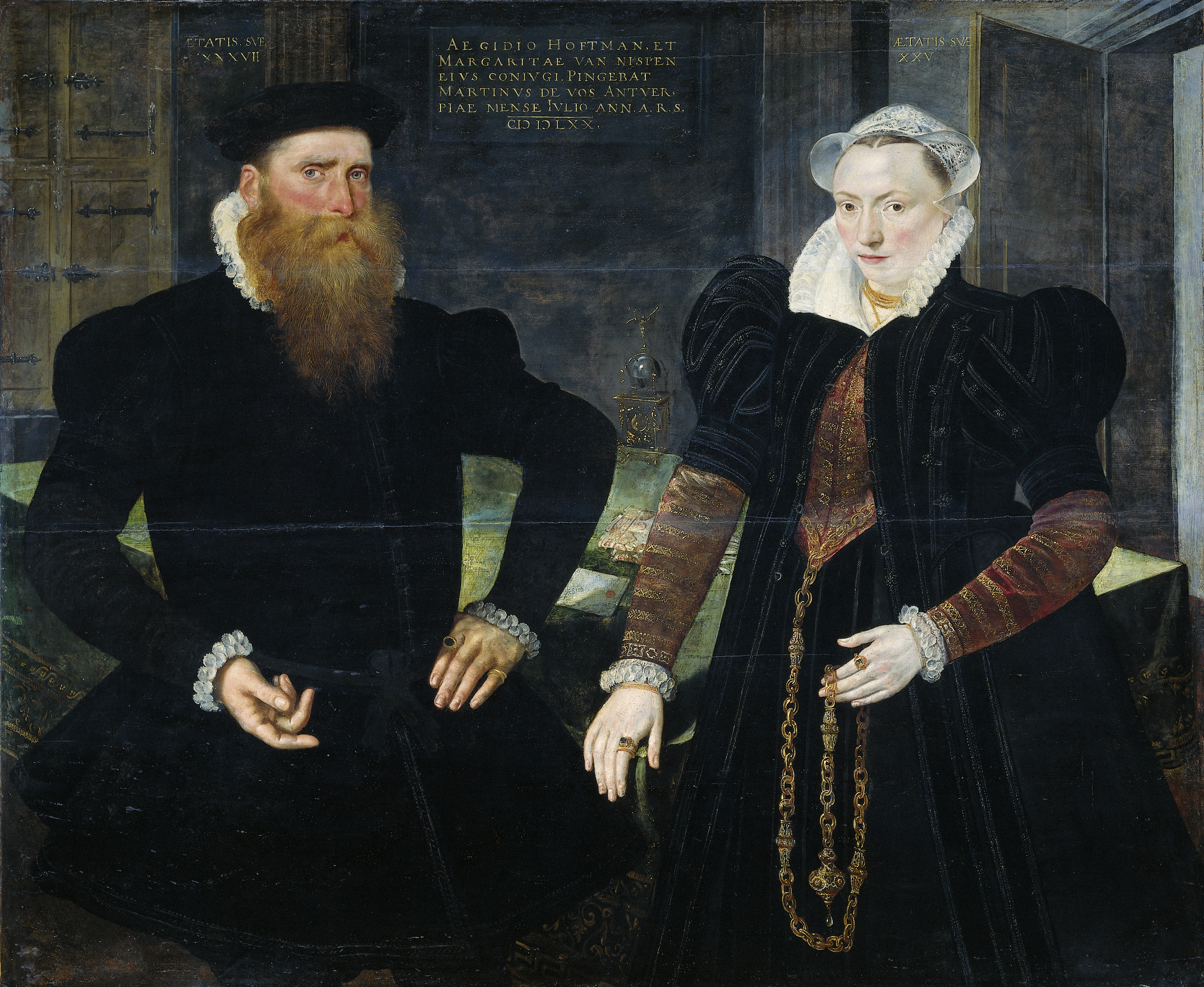
- Gillis Hooftman (left) and Margaretha van Nispen, painting by Marten de Vos
- Born: Gillis Hooftman van Eyckelberg c. 1521; Eupen, Habsburg Netherlands
- Died: 19 January 1581 (aged 59–60); Antwerp, Spanish Netherlands

Gillis Hooftman van Eyckelberg, (German: Ägidius Hauptmann; 1521 – 19 January 1581, Antwerp) was a Dutch merchant, trader, banker, and shipbuilder from the Duchy of Limburg. Hooftman was one of richest men of his time in the prosperous city of Antwerp, the trading center of the Spanish Netherlands.

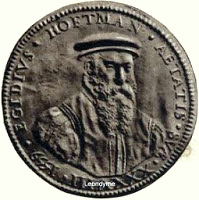
A medallion by Steven van Herwijck with a portrait of Gillis Hooftman

== Life and work ==
Gillis Hooftman was the son of Erken (Arnold) Arnt Hauptmann (d. 1545), a bailiff of the Lathof in the Stockem neighborhood of Eupen, and of Tryntgen (Katharina) Hoesch. The family originated from the Rhineland, and its earlier name of Eichelberg was changed to a Limburger form, van Eyckelberg. A fiefdom in Eupen-Stockem named after Hauptmann, as is the "Hauptmann Column" was erected to help travelers find their way through the marshlands of the High Fens.

The international trade in timber was the key to the success of his trading house. His business contacts reached as far as Russia, and eventually Hooftman was in a position to purchase several trading vessels. Sources state that Hooftman may have owned more than 100 ships at his peak. These ships sailed to ports in the Baltic Sea, and also pioneered Dutch trading with ports of the Arctic Ocean, and North Africa.

By 1559, Hooftman had become one of the richest men in Antwerp, and was living on the "Steenstraat", near the Het Steen fortress. In 1578 he bought the "Pulhof" quarter in Berchem, and in 1580, he acquired the Van Affinghem Abbey's retreat in the Mattestraat. That same year he also acquired the Cleydael Castle, and became the Landlord of Cleydael and Aartselaar. He became active in local politics, and for many years, he was a member of the Antwerp City Council.

== Family ==
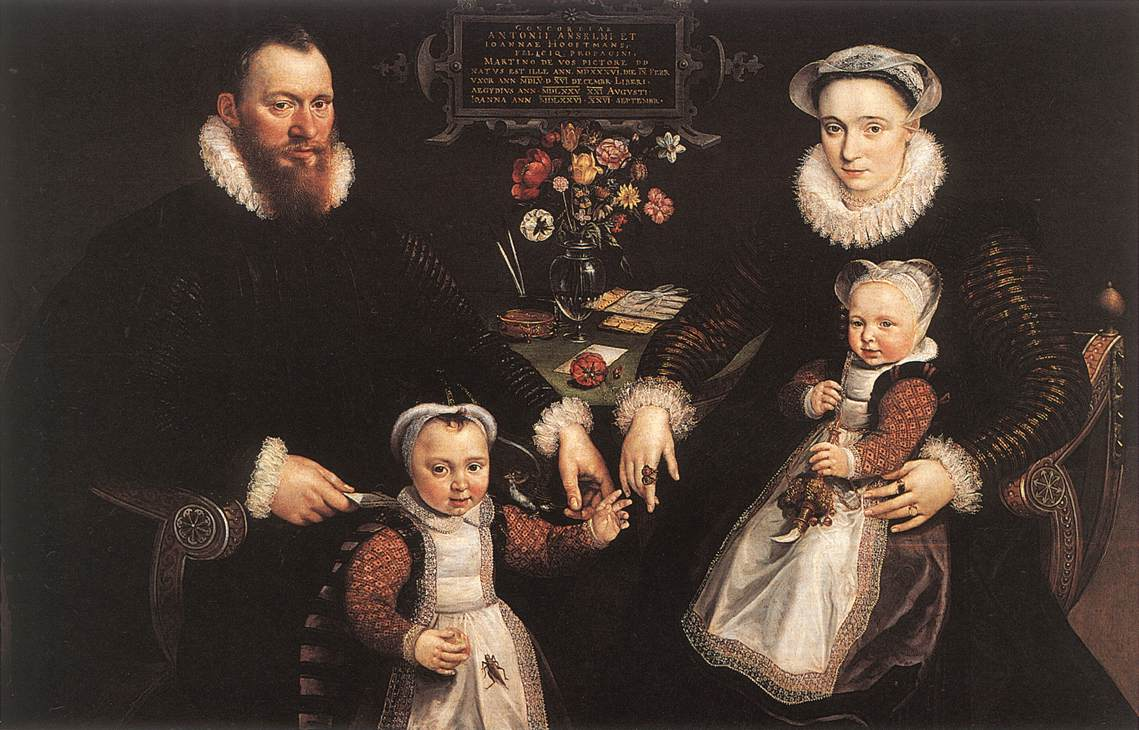
Johanna Hooftman with husband Antonio Anselmo and two children. Painting by Marten de Vos

Hooftman married three times.

Hooftman married firstly Maria Petitpas with no issue.

Hooftman married secondly his niece Anna van Achterhout (died 1562), the daughter of his brother Heinrich, with issue 4 children including:

- Johanna Hooftman (1555–97) who married the cloth merchant Antonio Anselmo. Martin de Vos painted portraits of the couple, which appear in the Royal Museums of Fine Arts of Belgium in Brussels.

On 14 February 1568 in Antwerp Cathedral, Hooftman married thirdly Margaretha van Nispen (1545–1598), a sister of Peter Paul Rubens' brother-in-law, with issue 7 children including:

- Anna Hooftman who married firstly the financier Sir Horatio Palavicino (1540–1600) and secondly, as a widow, Sir Oliver Cromwell (cir 1562–1655, the uncle of the Lord Protector)
- Beatrice Eichelberg Hooftman (died 1644) who married Philips de Soete de Laecke, Heer van Villers

On 19 January 1581, Hooftman died at Antwerp.
