= Witches of Warboys =

Event in English witchcraft

Illustration from A compleat history of magik, sorcery, and witchcraft (1715)

The 'Witches of Warboys' were Alice Samuel and her family, who were accused of and executed for witchcraft between 1589 and 1593 in the village of Warboys, in the Fens of England. It was one of many witch trials in the early modern period, but scholar Barbara Rosen claims it "attracted probably more notice than any other in the sixteenth century".

== Overview ==
The trials of the ‘witches’ occurred during the sixteenth century at Warboys in Huntingdonshire. The first allegations were made in November 1589 by Jane Throckmorton (Throgmorton), the 9-year-old daughter of Robert Throckmorton, the Squire of Warboys, when she started suffering from fits. She accused the 76-year-old Alice Samuel of being the cause; this was echoed by Jane's four sisters and some household servants who began exhibiting similar symptoms. When Alice Samuel was brought forward to the children, they became more ill and had the urge to scratch her.

Robert Throckmorton was a close friend of Sir Henry Cromwell, one of the wealthiest commoners in England and the grandfather of Oliver Cromwell. In March 1590, Lady Cromwell came to Warboys to visit and interviewed Alice Samuel in the Throckmorton house. What came after the interview served to confirm the suspicions the Throckmortons had. Lady Cromwell was tormented by Alice Samuel in her dreams, and after some time she became ill and died (buried 1592). This was enough proof to put Alice Samuel through a trial that would find her and the rest of her family guilty.

== Initial allegations ==
=== Throckmorton family ===
The first allegations declaring Alice as a practitioner of witchcraft were made in November 1589. Following this, there were a total of twelve maid-servants of the Throckmorton household (in addition to the five daughters) who experienced fits and the torment of Alice Samuell's alleged witchcraft. Jane's fits were described as such: "Sometimes she would neese [sneeze] very loud and thick for the space of half an hour together; and evidently as one in a great trance and sound lay quietly as long, soon after would begin to swell and heave up her belly so as none was able to bend her or keep her down, sometime thee would shake one leg and no other part of her, as if the palsie had been in it, sometimes the other, presently she would shake one of her arms and then the other, and soon after her head, as if she had been infected with the running palsie".

Jane's mother and grandmother were by the child's side while other neighbors came to see her. When Alice Samuel came in, the child proclaimed: "Grandmother look where the old witch sitteth (pointing to Samuel) did you ever see one more like a witch than she is: Take off her black thrumbed [shaggy or fringed] cap, for I cannot abide to look on her". Jane's mother thought nothing of this at first, thinking her child was sleep deprived and sick. However, because Jane continued to get worse, her parents sent her urine to Doctor Barrow of Cambridge, who sent medicine to Jane three separate times thinking it would heal her. It did not. After the third time, the Doctor inquired whether there were any signs of sorcery or witchcraft involved that the parents could see. Jane's urine was then sent to a family acquaintance, Master Butler, for examination and he sent back the same remedies that Doctor Barrow had sent. Exactly a month later, on the same day almost to the hour, two more of Master Throckmorton's daughters fell sick to the same illness that was afflicting Jane.

These daughters, two to three years older than Jane, cried out: "Take her away, look where she standeth here before us in a black thrumbed cap it is she that hath bewitched us and she will kill us if you do not take her away".

The parents were then worried, but could not understand why any such harm would come to them, for they had only moved into the town the "Michaelmas before" (September 29, 1588). Their youngest daughter, nine years old, fell sick less than a month later. Soon after this, the oldest daughter, fifteen years old, fell sick. She was sickest out of the five. Both cried out against Alice Samuell. Their eldest sister, having been the strongest, strived with the spirit, and was grievously tortured not being able to overcome it. This caused her to "(neese), screech and groan very fearfully, sometimes it would heave up her belly and bounce up her body with such violence that she was not kept upon her bed". When sitting in a chair, her fits often caused her to break that chair.

The daughters could not see, hear or feel while in these fits. They accused Mother Samuell, asking for her to be taken away. These fits would sometimes last for half a day and happened up to six or seven times a day. They believed that God freed them of this sorcery and afterwards, the sisters remembered nothing of what they had been saying.

=== Lady Cromwell ===
In March 1590, Lady Cromwell and Alice had a discussion regarding the accusations made against Alice. During this conversation, Lady Cromwell reportedly grabbed a pair of scissors and cut a lock of hair off Alice, and gave it to Mrs. Throckmorton to burn (a folk remedy believed to weaken a witch's power). That night, Lady Cromwell had nightmares, became ill and later died in 1592.

== Trial ==
Following the death of Lady Cromwell, a local parson convinced Alice to admit to witchcraft, which she retracted the very next day. However, she confessed again when she was brought before the Bishop of Lincoln, and taken to Huntingdon where she was imprisoned with her daughter and husband. The family was tried in April 1593 for the murder by witchcraft of Lady Cromwell. Alice's words to Lady Cromwell ("Madam, why do you use me thus? I never did you any harm as yet") were used against her at the trial, and all three were found guilty and eventually hanged.

== Posthumous proof ==
The jailer and his wife examined the corpses.

[H]e found upon the body of the old woman Alice Samuel a little lump of flesh, in manner sticking out as if it had been a teat, to the length of half an inch; which both he and his wife perceiving, at the first sight thereof meant not to disclose because it was adjoining so secret a place which was not decent to be seen. Yet in the end, not willing to conceal so strange a matter, and decently covering that privy place a little above which it grew, they made open show thereof unto diverse that stood by.

Historian Jim Kermode argues that the discovery of a witches' mark (also known as a "devil's mark") was important legal proof at this period in England. "[I]t gradually became accepted that the mark, with women, most commonly took the form of a teat-like growth in the pudenda".

This tale of the jailer's postmortem examination has been widely quoted in modern scholarship, for example with reference to the animal/human divide, the "sado-erotic fascination of the witches' teat", and particularly in feminist interpretations of the Early Modern witch trials. It is also cited by writers such as Lynn Picknett.

== Aftermath ==
The scholar George Kittredge (1860–1941) called the Warboys trial "the most momentous witch-trial that had ever occurred in England", partially because it had "demonstrably produced a deep and lasting impression on the class that made laws". He makes a case that the Warboys trial influenced the passage of the Witchcraft Act 1603.

Following the hangings, Robert Throckmorton left Warboys hastily, his wife allegedly dying shortly before his departure.

== In culture ==
In Kate Pullinger's 1999 novel, Weird Sister, Agnes Samuel returns to the present day to terrorise the Throckmorton family, who still reside in Warboys but have no memory of the events of the late 16th century.
