= Horatio Palavicino =

Sir Horatio Palavicino (c. 1540 – 5 July 1600), born in Italy, was a financier and political agent in England.

== Life ==
Palavicino came from a celebrated Italian family, the elder branch of which possessed a district on the Po called the Stato Pallavicino, while the younger branch settled at Genoa; several members of it were appointed regents of Genoa by the Dukes of Milan, and more than one became a cardinal. One was in the service of the English kings, Henry VIII and Edward VI.

Horatio's parents were Tobias Palavicino and his wife Battina; the family handled the papal monopoly of alum, used for dyeing. Horatio was born in Genoa, and is thought to have been sent to Antwerp as an agent for the family firm. Later he moved to England, where he was recommended to Queen Mary, and appointed collector of papal taxes. On Mary's death, Palavicino, according to tradition, renounced his Roman Catholic faith, and, appropriating the sums he had collected for the Pope, laid the foundations of an enormous fortune. Devoting himself to commercial enterprise, he seems to have extended his business operations to most quarters of the globe.

=== Financial agent, and political intelligence from abroad ===
The wealth he thus acquired made him an important financial agent. He lent largely to Queen Elizabeth, Henry of Navarre, and the Netherlands, and always at a usurious interest; so greatly was Elizabeth indebted to him that the fate of the kingdom was said to have depended upon him; while on one occasion he furnished Henry of Navarre with no less than one hundred thousand French crowns. Palavicino was also a dealer in luxury goods. He sold suites of tapestry to Thomas Radclyffe, 3rd Earl of Sussex for the withdrawing chamber and privy chamber used by Elizabeth I at Newhall.

Palavicino's position as a collector of political intelligence was equally important, and his numerous commercial correspondents frequently enabled him to forestall all other sources of information. He was himself often employed by the government to furnish intelligence from abroad; he was acting in this capacity in 1581. In June he appears to have experienced some trouble for refusing to go to church. In 1583 he was at Paris befriending William Parry.

In April 1584 Richard Hakluyt wrote to Francis Walsingham that Palavicino was willing to join in the western voyage. In 1585, when Philip Howard, Earl of Arundel, was imprisoned, he sought the aid of Palavicino, as being "an honest man", in preparing his defence. On 7 February 1585–6, Palavicino was recommended by Burghley to Leicester in the Low Countries, and in the same year, he was granted a patent of denization. In 1587 he was knighted by Elizabeth.

=== The Spanish Armada, and political intrigue ===
Early in 1588 he was in Germany; he returned before the summer, and asked to serve against the Spanish Armada. He was consulted by Burghley about raising money to meet the invasion, equipped a vessel at his own cost, and was present as a volunteer during the operations in the Channel and at Calais. It is generally stated that he commanded a vessel against the Armada, and his portrait was among the captains commemorated in the House of Lords' Tapestry; but his name does not appear in the list of captains.

In the following October Palavicino attempted on his own account a political intrigue, in which the English government was probably not implicated, though Walsingham may have suggested some such scheme to Palavicino. He wrote to Alexander Farnese, the Spanish commander in the Netherlands, suggesting a scheme by which Alexander was to assume the sovereignty of the Netherlands to the exclusion of Philip, was to guarantee the Cautionary Towns to Elizabeth until her advances to the Dutch had been repaid, and to receive the support and perpetual alliance of England. Alexander rejected these proposals with indignation, declaring that had Palavicino recommended them in person he would have killed him; he sent a detailed account of the affair to Philip, who suggested that Palavicino should be invited to Flanders, and should be punished after he had disclosed all the information he could.

In February 1589–90, Palavicino was sent into Germany, with an allowance of 50 shillings a day for diet; in July he went as envoy to the French king; in November he was again in Germany, which he revisited in 1591 and 1592, maintaining a correspondence with the government, Sir Thomas Bodley, ambassador at the Hague, and other diplomatists. His principal business was the negotiation of loans for the English and Dutch governments. In 1594 he once more applied for license to go abroad, but his active employment ceased soon afterwards, and he retired to his manor of Babraham, near Cambridge. He died at Babraham in July 1600, and was buried there. His will is given in the "Calendar of State Papers". The Queen owed him nearly £29,000, which subsequently formed a matter of frequent dispute between his sons and the government, and was never fully paid.

== Family ==
While in the Low Countries Palavicino married a certain "very mean person", whom he did not wish to acknowledge as his wife while his father was alive; they had one son, Edward, who, in deference to the wish of his second wife, he declared illegitimate and disinherited.

Many years after his first wife's death Palavicino married in Frankfurt, on 27 April 1591, Anne, daughter of Gillis Hooftman of Antwerp; she received patent of denization in England in the following year. With her Palavicino had two sons and a daughter: Henry, who died on 14 October 1615, without issue; and Tobie, who was born on 20 May 1593 at Babraham. Tobie squandered his father's wealth, was imprisoned in the Fleet, and died, leaving three sons and a daughter.

Palavicino's family became closely connected with the Cromwells by a remarkable series of marriages. His widow, a year and a day after his death, married Sir Oliver Cromwell, the Protector's great-uncle; the two sons, Henry and Tobie, married, on 10 April 1606, Sir Oliver's two daughters by a previous marriage, Catharine and Jane; and the daughter, Baptina, married Sir Oliver's eldest son and heir, Henry. Subsequently, another family member, Peter Palavicino, came to England as a merchant, was knighted on 19 June 1687, and died in February 1694.
