= Robert Cromwell =

English politician

Robert Cromwell MP
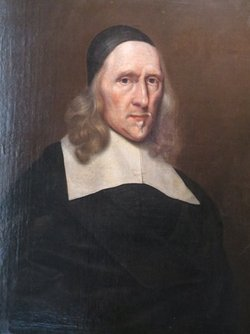
- Called 'Robert Cromwell (d.1617)', c. 1650, Robert Walker (circle of)

Member of Parliament for Huntingdon
- In office 1593 – October 1597 Serving with Robert Lee
- Preceded by: Francis Flower
- Succeeded by: Richard Cromwell

Personal details
- Born: c. 1560 Huntingdon, England
- Died: 1617 Huntingdon, England
- Resting place: All Saints Churchyard, Huntingdon
- Spouse: Elizabeth Steward
- Relations: Cromwell family
- Children: Oliver Cromwell
- Parent(s): Henry Cromwell; Joan Warren
- Occupation: Politician

Robert Cromwell (c. 1560–1617) was an English politician who was the father of Oliver Cromwell. He represented Huntingdon in the English House of Commons. He was a man of sober Puritanism. He married Elizabeth Steward around 1590. They had 10 children, seven girls and three boys, but the only boy to survive infancy was Oliver Cromwell. Upon the death of his father Henry Williams (alias Cromwell), Cromwell inherited a small estate in Huntingdon. Cromwell was buried in All Saints, Huntingdon on 24 June 1617.

== See also ==
- List of MPs elected to the English parliament in 1593
