= Henry Cromwell (alias Williams) =

English politician and member of the Cromwell family

Henry Cromwell alias Williams (c.1566–1630) was an English politician and member of the Cromwell family. He represented Huntingdon in the Parliament of England.

Cromwell was born in Upwood in Huntingdonshire and was the third son of Henry Williams and an uncle of Oliver Cromwell.

== See also ==
- List of MPs elected to the English parliament in 1604

Parliament of England
Preceded by William Beecher; Thomas Chichley	Member of Parliament for Huntingdon; 1604; With: Thomas Harley	Succeeded by Sir Christopher Hatton; Miles Fleetwood
