= Warboys =

Village in Cambridgeshire, England

Coordinates: 52.4°N 0.07°W

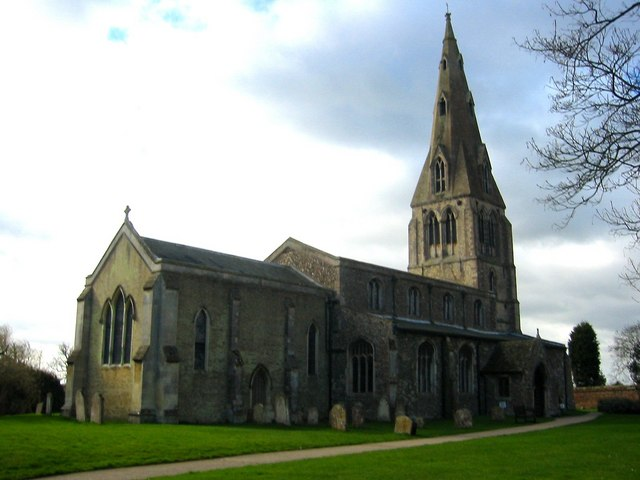
- St Mary Magdalene, Warboys

- Location within Cambridgeshire
- Population: 4,323 (2021)
- OS grid reference: TL315797
- Civil parish: Warboys
- District: Huntingdonshire
- Shire county: Cambridgeshire
- Region: East
- Country: England
- Sovereign state: United Kingdom
- Post town: HUNTINGDON
- Postcode district: PE28
- Dialling code: 01487
- Police: Cambridgeshire
- Fire: Cambridgeshire
- Ambulance: East of England
- UK Parliament: Huntingdon

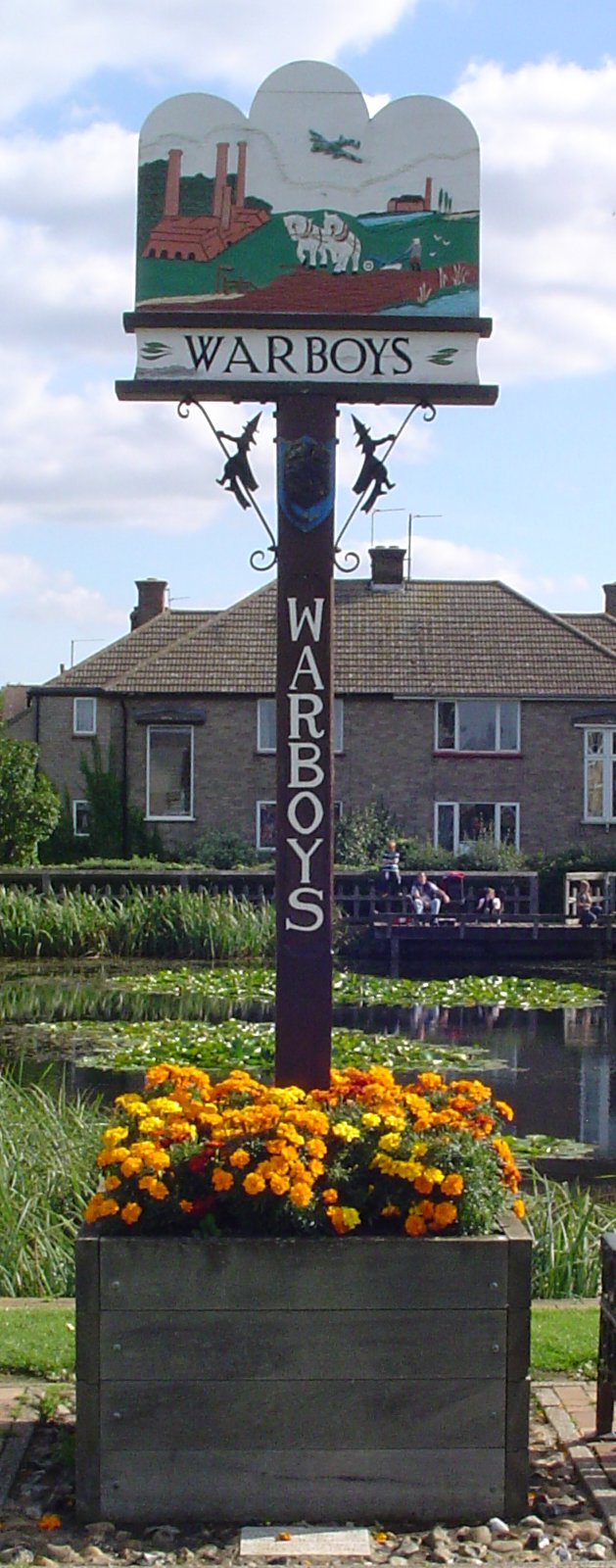
Village sign in Warboys

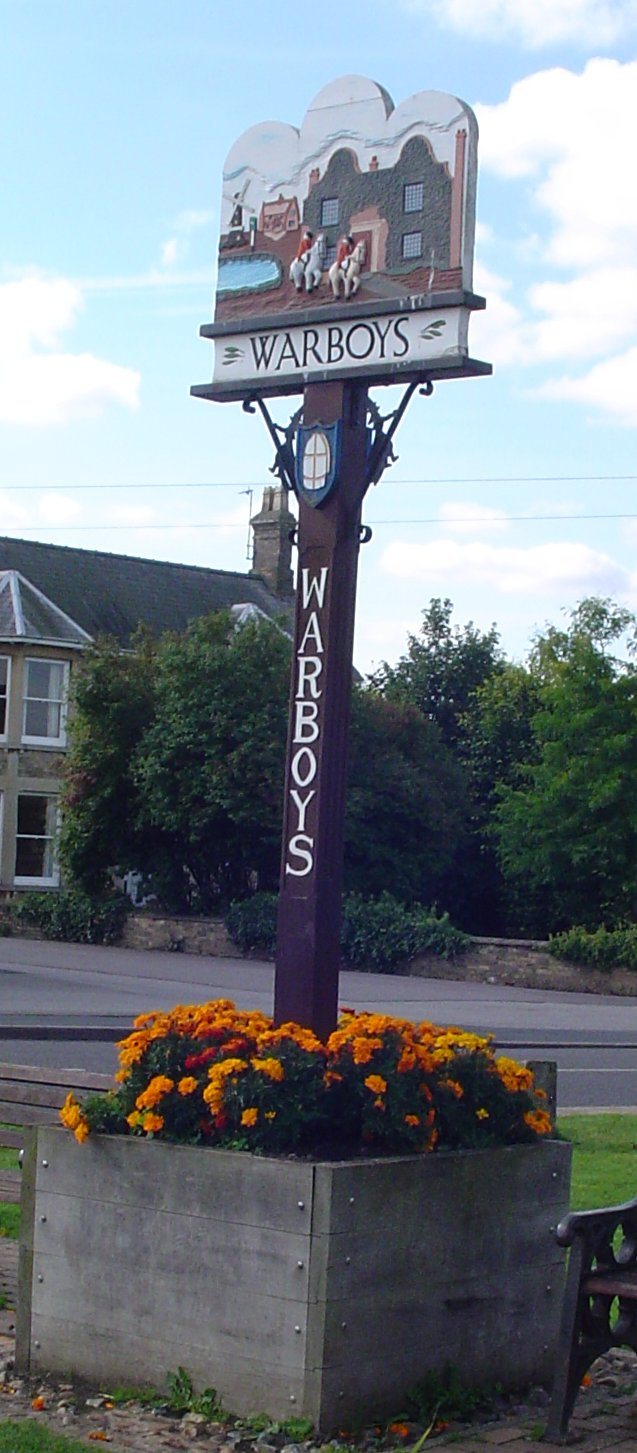
The other side of the village sign

Warboys is a large village and civil parish in the Huntingdonshire district of Cambridgeshire, England, 7 miles (11 km) north-east of Huntingdon.

== Geology ==
Igneous diorite rocks are located around 561–712 feet (171–217 m) below ground at Warboys. Discovered in the 1960s, it is suspected that these rocks form the remnants of a volcano of the Hercynian Orogeny (+300 MYA).

== History ==
Warboys is a large parish and a village on what was the eastern side of Huntingdonshire bordering on Cambridgeshire.

The place-name 'Warboys' is first attested in a Saxon charter of 974, where it appears as Wardebusc and Weardebusc. The name is perhaps from the Old Norse vardi and buski, and means 'beacon with bushes'. "Wearda" was also an Old English personal name, and it has been suggested this word means, literally, "bush of a man called Wearda", or, that the first element is from the Old English "weard" ('watch, protection'). Additionally, the first Norman family to settle there was named Wardebois, whom, initially, according to John Leland, were named Verbois, from Verboys, near Rouen. The Verbois were known as the Wardebois, from at least 1199 to 1322. After this period, the town's name shifted to Warbois, then, finally, Warboys.

=== Warboys in the Domesday Book ===
Warboys was listed in the Domesday Book (Note: In 1085, William the Conqueror ordered that a survey should be carried out across his kingdom to discover who owned which parts and what it was worth. The survey took place in 1086 and the results were recorded in what, since the 12th century, has become known as the Domesday Book. Starting with the King himself, for each landholder within a county there is a list of their estates or manors; and, for each manor, there is a summary of the resources of the manor, the amount of annual rent that was collected by the lord of the manor both in 1066 and in 1086, together with the taxable value.) in the Hundred of Hurstingstone in Huntingdonshire; the name of the settlement was again written as Wardebusc in the Domesday Book. In 1086 there was just one manor at Warboys; the annual rent paid to the lord of the manor in 1066 had been £12 and the rent was the same in 1086.

The Domesday Book does not explicitly give the population of a place, but it records that there were 48 households at Warboys. Estimating 3.5–5.0 people per household, (Note: There is no consensus on the average size of a household in 1086; estimates range from 3.5–5.0 people per household.) the 1086 population of Warboys was between 168–240 people. The survey records that there were nineteen ploughlands (Note: The Domesday Book uses a number of units of measure for areas of land that are now unfamiliar, such as hides and ploughlands. In different parts of the country, these were terms for the area of land that a team of eight oxen could plough in a single season and are equivalent to 120 acres (49 hectares); this was the amount of land that was considered to be sufficient to support a single family. By 1086, the hide had become a unit of tax assessment rather than an actual land area; a hide was the amount of land that could be assessed as £1 for tax purposes.) at Warboys in 1086 and that there was the capacity for a further ploughland. In addition to the arable land, there were 3 acres (1 hectare) of meadows and 3,784 acres (1,531 hectares) of woodland at Warboys.

The tax assessment in the Domesday Book was known as geld or danegeld, and was a type of land-tax based on the hide or ploughland. It was originally a way of collecting a tribute to pay off the Danes when they attacked England, and was only levied when necessary. Following the Norman Conquest, the geld was used to raise money for the King and to pay for continental wars; by 1130, the geld was being collected annually. Having determined the value of a manor's land and other assets, a tax of so many shillings and pence per pound of value would be levied on the land holder. While this was typically two shillings in the pound the amount did vary; for example, in 1084 it was as high as six shillings in the pound. For the manor at Warboys the total tax assessed was ten geld.

By 1086 there was already a church and a priest at Warboys and it was amongst the lands of the Abbey of St. Benedict at Ramsey.

=== Situation ===
The north-east part is fenland, with the higher land to the south composed of stiff clay. The land falls from about 114 feet (35 m) above sea-level in the south to 2 feet (1 m) in the fenland of the north and north-east. Nearly 3/4 of the area is arable upon which potatoes are largely grown, and also corn and beans, etc. Warboys Wood is the only remaining piece of woodland.

The village lies on high ground in the south-west part of the parish overlooking the fen to the north-east. It has grown up at the foot of a fork formed at the junction of the main road from St. Ives to Ramsey, with a branch road leading eastwards over Warboys Heath on to Fenton. The main road, as it passes through the village, is called Church Street, and the branch road is High Street. The church is at the south end of the village. There are three or four old cottages in the village, including the White Hart Inn on the north side of the High Street – a 17th century brick house with a thatched roof. In 1996 an electrical fault caused the roof to catch fire, destroying the top storey of the building. The pub was rebuilt and opened again in 1997.

In 1774 an Act of Parliament was passed for draining certain lands in Warboys, including 300 acres (121 ha) called High Fen and 60 acres (24 ha) part of New Pasture. In 1795, an Act was passed for dividing, enclosing and draining the open common fields in Warboys. A further Act was passed in 1798 to amend the previous Act as regards the lands allotted in lieu of tithes.

A local landmark is the clock tower, built in 1887 to celebrate the Golden Jubilee of Queen Victoria on the throne. Warboys is also famous for the trial of the so-called "Witches of Warboys". Much witch-related iconography can be found in the village, including part of the emblem of the local primary school.

=== Local English dialect ===
The village was one of two sites in Huntingdonshire included in the Survey of English Dialects (SED). The other was Kimbolton.

The traditional dialect of Warboys recorded in the SED was characterised by a 'Canadian raising' type alternation in the vowel of the PRICE lexical set.

=== RAF Warboys ===
During the Second World War the RAF operated a bomber airfield just south-west of the village, RAF Warboys. Wellingtons operated there from 1942 until early 1943 when they were replaced by Lancasters. After early 1944, the airfield was used for training until flying operations ended late in 1945. All the buildings and land were sold by 1964.

== Government ==
As a civil parish, Warboys has a parish council. The parish council is elected by the residents of the parish who have registered on the electoral roll; the parish council is the lowest tier of government in England. A parish council is responsible for providing and maintaining a variety of local services including allotments and a cemetery; grass cutting and tree planting within public open spaces such as a village green or playing fields. The parish council reviews all planning applications that might affect the parish and makes recommendations to Huntingdonshire District Council, which is the local planning authority for the parish. The parish council also represents the views of the parish on issues such as local transport, policing and the environment. The parish council raises its own tax to pay for these services, known as the parish precept, which is collected as part of the council tax. The parish council consists of fifteen elected councillors and has a parish clerk. The parish precept for the financial year ending 31 March 2015 was £86, 140.

Warboys was in the historic and administrative county of Huntingdonshire until 1965. From 1965, the village was part of the new administrative county of Huntingdon and Peterborough. Then in 1974, following the Local Government Act 1972, Warboys became a part of the county of Cambridgeshire.

The second tier of local government is Huntingdonshire District Council, which is a non-metropolitan district of Cambridgeshire and has its headquarters in Huntingdon. Huntingdonshire District Council has 52 councillors representing 29 district wards. Huntingdonshire District Council collects the council tax, and provides services such as building regulations, local planning, environmental health, leisure and tourism. Warboys is a part of the district ward of Warboys and Bury and is represented on the district council by two councillors. District councillors serve for four-year terms following elections to Huntingdonshire District Council.

For Warboys the highest tier of local government is Cambridgeshire County Council, which has administration buildings in Cambridge. The county council provides county-wide services such as major road infrastructure, fire and rescue, education, social services, libraries and heritage services. Cambridgeshire County Council consists of 69 councillors representing 60 electoral divisions. Warboys is part of the electoral division of Warboys and Upwood and is represented on the county council by one councillor.

At Westminster, Warboys is in the parliamentary constituency of Huntingdon, and elects one Member of Parliament (MP) by the first past the post system of election. Warboys is represented in the House of Commons by Ben Obese-Jecty (Conservative). Prior to the 2023 boundary review, Warboys was part of North West Cambridgeshire and represented in parliament by Shailesh Vara.

== Demography ==
=== Population ===
In the period 1801 to 1901 the population of Warboys was recorded every ten years by the UK census. During this time the population was in the range of 943 (the lowest was in 1801) and 1996 (the highest was in 1851).

From 1901, a census was taken every ten years with the exception of 1941 (due to the Second World War).

Parish	1911	1921	1931	1951	1961	1971	1981	1991	2001	2011
Warboys	1790	1720	1593	1909	1950	1923	2878	3096	3866	3994

All population census figures from report Historic Census figures Cambridgeshire to 2011 by Cambridgeshire Insight.

In 2011, the parish covered an area of 9,046 acres (3,661 hectares) and the population density of Warboys in 2011 was 282. 6 persons per square mile (109. 1 per square kilometre).

== Culture and community ==
=== Warboys Youth Action ===
Warboys Youth Action is a charity established in 1993 and exists to promote the moral, physical and spiritual well-being of those between 11 and 18 years of age who live in the parish. With a reputation as the provider of a youth club which was housed in part of the old school at the rear of the library. The Youthie building is not currently being used due to building subsidence. The future of the Youthie building is currently under discussion, it has now been closed since 2010.

== Religious sites ==
=== St Mary Magdalene Church ===
The church of St Mary Magdalene, formerly of the Blessed Mary the Virgin, consists of a chancel, nave, north aisle, south aisle, west tower, north and south porches.

Nothing now remains of the church which existed as the time of the Domesday survey of 1086. The earliest church of which there is now evidence was built in the middle of the 12th century, probably when the church and its possessions were granted by Abbot Walter to the almonry of Ramsey Abbey. This church consisted of the present nave and a north aisle. The chancel arch, the responds at each end of the north aisle and a small piece of walling at the south-west corner of the nave of this church still survive.

Early in the 13th century, the Norman north aisle, with the arcade, was rebuilt and immediately after, the south aisle with its arcade was added. In the middle of the 13th century the west tower, with its broached spire of ashlar, was built, and it was evidently intended at this date to extend the aisles westwards to the line of the west wall of the tower. If this intention was then carried out, the south extension was rebuilt in the latter part of the 14th century when the south porch was added. The north extension was also rebuilt in the early part of the 15th century when the north porch was added.

The chancel was rebuilt and shortened before the beginning of the 19th century and, in 1832, it was extended eastwards apparently to its original length and considerably altered. At this date large galleries were erected in both aisles and the tower, the floor being lowered a foot to give headroom under them. The east wall above the chancel arch, and west wall of the tower, were cased in lath and plaster, a vestry was formed at the west end of the north aisle, all the walls were coated with thick plaster and wooden mouldings fixed below the clearstory window and in other places. The spire was restored in 1898 and in 1926 the tower and south aisle were underpinned. The additions of 1832 (except those to the chancel) were removed and the floor restored to its former level.

From 2007 to 2010 further reordering took place with the interior to assist the worship to be more flexible and to give more opportunity for the building to be more versatile and comfortable. The 1927 pews were removed, in 2007, to be replaced by moveable chairs, the organ was overhauled and restored and moved to a new location to the west of the north door. A raised platform was installed in front of the chancel steps. The font was moved from the central location of the aisle to a position to the east of the south door. The chancel saw some changes, with the front choristers' book rests being relocated to become the communion rail in front of the altar and the front choristers' benches replaced by chairs. The 1927 electric heating was replaced, in 2010, by gas central heating, and the front of the building carpeted.

=== Baptist Church ===
The Baptist Church came into being in 1644. The current chapel was built in 1831 and in 1899 it was modified to broadly that seen today. The chapel became well known because of its baptisms in the weir (village pond); in 1905 approximately 3000 people came to watch the baptisms at the weir.

=== Methodist Church ===
Warboys Methodist Church was originally a wooden chapel built in 1900. In 1938 it was replaced by the current brick-built chapel, which was brought brick by brick from Great Raveley.

== Sport and leisure ==
Warboys has a Non-League football club Warboys Town F.C. who play at Forge Way. The club are currently members of the Peterborough & District League Premier Division
