= All Saints' Church, Huntingdon =

Coordinates: 52.3308°N 0.1850°W

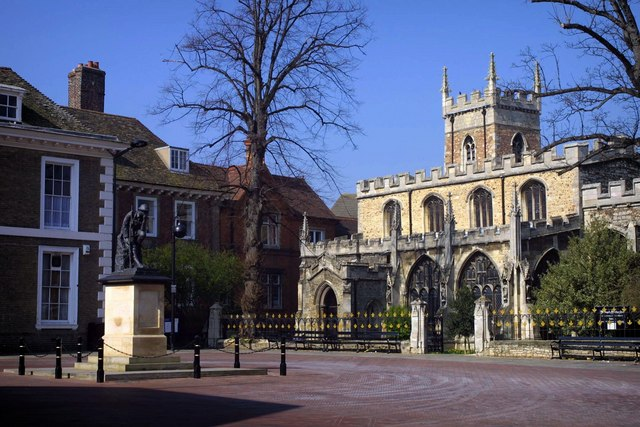
All Saints' Church, Huntingdon

All Saints' Church is a Church of England church located in Huntingdon, Cambridgeshire, England. There have been multiple churches on the site of this one. The earliest mention of a church dates to 973 AD with the original dedication having been to either St Mary, or The Blessed Virgin and All Martyrs.

The chancel is Early English Period, but the main structure is in the Late Perpendicular Gothic style, dating from about the reign of Henry VII, and rebuilt in 1620. It was restored under the direction of Sir George Gilbert Scott when new oak roofs were added, and the old carving, retained wherever possible, or faithfully reproduced. It consists of chancel, nave, aisles, south porch and a western tower of Perpendicular era, containing four bells. There are several stained windows, a pulpit of carved alabaster around which runs an elaborate railing of metal work, in which a combination of copper, brass and tin has been used, the whole resting on a stone base. The font is of carved stone supported on columns of jasper, Irish and foreign marbles. There is a large organ with three rows of keys and containing between thirty and forty stops. The stalls are of carved oak, interspersed with walnut and cedar. A reredos of carved oak, enriched with figures, niches and canopies, was erected in the 1800s. The vestry was enlarged and ornamented with caning. The church has seating for about 500 persons.

The registers of the parish of St John Baptist, brought here at the demolition of the church of that name, date from 1585; those of All Saints are from 1558. The celebrated entry of the baptism of Oliver Cromwell occurs in the register of St John's under the date of 1599, and there is a mention, about twenty years later, of his having done penance for some improper conduct. The name of Cromwell frequently occurs: Robert Cromwell father of the Protector, was buried in the church, 24 June 1617. There is also mention made of the resting within its walls of the body of Mary Queen of Scots on its way from Peterborough Cathedral to Westminster Abbey, to which latter place it was removed by order of her son, James I.

== See also ==
- List of churches in Huntingdonshire
