= Richard Cromwell (MP) =

17th-century English politician

Richard Cromwell (1572–1628) was an English politician and member of the Cromwell family. He represented Huntingdon and Lostwithiel in the Parliament of England.

Cromwell was born in Upwood in Huntingdonshire and was the fourth son of Henry Williams and an uncle of Oliver Cromwell.

== See also ==
- List of MPs elected to the English parliament in 1601
- List of MPs elected to the English parliament in 1597
