= Henry Williams (alias Cromwell) =

Knight and grandfather of Oliver Cromwell

The Honourable Sir Henry Williams alias Cromwell
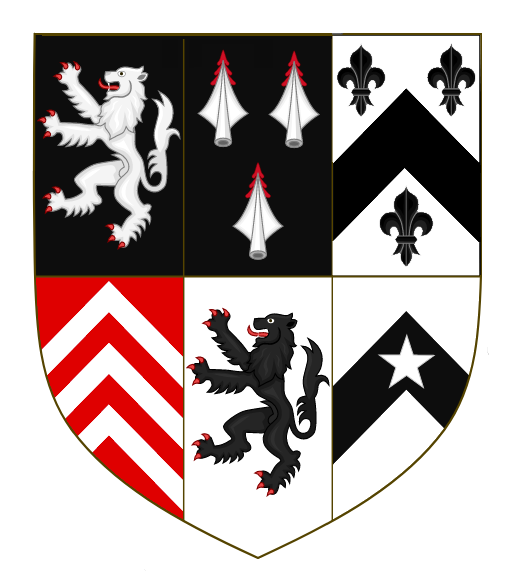
- Arms of Sir Henry Williams alias Cromwell:– Quarterly of six – 1, Sable, a lion rampant Argent; 2, Sable, three spear-heads Argent, their points imbrued Gules; 3, Argent, a chevron between three fleurs de lys Sable; 4, Gules, three chevronels Argent; 5, Argent, a lion rampant Sable; 6, Argent, on a chevron Sable, a mullet of the field Argent.
- Born: Henry Cromwell alias Williams; 1537
- Died: 6 January 1604 (aged 66–67)
- Resting place: All Saints' Church, Huntingdon; 52.3308°N 0.1850°W
- Occupation: MP
- Spouses: Joan Warren; Susan Weeks
- Children: with Joan: Oliver; Robert; Henry; Richard; Philip; Ralph; Joan; Elizabeth; Frances; Mary; Dorothy
- Parent(s): Sir Richard Williams; Frances Murfyn
- Relatives: Francis Williams (alias Cromwell) (brother)

Sir Henry Williams (1537 – 6 January 1604), also known as Sir Henry Cromwell, was a knight of the shire (MP) for Huntingdonshire during the reign of Elizabeth I. He was the grandfather of the Protector, Oliver Cromwell.

== Early life ==
Sir Henry Williams, alias Cromwell, was of Welsh descent, the eldest son and heir of Sir Richard Williams (c. 1510–1544) and Frances (c. 1520–c. 1543), daughter of Thomas Murfyn. His grandfather, Morgan ap William, was the son of a man named William, and also used the name Williams, but his father abandoned the Welsh patronymic system completely and adopted the name of Cromwell, in honour of an uncle Thomas Cromwell, 1st Earl of Essex. The family then consistently used and wrote its name as "Williams, alias Cromwell", well into the 17th century. (Note: Noble 1787, pp. 11–13 explains the reason for Sir Richard Williams, the great grandfather of Oliver Cromwell, changing his name, from Williams to Cromwell: "Henry VIII strongly recommended it to the Welsh (whom he incorporated with the English) to adopt the English practice in taking family names, instead of their manner of adding their father's, and perhaps grandfather's name to their own Christian one with nap or ap, as Morgan ap William, or Rich, ap Morgan ap William; i.e. Rich, the son of Morgan the son of Will, and the king was the more anxious as it was found so inconvenient in identifying persons in judicial matters. For these reasons, the Welsh, about this time, dropped the ap in many of their names; or, if it could be done with convenience as to pronunciation, left out the a, and joined the p to their father's Christian name (Camden's remains; from which it appears that many Christian names were appropriated to families; for the reasons above "we have the Williams's, Lewis's, Morgans, &c. &c. without number, and, by joining the p, the Pritchards, Powels, Parrys, i. e. ap Richard, ap Howell, ap Harry, &c. &c.). Thus Mr. Morgan ap William, Sir Richard's father, seems, from the pedigree, to have taken the family name of Williams; but, as the surname of Williams was of so late standing, his majesty recommended it to Sir Richard, to use that of Cromwell, in honour of his uncle Thomas Cromwell, 1st Earl of Essex, whose present greatness entirely obliterated his former meanness (Various lives of Oliver, lord protector, &c. as also miss Cromwell's pedigree); and it is observable, that Sir Richard's brothers also changed their name to Cromwell (Will of Sir Richard Williams, alias Cromwell, prerogative-office, London, Allan 20. Pedigree of the Williams's, alias Cromwells, Harl. M.S.S. vol. 1174, and Harl. M.S.S. vol. 4135). Thus did the Williams's take, or super-add the surname of Cromwell to that of Williams; and, in almost all their deeds and wills, they constantly wrote themselves Williams, alias Cromwell, down to the seventeenth century. Though the cause of this change is well known, the time is not: many writers pretend the name of Cromwell was not taken up until the time that Sir Richard, was knighted during a tournament; but this is certainly erroneous, as there are grants of ecclesiastical lands patted to him by his names of Williams, alias Cromwell, as early as 1538: these authors are equally mistaken in supposing that the king never knew Sir Richard until the tournament, which cannot be; because those very grants patted some time before these martial games. With the name of Cromwell, Sir Richard assumed the arms of that family; but Sir Henry, his son, and his descendants, retook the proper arms of the Williams's, and never used any other (if the augmentation of the crest is excepted)".) He was educated at Queens' College, Cambridge.

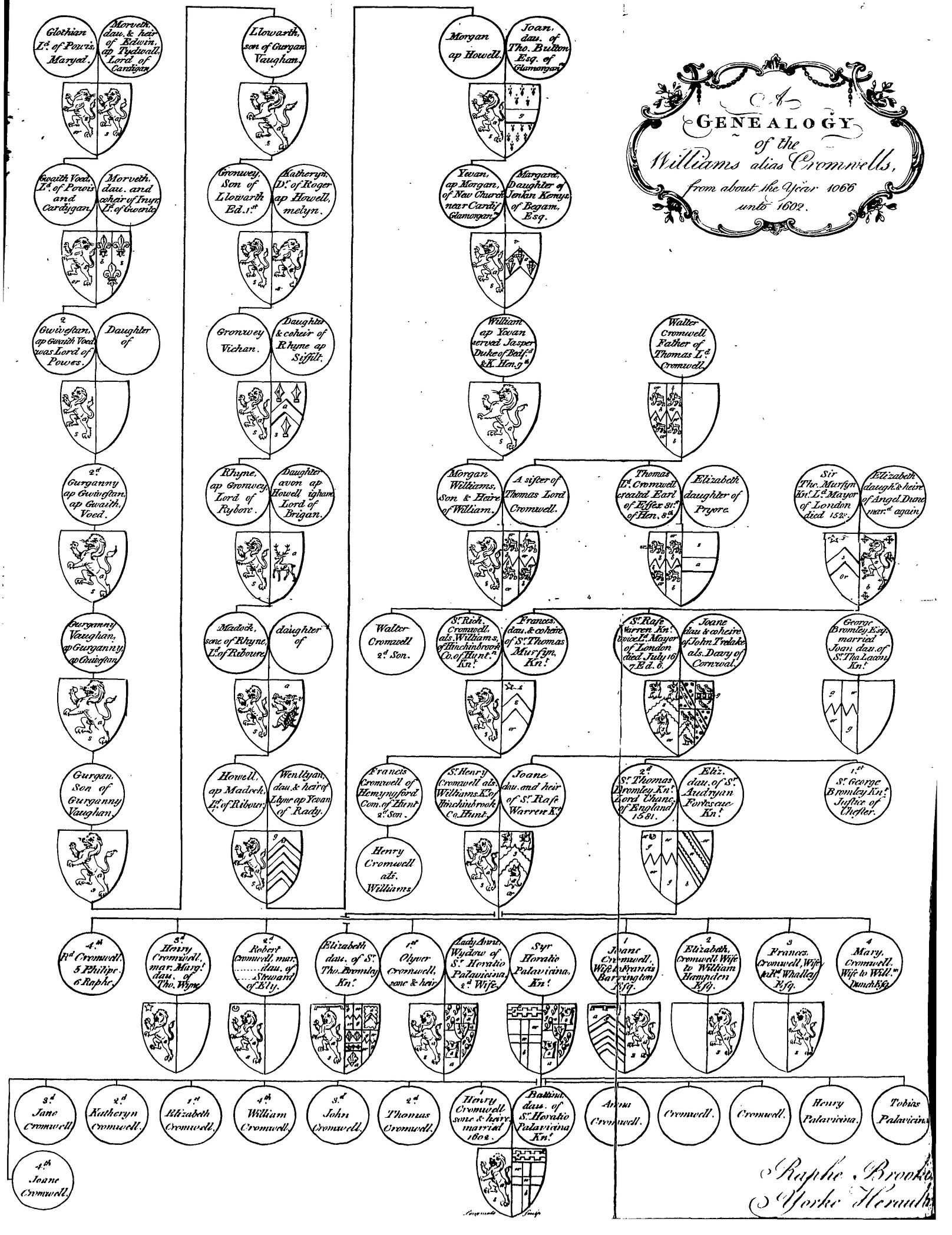
Genealogy of the Williams alias Cromwells, from about 1066 to 1602

== Career ==
He was highly esteemed by Queen Elizabeth I, who knighted him in 1564. He was an important enough man, with a large enough house, for the Queen to do him the honour of sleeping at his seat, Hinchingbrooke House, on 18 August 1564, on her return from visiting the University of Cambridge.

Williams, alias Cromwell, was in the House of Commons in 1563, as one of the knights of the shire for Huntingdonshire, and was four times appointed Sheriff of Cambridgeshire and Huntingdonshire, by Elizabeth, viz. in the 7, 13, 22, and 34 years of her reign; and in the 20th, she nominated him a commissioner with others, to inquire concerning the draining of The Fens through Cloughs Cross and so to the sea.

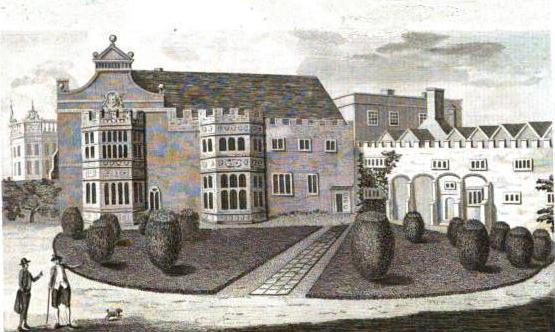
North front of Hinchinbrook (1787)

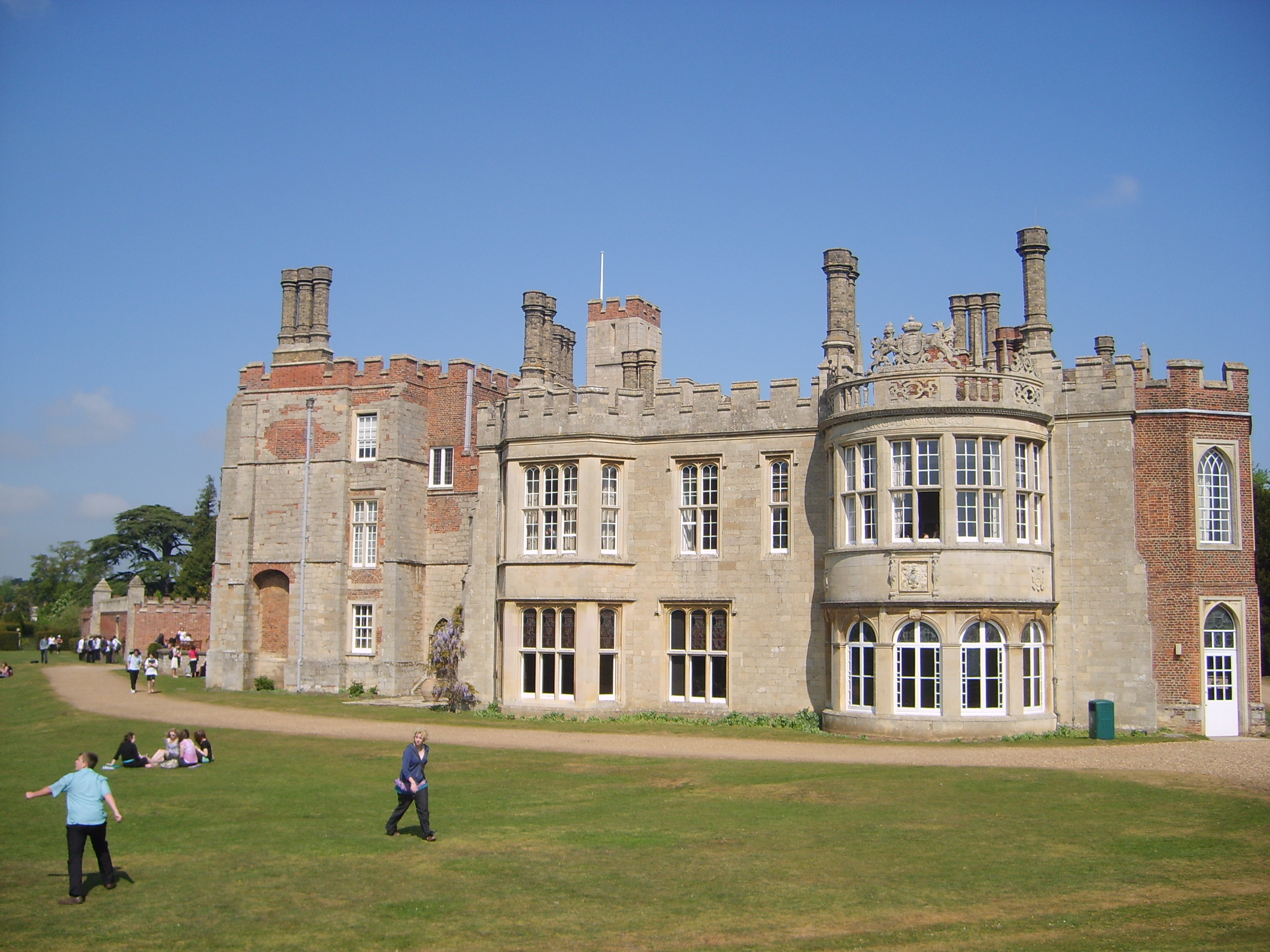
Hinchingbrooke House (2007)

He made Huntingdonshire the entire place of his country residence, living at Ramsey Abbey in the summer, and Hinchingbrooke in the winter; he repaired, if not built, the manor-house at Ramsey, and made it one of his seats. Mark Noble comments that he had heard that the house of Ramsey was only the lodge of that magnificent pile, and converted by Sir Henry into a dwelling-house. Sir Henry also built Hinchingbrooke House adjoining to the nunnery at Hinchingbrooke, and upon the bow windows there he put the arms of his family, with those of several others to whom he was allied.

Mark Noble stated that Sir Henry was called, from his liberality, the "golden knight"; and reported that in Ramsey it was said, that whenever Sir Henry came from Hinchingbrooke to that place, he threw considerable sums of money to the poor townsmen. This excellent character is given of him, "he was a worthy gentleman, both in court and country, and universally esteemed"; and which his merit justly deserved. By the record of inquisitio post mortem, taken at Ramsey, 2 June, following his death, it appears that he died possessed of these manors in Huntingdonshire, Saltry, Saltry-Moynes, Saltry-Judith, Sawtry-Monastery, all valued at £60 per annum; Warboys and Whistow, with their rectories, and the New-red-deer Park, valued together at £40 per annum; Hinchingbrooke, valued at £10 per annum; Broughton or Broweton, with the rectory, valued at £20 per annum; Berry and Hepmangrove, and the rectory of Berry, valued at £20 per annum; the forests of Waybridge, and Sapley, valued at £6 13s 4d; the farm or grange of Higney, and the messuage called the George, with the land belonging to it, valued at £10 per annum; and the manor of Ramsey, with the farm of Biggin, valued at £100 per annum. all of which were held of king by military service. except the forests of Waybridge and Sapley, together with the farm, or grange of Higney, the tenures of which were unknown.

== Marriage and issue ==
Sir Henry Williams, alias Cromwell, married twice. He married firstly, Joan (d. 1584), daughter of Sir Ralph Warren, twice Lord Mayor of London, by whom he had six sons and five daughters:

- Sir Oliver Cromwell.
- Robert Cromwell (c. 1567 - 1617), married Elizabeth Steward (c. 1560 - London, 1654), by whom he had two children:
  - Anne Cromwell, married John Sewster, and had Robina Sewster, wife of Sir William Lockhart, of Lee, Scotland, who held the office of Ambassador to France, and had Robina Lockhart (ca. 1662 - Bothwell Castle, Lanarkshire, 20 March 1740/41), married on 19 August 1679 at Lincoln's Inn Chapel, London, to Archibald Douglas, 1st Earl of Forfar (3 May 1653 – 11 December 1712, bur. Bothwell Church)
  - Oliver Cromwell (25 April 1599 – 3 September 1658), Lord Protector of England, Scotland and Ireland
- Henry Cromwell
- Richard Cromwell
- Philip Cromwell
- Ralph Cromwell
- Joan Cromwell (d. c. 1641, her will was probated on 14 December 1641), married Sir Francis Barrington, 1st Baronet (c. 1570 - 3 July 1628)
- Elizabeth Cromwell (c. 1562 – 1664), married William Hampden of Great Hampden, Buckinghamshire, son of Griffith Hampden and his second wife, Anne Cave. They had two sons, including:
  - John Hampden
- Frances Cromwell
- Mary Cromwell, married Sir William Dunch, of Little Wittenham, Berkshire (d. 22 January 1610/11), and had Edmund Dunch.
- Dorothy Cromwell, married Thomas Fleming (c. 1572–1624)

Lady Joan died at Hinchinbrooke and was buried there in All Saints' church in 1584.

He married secondly, Susan Weeks (d. 1592), by whom he had no issue, who bore for her arms azure a lion rampant checky argent and gules. She was buried at All Saints', Huntingdon, 11 July 1592 but no monument remains of either Sir Henry or of his wives, or indeed any of the name of Cromwell in that place as Huntingdon was devastated during the Civil War and all the monuments and brass plates to the dead were either destroyed or looted. Lady Susan died of a lingering illness, which in that superstitious age was blamed on witchcraft. On 4 April 1593, in the court presided over by justice Fenner, John Samwell, his wife, and daughter were found guilty of causing the death of Lady Susan through witchcraft, and executed a few days later (see the Witches of Warboys case).

== Death ==
Sir Henry lived to 66–67 years of age, dying 6 January 1604. He was buried in All Saints' Church, Huntingdon, on 7 January. An indication of the funeral pomp used at his interment can be found by the charges of the heralds, which were the same as those incurred at the burial of some of the greatest knights of his day. Sir Oliver, the eldest son, gained the bulk of his fortune, to each of the other sons were given estates of about an annual value of £300.

== Notes ==
Attribution
