= Ralph Warren (Lord Mayor) =

Sir Ralph Warren

Lord Mayor of London
- In office 1536–1536
- Preceded by: Sir John Alleyn
- Succeeded by: Sir Richard Gresham

Lord Mayor of London
- In office 1543–1543
- Preceded by: Sir William Bowyer
- Succeeded by: Sir William Laxton

Personal details
- Born: c. 1483
- Died: 11 July 1553
- Spouses: Christiana Warcup; Joan Trelake
- Occupation: Mercer

Sir Ralph Warren (c. 1483 – 11 July 1553) was twice Lord Mayor of London, for the first time in 1536 and the second in 1543.

== Biography ==
Ralph Warren was the son of Sir Thomas Warren of Feering, Essex, and grandson of William Warren.

Warren was a London mercer. He served as alderman, as Sheriff in 1528, and as Lord Mayor in 1536 and 1543. He was knighted in the first year of his mayoralty by Henry VIII.

He lived at Fulham House, a Grade II listed house at 87 Fulham High Street, Fulham.

In 1545 he gave a sword to the City of London, which could be the Pearl Sword that is now one of the five ceremonial City of London swords.

Warren died on 11 July 1553 at Bethnal Green, and was buried in the chancel of the church of St. Osythe's, (also known as St Benet Sherehog).

== Marriages and issue ==
Warren married firstly Christiana Warcup, widow of Roger North (d.1509), and daughter of Richard Warcup or Warcop of Sinnington, Yorkshire. By her marriage to Roger North, Christiana (née Warcup) had a son and daughter, Sir Edward North, and Joan North, who married, and was the Marian exile, Joan Wilkinson.

Warren married secondly, Joan Trelake, the daughter of John Trelake alias Davy, of Cornwall, by whom he had two children, Richard Warren (d.1598) and Joan Warren (d.1584), who married her father's ward, Sir Henry Williams of Hinchingbrooke House, Huntingdonshire, grandfather of the Protector Oliver Cromwell.

Joan married secondly, on 25 November 1558, Sir Thomas White, alderman of London, founder of St John's College, Oxford.

== See also ==
- List of Sheriffs of the City of London
- List of Lord Mayors of London
