= Eight Bells =

Eight Bells may refer to:

- Eights bells, a duty period on board ship, see ship's bell
- Eight Bells (album), a 2009 album by SubArachnoid Space
- Eight Bells (band), an American experimental metal band based in Portland, Oregon
- Eight Bells (film), a 1935 action adventure film directed by Roy William Neill
- Eight Bells (painting), an 1886 oil painting by Winslow Homer
- Eight Bells, Fulham, a pub in Fulham High Street, London, England
- The Eight Bells, Hatfield, a grade II listed public house in Park Street, Hatfield, Hertfordshire, England
- Eight Bells Hills, a topographic outlier of the Gilf Kebir plateau in the extreme southwestern corner of Egypt
