= Landless (album) =

Studio album by Eight Bells
- Released: 2016
- Genre: Avant-garde metal, post-metal, black metal, doom metal
- Label: Battleground Records
- Producer: Billy Anderson

Eight Bells chronology
The Captain's Daughter (2013)	Landless (2016)

Landless is the second album by Eight Bells, released on February 12, 2016, by Battleground Records.

== Track listing ==
No.	Title	Length
1.	"Hating"	6:48
2.	"Landless"	12:46
3.	"Hold My Breath"	8:06
4.	"The Mortal's Suite"	3:14
5.	"Touch Me"	8:45

== Personnel ==
- Melynda Marie Jackson
- Haley Elizabeth Westeiner
- Christopher Van Huffel
- Rae Amitay

== Reviews ==
Pitchfork contributor Jason Heller said "Wraithlike vocals and numbed melodies hanging over pinprick prog fretwork... The pulse of ethereal '70s rock – from Pink Floyd to Hawkwind's more celestial moments... Dual vocal lines emanate from some unseen place, sometimes braided together in a conjoined plea for connection... Heartbreakingly beautiful." Kim Kelly of Noisey music by Vice said "Landless is a tour-de-force... out-there progression, ethereal atmosphere, and unexpected harmonies." Natalie Zina Walschots of Exclaim writes "Eight Bells have created a veritable monument to yearning... Breathless, imbalanced genius." BrooklynVegan staffer Rob Sperry-Fromm says "There's a classical doom feel... wedded to a modern sense of progressiveness, with reverb-y harmonies and organ melding creating a vivid contrast with the driving, powerful drumming of new member Rae Amitay." According to the Invisible Oranges staff, "[Melynda] Jackson's chiming and piercing guitar tone evokes The Edge's celebratory playing style. She and [Haley] Westeiner employ two-part harmonies, the sort often used in medieval choir music... Their jagged, sometimes Slint-like approach to songwriting, and their assonant sining make their songs obscure... I find myself obsessed with the surface of Eight Bells' music, curious what lies beneath." MetalSucks Senior Editor Anso DF says "Another time and dimension... where Ulver and Ihsahn are Pink Floyd's precedents, where lyrics can trade mind-travels for centuries-ago suffering..." Walker MacMurdo at the Willamette Week writes, "Soaring, clean vocals punching through an aura of swirling melancholy... Landless sounds like a strong contender – Portland or otherwise – for the best metal album of the usually slow first quarter of 2016." According to loudwire.com, Landless is "An exercise in sonic dreamscapes... Unpredictable from moment to moment, Landless is an exciting listen." Allen Griffin at Burning Ambulance says "Like any great trio, each instrument is equally important to the overall architecture of the sound... Eight Bells is much more than the sum of their parts. Eight Bells have crafted a unique sound, one that is thematically consistent, from lyrics to artwork and sonic palette as well." According to Echoes and Dust writer Peter Meinertzhagen, "Landless drifts like an ethereal mist, enveloping you slowly... Eight Bells shrug off the meandering bluesy psychedelia of their debut in favor of a sound that is darker, more mature, and more atmospheric, sounding less like a jam and more like a crafted narrative." Manny-O-War at Nine Circles says "It takes special talent and songwriting to grab the listener with what's not there; to entice the listener with merely the mood or emotion of your music. Eight Bells are experts here... The perfect combination of Brian Eno, Ulver and King Crimson." Brian Krasman of Meat Mead Metal writes "From the progressive sections, to the enthralling arrangements, to the lush vocal harmonies that push the story, to the propulsive drumming, this group create weaving, winding tapestries that are melodic, dark, hypnotic... This is an adventure."
