= Also Rising =

Studio album by SubArachnoid Space
- Released: April 8, 2003
- Genre: Space rock, psychedelic rock
- Length: 60:45
- Label: Strange Attractors Audio House

SubArachnoid Space chronology
A New and Exact Map (2000)	Also Rising (2003)	The Red Veil (2005)

Professional ratings
Review scores
Source	Rating
Allmusic	2.5/5 stars
Pitchfork Media	(5.9/10)

Also Rising is the fourth studio album by SubArachnoid Space, released on April 8, 2003 by Strange Attractors Audio House.

== Track listing ==
All music is composed by SubArachnoid Space.

No.	Title	Length
1.	"The Harsh Facts of Life"	10:06
2.	"Deep End"	6:32
3.	"[untitled]"	2:56
4.	"Angel Food"	3:58
5.	"Burn Shot"	4:29
6.	"Tucson"	5:25
7.	"Dateland"	3:36
8.	"Down Nod Out"	6:38
9.	"Tigris"	10:50
10.	"[untitled]"	6:15

== Personnel ==
Adapted from the Also Rising liner notes.

SubArachnoid Space

- Chris Van Huffel – drums, percussion
- Melynda Jackson – guitar, organ (1)
- Mason Jones – guitar
- Stoo Odom – bass guitar
- Andey Koa Stephens - bass guitar on “Tigris”

Production and additional personnel

- Myles Boisen – mastering
- Joe Goldring – engineering, mixing, Hammond organ (2)
- Loren Rhoads – photography
- Desmond Shea – mixing (5)

== Release history ==
Region	Date	Label	Format	Catalog
United States	2003	Strange Attractors Audio House	CD	SAAH013
