= The Red Veil =

Studio album by SubArachnoid Space
- Released: February 15, 2005
- Recorded: April 2004
- Genre: Space rock, psychedelic rock
- Length: 40:15
- Label: Strange Attractors Audio House
- Producer: Mason Jones, Donny Newenhouse, SubArachnoid Space

SubArachnoid Space chronology
Also Rising (2003)	The Red Veil (2005)	Eight Bells (2009)

Professional ratings
Review scores
Source	Rating
Allmusic	3.5/5 stars

The Red Veil is the fifth studio album by SubArachnoid Space, released on February 15, 2005 by Strange Attractors Audio House.

== Track listing ==
All music is composed by SubArachnoid Space.

No.	Title	Length
1.	"Honorable Mention"	4:12
2.	"Ourobouros"	6:14
3.	"The Red Veil"	11:08
4.	"Trainable"	3:53
5.	"P.S.S.A."	8:20
6.	"Duster"	6:28

== Personnel ==
Adapted from The Red Veil liner notes.

SubArachnoid Space

- Chris Cones – guitar, electronics
- Diego Gonzalez – bass guitar
- Chris Van Huffel – drums
- Melynda Jackson – guitar

Production and additional personnel

- John Golden – mastering
- Mason Jones – production
- Donny Newenhouse – production
- Joshua Pfeffer – photography, design
- Lorraine Rath – cover art, illustrations
- SubArachnoid Space – production

== Release history ==
Region	Date	Label	Format	Catalog
United States	2005	Strange Attractors Audio House	CD	SAAH025
