= These Things Take Time (SubArachnoid Space album) =

Live album by SubArachnoid Space
- Released: September 19, 2000
- Recorded: December 11, 1999 on KFJC 89.7FM
- Genre: Space rock, psychedelic rock
- Length: 44:54
- Label: Release Entertainment

SubArachnoid Space chronology
The Sleeping Sickness (1999)	These Things Take Time (2000)	A New and Exact Map (2000)

Professional ratings
Review scores
Source	Rating
Alternative Press	4/5 stars

These Things Take Time is a live performance album by SubArachnoid Space, released on September 19, 2000, by Release Entertainment.

== Track listing ==
All music is composed by SubArachnoid Space.

No.	Title	Length
1.	"A"	9:16
2.	"B"	6:51
3.	"C"	3:05
4.	"D"	10:57
5.	"E"	9:03
6.	"F"	2:08
7.	"G"	3:34

== Personnel ==
Adapted from the These Things Take Time liner notes.

SubArachnoid Space

- Chris Van Huffel – drums, percussion
- Melynda Jackson – guitar
- Mason Jones – guitar, theremin
- Andey Koa Stephens – bass guitar, organ

Production and additional personnel

- Grawer – engineering
- Jai-Young Kim – mastering
- Loren Rhoads – photography

== Release history ==
Region	Date	Label	Format	Catalog
United States	2000	Release Entertainment	CD	RR 6473
