= Gobelin =

Historic family of dyers in France

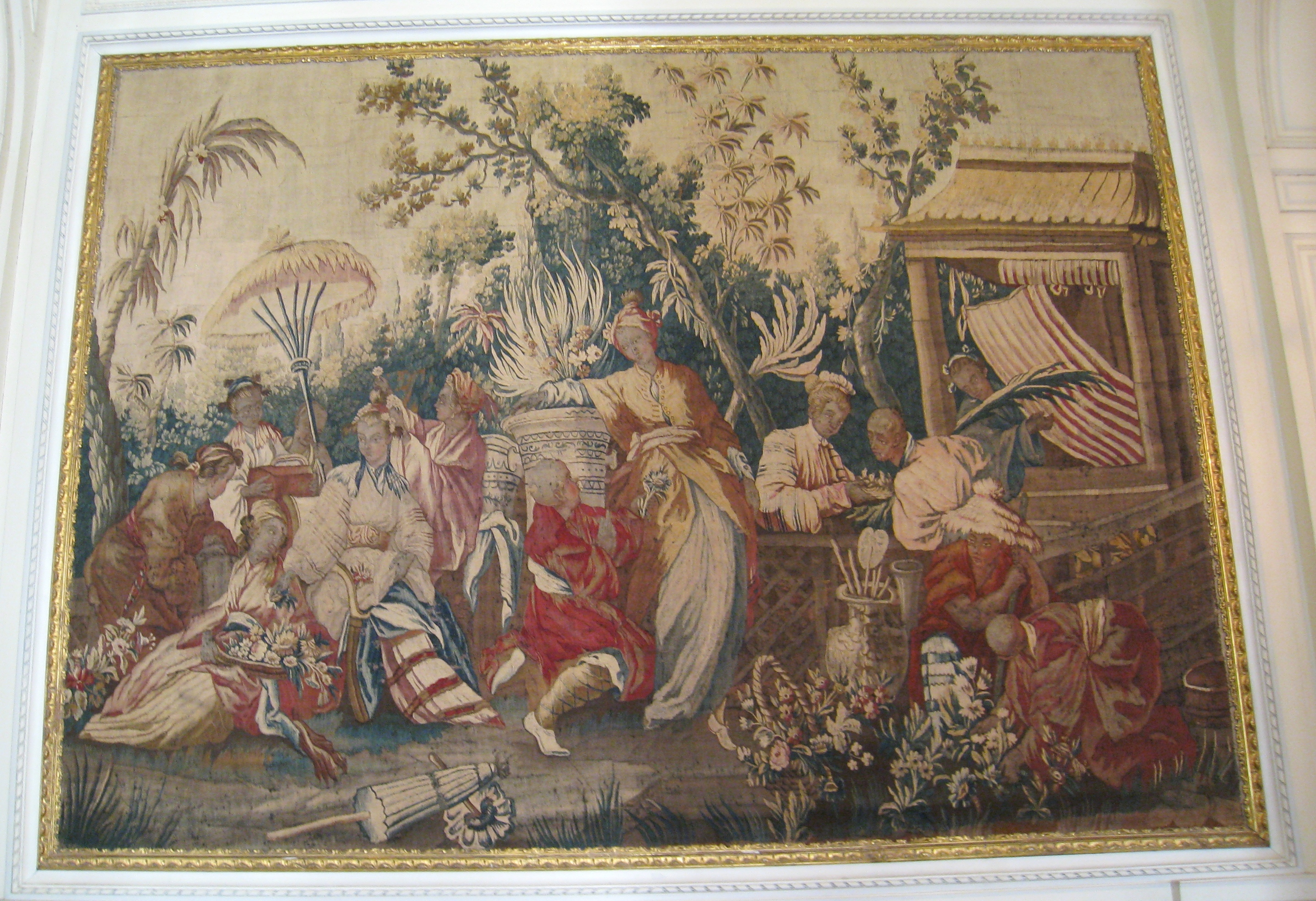
Gobelins tapestry circa 1680, in the Musée Nissim de Camondo, Paris

Gobelin was the name of a family of dyers, who in all probability came originally from Reims, France, and who in the middle of the 15th century established themselves in the Faubourg Saint Marcel, Paris, on the banks of the Bièvre.

The first head of the firm was named Jehan Gobelin (d. 1476). He discovered a peculiar kind of scarlet dyestuff, and he expended so much money on his establishment that it was named by the common people la folie Gobelin. To the dye-works there was added in the 16th century a manufactory of tapestry.

The family's wealth increased so rapidly that in the third or fourth generation some of them forsook their trade and purchased titles of nobility. More than one of their number held offices of state, among others Balthasar, who became successively treasurer general of artillery, treasurer extraordinary of war, councillor secretary of the king, chancellor of the exchequer, councillor of state and president of the chamber of accounts, and who in 1601 received from Henry IV the lands and lordship of Brie-Comte-Robert. He died in 1603. The name of the Gobelins as dyers cannot be found later than the end of the 17th century.

In 1662, the works in the Faubourg Saint Marcel, with the adjoining grounds, were purchased by Jean-Baptiste Colbert on behalf of Louis XIV and transformed into a general upholstery manufactory, the Gobelins Manufactory.

In various languages 'gobelin' is synonymous with 'tapestry'.

== See also ==
- Gobelins Manufactory
