= Golden Lion, Fulham =

Pub in Fulham, London

Coordinates: 51°28′12″N 0°12′37″W

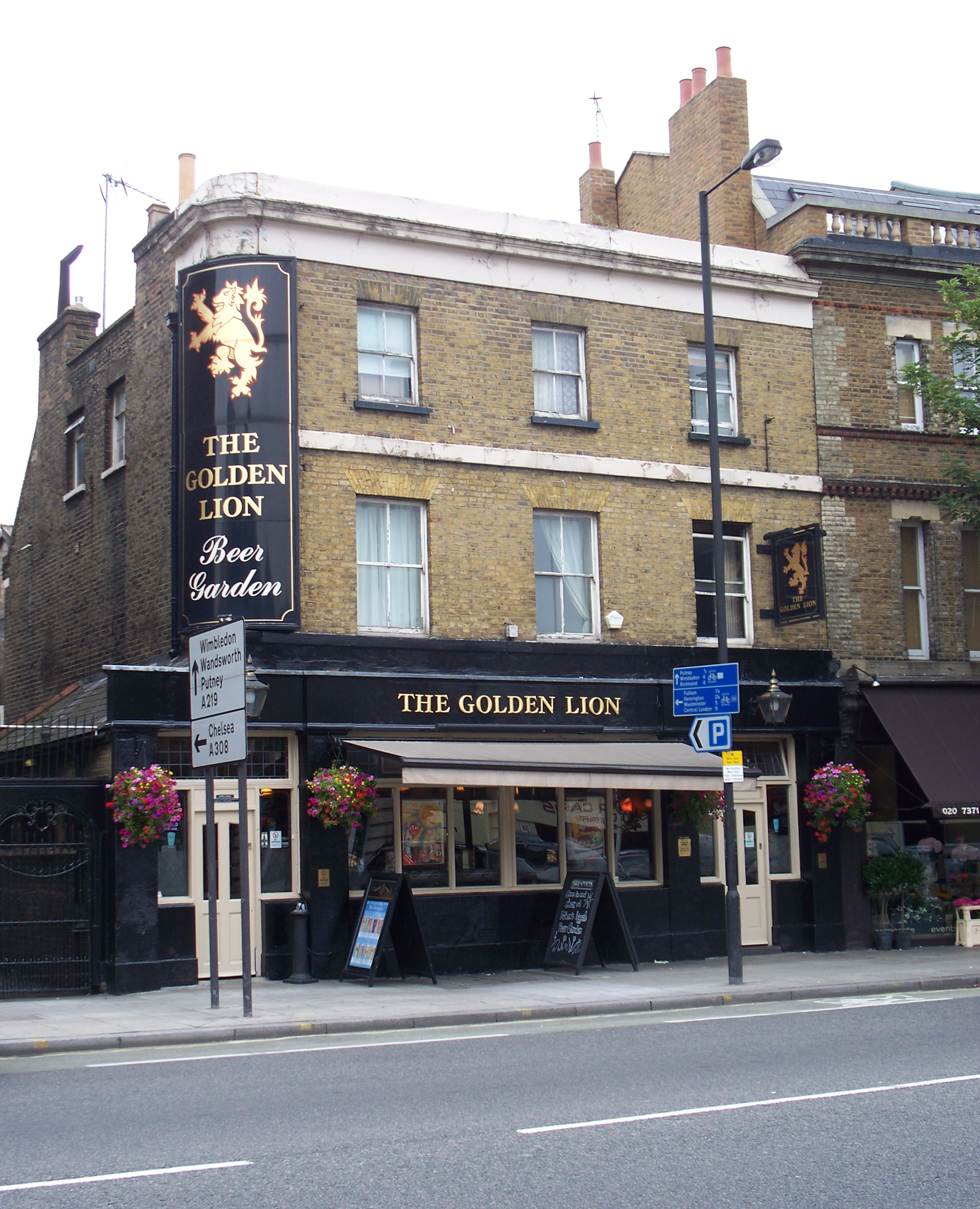
The Golden Lion, 57 High Street, Fulham, London SW6 3JJ

The Golden Lion is a pub in Fulham, in the London Borough of Hammersmith and Fulham, London, England. It is located on Fulham High Street, to the east of Fulham Palace Gardens. Built in 1455 it is reported as the oldest pub in Fulham and was rebuilt by one of its Victorian owners. Notable patrons include the playwrights Shakespeare (in the 16th century) and Fletcher as well as Bishop Bonner.

== History ==
Faulkner, in his History of Fulham, supposes the original mansion to have been of the time of Henry VII; and that it was the residence of Bishop Bonner. James Dugham states that it was undoubtedly a "princely residence". After its conversion into an inn, it was frequented by William Shakespeare and John Fletcher. The original Golden Lion was pulled down in April 1836. The house which was subsequently rebuilt in April 1836 carried inscriptions on its two chimneys; a picture of the towers appeared in the Gentlemen's Magazine in June 1838. Subsequent to its demolition, John Powell Powell sold it to Street. It was also the repository of the "arms and accouterments" of the old Fulham Volunteers. The Bachelors Club also held its meetings at the Golden Lion. After Powell, the inn was owned by Mrs Ann Sophia Blake and then by Colonel Edward Harwood. A private road from the Golden Lion led to the Burlington Road. Before its demolition, in 1820 it was cited as the oldest house in Fulham.

In the 1970s The Golden Lion pub became known as a rock music venue and a meeting place for the British rock band Led Zeppelin other rock musicians and their peers, who attended recording sessions at ELPs' nearby Manticore studios. It ceased music listings in the mid-1980s when the managing pub group was re-organised.

== Architecture ==
=== Original building ===
The Old Golden Lion Public House featured architecture of the Tudor era. The irregular form of the building was constructed of brick to the first storey, and timber work and plaster above. The roof was highly ridged and tiled. An entrance from the street opened into a small passage or hall, having the stairs immediately facing the entrance door. The massive balusters and huge posts surmounted by lofty pinnacles, and the dim light from the small latticed window, gave a dark appearance to this part of the building. In a room north of the hall at the north-east corner, the remains of a small winding staircase of brick and stone, which led originally to the upper part of the mansion was found on taking down the wainscot. The wainscoting was taken to Southam House, Lord Ellenborough's seat, near Cheltenham.

The general character of the original structure was distinguished by long windows divided into numerous lights by massive mullions and transoms. An apartment on the principal storey contained a pointed arched fireplace, enriched panelling of oak, and a bay window, together with its size, being larger than the other apartments, would prove this to have been the grand room of the house. Heavy beams of chestnut crossed the ceiling, supported by a slender pillar at the intersection. Some apartments, south of this principal room, had been disused for many years, the windows being partly blocked up. The low pointed arched doorway was about two feet six inches in width.

A room on the east side was wainscoted and panelled in a plain style; a long window extended the whole length of the east end of the apartment, and a thick beam crossed the ceiling, supported at each end by rude pieces of timber. The fireplace was highly enriched by caryatid figures, and carved work of oak-foliage in low relief ornamented the stone mantle. The fireplace in the apartment immediately under this on the basement floor was ornamented. The upper rooms were lofty and airy, the space usually divided off into lofts being open to the roof—showing the heavy beams and girders in all their rude simplicity, the windows small and near the roof, the doorways narrow and low, and formed roughly of unplaited boards—opening by a wooden latch and spring.

In the apartment on the south side of the hall was a trap door, which opened onto a short flight of winding stairs leading into a vaulted cellar, built of brick with courses of stone, having a recess on the north side. An arched doorway of stone faced a flight of stone steps leading to the back part of the building. This vault was used for many years, and was commonly known as " Bishop Bonner's Dungeon." The east view of the mansion presented a more irregular front than the west.
