= Ether Or =

Live album by SubArachnoid Space
- Released: April 1997
- Recorded: October 2 – October 6, 1996
- Genre: Space rock, psychedelic rock
- Length: 54:36
- Label: Unit Circle

SubArachnoid Space chronology
Delicate Membrane (1996)	Ether Or (1997)	Almost Invisible (1997)

Ether Or is a live performance album by SubArachnoid Space, released in April 1997 by Unit Circle Rekkids.

== Track listing ==
All music is composed by SubArachnoid Space.

No.	Title	Length
1.	"Circular Motion"	10:16
2.	"Whispers of Momentum"	10:11
3.	"Flicker"	4:13
4.	"Shady Character"	7:32
5.	"Repetitive Smile"	6:20
6.	"A Collection of Smoke"	14:04
7.	"Don't Look in the Mirror"	2:00

== Personnel ==
Adapted from the Ether Or liner notes.

SubArachnoid Space

- Melynda Jackson – guitar
- Mason Jones – guitar, bass guitar
- Michelle Schreiber – drums

Additional musicians

- Chris Van Huffel – percussion (2)
- Michelle Marcoccia – didgeridoo (1, 7)

== Release history ==
Region	Date	Label	Format	Catalog
United States	1997	Unit Circle	CD	tUC041
