= The Captain's Daughter (album) =

Studio album by Eight Bells
- Released: 2013
- Genre: Experimental rock, hard rock, Heavy metal
- Length: 31:10
- Label: Seventh Rule Recordings
- Producer: Billy Anderson

Eight Bells chronology
The Captain's Daughter (2013)	Landless (2016)

The Captain's Daughter is the debut album by Eight Bells that was released 19 February 2013 by Seventh Rule Recordings. The album was engineered by Billy Anderson The band toured in April 2013 to promote the album.

== Track listing ==
No.	Title	Length
1.	"Tributaries"	3:50
2.	"Fate and Technology"	7:20
3.	"The Captain's Daughter"	12:48
4.	"Yellowed Wallpaper"	7:10

== Critical reception ==
The album received generally positive reviews with many critics praising the music complexity, variety and the seamless blend of genres. Some critics were even more glowing with their reviews labeling it "head-bang inducing, ethereal and gloriously unpredictable" and "as close to perfect as you can get. Absolutely stellar." The dark and haunting atmospheric created by the album and the "spartan" lyrics were similarly praised by numerous critics.
