= Delicate Membrane =

Studio album by SubArachnoid Space
- Released: September 9, 1996
- Recorded: 1996 in San Francisco, CA
- Genre: Space rock, psychedelic rock
- Length: 69:17
- Label: Charnel Music

SubArachnoid Space chronology
Delicate Membrane (1996)	Ether Or (1997)

Professional ratings
Review scores
Source	Rating
Alternative Press	4/5 stars

Delicate Membrane is the debut studio album of SubArachnoid Space, released on September 9, 1996, by Charnel Music.

== Track listing ==
All music is composed by SubArachnoid Space.

No.	Title	Length
1.	"Karoshi"	8:30
2.	"Don't Look in the Trunk"	6:03
3.	"Talking Tina & Her Mechanical Frog"	10:01
4.	"Slow Boat to China"	8:36
5.	"K&V Equals Drool"	7:22
6.	"Doomed Megalopolis"	2:51
7.	"Highly Unnatural"	7:39
8.	"Something Wicked"	4:53
9.	"Lidocaine"	13:22

== Personnel ==
Adapted from the Delicate Membrane liner notes.

SubArachnoid Space

- Melynda Jackson – guitar
- Mason Jones – guitar, bass guitar
- Michelle Schreiber – percussion

Production and additional personnel

- Myles Boisen – mastering
- SubArachnoid Space – cover art

== Release history ==
Region	Date	Label	Format	Catalog
United States	1996	Charnel	CD	CHCD-22
