= SubArachnoid Space =

- Origin: San Francisco, California, United States
- Genres: Space rock, Psychedelic rock
- Years active: 1996–2010
- Labels: Charnel; Release; Strange Attractors; Crucial Blast
- Members: Melynda Jackson; Chris Van Huffel; Daniel Barone; Erik Moggridge
- Past members: Mason Jones; Jason Stein; Andey Koa Stephens; Chris Cones; Diego Gonzalez; Stooert Odom; Michael Shiono; Russ Archer
- Website: subarachnoid.com

SubArachnoid Space was a San Francisco, California-based psychedelic rock band founded in 1996 by Mason Jones, the owner of the independent music label Charnel Music. Initially the band was a trio (Mason Jones: guitar, Jason Stein: bass, Michelle Schreiber: drums) and the debut 7" single release was by the trio. Before the band's first live show, performed at KFJC radio, second guitarist Melynda Jackson joined. The quartet toured for several years until Michelle moved to Texas and Jason left to pursue other interests. Chris Van Huffle then joined as the drummer, and Andy Koa Stephens took over on bass. After Stephens left in 2002 to work with David Starfire, the bassist role changed several times, but the rest of the lineup remained stable until 2003, when Mason departed to allow the band to tour more extensively. Shortly after, the band's core members, Melvyn and Chris, relocated to Portland, Oregon, where they continued to perform, tour, and release albums. The band completed a fall tour of the US with the Italian group OVO in September/October 2009 before disbanding on August 13, 2010. This was accompanied by a farewell show at Mississippi studios. Melynda Jackson and Chris Van Huffle went on to form Eight Bells.

== Selected discography ==
=== Studio albums ===
- Delicate Membrane (1996), Charnel Music
- Endless Renovation (1998), Release Records
- A New and Exact Map (2000), September Gurls
- Also Rising (2003), Strange Attractors
- The Red Veil (2005), Strange Attractors
- Eight Bells (2009), Crucial Blast

=== Singles ===
"Char-Broiled Wonderland" 7-inch single (1996), Charnel Music

=== Split LPs ===
- Tigris / Euphrates split LP with Bardo Pond (2002), Camera Obscura

=== Collaborative Albums ===
- The Sleeping Sickness (1999), Elsie & Jack

=== Live Albums ===
- Ether Or (1997), Unit Circle Records
- Almost Invisible (1997), Release Records
- Endless Renovation (1998), Release Records
- These Things Take Time (2000), Release Records

== Former members ==
- Melynda Jackson – guitar
- Chris Van Huffel – drums
- Daniel Barone – bass
- Erik Moggridge – guitar
- Mason Jones – guitar
- Jason Stein - bass guitar
- Andey Koa Stephens– bass guitar
- Chris Cones – guitar
- Diego Gonzalez – bass guitar
- Stooert Odom – bass guitar
- Michael Shiono - bass
- Rus Archer - guitar
- Daniel Osborne - guitar
- Lauren K. Newman - drums
- Bryan Sours - drums
