= Endless Renovation =

Studio album by SubArachnoid Space
- Released: June 23, 1998
- Recorded: Various: Guerilla Euphonics; (Oakland, CA); Subspace; (Los Angeles, CA)
- Genre: Space rock, psychedelic rock
- Length: 67:46
- Label: Release Entertainment

SubArachnoid Space chronology
Almost Invisible (1997)	Endless Renovation (1998)	The Sleeping Sickness (1999)

Professional ratings
Review scores
Source	Rating
Allmusic	4/5 stars

Endless Renovation is the second studio album by SubArachnoid Space, released on June 23, 1998, by Release Entertainment.

== Track listing ==
All music is composed by SubArachnoid Space.

No.	Title	Length
1.	"Will You Make My House a Carnival?"	11:36
2.	"Square Wheels"	9:13
3.	"Good Grief?"	8:50
4.	"Stereo Saturation"	7:01
5.	"Safety in Numbers"	17:51
6.	"Twilight Sleep"	13:15

== Personnel ==
Adapted from the Endless Renovation liner notes.

SubArachnoid Space

- Chris Van Huffel – drums
- Melynda Jackson – guitar, tape, vocals
- Mason Jones – guitar

Additional musicians

- Arusha Baker – hammered dulcimer (5)
- John Trevor Bensonon – double bass (5)
- A.L. Dentel – cello (5, 6)
- Kris Force – violin (5)

Additional musicians (cont.)

- Anthony Petrovic – synthesizer (6)
- Jason Stein – bass guitar (1, 5, 6)
- Andey Koa Stephens – organ and bass guitar (1–4)

Production and additional personnel

- Myles Boisen – recording
- Matthew F. Jacobson – executive producer
- Kime Joan – photography
- Jeff Mann – mastering
- Bill Yurkiewicz – executive producer

== Release history ==
Region	Date	Label	Format	Catalog
United States	1998	Release Entertainment	CD	RR 6402
