= The King's Head, Fulham =

Pub in Fulham, London

Coordinates: 51.4715°N 0.2115°W

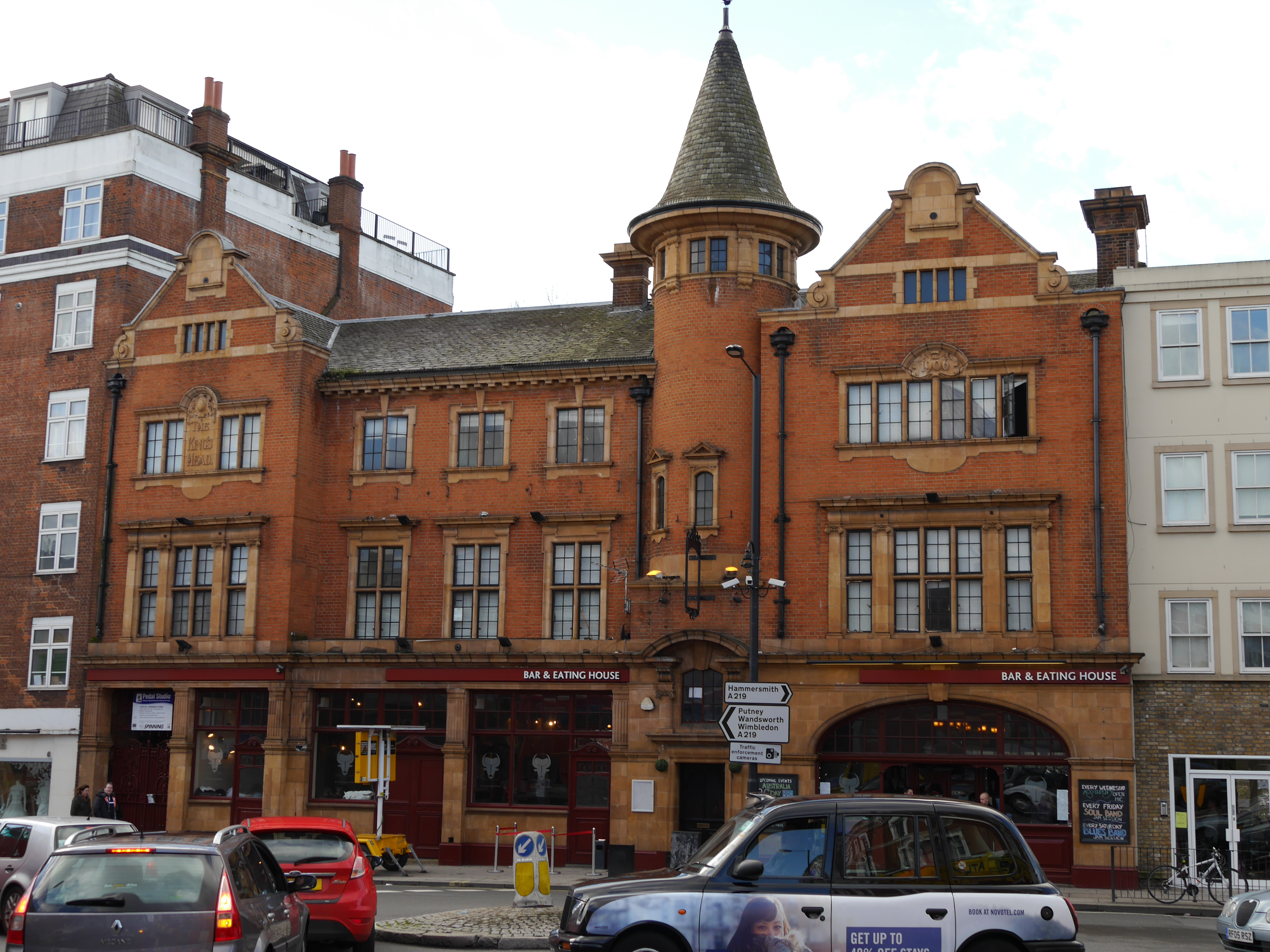
The King's Head, 2014

The King's Head is a Grade II listed public house at 4 Fulham High Street, Fulham, London.

It was built in 1906 in the Scottish Baronial style.

The Post Office Directory listed it as owned by Criswick & Feaviour in 1919 and Feaviour & Co Ltd in 1938. The original address was 12 Fulham High St, but this was renumbered as No 4 by 1938.

Since March 2012 till 2013, it was trading as Low Country an American style "bar & eating house". In recent years it has catered to a South African clientele as both Joe Cool's and Zulu's, and then traded as The Ramshackle. Previously, as The King's Head it was a popular live music venue.

The venue is now known as The Courtyard since August 2017 (previously The King's Head & Courtyard) - and was voted 'The Best Place To Drink In The Sun In London' in the 2018 Time Out Love London Awards. The bar followed on to win 6 other Time Out Awards and 1 Design My Night 2018 Award. The cocktail bar is known for changing over their garden every 6 months and their indoor cocktail lounge that changes into a popular night club environment in the evenings.
