= Fulham High Street =

Street in Fulham, London

Coordinates: 51.4706°N 0.2107°W

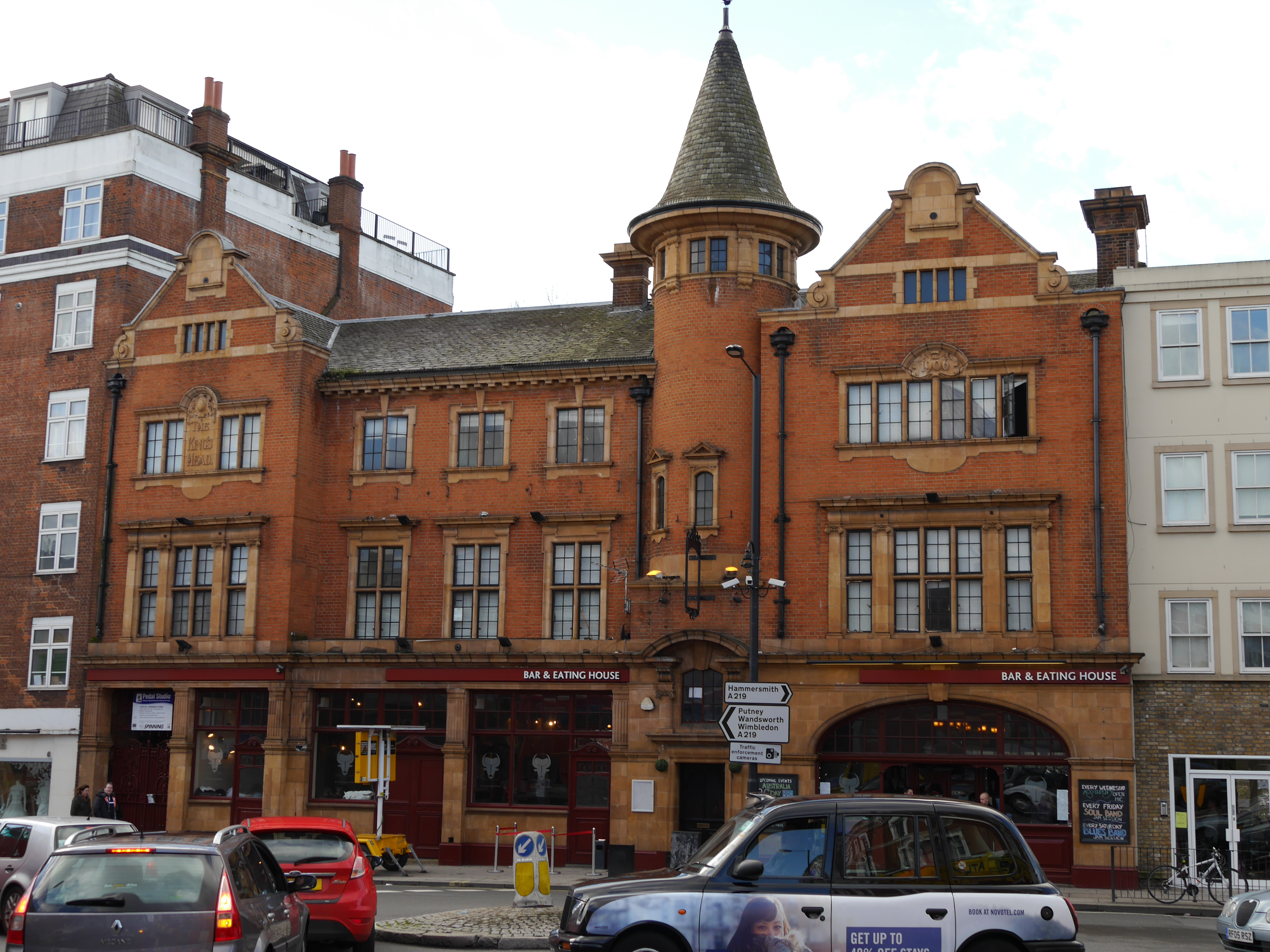
The King's Head, 2014

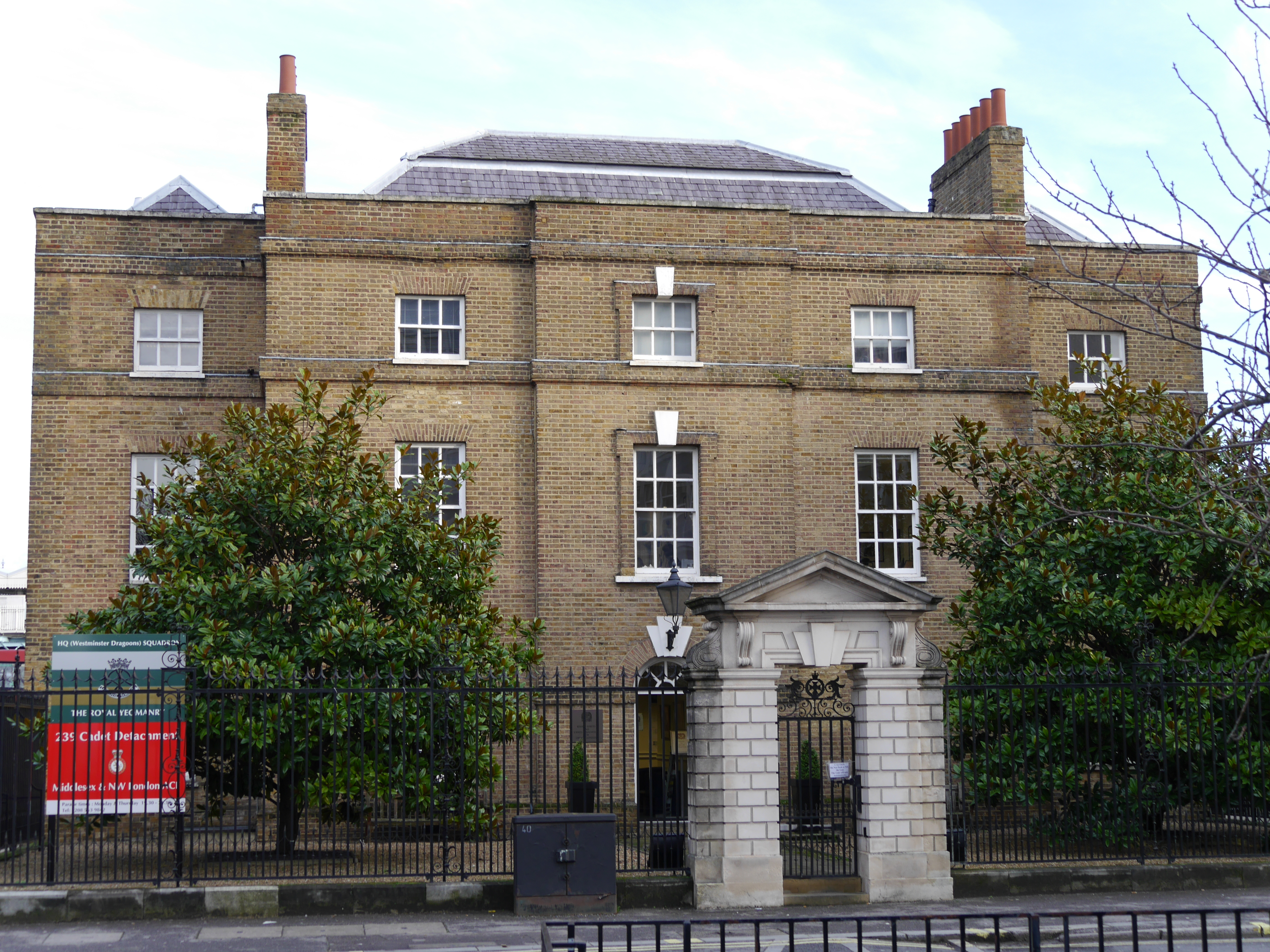
Fulham House, 2014

Fulham High Street is a street in Fulham, London.

It runs north–south, from the junction with the western end of Fulham Road in the north, where it continues to Hammersmith as Fulham Palace Road, past the junction with the western end of New King's Road, and ends in the south where it would have continued to cross the River Thames via Fulham Bridge from 1729 to 1886. In 1886, a new stone bridge (known as Putney Bridge) was built, with its northern footings somewhat to the west of the existing bridge. The old wooden bridge was demolished and the road now ends at the water's edge. The section between Fulham Road and New King's Road is part of the A219.

The London historian, Barbara Denny, writes about Nos.49-55 having been the site of a tapestry manufactory in the mid 18th-century, run by the priest adventurer, Pierre Parisot. The reasons for bringing his factory to Fulham were twofold: the French Gobelins Manufactory was already established in Fulham and he wished to introduce a 'youth training scheme' for young draughtsmen, dyers and weavers. The site subsequently became a school.

In his 1860 work, A walk from London to Fulham, Thomas Crofton Croker notes that Fulham High Street ran from London Road in the north to Church Row in the south, and was originally called Bear Street and sometimes Fulham Street. Croker notes that even in his day, several fine mansions had been demolished.

There are several pubs, including the Golden Lion, the King's Head, the Eight Bells, and the Temperance, the latter having originally been a Temperance Billiard Hall.

Other notable buildings include the Grade II listed Fulham House, dates to the reign of Edward III, and past inhabitants include Ralph Warren, the Lord Mayor of London in 1536, and the cloth merchant Sir Thomas White.
