= A New and Exact Map =

Studio album by SubArachnoid Space
- Released: October 15, 2000
- Recorded: 1998 and 1999 at Subspace, Los Angeles, California
- Genre: Space rock, psychedelic rock
- Length: 49:23
- Label: September Gurls

SubArachnoid Space chronology
These Things Take Time (2000)	A New and Exact Map (2000)	Also Rising (2003)

A New and Exact Map is the fourth album by SubArachnoid Space, released on October 15, 2000, through September Gurls.

== Track listing ==
All music is composed by SubArachnoid Space.

No.	Title	Length
1.	"Prism"	4:17
2.	"Drink Me"	4:25
3.	"Indy Maru"	14:51
4.	"Fruity Drinks With Little Umbrellas"	7:14
5.	"Melted"	18:37

== Personnel ==
SubArachnoid Space

- Chris Van Huffel – drums, percussion, synthesizer, sampler, slide guitar
- Melynda Jackson – guitar, synthesizer, percussion
- Mason Jones – guitar, synthesizer, percussion
- Andey Koa Stephens – bass guitar, organ, synthesizer

Production and additional personnel

- Doug Ferguson – organ on "Indy Maru"
- Kime Joan – photography
- SubArachnoid Space – design
