= The Sleeping Sickness =

1999 studio album by SubArachnoid Space and Walking Timebombs

Studio album and Live album by SubArachnoid Space and Walking Timebombs
- Released: December 7, 1999
- Recorded: October 1, 1996
- Genre: Psychedelic rock, experimental rock
- Length: 67:56
- Label: Elsie & Jack

SubArachnoid Space chronology
Endless Renovation (1998)	The Sleeping Sickness (1999)	These Things Take Time (2000)

Walking Timebombs chronology
Static Migration (1998)	The Sleeping Sickness (1999)	Sapsucker (2001)

Professional ratings
Review scores
Source	Rating
Allmusic	4/5 stars
Alternative Press	3/5 stars

The Sleeping Sickness is a collaborative album by SubArachnoid Space and Walking Timebombs, released on December 7, 1999 BYElsie & Jack Recordings.

== Track listing ==
All music is composed by SubArachnoid Space and Walking Timebombs.

No.	Title	Length
1.	"Introduction" (live)	1:17
2.	"The Sleeping Sickness I"	8:52
3.	"The Sickness Sleeps"	4:08
4.	"Sick and Sleeping" (live)	9:43
5.	"No Sleep for the Sick" (live)	3:30
6.	"The Sleepless Sickness"	8:50
7.	"The Sleepless Sickness II"	8:57
8.	"[untitled]"	22:39

== Personnel ==
Adapted from The Sleeping Sickness liner notes.

Musicians

- Scott Ayers – guitar, engineering, mixing, recording
- Melynda Jackson – guitar
- Mason Jones – guitar
- Michelle Schreiber – drums
- Jason Stein – bass guitar

Production and additional personnel

- James Rodriguez – mastering
- Phil Rodriguez – photography

== Release history ==
Region	Date	Label	Format	Catalog
United States	1999	Elsie & Jack	CD	#:004
