= Gobelins Manufactory =

Historic tapestry factory in Paris, France

Coordinates: 48.834656°N 2.352055°E

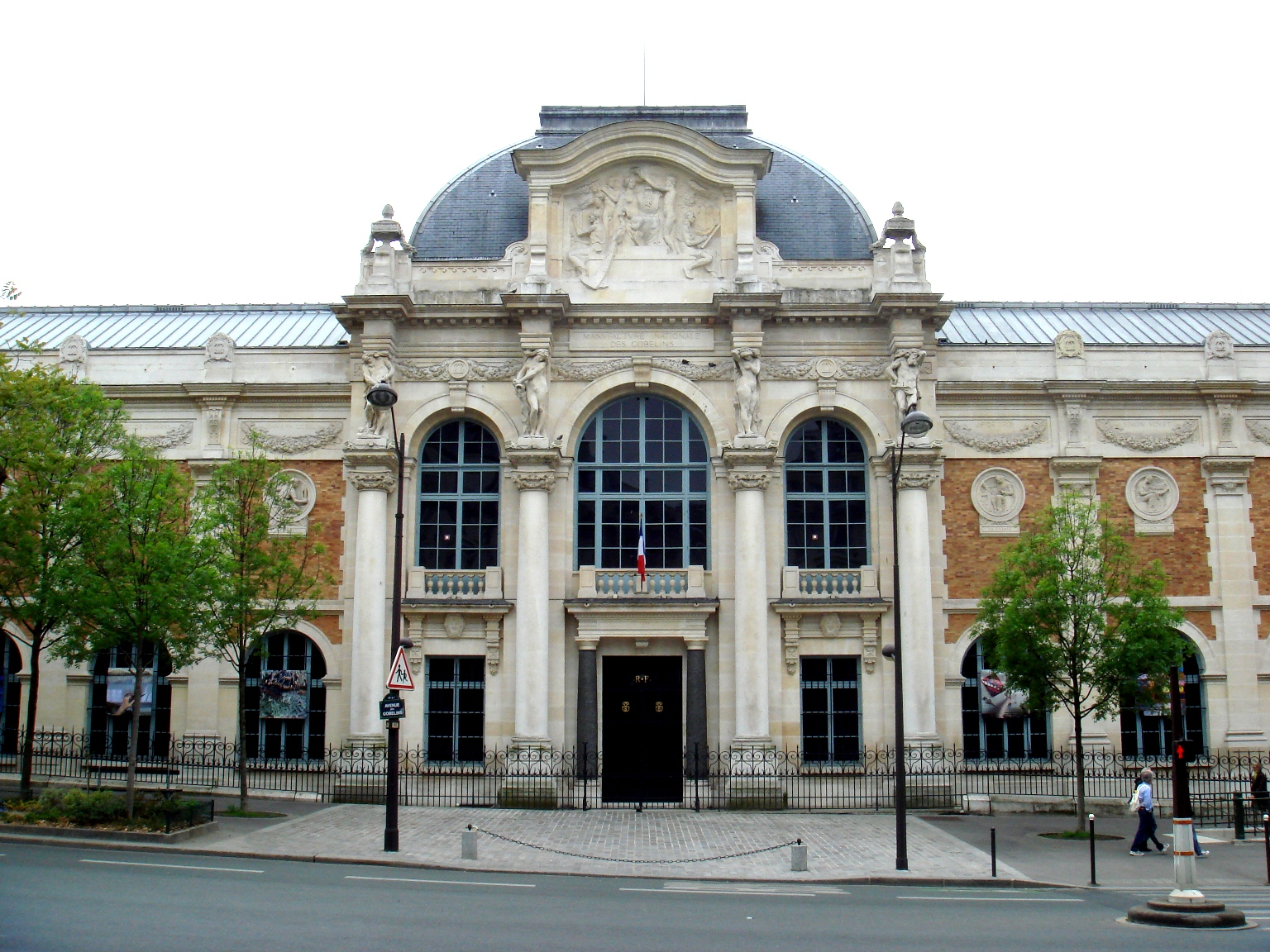
The Gobelins Manufactory in 2009

The Gobelins Manufactory (French: Manufacture des Gobelins) is a historic tapestry factory in Paris, France. It is located at 42 avenue des Gobelins, near Les Gobelins métro station in the 13th arrondissement of Paris. It was originally established on the site as a medieval dyeing business by the family Gobelin.

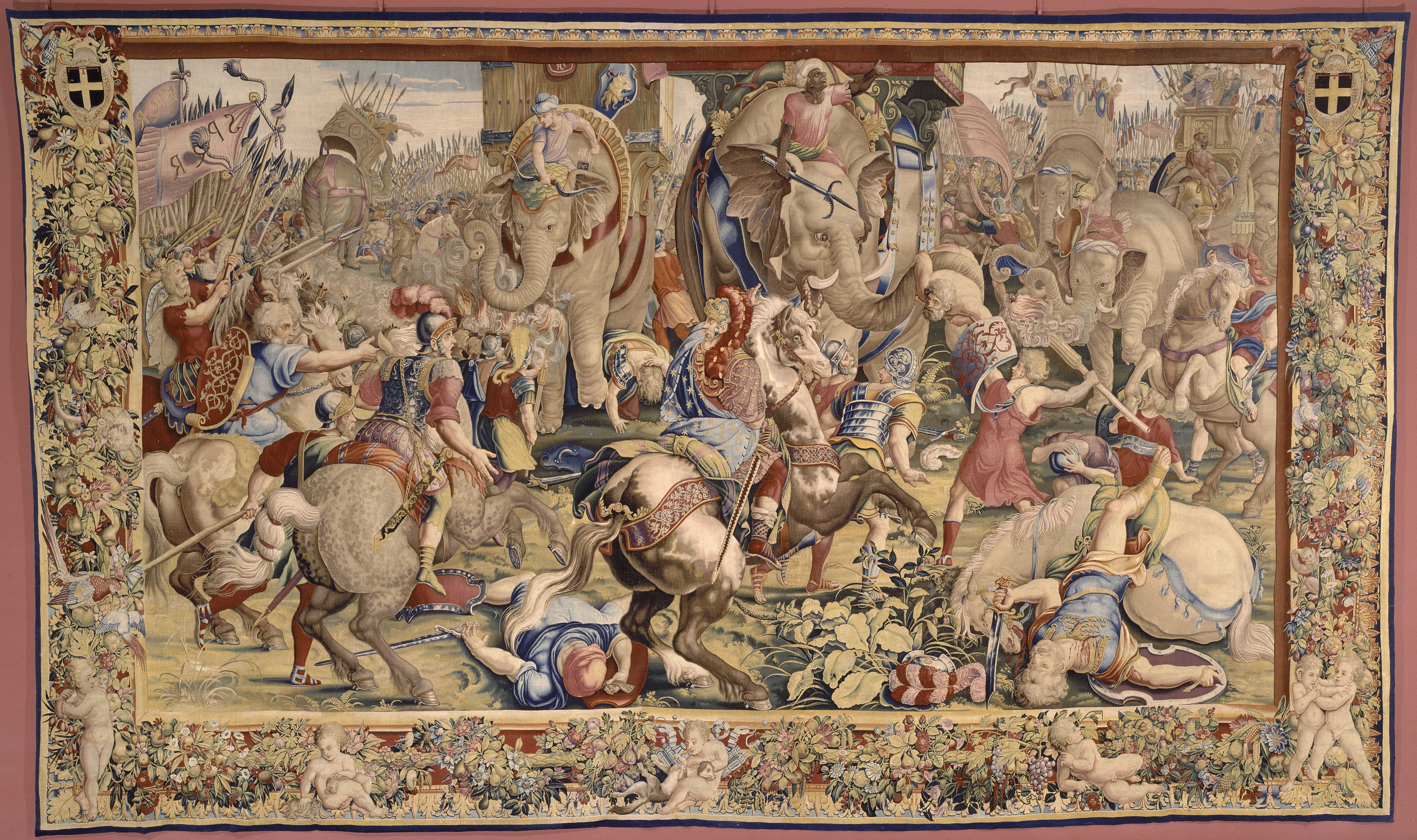
Battle of Zama tapestry after Jules Romain, manufactured for Louis XIV in 1688–1690 (Louvre Museum)

== Overview ==
It is best known as a royal factory supplying the court of the French monarchs since Louis XIV, and it is now run by the General Administration of the National Furniture and National Manufactures of Carpets and Tapestries (French: Administration générale du Mobilier national et des Manufactures nationales de tapis et tapisseries) of the French Ministry of Culture. The factory is open for guided tours several afternoons per week by appointment, as well as for casual visits every day except Mondays and some specific holidays. The Galerie des Gobelins is dedicated to temporary exhibitions of tapestries from the French manufactures and furnitures from the Mobilier National, built in the gardens by Auguste Perret in 1937. Along with Ōshima-tsumugi from Japan, and Persian carpets, Gobelin Tapestry are considered to be one of the worlds greatest textiles.

== History ==
The Gobelins were a family of dyers who, in the middle of the 15th century, established themselves in the Faubourg Saint-Marcel, Paris, on the banks of the Bièvre.

=== Comans-La Planche workshop ===
In 1602, Henry IV of France rented factory space from the Gobelins for his Flemish tapestry makers, Marc de Comans and François de la Planche, at the location of the modern Gobelins Manufactory adjoining the Bièvre river. In 1629, their sons Charles de Comans and Raphaël de la Planche took over their fathers' tapestry workshops, and in 1633, Charles was the head of the Gobelins manufactory. Their partnership ended around 1650, and the workshops were split into two. Tapestries from this early, Flemish period are sometimes called pre-gobelins.

=== Colbert and Le Brun ===
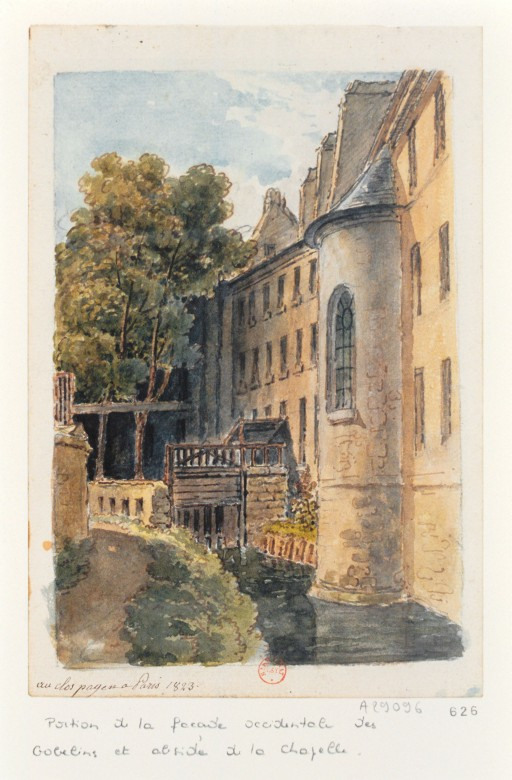
Rear view in 1830 of the Gobelins Manufactory, adjoining the river Bièvre

In 1662, the works in the Faubourg Saint Marcel, with the adjoining grounds, were purchased by Jean-Baptiste Colbert on behalf of Louis XIV and made into a general upholstery factory, in which designs both in tapestry and in all kinds of furniture were executed under the superintendence of the court painter, Charles Le Brun, who served as director and chief designer from 1663–1690. On account of Louis XIV's financial problems, the establishment was closed in 1694, but reopened in 1697 for the manufacture of tapestry, chiefly for royal use. It rivalled the Beauvais tapestry works until the French Revolution, when work at the factory was suspended.

The factory was revived during the Bourbon Restoration and, in 1826, the manufacture of carpets was added to that of tapestry. In 1871, the building was partly burned down during the Paris Commune.

The factory remains in operation as a state-run institution.

== Historical site ==
The modern manufactory consists of a set of four irregular buildings dating to the seventeenth century, plus the building on the avenue des Gobelins built by Jean-Camille Formigé in 1912 after the 1871 fire. They contain Le Brun's residence and workshops that served as foundries for most of the bronze statues in the park of Versailles, as well as looms on which tapestries are woven following seventeenth century techniques.

The Gobelins still produces some limited amount of tapestries for the decoration of French governmental institutions, with contemporary subjects.

The museum's gallery reopened to the public on May 12, 2007. Important exhibitions are organized regularly.

== Fulham connection ==
A branch of the manufactory was established in London probably in the early 18th-century in the area that is now Fulham High Street. Around 1753 it appears to have been taken over by the priest and adventurer, Pierre Parisot, but closed only a few years later.

== Gallery ==
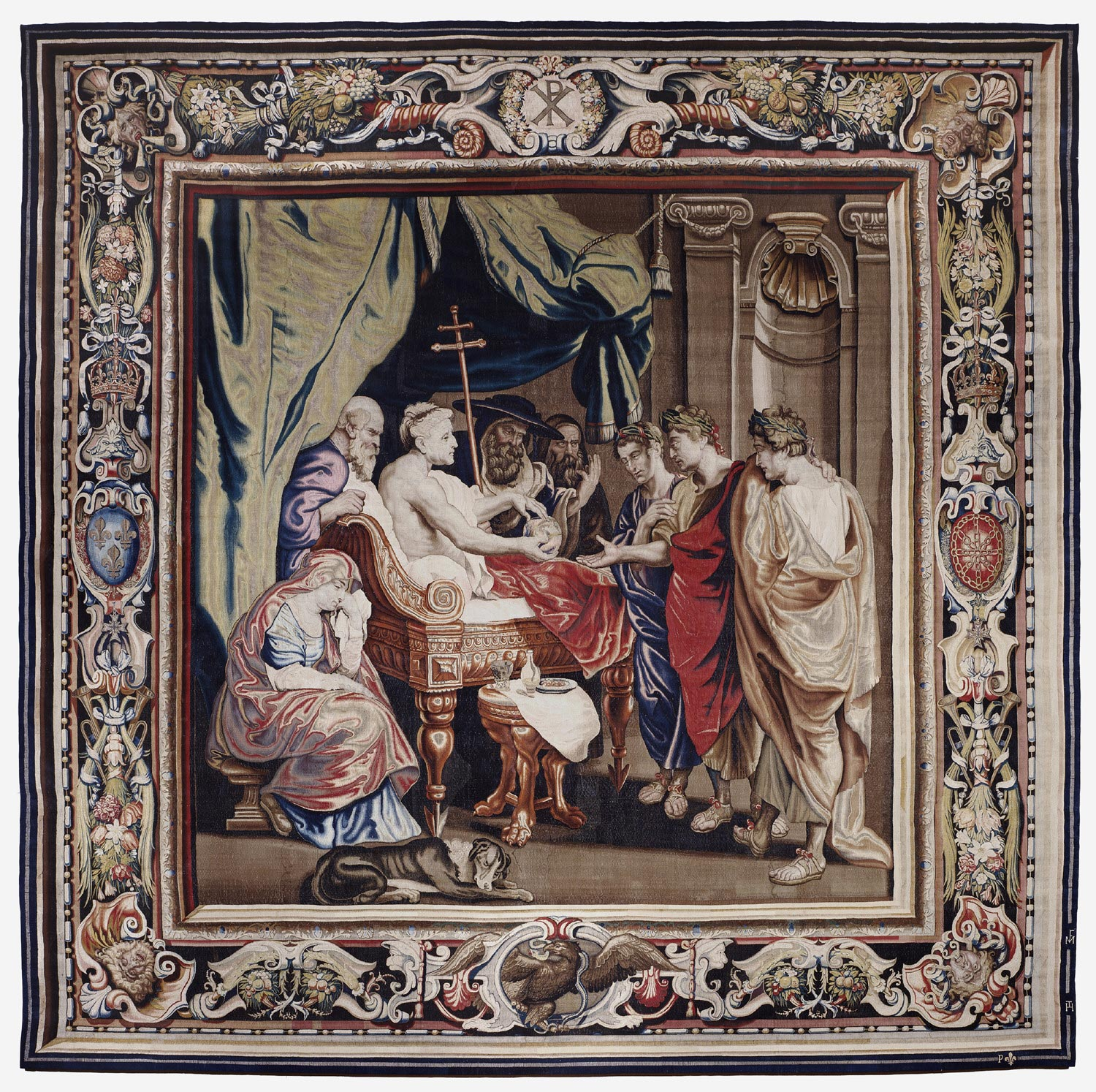
Death of Constantine tapestry (one in a series) after a design by Rubens woven by Filippe Maëcht and Hans Taye in the Comans-La Planche workshop, 1623–1625.

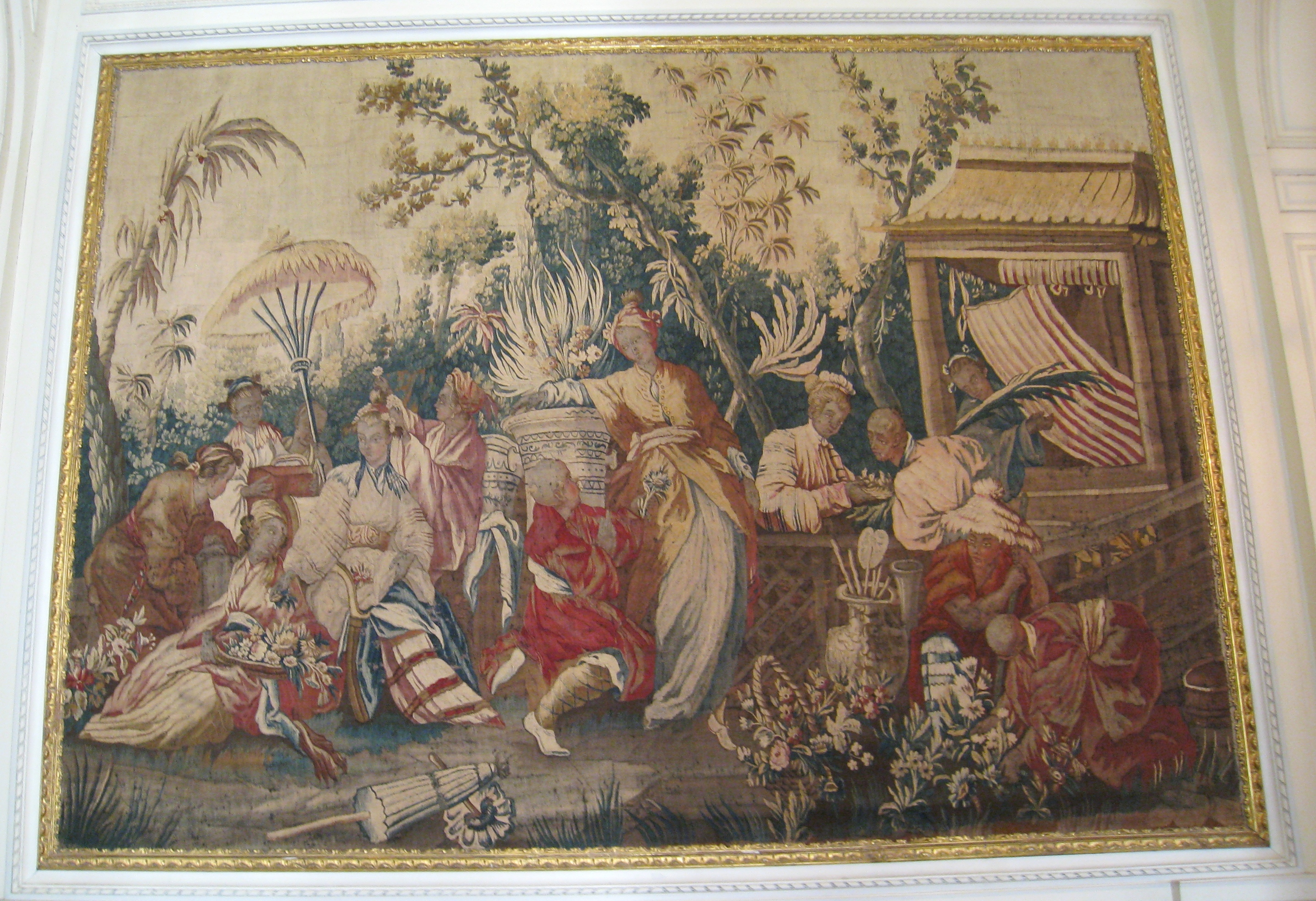
Gobelins tapestry, circa 1680, in the Musée Nissim de Camondo, Paris.

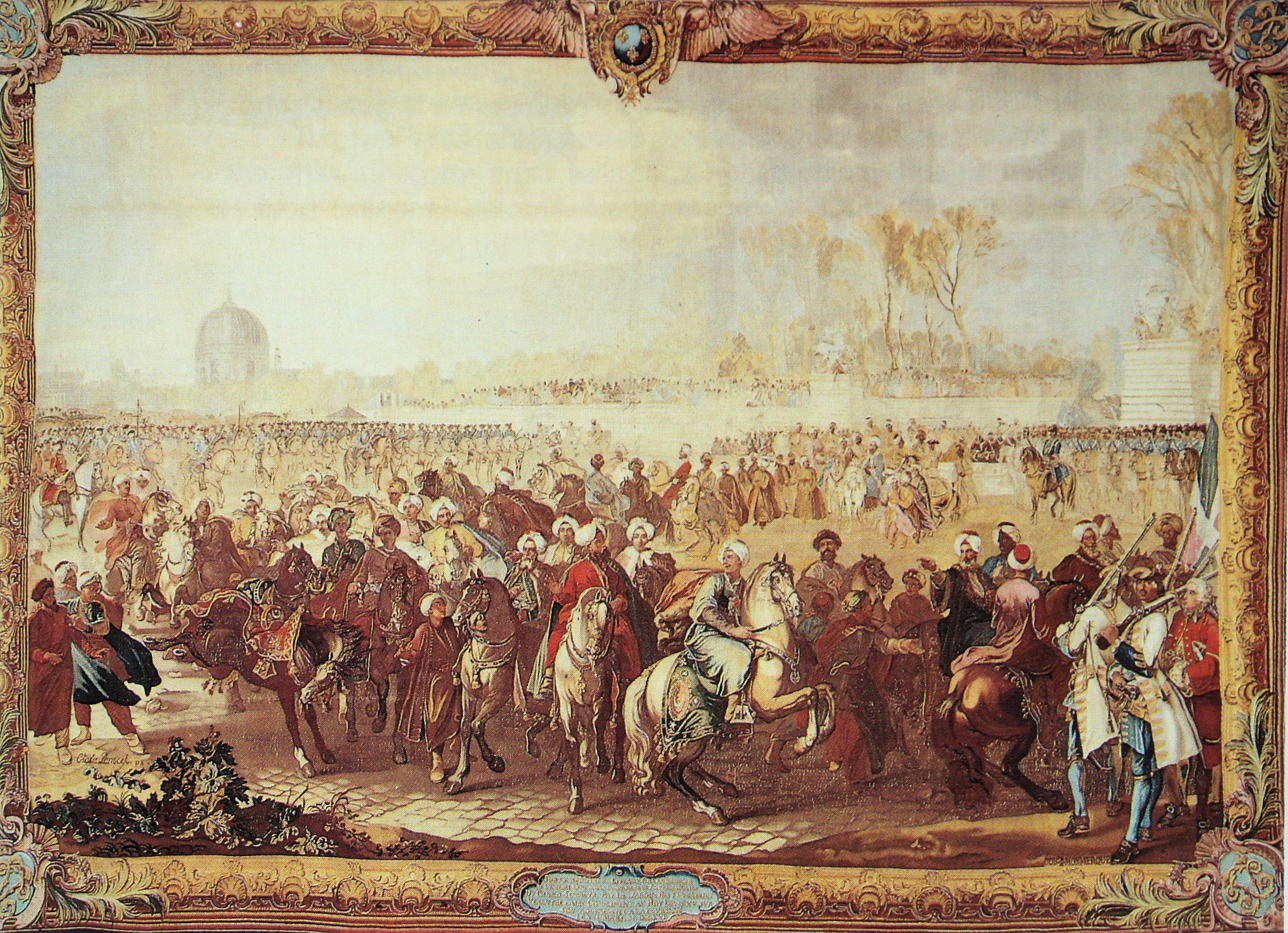
La sortie de l'Ambassadeur Turc du Jardin des Tuileries (Ottoman Empire embassy of Mehemet Effendi), Atelier Lefebvre et Mommerqué, Gobelins, 1734–1737.

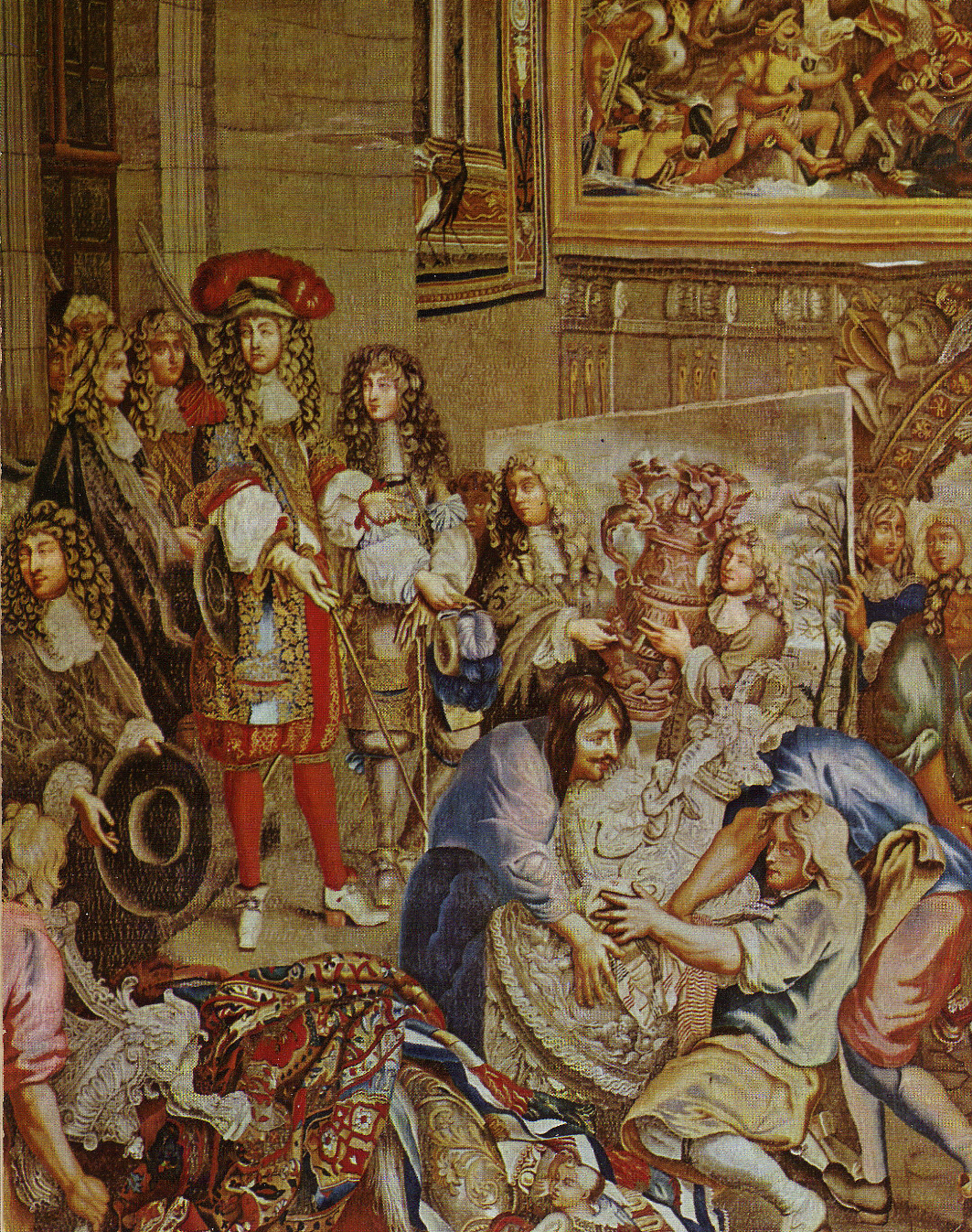
Louis XIV visits the Gobelins with Colbert, 15 October 1667. Tapestry from the series "Histoire du roi" designed by Charles Le Brun and woven between 1667 and 1672.

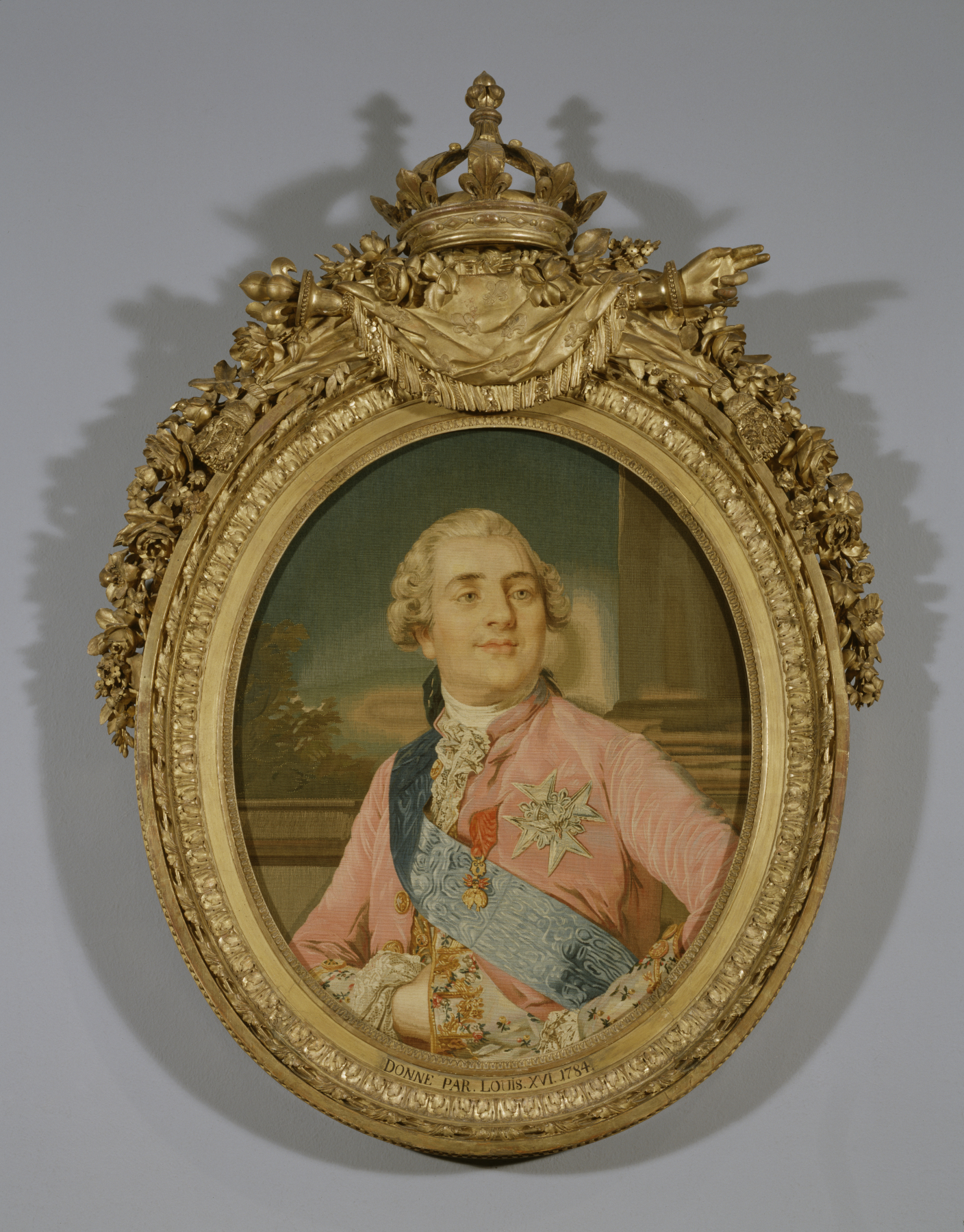
Portrait of Louis XVI (1745–93). Tapestry produced by Gobelins Manufactory.

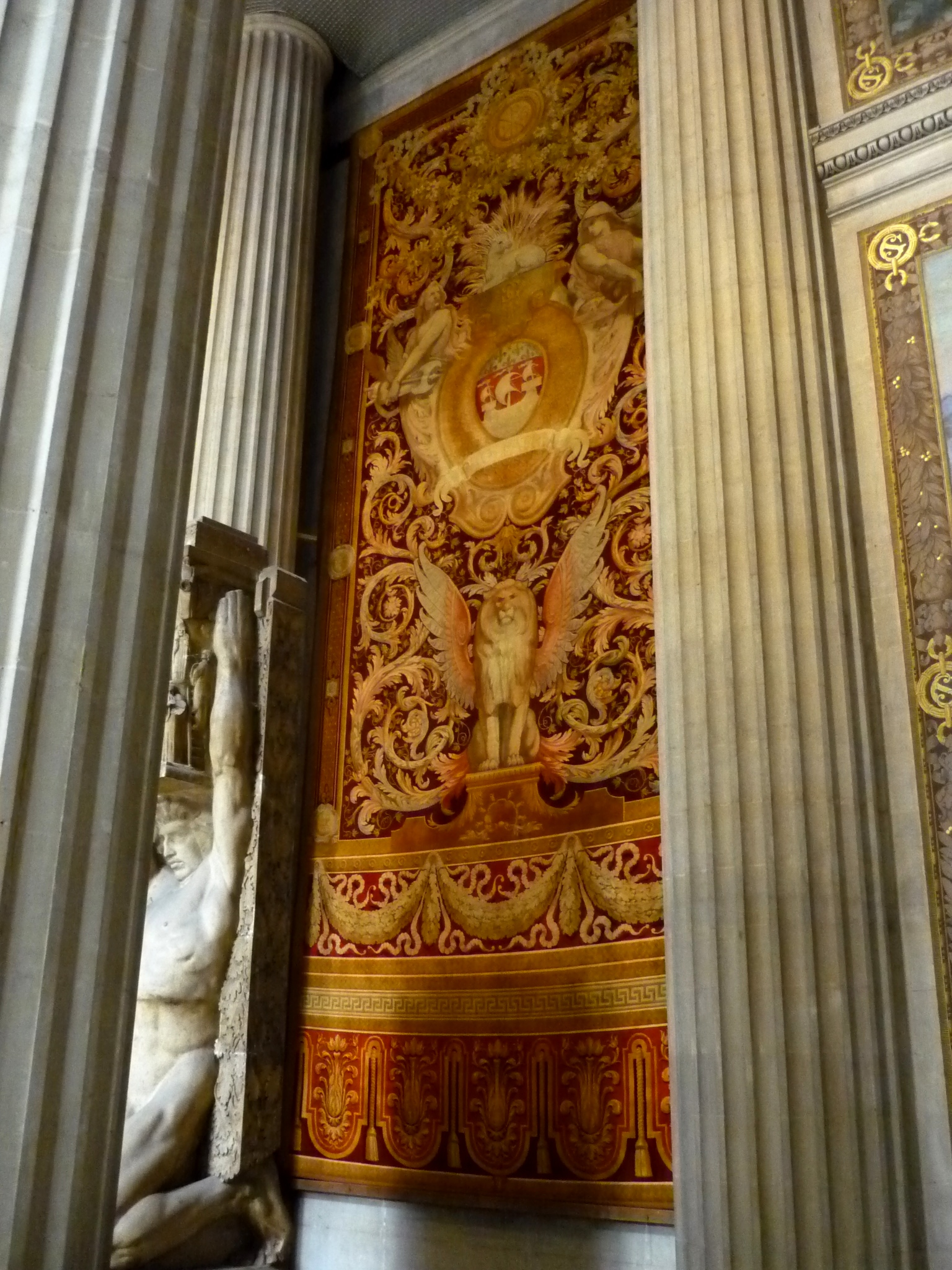
Tapestry in the Panthéon, Paris.

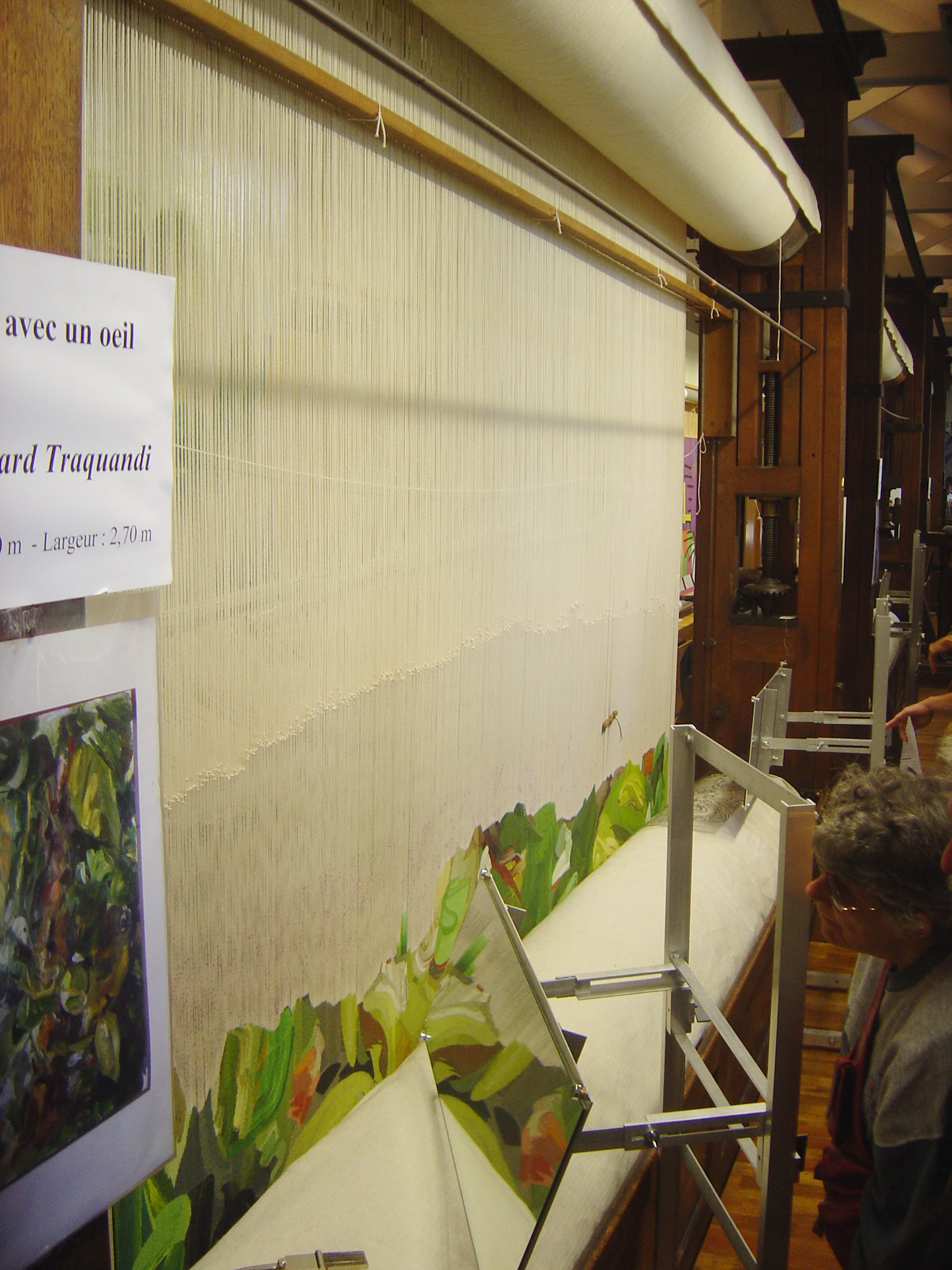
A "high-warp" (haute lisse) loom.

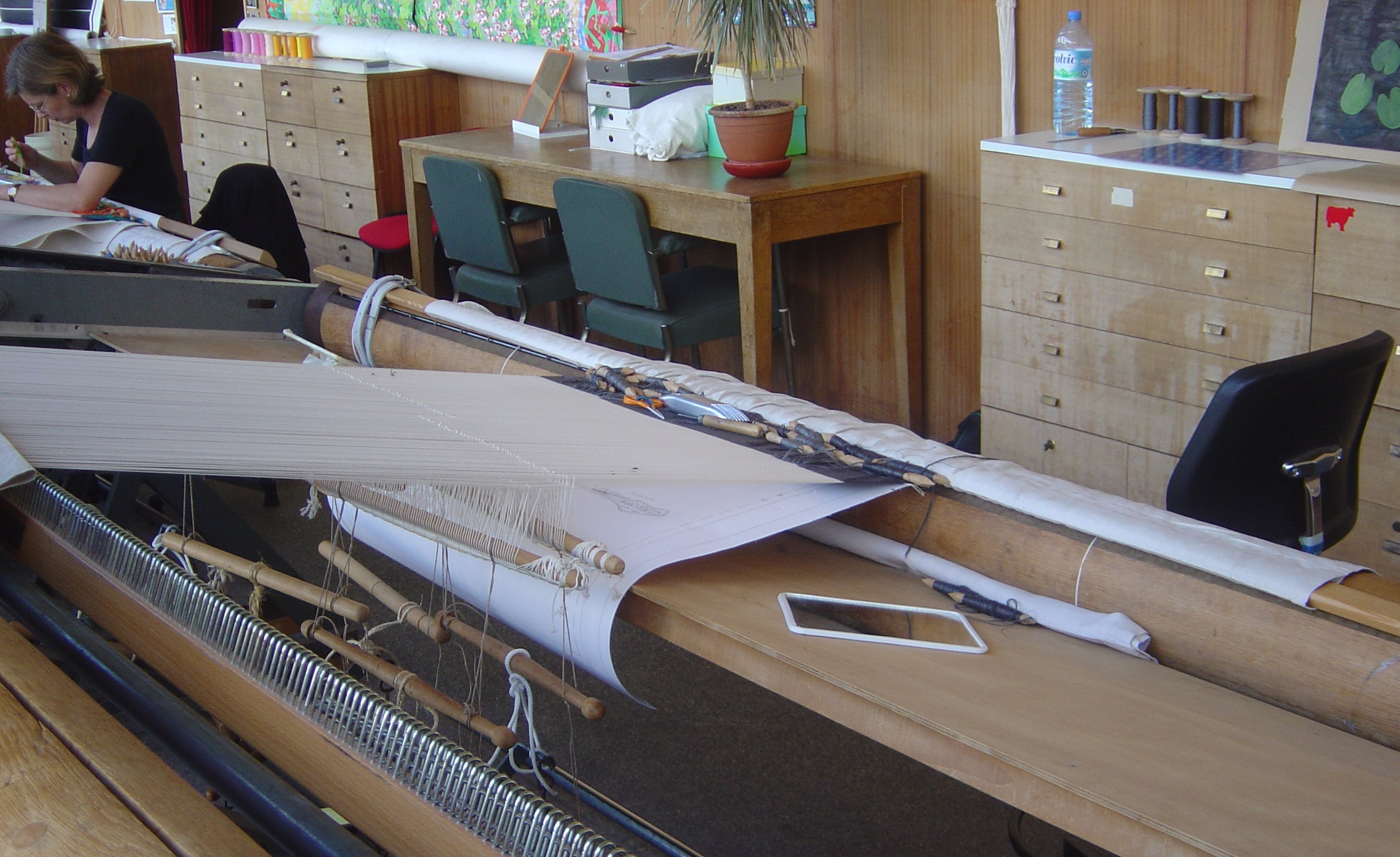
A "low-warp" (basse lisse) loom, used for smaller pieces.

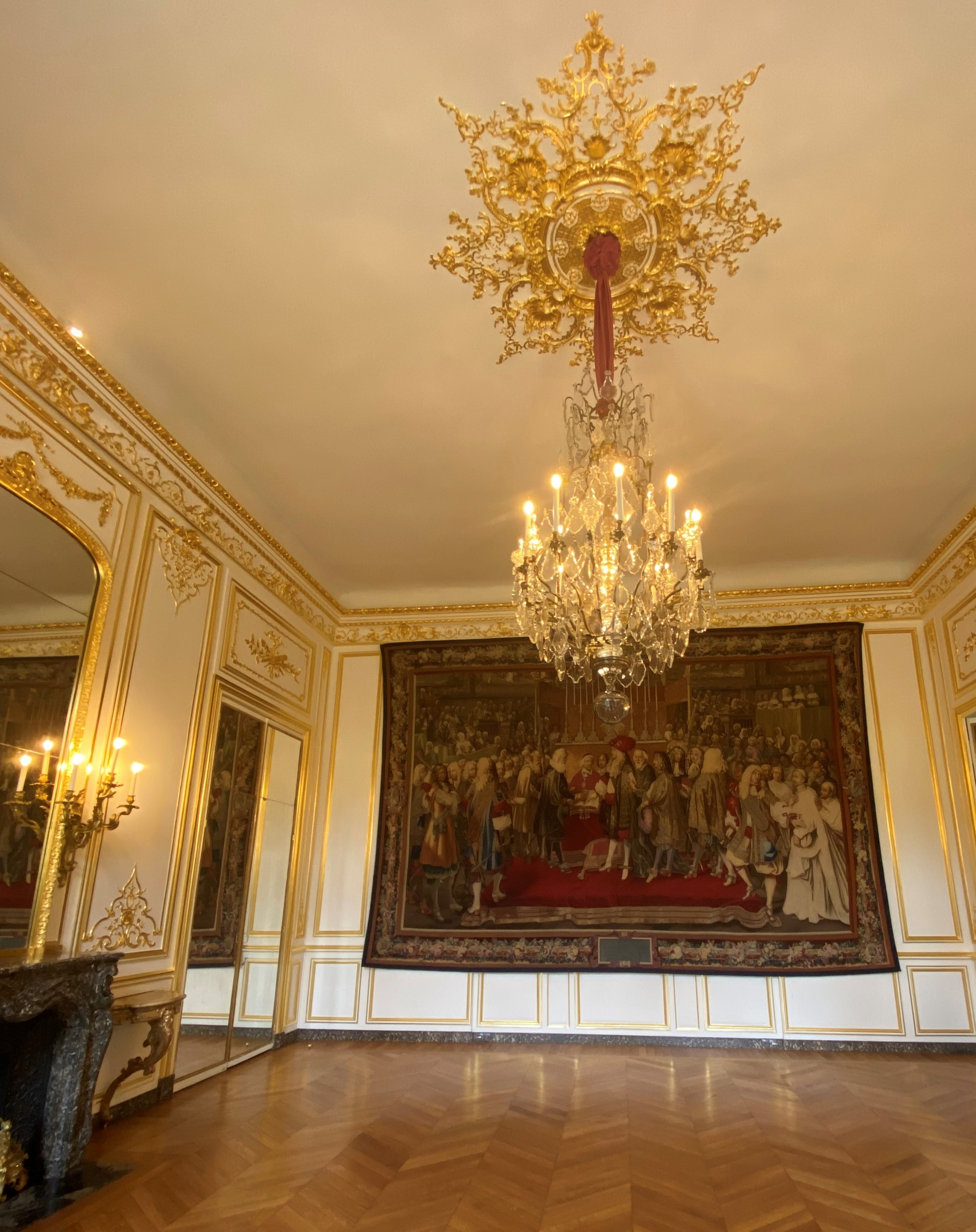
The 17th century Franco-Swiss Alliance Tapestry, at the Hôtel de Besenval. In the foreground King Louis XIV (right) and the Swiss politician Johann Heinrich Waser. Tapestry from the series "Histoire du Roi".

== See also ==
- List of museums in Paris
- Beauvais Manufactory
- Moravská Gobelínová Manufaktura
