= Pierre Parisot =

Pierre Parisot (1697–1769) was a French priest of the Order of Friars Minor Capuchins and a missionary. He was called also Père Norbert, Curé Parisot, Norbert de Bar-le-Duc, Norbert de Lorraine, or Abbé Platel.

He opposed Jesuits and wrote against them in his Memoirs of the East Indian Missions in 1744, exposing the methods by which they were obtaining conversions.

== Early life ==
Parisot was born in Bar-le-Duc in 1697.

== Career ==
He became a Capuchin friar in 1716 was ordained to priesthood in 1729. In December 1736, he was appointed as the Procurator of the French mission and was sent to Malabar and later to Pondicherry. He stayed in India for four years, including three years in Pondicherry where he came in contact with Jesuits that led to a conflict.

== Conflict with Jesuits ==
During his stay in Pondicherry, he came in contact with Jesuits leading to a conflict on the issue of the struggle of the Malabaric rites. Claude de Visdelou, a French Jesuit missionary in China had issues in regulating and prohibiting the use of Chinese Rites. Visdelou had arrived in Pondicherry from China on June 25, 1709, long before Parisot. Visdelou remained in Pondicherry until his death as he was not allowed to return to France. As both Visdelou in exile and Pierre Parisot were living in the same House of the Capuchins in the same town, they had issues regarding Malabari rites and thus launched the conflict.

Upon his return to France, Parisot published Historical Memoirs of the Missions in the Indies - a vindictive work with regards to the Society of Jesus. However, his own Order of Friars Minor Capuchin didn't support him, and instead opposed him so strongly as to force him to move to England.

He supported himself in England with tapestry work. He established a tapestry and Turkish carpet manufactory in Paddington, under the patronage of the Duke of Cumberland. He moved it in 1753 to Fulham High Street (possibly on the site now home to building numbers 49-55) with the idea of a 'youth training scheme', where the Gobelins Manufactory had already been established. He eventually returned to France, under the name Abbé Platel, visiting Germany and Portugal while undergoing persecution.

After returning to France, he again wrote and published his principal work History of the Society of Jesus, from its first foundation by Ignatius Loyola in six volumes.

== Works ==
- Memoirs of the East Indian Missions in 1747.
- The Great Historical Dictionary (with Louise Moréri) (1740)
- Useful and necessary memoirs, sad and consoling, on the missions in the East Indies, etc. (1742)
- An account of the new manufactory of tapestry (1753)
- Very humble representations by Pierre Parisot of Lorraine, to the English nation (1755)
- History of the Society of Jesus, from its first foundation by Ignatius Loyola.
