= The Eight Bells, Hatfield =

Pub in Hatfield, Hertfordshire, England

Coordinates: 51.7625°N 0.2135°W

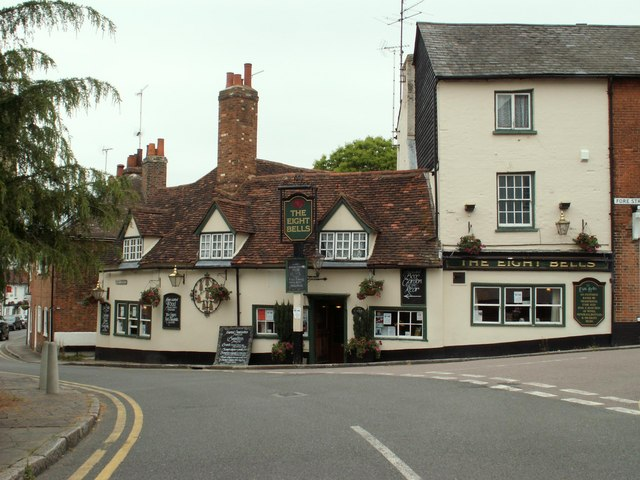
The Eight Bells

The Eight Bells is a grade II listed public house in Park Street, Hatfield, Hertfordshire, England. The building has a timber frame from around the sixteenth century and a nineteenth-century front.

== Literary associations ==
The pub has associations with the author Charles Dickens. Dickens is known to have stayed there in the 1830s, and it is believed to be the pub in Hatfield visited by his fictional character Bill Sikes.
