= Eight Bells, Fulham =

Pub in Fulham High Street, London, England

Coordinates: 51.4679°N 0.2101°W

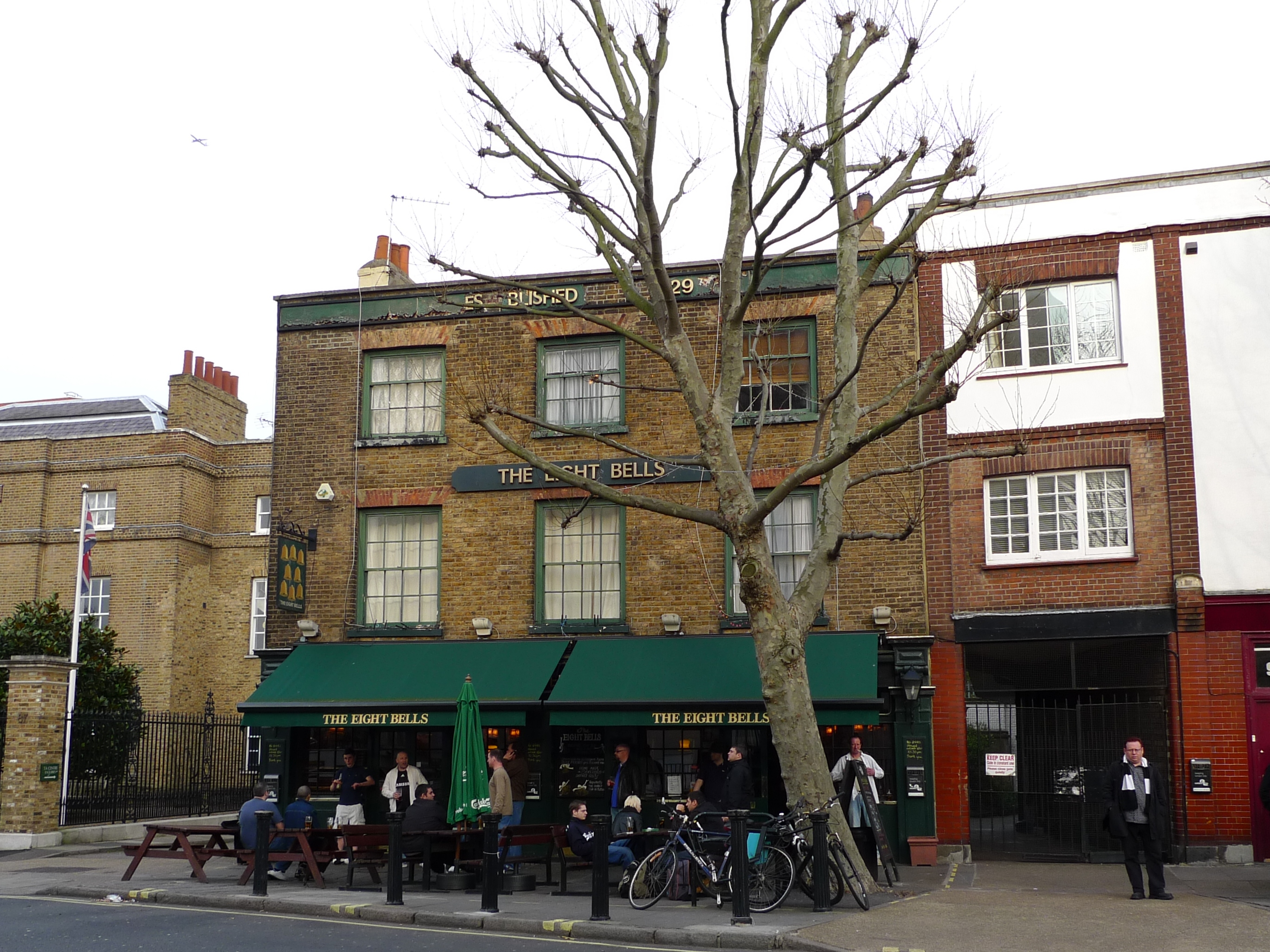
The Eight Bells, Fulham

The Eight Bells is a pub in Fulham High Street, close to the northern end of Putney Bridge.

The Eight Bells was the site of an early dog show, with a toy spaniel show in 1851.

In 1886, the original wooden Fulham Bridge was replaced by Putney Bridge to the west, and the Eight Bells received compensation for the loss of trade, as that end of Fulham High Street now became a quiet cul-de-sac.

From 1886 to 1888, Fulham Football Club used the pub as a changing room, as they played at the nearby Ranelagh House until that site was used for housing.

In 1986, Kenneth Erskine, the Hammersmith-born serial killer known as the Stockwell Strangler, raped and strangled his final victim, Florence Tisdall, an 83-year-old widow around the corner in Ranelagh Gardens Mansions, but any cries for help would have been drowned out by a disco at the Eight Bells to celebrate the wedding of Prince Andrew and Sarah Ferguson.

== History and Name ==
The public house was originally licensed as The Blue Anchor in 1629. Over the next century, it evolved to become The Anchor, then The Anchor and Eight Bells, before finally being shortened to The Eight Bells by around 1754.

The name The Eight Bells directly refers to the nautical timekeeping system used on ships in the 18th Century. Sailors divided the 24-hour day into four-hour duty watches. A ship's bell was struck every half-hour. Therefore, eight bells signified the completion of a full four-hour watch, indicating it was time for one crew to go off duty and the next watch crew to take over. This connection is proven by the pub's previous names. The pairing of the anchor and the watch-bells firmly cements its historical identity as a maritime and river-traveller tavern.

The ship's watch system divides the 24 -hour day into six 4-hour periods as follows:

- First Watch, 8pm to Midnight
- Middle Watch, Midnight to 4am
- Morning Watch, 4am to 8am
- Forenoon Watch, 8am to Noon
- Afternoon Watch, Noon to 4pm
- The Dog Watch, 4pm to 8pm

The Dog Watch was further divided into First and Second watches of two hours, each indicated by eight bells on completion, so that the crews moved through the watches and did not end up doing the same watches repeatedly.
