= Almost Invisible =

Live album by SubArachnoid Space
- Released: July 22, 1997
- Recorded: October 8 – November 9, 1996
- Genre: Space rock, psychedelic rock
- Length: 53:24
- Label: Release Entertainment

SubArachnoid Space chronology
Ether Or (1997)	Almost Invisible (1997)	Endless Renovation (1998)

Professional ratings
Review scores
Source	Rating
Allmusic	4.5/5 stars

Almost Invisible is a live performance album by SubArachnoid Space, released on July 22, 1997, by Release Entertainment.

== Track listing ==
All music is composed by SubArachnoid Space.

No.	Title	Length
1.	"Shut Inside"	7:30
2.	"Hidden Outside"	6:23
3.	"Floating Above the Skyline"	5:27
4.	"Below Any Border"	11:07
5.	"Outlined in Rust"	17:54
6.	"Calm Fever"	5:05

== Personnel ==
Adapted from the Almost Invisible liner notes.

SubArachnoid Space

- Melynda Jackson – guitar
- Mason Jones – guitar, bass guitar
- Michelle Schreiber – percussion

Production and additional personnel

- Myles Boisen – mastering
- SubArachnoid Space – cover art

== Release history ==
Region	Date	Label	Format	Catalog
United States	1997	Release Entertainment	CD	RR 6959
