= Eight Bells (band) =

- Origin: Portland, Oregon, United States
- Genres: Post-metal, doom metal, experimental metal
- Labels: Seventh Rule Recordings, The Flenser, Battleground Records, Prophecy Productions
- Members: Melynda Jackson, Evelyn Holland, Andrew Eguchi
- Website: Eight Bells official website

Eight Bells is an American experimental metal band based in Portland, Oregon, United States. It was formed by guitarist Melynda Jackson after SubArachnoid Space disbanded in 2011. She was joined by bassist Haley Westeiner and SubArachnoid Space drummer Christopher Van Huffel. They describe their music as expressionistic experimental metal. Their debut album, The Captain's Daughter, was released 19 February 2013 by Seventh Rule Recordings. The band toured in April 2013 to promote the album. Their follow-up, Landless, was released on February 12, 2016. They toured with Voivod and Vektor in the Northeastern United States in support of the album. In February 2018, Jackson announced a new lineup with Alyssa Maucere on bass, Brian Burke on drums, and Melynda Amann on synth and vocals. The band did a West Coast tour with Subrosa and made an appearance at Psycho Las Vegas. 2019 saw more lineup changes with Alyssa Maucere and Melynda Amann exiting and Matt Solis of Cormorant and URSA taking over on bass and vocals.

In November 2021, the band announced that they had completed the recording of their third album, Legacy of Ruin. It was released on 25 February 2022, followed by a handful of live performances on the West Coast and Canada.

2024 brought line-up changes with bassist Matt Solis and Drummer Brian Burke exiting the band, with drummer Andrew Eguchi, and Bassist Evelyn Holland as the newest additions.

== Discography ==
=== Studio albums ===
- The Captain's Daughter (2013)
- Landless (2016)
- Legacy of Ruin (2022)

=== Extended plays ===
- Isosceles (11 October 2011)
