= Bièvre (river) =

River in France

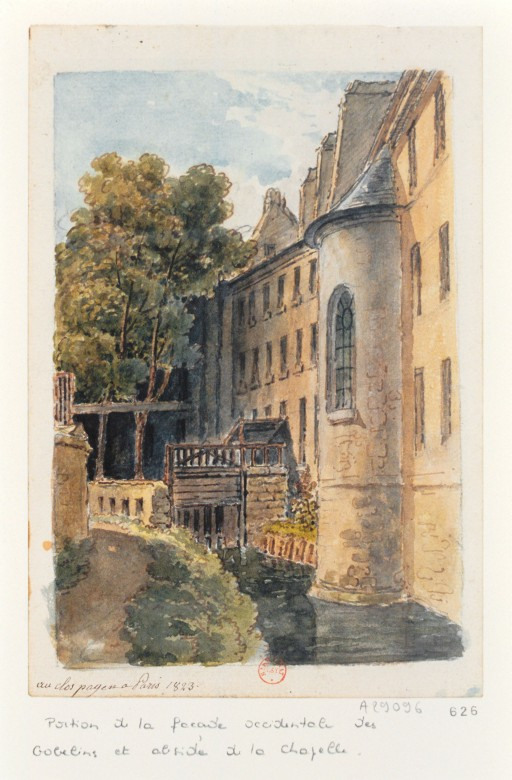
- Back of the Gobelins Manufactory, adjoining the Bièvre River, in 1830.

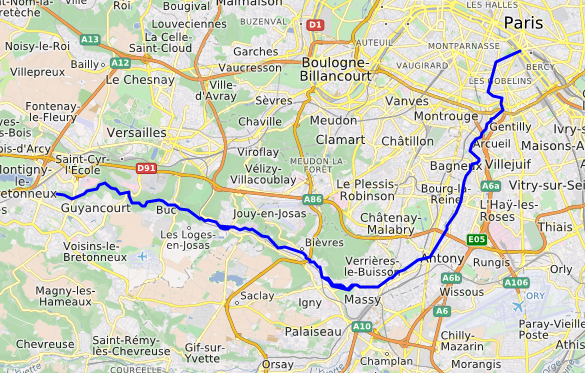

Location
- Country: France

Physical characteristics
- Source
  - location: Île-de-France
- Mouth
  - location: Seine
  - coordinates: 48°50′37″N 2°21′57″E
- Length: 34.6 km (21.5 mi)
- Basin size: 201 km^{2} (78 mi^{2})
- Discharge
  - average: 0.2 m^{3}/s (7.1 cu ft/s)

Basin features
- Progression: Seine→ English Channel

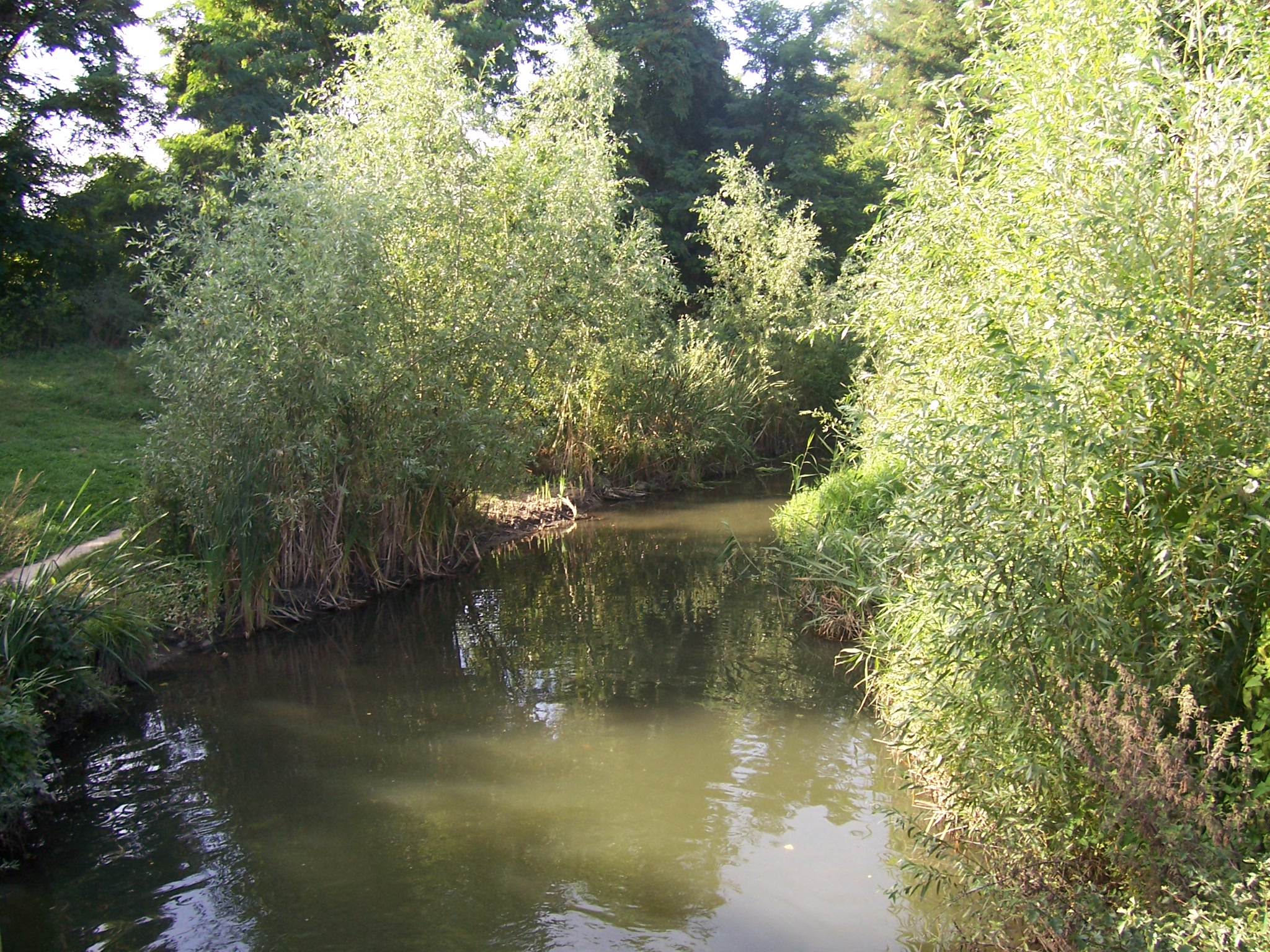
Bièvre at Fresnes

The Bièvre (French pronunciation: [bjɛvʁ]) is a 34.6-kilometre (21.5 mi) long river of the Île-de-France région that flows into the Seine (left bank) in Paris.

== Name ==
The name is often thought to derive from the archaic French word bièvre meaning "beaver". Other suggested origins are a Celtic word for "mud", Latin bibere "to drink", and French bief, a word describing the man-made canals that carried water to mill wheels.

== Course ==
The source of the Bièvre is in Guyancourt, département Yvelines. From there, it flows through the following départements and towns:

- Yvelines: Jouy-en-Josas
- Essonne: Bièvres, Massy
- Hauts-de-Seine: Antony
- Val de Marne: Fresnes, L'Haÿ-les-Roses, Cachan, Arcueil, Gentilly

The river enters Paris near Stade Charléty (close to the border between the 13th and 14th arrondissements), and reaches the Seine River in the Latin Quarter (5th arrondissement) close to Île de la Cité.

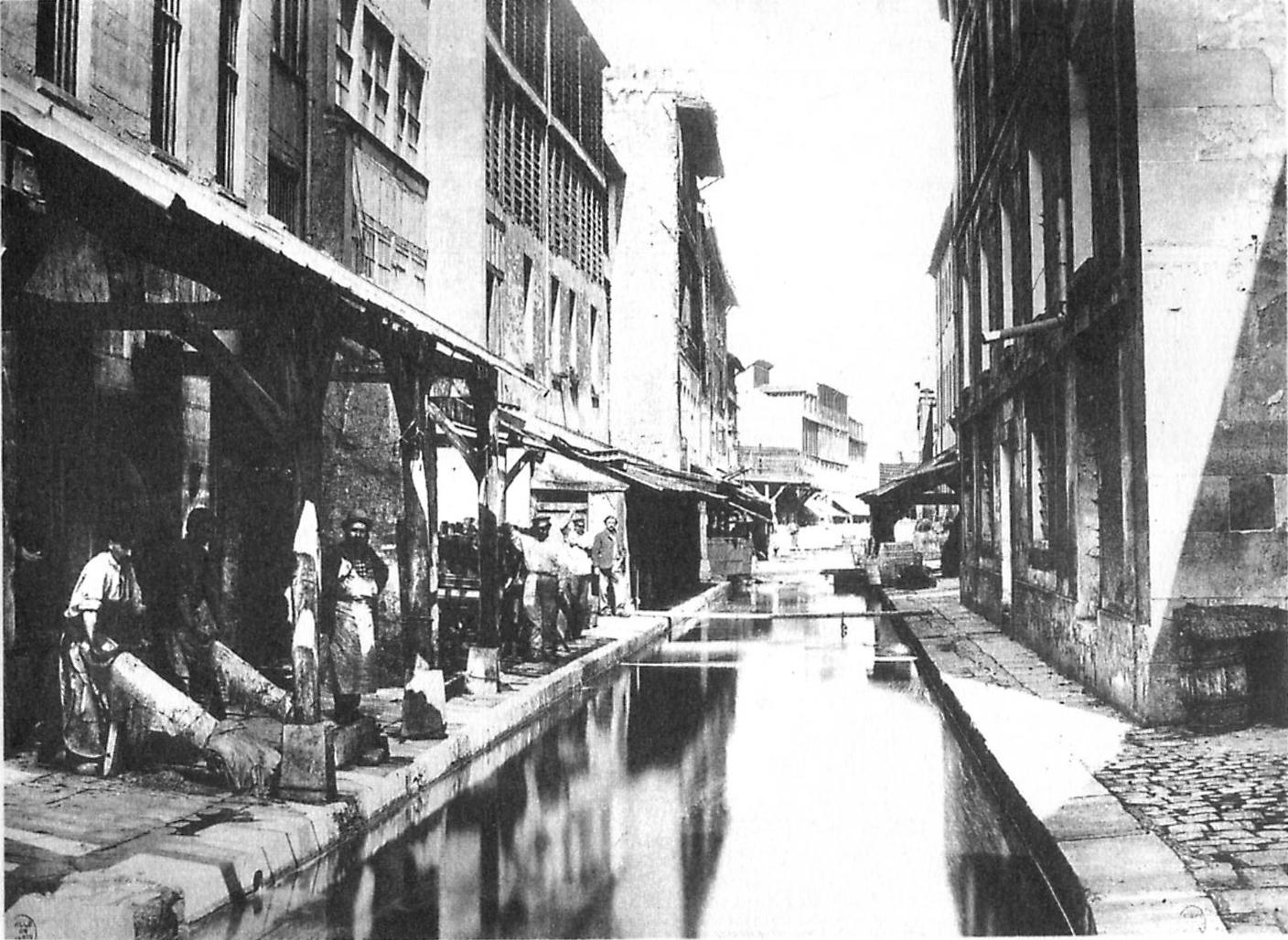
Tanneries along the Bièvre, late 19th-century

The Bièvre was diverted from its original course in 1148 by the monks of the abbey of Saint-Victor. This diversion is reflected in maps of Paris dating from the 13th century. Historically the river was heavily industrialized with mills, which led to the straightening of the river. Tanneries, slaughterhouses and dye-makers were built along its banks, leading to serious pollution concerns.

Starting in the 18th century, the river was gradually culverted. Eleven kilometers are canalised under slabs and 5 km have disappeared under rubble and urbanisation in Paris. In modern times the Bièvre forms a rainwater system.

== Restoration project ==
In 2003, 200m of the Bièvre was re-opened in the Parc des Près in Fresnes. At the same time, over twenty direct wastewater connections to the Bièvre were eliminated. When the river is completely disconnected from the wastewater system, the stormwater from the river will no longer flow into a wastewater treatment plant but will instead flow directly into the River Seine, which is expected to lead to significant savings in wastewater treatment costs.

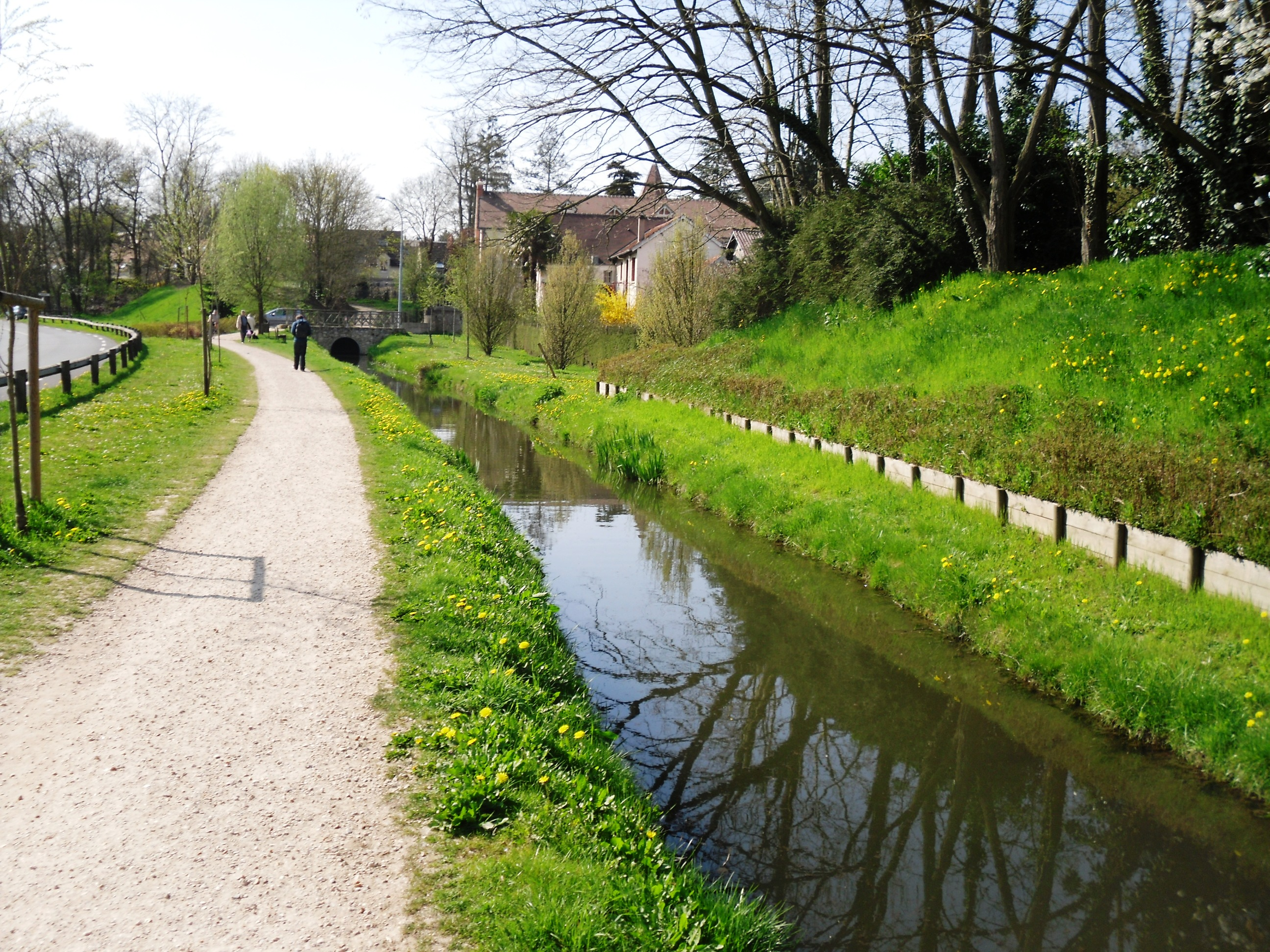
Bièvre at Massy

Another section of the Bièvre between Massy and Verrières was re-opened in 2006.

== See also ==
- River Fleet in London
