= Mason Jones (guitarist) =

American guitarist

- Genres: Experimental rock, psychedelic rock, space rock, post-rock
- Occupation: Musician
- Instrument: Guitar
- Years active: 1988–present
- Label: Charnel Music
- Website: www.charnel.com

Mason Jones is a San Francisco-based guitarist, graphic designer, music journalist, audio engineer and independent record label owner.

Jones is a founding member of the psychedelic rock act SubArachnoid Space and for the music released under his monikers, such as Dada Fish, Numinous Eye and Trance. In 1988 he founded the music label Charnel Music which specialized in psychedelic, experimental and noise music.

== Biography ==
Mason Jones formed the improvisation-based psychedelic project SubArachnoid Space in late 1995 with bassist Jason Stein and drummer Michelle Schreibner. After adding second guitarist Melynda Jackson to the line-up, the ensemble issued their full-length debut in 1996, titled Delicate Membrane. Their second album Ether Or and live album Almost Invisible followed in 1997. In 1998 Release Entertainment, a sub-label of Relapse Records issued Endless Renovation, which expanded the band's sound with arrangements for synthesizer, cello and violin. The group collaborated with guitarist Scott Ayers' Walking Timebombs project, which yielded the album The Sleeping Sickness in 1999. Another live album titled These Things Take Time followed in fall 2000.

Mason Jones also began issuing solo work under his own name, starting with International Incident in 1998. The album collected tracks recorded live during two tours of Japan in 1995 and 1997 and featured performances by KK Null, Seiichi Yamamoto and members of Acid Mothers Temple. He followed that release with 1999's Midnight In The Twilight Factory, which comprised four lengthy improvs that were recorded direct to DAT.
