= Eight Bells (album) =

Studio album by SubArachnoid Space
- Released: September 22, 2009
- Recorded: Audible Alchemy (Portland, OR)
- Genres: Space rock, psychedelic rock
- Length: 37:14
- Label: Crucial Blast
- Producers: Steven Wray Lobdell, SubArachnoid Space

SubArachnoid Space chronology
The Red Veil (2005)	Eight Bells (2009)

Professional ratings
Review scores
Source	Rating
Allmusic	3.5/5 stars

Eight Bells is the sixth and final studio album by SubArachnoid Space, released on September 22, 2009 by Crucial Blast.

== Track listing ==
All music is composed by SubArachnoid Space.

No.	Title	Length
1.	"Lilith"	5:17
2.	"Hunter Seeker"	13:30
3.	"Akathesia"	6:15
4.	"Haruspex"	5:17
5.	"Bird Signs"	6:55

== Personnel ==
Adapted from the Eight Bells liner notes.

SubArachnoid Space

- Daniel Barone – bass guitar
- Melynda Jackson – guitar
- Steven Wray Lobdell – acoustic guitar, percussion, production, engineering, mixing, mastering
- Lauren K Newman – drums
- Daniel Osborne – guitar

Production and additional personnel

- Stephen Kasner – cover art
- SubArachnoid Space – production
- Adam Wright – design

== Release history ==
Region	Date	Label	Format	Catalog
United States	2009	Crucial Blast	CD	CBR81
United States	2010	Strange Attractors Audio House	LP	SAAH057
