= Melynda Jackson =

American guitarist

- Genres: Black and doom influenced experimental metal
- Occupation: Musician
- Instruments: Guitar, Vocals
- Years active: 1995–present
- Labels: Seventh Rule Recordings, The Flenser and Battleground Records

Melynda Jackson is an American guitarist recognized for her work in SubArachnoid Space (1996–2010) and her current project, Eight Bells (2010–present). She is known as an experimental musician using effects to create emotive and bleakly atmospheric soundscapes. She credits a range of influences including '70s prog and krautrock (Genesis, Popol Vuh, Magma), ambient and minimalist composers (Brian Eno, Steve Reich), and progressive black and death metal (Enslaved, Ulver, Death, Gorguts).
