= Double Live (Butthole Surfers album) =

- Kathleen Lynch, naked dancer, greeting Butthole Surfers fans on the front cover, slightly deformed with a bigger head and an alien-like spine compared to the original photo.

Live album by Butthole Surfers
- Released: 1989 (vinyl); 1990 (CD)
- Recorded: Winter 1988; Various locations
- Length: 90:00 (vinyl); 131:50 (CD)
- Label: Latino Buggerveil

Butthole Surfers chronology
Hairway to Steven (1988)	Double Live (1989)	Widowermaker (1989)

Alternative cover
- Back cover of the CD edition, indicating it's a numbered edition DAT bootleg recording, and with the advice "VERY LOUD IT PLAY", as noted at the Rolling Stone Album Guide.

Professional ratings
Review scores
Source	Rating
Allmusic	2/5 stars
Rolling Stone	3/5 stars

Double Live is a live double album by American punk band Butthole Surfers, released on vinyl and cassette tape in 1989. An expanded CD edition followed in 1990. All songs were written by Butthole Surfers, except: "The One I Love," written by Bill Berry, Peter Buck, Mike Mills, and Michael Stipe of R.E.M.; "Paranoid," written by Mark Farner of Grand Funk Railroad; "No Rule," written by Jonas Almqvist of Leather Nun; and "Kuntz," a distorted version of "The Fear (กลัวดวง)" written by Kong Katkamngae and performed by Phloen Phromdaen, two Thai artists.

This was the first album released on the band's own label, Latino Buggerveil. It was limited to 10,000 vinyl printings, 7,500 cassettes, and 4,750 CDs, U.S. and U.K. combined. All three are out of print, though MP3s of the entire CD edition are available as free downloads from Butthole Surfers' official website.

== Music ==
Double Live is a comprehensive live document of Butthole Surfers' then-current lineup – a group that had been playing together non-stop for five years (with the exception of bass player Jeff Pinkus).

In addition to showcasing and, for the first time, officially naming nearly every track from 1988's Hairway to Steven, the album includes live performances of songs from all of Butthole Surfers' previous studio releases, including Butthole Surfers, Psychic... Powerless... Another Man's Sac, Cream Corn from the Socket of Davis, Rembrandt Pussyhorse, and Locust Abortion Technician. It also features "Psychedelic Jam," an instrumental that had been a staple of the band's live set since 1984, and "Strawberry." "Psychedelic Jam" eventually appeared with the addition of vocals and in slightly rearranged form as "P.S.Y." on 1991's piouhgd, while "Strawberry" eventually appeared on 1993's Independent Worm Saloon .

This album also finds the band covering some songs by other artists, such as R.E.M., Grand Funk Railroad, and Leather Nun, as well as their infamous reworking of Black Sabbath's "Sweet Leaf," retitled "Sweatloaf" (a.k.a. "Sweat Loaf").

== Background ==
Butthole Surfers released Double Live in response to widespread, for-profit bootlegging of their live performances. It boasted mildly better sound quality than that available on true bootlegs. Ric Wallace, the band's sound engineer used a portable DAT recorder and a stereo microphone at the "Front of House" mix position to tape the songs during concerts in the winter of 1988 while touring to support their Hairway to Steven studio album.

Copies of the album were pressed in both the U.S. and the U.K., with the U.K. pressing offering marginally better transitions and sound quality than the U.S. edition. The free MP3s available from the band's website are taken from the album's U.K. pressing.

The Mark Farner-written Grand Funk Railroad cover, "Paranoid," was a bit of an inside joke, as Butthole Surfers owned a female pit bull named Mark Farner of Grand Funk Railroad.

== Track listing ==
All songs written by Butthole Surfers except where noted. The song titles listed below match those used on the vinyl and CD editions of Double Live. Many differ from the official titles used on Butthole Surfers' studio albums.

=== Vinyl edition ===
==== Side 1 ====
1. "Too Parter" – 4:03 ^{1}
2. "Psychedelic Jam" – 8:41 ^{2}
3. "Ricky" – 2:42
4. "Rocky" – 3:37
5. "Gary Floyd" – 1:47

==== Side 2 ====
1. "Florida" – 3:43 ^{3}
2. "John E. Smoke" – 7:03
3. "Tornadoes" – 2:47
4. "Pittsburg to Lebanon" – 3:00
5. "The One I Love" (Berry/Buck/Mills/Stipe) – 7:57

==== Side 3 ====
1. "Graveyard" – 4:01
2. "Sweatloaf" – 3:57 ^{4}
3. "Backass" – 6:02
4. "Paranoid" (Farner) – 5:45
5. "Fast" – 1:47 ^{5}

==== Side 4 ====
1. "I Saw an X-Ray of a Girl Passing Gas" – 4:18
2. "Strawberry" – 3:25
3. "Jimi" – 7:34
4. "Lou Reed" – 9:35 ^{6}

=== CD edition ===
The expanded 1990 CD edition contained 10 additional songs (*) not available on the vinyl version.

This whole album is available on Butthole Surfers' website.

==== Disc 1 ====
1. "Too Parter" – 4:03 ^{1}
2. "Psychedelic Jam" – 8:41 ^{2}
3. "Ricky" – 2:42
4. "Rocky" – 3:37
5. "Gary Floyd" – 1:47
6. "Florida" – 3:43 ^{3}
7. "John E. Smoke" – 7:03
8. "Tornadoes" – 2:47
9. "Pittsburg to Lebanon" – 3:00
10. "The One I Love" (Berry/Buck/Mills/Stipe) – 7:57
11. "Hey" – 2:30 *
12. "Dum Dum" – 3:00 *
13. "No Rule" (Almqvist) – 2:11 *
14. "U.S.S.A." – 4:21 *
15. "Comb" – 8:01 ^{7} *

==== Disc 2 ====
1. "Graveyard" – 2:35
2. "Sweatloaf" – 5:23 ^{4}
3. "Backass" – 6:02
4. "Paranoid" (Farner) – 5:45
5. "Fast" – 1:30 ^{5}
6. "I Saw an X-Ray of a Girl Passing Gas" – 4:26
7. "Strawberry" – 3:25
8. "Jimi" – 7:34
9. "Lou Reed" – 9:35 ^{6}
10. "Kuntz" (Katkamngae) – 2:30 *
11. "22 Going on 23" – 4:07 *
12. "Creep in the Cellar" – 2:40 *
13. "Suicide" – 1:36 *
14. "Something" – 9:31 *

^{1} a.k.a. "Too Partner" and "Two Part"
^{2} a.k.a. "P.S.Y.," "Psycho Jam," and "Psychedelic"
^{3} a.k.a. "Moving to Florida"
^{4} a.k.a. "Sweat Loaf"
^{5} a.k.a. "Fart Song"
^{6} a.k.a. "Comb"
^{7} a.k.a. "Lou Reed" (U.K.), "Jimi" and "Lou Reed" are connected.

^{*} Only available on the CD edition.

== Personnel ==
- Gibby Haynes – lead vocals, guitar
- Paul Leary – guitar, lead vocals ("Gary Floyd," "Paranoid," and "Something")
- Jeff Pinkus – bass
- King Coffey – drums
- Teresa Nervosa – drums

== Charts ==
Chart (1989)	Peak position
UK Indie Chart	4
