= The Hurdy Gurdy Man (EP) =

EP by Butthole Surfers
- Released: November 16, 1990
- Recorded: 1990
- Genre: Avant-garde, hardcore punk, neo-psychedelia
- Length: 17:04 (U.S. CD version)
- Label: Rough Trade

Butthole Surfers chronology
Widowermaker (1989)	The Hurdy Gurdy Man (1990)	piouhgd (1991)

Professional ratings
Review scores
Source	Rating
AllMusic	3/5 stars

The Hurdy Gurdy Man is a studio EP by American alternative rock band Butthole Surfers, released in 1990.

The EP was named after its title track, "The Hurdy Gurdy Man," written by 1960s pop star Donovan. All versions also included one original Butthole Surfers song, "Barking Dogs," and most versions also included a remix of "The Hurdy Gurdy Man."

Both songs were also part of 1991's piouhgd, marking the first time that songs from a Butthole Surfers EP were officially included on a later album. (The contents of Cream Corn from the Socket of Davis were included on CD editions of Rembrandt Pussyhorse in the U.S. and Psychic... Powerless... Another Man's Sac in the U.K., but are not considered official parts of those albums.)

== Track listing ==
=== U.S. CD version ===
1. "The Hurdy Gurdy Man" (Leitch) – 4:01
2. "Barking Dogs" – 7:31
3. "The Hurdy Gurdy Man (Jim Melly Remix)" (Leitch) – 5:32

=== U.S. 7" vinyl version ===
1. "The Hurdy Gurdy Man" (Leitch) – 3:56
2. "Barking Dogs" – 7:31

=== U.K. CD version ===
1. "The Hurdy Gurdy Man" (Leitch) – 4:01
2. "Barking Dogs" – 7:31
3. "The Hurdy Gurdy Man (Paul Leary Remix)" (Leitch) – 4:01

=== U.K. 12" vinyl version ===
==== Side 1 ====
1. "The Hurdy Gurdy Man" (Leitch) – 4:01

==== Side 2 ====
1. "The Hurdy Gurdy Man (Paul Leary Remix)" (Leitch) – 4:01
2. "Barking Dogs" – 7:31

== Personnel ==
- Paul Leary – guitar, lead vocals
- Jeff Pinkus – bass
- King Coffey – drums
- Gibby Haynes – vocals and tronix
