= Humpty Dumpty LSD =

Compilation album by Butthole Surfers
- Released: July 11, 2002
- Recorded: 1982–1994
- Length: 69:11 (CD version)
- Label: Latino Buggerveil

Butthole Surfers chronology
Weird Revolution (2001)	Humpty Dumpty LSD (2002)	Butthole Surfers/Live PCPPEP (2003)

Professional ratings
Review scores
Source	Rating
AllMusic	3/5 stars
Rolling Stone	2/5 stars

Humpty Dumpty LSD is the second compilation album by American experimental rock band Butthole Surfers, released in July 2002. All songs were written by Butthole Surfers, except for "Earthquake," which is a cover version of the 13th Floor Elevators song.

The album was released on the band's own label, Latino Buggerveil. It offers a wide assortment of demos, unreleased studio tracks and songs originally released on compilations, recorded between 1982 and 1994. Most notably, it contains outtakes from the 1985 sessions for Butthole Surfers' Rembrandt Pussyhorse studio album. Some tracks are unfinished songs; for example, "Day of the Dying Alive" was later reworked as "Jimi," while the vinyl-only song "Sherman" is an alternative version of "Backass," both of which are on Hairway to Steven.

The bonus track, which lasts for only six seconds, is the band's shortest song to date. "Ghandi" first appeared as a bonus track on Independent Worm Saloon.

== Track listing ==
1. "Night of the Day" – 2:20 ^{1}
2. "One Hundred Million People Dead" (a.k.a. "100 Million People Dead") – 7:22 ^{2}
3. "I Love You Peggy" – 3:25 ^{3}
4. "Space I" – 5:48 ^{2}
5. "Perry Intro" – 1:36 ^{3}
6. "Day of the Dying Alive" – 5:46 ^{2}
7. "Eindhoven Chicken Masque" – 2:52 ^{3}
8. "Just a Boy" – 4:02 ^{4}
9. "Sinister Crayon" – 4:00 (2-LP version only)
10. "Hetero Skeleton" – 4:58 ^{3}
11. "Earthquake" (Roky Erickson/Tommy Hall) – 4:55 ^{5}
12. "Ghandi" – 2:28 ^{6}
13. "I Hate My Job" – 2:04 ^{4}
14. "Space II" – 5:11 ^{2}
15. "Concubine Solo" – 1:46 ^{1}
16. "All Day" – 8:32 ^{2} (featuring Daniel Johnston on guest vocals)
17. "Sherman" – 6:10 (2-LP version only)
18. "DADGAD" – 6:00 ^{7}
19. (untitled bonus track) – 0:06

^{1} 4-track recording, 1983
^{2} Home 8-track recording, 1987
^{3} Studio recording, 1985 (Rembrandt Pussyhorse sessions)
^{4} Studio recording, 1982 (Butthole Surfers sessions)
^{5} Studio recording, 1988 (Hairway to Steven sessions)
^{6} Practice space recording, 1992
^{7} Practice space recording, 1994

== Personnel ==
- Gibby Haynes
- Paul Leary
- Quinn Matthews
- Bill Jolly
- Jeff Pinkus
- Scott Matthews
- King Coffey
- Teresa Nervosa
