= Live PCPPEP =

Live album by Butthole Surfers
- Released: September 20, 1984
- Recorded: March 25, 1984
- Venue: San Antonio, Texas
- Genre: Punk rock
- Length: 21:18
- Label: Alternative Tentacles
- Producer: Butthole Surfers, Mike Taylor

Butthole Surfers chronology
Butthole Surfers (1983)	Live PCPPEP (1984)	Psychic... Powerless... Another Man's Sac (1984)

Professional ratings
Review scores
Source	Rating
AllMusic	3/5 stars
Robert Christgau	(B)
Sounds	3¾/5

Live PCPPEP is a live EP and first official live album by American punk band Butthole Surfers, released in September 1984. All songs were written by the Butthole Surfers, and recorded live at The Meridian in San Antonio, Texas, on March 25, 1984.

This was the Surfers' final album on Alternative Tentacles. Live PCPPEP and 1983's Butthole Surfers were reissued as the Butthole Surfers/Live PCPPEP CD on Latino Buggerveil in 2003. The Latino Buggerveil re-release also contains two additional live songs from the Meridian show, "Gary Floyd" and "Matchstick."

Live PCPPEP is the first of three Surfers albums to feature clown imagery on the cover, the others being 1987's Locust Abortion Technician and 1995's The Hole Truth... and Nothing Butt. The clown illustrations on its front and back covers were later combined and recolored for The Hole Truth...'s front cover. In a bit of a rarity for the band, the back cover includes the album's track listing.

== Background ==
Psychic..., the Surfers' first full-length album, was already complete by the time Live PCPPEP came out. Various band members have stated that they were unhappy with this recording's sound quality, but claim they had a financial need to release an album after Psychic...'s debut was unexpectedly delayed. (It was finally released three months later.) With the concert already recorded, and Alternative Tentacles interested in publishing it, the band authorized its release.

The album was recorded and assembled by Mike Taylor, a sound engineer at San Antonio, Texas' BOSS Studios, where the Surfers had recorded 1983's Butthole Surfers.

Though the size of the LP suggested a 33 rpm playback speed, it is played at 45 rpm. It was labeled 69 rpm.

== Music ==
The Surfers' first official live recording primarily contains performances of songs from the band's 1983 debut EP, Butthole Surfers (a.k.a. Brown Reason to Live, a.k.a. Pee Pee the Sailor), leading some fans and critics to joke that they released the same album twice. This isn't strictly the case, as Live PCPPEP also has one track from the then-upcoming album, Psychic... Powerless... Another Man's Sac ("Cowboy Bob"), as well as another that's technically never been released on a Surfers studio album ("Dance of the Cobras", a tape experiment made out of a recording of "Woly Boly").

This was the last Surfers album on which Gibby Haynes and guitarist Paul Leary would equally split lead vocal duties, with Haynes singing most, if not all, of the songs on later releases. This album also marked the debut of the first female Surfer, Teresa Nervosa, who was one of the band's two drummers (the other being King Coffey). With her arrival, the band's core classic lineup – Haynes, Leary, Coffey, and Nervosa – was set. With the exception of a number of different bass players, it remained largely unchanged until Nervosa's final departure in 1989.

== Track listing ==
All songs written by the Butthole Surfers.

=== Side 1 ===
1. "Cowboy Bob" – 2:32
2. "Bar-B-Q Pope" – 3:09
3. "Dance of the Cobras" – 0:34
4. "The Shah Sleeps in Lee Harvey's Grave" – 2:26

=== Side 2 ===
1. "Wichita Cathedral" – 2:45
2. "Hey" – 2:17
3. "Something" – 7:38

== Personnel ==
- Gibby Haynes – lead vocals ("Cowboy Bob," "Wichita Cathedral," and "Hey"), saxophone
- Paul Leary – guitar, lead vocals ("The Shah Sleeps in Lee Harvey's Grave," "Something," and "Bar-B-Q Pope")
- Bill Jolly – bass
- King Coffey – drums
- Teresa Nervosa – drums
