= Butthole Surfers/Live PCPPEP =

Compilation album by Butthole Surfers
- Released: January 28, 2003
- Recorded: 1982–1984
- Genre: Avant-garde; hardcore punk; neo-psychedelia
- Length: 54:12
- Label: Latino Buggerveil

Butthole Surfers chronology
Humpty Dumpty LSD (2002)	Butthole Surfers/Live PCPPEP (2003)	Live at the Leatherfly (2025)

Professional ratings
Review scores
Source	Rating
AllMusic	3/5 stars

Butthole Surfers/Live PCPPEP is the third compilation album by American punk band Butthole Surfers, released on January 28, 2003. All songs were written by Butthole Surfers.

This compilation contains the entirety of the band's first studio EP, Butthole Surfers, and its first live EP, Live PCPPEP, neither of which had previously been available in CD format. The live songs were recorded at The Meridian in San Antonio, Texas on March 25, 1984. Both releases were originally published by Alternative Tentacles. Vinyl records of Butthole Surfers are still available from that label, under the name Brown Reason to Live.

The album also contains four bonus tracks (15–18). Two of them, "Gary Floyd" and "Matchstick," are live songs from the Live PCPPEP concert. The third bonus track, "Sinister Crayon," was previously only available on the double-LP version of the compilation Humpty Dumpty LSD. "Something" is an early demo, which was also released on the compilation The Hole Truth... and Nothing Butt.

The CD's label features a reproduction of the "Pee Pee the Sailor" cartoon that had appeared on Alternative Tentacles' vinyl printings of Butthole Surfers. It also reprints that record's erroneous suggestion that listeners play the disc at "69 RPM," a joke referencing the famous sex position.

== Track listing ==
All songs written by Butthole Surfers.

1. "The Shah Sleeps in Lee Harvey's Grave" – 2:09 ^{1}
2. "Hey" – 2:06 ^{1}
3. "Something" – 4:36 ^{1}
4. "Bar-B-Q Pope" – 3:36 ^{1}
5. "Wichita Cathedral" – 2:22 ^{1}
6. "Suicide" – 1:24 ^{1}
7. "The Revenge of Anus Presley" – 2:25 ^{1}
8. "Cowboy Bob" – 2:32 ^{2}
9. "Bar-B-Q Pope" – 3:09 ^{2}
10. "Dance of the Cobras" – 0:34 ^{2}
11. "The Shah Sleeps in Lee Harvey's Grave" – 2:26 ^{2}
12. "Wichita Cathedral" – 2:45 ^{2}
13. "Hey" – 2:17 ^{2}
14. "Something" – 7:38 ^{2}
15. "Gary Floyd" – 2:02 ^{3}
16. "Matchstick" – 3:09 ^{3}
17. "Sinister Crayon" – 4:01 ^{4}
18. "Something" – 5:03 ^{5}

^{1} From 1983's Butthole Surfers
^{2} From 1984's Live PCPPEP, recorded live at San Antonio, Texas' The Meridian on March 25, 1984
^{3} Previously unreleased recordings from the Meridian show
^{4} Bonus track
^{5} Demo

== Personnel ==
- Gibby Haynes – lead vocals (Tracks 2, 5–8, 12–13, 15–17), saxophone
- Paul Leary – guitar, lead vocals (Tracks 1, 3–4, 9, 11, 14, 18)
- Bill Jolly – bass (Tracks 1–16, 18, 17?)
- King Coffey – drums (Tracks 4–5, 8–17)
- Scott Matthews – drums (Tracks 1–3, 6–7, 18)
- Teresa Nervosa – drums (Tracks 8–16, 17?)
