= Bar-B-Que Movie =

- Directed by: Tom Stern; Alex Winter
- Written by: Tom Stern; Alex Winter
- Starring: Alex Winter
- Release date: 1988
- Language: English

Bar-B-Que Movie is an 11-minute Super 8 film created in 1988, written and directed by Tom Stern and actor/filmmaker Alex Winter. It is a spoof of 1974's The Texas Chain Saw Massacre, and stars American punk band Butthole Surfers. Featured Surfers include Gibby Haynes, Paul Leary, King Coffey, Teresa Nervosa, and Jeff Pinkus, as well as the band's dancer, Kathleen Lynch.

== Premise ==
In this twisted spoof of The Texas Chain Saw Massacre, a vacationing family (the father of which, Jerry, is played by actor John Hawkes, of later Deadwood fame) is waylaid by a communal group of cannibalistic misfits, played by the Butthole Surfers. The mother and Jerry are tricked into consuming hallucinogenic beverages, while their son, Jerry Jr., is murdered. A short time later, Jerry Jr.'s meat is served as dinner.

After eating, Jerry runs off to find his son, but instead finds the Butthole Surfers, who are doing a live performance of the song "Fast" (a.k.a. "Fart Song"). Though staged, the segment presents a fairly accurate reproduction of the band's then-legendary live concerts. The movie also contains excerpts from several other Butthole Surfers songs: "Concubine", "Weber" "Graveyard" and a different version of "Fast". The movie ends with Jerry waking up in a fenced area along with his wife - she tells him to eat his breakfast, which is the remains of Jerry Jr.

== Cast ==
- John Hawkes as Jerry
- King Coffey as himself
- Gibby Haynes as himself
- Paul Leary as himself
- Kathleen Lynch as herself
- Jeff Pinkus as himself
- Teresa Taylor as herself
- Randy Turner as Drunk Homeless Guy
- Alex Winter as Mexican Hitchhiker
