= The Hole Truth... and Nothing Butt =

Compilation album by Butthole Surfers
- Released: March 28, 1995
- Recorded: 1983–1993
- Genre: Avant-garde; hardcore punk; neo-psychedelia; noise rock
- Length: 72:00
- Label: Trance Syndicate

Butthole Surfers chronology
Independent Worm Saloon (1993)	The Hole Truth... and Nothing Butt (1995)	Electriclarryland (1996)

Professional ratings
Review scores
Source	Rating
Allmusic	2.5/5 stars
Rolling Stone	3/5 stars

The Hole Truth... and Nothing Butt is the first compilation album by American punk band Butthole Surfers, officially released in March 1995. All songs were written by Butthole Surfers, except for "Come Together" and "Hurdy Gurdy Man".

The album was originally released on CD in 1994 by bootleg label Totonka Records. A collection of previously un-bootlegged material put together by a fan, it offers a mix of studio demos and live recordings, as well as a portion of a radio interview. The band liked the compilation enough that they reissued it through Trance Syndicate in 1995, also packaging a Butthole Surfers sticker along with it.

The two demos, "Butthole Surfer" and "Something," were recorded in 1983. Of the live tracks, four were taped in 1985, three in 1986, two in 1988, one each in 1989 and 1991, and three in 1993.

The interview was taped at New York, NY station WNYU on July 28, 1987. All members from that time period are present, including Gibby Haynes, Paul Leary, King Coffey, Teresa Nervosa, and Jeff Pinkus.

The Hole Truth... and Nothing Butt is the third of three Butthole Surfers albums to feature clown imagery on the cover, the others being 1984's Live PCPPEP and 1987's Locust Abortion Technician. The clown illustrations on this album's front cover are combined and re-colored versions of the line drawings on Live PCPPEP's front and back covers.

== Track listing ==
All songs written by Butthole Surfers, except for "Come Together" and "Hurdy Gurdy Man". The song titles listed below match those used on the back cover of The Hole Truth... and Nothing Butt. Some differ from the official titles used on Butthole Surfers' studio albums.

1. "Butthole Surfer" – 3:10 ^{1}
2. "Something" – 5:00 ^{1}
3. "Moving to Florida" – 4:02 ^{2}
4. "Hurdy Gurdy Man" – 2:43 ^{2}
5. "Come Together" – 0:52 ^{2}
6. "Cherub" – 6:08 ^{2}
7. "Graveyard" – 3:03 ^{3}
8. "USSA" (a.k.a. "U.S.S.A.") – 4:46 ^{3}
9. "Lady Sniff" – 3:32 ^{3}
10. "John E. Smoke" – 7:09 ^{4}
11. "1401" (a.k.a. "The Colored F.B.I. Guy") – 2:43 ^{4}
12. "Psychedelic" (a.k.a. "P.S.Y." and "Psychedelic Jam") – 9:57 ^{5}
13. "Bon Song" (a.k.a. "Bong Song") – 3:15 ^{6}
14. "The Wooden Song" – 3:32 ^{7}
15. "Pittsburgh to Lebanon" – 3:26 ^{7}
16. "The Shah Sleeps in Lee Harvey's Grave" – 6:09 ^{7}
17. "WNYU Interview" – 5:28 ^{8}

^{1} 1983 demo
^{2} Live at San Antonio, TX's The Cameo Club, September 21, 1985
^{3} Live at San Francisco, CA's Mabuhay Gardens, January 18, 1986
^{4} Live at San Francisco, CA's The I-Beam, October 24, 1988
^{5} Live at Phoenix, AZ's The Underground, February 4, 1989
^{6} Live at Lollopalooza in Irvine, CA, July 23, 1991
^{7} Live at Castaic Lake, CA, July 23, 1993
^{8} Live interview with New York radio station WNYU, July 28, 1987

== Personnel ==
- Gibby Haynes – lead vocals, saxophone
- Paul Leary – guitar, lead vocals (tracks 2, 4 and 16)
- Quinn Matthews – bass (tracks 1 & 2)
- Juan Molina – bass (tracks 3–6)
- Jeff Pinkus – bass (tracks 7–16)
- Scott Matthews – drums (tracks 1 & 2)
- King Coffey – drums (tracks 3–16)
- Teresa Nervosa – drums (tracks 3–6, 10–12)
- Cabbage – drums (tracks 7–9)
