= Locust Abortion Technician =

Studio album by Butthole Surfers
- Released: March 1987 (US); 1987 (Europe and Australia)
- Recorded: 1986
- Studios: Home Studio in Winterville, Georgia
- Genres: Noise rock; punk rock; psychedelic rock; experimental rock; avant garde; alternative rock
- Length: 32:34
- Labels: Touch and Go (original US release); Latino Buggerveil (1999 US reissue); Blast First (UK); Au Go Go (Australia)
- Producer: Butthole Surfers

Butthole Surfers chronology
Blind Eye Sees All (1986)	Locust Abortion Technician (1987)	Hairway to Steven (1988)

Locust Abortion Technician is the third studio album by American rock band Butthole Surfers, released in March 1987. The album was originally released on both vinyl and CD on Touch and Go, and was remastered on CD on the band's label, Latino Buggerveil, in 1999.

== Background ==
Locust Abortion Technician was the first Butthole Surfers album to not be recorded in a professional studio. After growing tired of living on the road, the band relocated to Winterville sometime in 1986, where they rented a small two-bedroom house, and used their meager savings to purchase an old Ampex 8-track tape machine and two microphones. Having set up a temporary home studio, the band set off to record what would become their third full-length LP. Despite the band downgrading from the equipment used on their previous record, guitarist Paul Leary believes that the inferior equipment forced the band to be more creative than they might otherwise have been.

Additionally, the new studio freed the band from having to worry about recording costs, allowing them to experiment even more than on previous releases. Jeff Pinkus has also said that the home studio gave them the luxury of taking extended breaks for drug use.

Many of the album's tracks also underwent extensive in-studio development. Although doing this had become a Butthole Surfers tradition, Locust Abortion Technician was one of their last recordings done in such a manner; on subsequent releases the band would go into the studio with more fully formed songs. Pinkus has expressed the opinion that the earlier, more chaotic recording sessions resulted in much of the spontaneous creativity that had propelled the group's early albums.

== Music ==
Audio sample of "Human Cannonball"

Locust Abortion Technician is an experimental blend of punk rock, heavy metal, and psychedelic music. This fusion led the band to be associated with the emerging grunge and sludge metal sounds. It also employs elements of worldbeat rhythms, noise music, progressive guitar, and folk music, and has been described as art rock, noise rock and alternative metal. The song "Sweat Loaf" utilizes a warped riff parodying the verse riff from the Black Sabbath song "Sweet Leaf". Not all the tracks are guitar-oriented, though; the song "Kuntz" was created by processing the song "Klua Duang" ("The Fear") by Thai artists Phloen Phromdaen and Kong Katkamngae through Gibby Haynes' "Gibbytronix" effects system. The song "22 Going On 23" features a woman's account of sexual assault made to a radio call-in show. Leary, who recorded the radio show, assumed it was a prank but found it harrowing nonetheless.

This album marked the debut of bass player Jeff Pinkus, as well as the return of co-drummer Teresa Nervosa, who had left the band in December 1985. It was also the first Surfers full-length album to feature lead singer Gibby Haynes' Gibbytronix vocal effects, which feature on the songs "Sweat Loaf" and "Human Cannonball" (although Gibbytronix were employed on "Comb" on the Cream Corn from the Socket of Davis EP a year earlier).

The Butthole Surfers regularly play songs from Locust Abortion Technician during their live concerts, including "Sweat Loaf", "Graveyard", "Pittsburgh to Lebanon", "U.S.S.A.", "Kuntz", and "22 Going on 23".

=== Notes ===
- "Sweat Loaf" is a take on the Black Sabbath song "Sweet Leaf".
- "HAY" is a different mix of the "22 Going on 23" recording, played backwards at double speed. What sounds like voices saying "Hey!" in the song are, in fact, field recordings the band made of cows mooing outside a nearby slaughterhouse, also backwards at double speed. In the final part, there is something that seems to be a high-pitched voice speaking gibberish. This is the speech from the beginning of "22 Going on 23," including the repeated words.
- "22 Going on 23" brought the band to wider UK attention when it was voted number 44 in John Peel's 1987 Festive Fifty.
- "The O-Men" is a spoof on the speed metal band Omen, inspired by and lifting its chorus from their song "Termination". The vocal style and name of the song are also a reference to the Seattle post-punk band The U-Men, whom the band befriended when The U-Men were on tour and got stuck in Texas for a month.

== Artwork ==
Locust Abortion Technician's front cover illustration of two clowns playing with a dog, entitled "Fido and the Clowns," was painted by Arthur Sarnoff.

== Reception and legacy ==
Professional ratings
Review scores
Source	Rating
AllMusic	4.5/5 stars
The Encyclopedia of Popular Music	3/5 stars
The Great Rock Discography	8/10
MusicHound Rock	4/5 stars
OndaRock	8/10
The Rolling Stone Album Guide	4/5 stars
Spin Alternative Record Guide	8/10
Uncut	5/5 stars

The album received critical acclaim upon initial release, appearing in the year-end lists of noteworthy publications such as Melody Maker, NME and OOR. It would go on to feature in Robert Dimery's 1001 Albums You Must Hear Before You Die and Terrorizer's "The 100 Most Important Albums of the 80s", while Alternative Press ranked it at No. 28 on their list of the "Top 99 Albums of '85 to '95".

In his retrospective review of the album, Steve Huey, writing for AllMusic, said, “The aural equivalent of a nightmarish acid trip and arguably the band's best album (or worst, depending on your point of view), Locust Abortion Technician tops the psychedelic, artsy sonic experimentation of Rembrandt Pussyhorse while keeping one foot planted firmly in the gutter. The record veers from heavy Sabbath sludge (even parodying that band on "Sweat Loaf") to grungy noise rock to progressive guitar and tape effects to almost folky numbers in one big, gloriously schizophrenic mess.”

In 2018, Pitchfork included the album on their list of "The 200 Best Albums of the 1980s", adding, “From the John Wayne Gacy-indebted cover art to the turbid sounds within, the group's third LP took a chainsaw to hardcore, psychedelic rock, country blues, Black Sabbath, and, on closer “22 Going on 23,” the sound of mooing cows and the agonizing confession of a sexual assault victim. Butchering every notion of good taste in their path, the Butthole Surfers revelled in the most cartoonish and nightmarish aspects of reality without regret.”

Kurt Cobain listed the album in his top 50 albums of all time along with the Butthole Surfers’ first record. Doug Martsch included the album among the 10 records that shaped the music of his band Built to Spill.

=== Samples, covers and tributes ===
- "Sweat Loaf" is referenced in Red Hot Chili Peppers' song "Deep Kick" from their album One Hot Minute.
- The opening of "Sweat Loaf" was sampled by Orbital on their track "Satan".
- "Sweat Loaf" was sampled by Kid Rock on his track "Pancake Breakfast" from the album The Polyfuze Method.
- Melvins covered the track "Graveyard" on their 2018 album Pinkus Abortion Technician, whose title is itself a reference to both this album and bassist Jeff Pinkus (who plays on both).
- The song "Human Cannonball" was sampled in the final season of the television show Stranger Things. The character Mike Wheeler (played by Finn Wolfhard) tries to make a bomb out of a record, choosing this album before being convinced by Robin (played by Maya Hawke) to swap for an unnamed Replacements record.

== Track listing ==
Side A

All tracks are written by Gibby Haynes, Paul Leary, and King Coffey.

No.	Title	Writer(s)	Length
1.	"Sweat Loaf"	Haynes, Leary, Coffey, Jeff Pinkus	6:09
2.	"Graveyard"		2:27
3.	"Pittsburgh to Lebanon"		2:29
4.	"Weber"		0:35
5.	"HAY"		1:50
6.	"Human Cannonball"	Haynes, Leary, Coffey, Pinkus	3:51

Side B

No.	Title	Writer(s)	Length
1.	"U.S.S.A."		2:14
2.	"The O-Men"	Haynes, Leary, Coffey, Pinkus	3:27
3.	"Kuntz" (effects-processed version of "The Fear (กลัวดวง)", performed by Phloen Phromdaen [uncredited])	Kong Katkamngae	2:24
4.	"Graveyard"		2:45
5.	"22 Going on 23"		4:23

== Personnel ==
- Gibby Haynes – lead vocals
- Paul Leary – guitar
- Jeff Pinkus – bass
- King Coffey – drums
- Teresa Nervosa – drums

== Charts ==
Chart (1987)	Peak position
UK Indie Chart	3
