= Blind Eye Sees All =

Video by Butthole Surfers
- Released: June 1986
- Recorded: February 22 and March 3, 1985
- Genre: Avant-garde, hardcore punk, psychedelic rock
- Length: 1:06:00
- Label: Touch and Go Video

Butthole Surfers chronology
Rembrandt Pussyhorse (1986)	Blind Eye Sees All (1986)	Locust Abortion Technician (1987)

Professional ratings
Review scores
Source	Rating
Allmusic	link

Blind Eye Sees All is a concert video by Butthole Surfers, which was released on VHS tape in 1985 through Touch and Go Video. The package included a 5" clear vinyl single-sided record with a different mix of their cover of The Guess Who song "American Woman". The single bore no label, titles, or credits, and came packaged between the paper insert of the clamshell case and the plastic sleeve for holding cover artwork, in such a way that the disc itself can be seen as the cornea of the eye featured on the original artwork.

The video was re-released on DVD in 2002 by Music Video Distributors. The bulk of the video features performances from two concerts at Traxx in Detroit, MI in February and March 1985, woven between rambling interviews with the band relaxing in bed. Also included is footage from an early concert of the band with a fully nude Gibby Haynes.

== Track listing ==
1. "The Shah Sleeps in Lee Harvey's Grave"
2. "One Hundred Million People Dead"
3. "Bar-be-que Pope"
4. "Cowboy Bob"
5. "Hey"
6. "Tornados"
7. "Dum Dum"
8. "Mexican Caravan"
9. "Cherub"
10. "Lady Sniff"
11. "Something"
12. "Mark Says Alright"
13. "PSY"

== DVD Extras ==
- "Butthole Karaoke"
- Audio and Photo Gallery
- "Negro Observer" (Live in 1991)

== Personnel ==
- Gibby Haynes – vocals, saxophone, guitar on "The Shah Sleeps in Lee Harvey's Grave", "Mark Says Alright" and "PSY"; bass guitar on "Something"
- Paul Leary – lead guitar, vocals on "The Shah Sleeps in Lee Harvey's Grave", "Bar-be-que Pope" and "Something"; bass guitar on "The Shah Sleeps in Lee Harvey's Grave"
- King Coffey – drums
- Teresa Taylor – drums
- Trevor Malcolm – bass guitar, sousaphone on "Something"
