= Piouhgd =

piouhgd

Studio album by Butthole Surfers
- Released: February 20, 1991
- Genres: Avant-garde; noise rock; hardcore punk; neo-psychedelia
- Length: 51:39
- Labels: Rough Trade (original release); Capitol (1992 reissue); Latino Buggerveil (2007 reissue) Matador (2026 Reissue)

Butthole Surfers chronology
Hurdy Gurdy Man (1990)	piouhgd (1991)	Independent Worm Saloon (1993)

Singles from piouhgd
- 1. "The Hurdy Gurdy Man" Released: 1990; 2. "Lonesome Bulldog" Released: 1990

Professional ratings
Review scores
Source	Rating
AllMusic	2/5 stars
Robert Christgau	(1-star Honorable Mention)
Drowned in Sound	(2007 reissue) 8/10
The Encyclopedia of Popular Music	3/5 stars
Q	3/5 stars
Rolling Stone	2/5 stars

piouhgd is the fifth studio album by American alternative rock band Butthole Surfers, released in 1991 on Rough Trade Records. The album was reissued on Capitol Records in 1992, due to the album being out-of-print following the American branch of Rough Trade closing its doors the previous year. Capitol had bought the rights to the album after its initial release, in order to lure the Butthole Surfers away from other labels. The album was reissued yet again in October 2007 by Butthole Surfers' own label, Latino Buggerveil, and included the four songs from their 1989 EP Widowermaker as bonus tracks.

== Title confusion ==
Rough Trade press releases stated that the album was pronounced "pee-owed" (as in "P.O.'ed", a euphemization of "pissed off") and that it meant "I told you" in the Navajo language. Bassist Jeff Pinkus stated that this explanation was fabricated by the label unbeknownst to the band, and that the album title was created with the intention of it being unpronounceable.

The album is spelled as "piouhgd" on original Rough Trade releases. On the 1992 Capitol Records reissue, the album title is printed on the spine as "pioughd". However, the original "piouhgd" spelling is still used on the back cover art of the Capitol release. The album has been referred to under both titles, as well as various misspellings.

== Track listing ==
All tracks are written by Gibby Haynes, Paul Leary, Jeff Pinkus, and King Coffey.

No.	Title	Lyrics	Music	Length
1.	"Revolution Part 1"			2:18
2.	"Revolution Part 2"			7:28
3.	"Lonesome Bulldog"			4:42
4.	"Lonesome Bulldog II"			0:39
5.	"The Hurdy Gurdy Man"	Donovan	Donovan	3:59
6.	"Golden Showers"			3:17
7.	"Lonesome Bulldog III"			0:37
8.	"Blindman"			3:40
9.	"No, I'm Iron Man"			2:25
10.	"Something"	Haynes, Leary	William Reid, Jim Reid	2:06
11.	"P.S.Y."			12:12
12.	"Lonesome Bulldog IV"			0:41

=== CD bonus track ===
No.	Title	Length
13.	"Barking Dogs"	7:28
Total length:		51:39

=== 2007 CD reissue bonus tracks ===
No.	Title	Length
14.	"Helicopter"	6:47
15.	"Bong Song"	3:40
16.	"The Colored FBI Guy"	2:46
17.	"Booze, Tobacco, Dope, Pussy, Cars"	2:19
Total length:		67:11

- Tracks 14–17 from the Widowermaker EP.
- "The Hurdy Gurdy Man" is a cover of the 1968 Donovan song "Hurdy Gurdy Man".
- "Something" sets the lyrics of the band's early 80's original song of the same name to the music and arrangement of the Jesus and Mary Chain's "Never Understand."

== Personnel ==
- Gibby Haynes – vocals, guitar
- Paul Leary – guitar, keyboard, vocals (Tracks 3, 5, 10, & 13)
- Jeff Pinkus – bass
- King Coffey – drums
