= Independent Worm Saloon =

Studio album by Butthole Surfers
- Released: March 23, 1993
- Genres: Alternative rock, alternative metal, hard rock
- Length: 62:22
- Label: Capitol
- Producers: John Paul Jones, Butthole Surfers

Butthole Surfers chronology
piouhgd (1991)	Independent Worm Saloon (1993)	The Hole Truth... and Nothing Butt (1995)

Singles from Independent Worm Saloon
- 1. "Who Was in My Room Last Night?" Released: 1993; 2. "Dust Devil" Released: 1993; 3. "You Don't Know Me" Released: 1993 (Promotional single); 4. "The Wooden Song" Released: 1993 (Promotional single)

Professional ratings
Review scores
Source	Rating
AllMusic	3/5 stars
Chicago Tribune	3/4 stars
Robert Christgau	A−
Entertainment Weekly	B
Los Angeles Times	3/4 stars
The New York Times	(favorable)
(The New) Rolling Stone Album Guide	3/5 stars
Select	4/5 medals

Independent Worm Saloon is the sixth album by alternative rock band Butthole Surfers, released in 1993 on Capitol Records. The band chose to follow a heavier orientation for most of the record, following the hiring of producer John Paul Jones, formerly of Led Zeppelin. The album is the band's final release with longtime bassist Jeff Pinkus.

== Track listing ==
All tracks are written by Butthole Surfers (Gibby Haynes, Paul Leary, Jeff Pinkus, and King Coffey).

No.	Title	Length
1.	"Who Was in My Room Last Night?"	4:09
2.	"The Wooden Song"	3:50
3.	"Tongue"	2:06
4.	"Chewin' George Lucas' Chocolate"	0:43
5.	"Goofy's Concern"	3:03
6.	"Alcohol"	3:19
7.	"Dog Inside Your Body"	3:06
8.	"Strawberry"	4:08
9.	"Some Dispute Over T-Shirt Sales"	2:06
10.	"Dancing Fool"	2:59
11.	"You Don't Know Me"	2:41
12.	"The Annoying Song"	2:40
13.	"Dust Devil"	6:39
14.	"Leave Me Alone"	2:25
15.	"Edgar"	3:34
16.	"The Ballad of Naked Man"	6:05
17.	"Clean It Up"	8:39
Total length:		62:22

=== Japanese CD reissue bonus tracks ===
No.	Title	Length
18.	"Beat the Press"	1:25
19.	"Ghandi"	2:31
20.	"Neee Neee"	4:31
Total length:		70:50

These three bonus tracks were also included on a 10" vinyl promotional release sent to college radio stations. "Ghandi" was later included on Humpty Dumpty LSD.

== Personnel ==
Butthole Surfers

- Gibby Haynes – vocals, guitar
- Paul Leary – guitar, vocals (track 10), spoken word (track 4), "art master"
- Jeff Pinkus – bass, vocals & banjo (track 16)
- King Coffey – drums

Additional personnel

- John Paul Jones – producer, bass (track 16)
- Pat McCarthy – engineer, mixer
- Helios Creed – guitar (tracks 12 & 17)
- Heather Van Haaften – "art slave"

== Charts ==
Album - Billboard (United States)

Year	Chart	Position
1993	The Billboard 200	154
1993	Heatseekers	6

Singles - Billboard (United States)

Year	Single	Chart	Position
1993	"Who Was in My Room Last Night?"	Modern Rock Tracks	24

== Notes ==
- The song "Strawberry" ends with an extended sample of Bible Reading In Cherokee By Indian from Sound Effects, Vol. 5 by Audio Fidelity Records. The same sample can be heard in Manowar's Spirit Horse of the Cherokee.
