= Hairway to Steven =

Studio album by Butthole Surfers
- Released: April 11, 1988 (US); 1988 (UK) (Australia)
- Recorded: January 1988; Dallas, Texas
- Length: 41:22
- Labels: Touch and Go (original release); Latino Buggerveil (1999 reissue); Blast First (UK); Au Go Go (Australia)
- Producer: Butthole Surfers

Butthole Surfers chronology
Locust Abortion Technician (1987)	Hairway to Steven (1988)	Double Live (1989)

Professional ratings
Review scores
Source	Rating
AllMusic	4.5/5 stars
Rolling Stone	4/5 stars

Hairway to Steven is the fourth studio album by American experimental rock band Butthole Surfers, released in April 1988. All songs were written by Butthole Surfers, co-produced by Butthole Surfers and Ric Wallace, and mixed by Wallace. The album was recorded at January Sound Studio in Dallas.

The album was originally released on Touch and Go, and was reissued on Latino Buggerveil in 1999. Some of its tracks make allusions to famous musicians, such as Julio Iglesias.

The album's name is a Spoonerism of Led Zeppelin's signature song, "Stairway to Heaven".

== Music ==
The last full-length Butthole Surfers studio album of the 1980s—and the last on indie label Touch and Go—marked a midway point in the band's career, straddling their psychedelic-noise roots and the more accessible recordings that followed it. Like Butthole Surfers' previous releases, Hairway to Steven uses nontraditional instrumentation, extensive tape editing, and sound modulation. Unlike its predecessors, which relied almost exclusively on a foundation of electric guitar, bass, and dual drummers, it makes equally heavy use of the acoustic guitar.

This was drummer Teresa Nervosa's final studio recording with Butthole Surfers.

Live performances of all of the album's songs, with the exception of "Julio Iglesias", were included on 1989's Double Live. "Rocky" and "Fast" continue to be regular features of their concerts.

== Song titles ==
This album used no actual song titles when originally released; each song was represented by an absurdist, often scatological cartoon printed on the vinyl record's label and in the CD's packaging. In the years since, fans have extrapolated the songs' actual names by cross-referencing this album with official and bootleg recordings of the Surfers' live performances, particularly 1989's Double Live. Many online music services use these widely accepted titles (see "Track listing").

== Background ==
Hairway to Steven was recorded at one studio in a relatively short period of time. According to bassist Jeff Pinkus, the band had been performing most of these songs for years before recording them for this album. Many of the band's previous releases had been piecemeal affairs, recorded over several months in numerous studios, and their songs underwent far more in-studio development.

Butthole Surfers opted to follow this album's blueprint on future recordings, entering the studio with more fully formed songs than they had in the past. Pinkus has expressed the opinion that these better-organized recording sessions stifled much of the spontaneous creativity that had propelled the group's previous albums.

== Track listing ==
All songs written and co-produced by Gibby Haynes, Paul Leary, Jeff Pinkus and King Coffey. The following titles were extrapolated by matching the songs to those found on 1989's Double Live, with the exception of "Julio Iglesias", which is inferred from the song's oft-repeated mention of the singer's name. Searching in the ASCAP Repertory database website shows that all of them match, except 4 as "John E. Smokes."

=== Side 1 ===
No.	Title	Length
1.	"Jimi"	12:38
2.	"Ricky"	2:36
3.	"I Saw an X-Ray of a Girl Passing Gas"	4:56

=== Side 2 ===
No.	Title	Length
4.	"John E. Smoke"	6:40
5.	"Rocky"	3:45
6.	"Julio Iglesias"	3:05
7.	"Backass"	6:07
8.	"Fast"	1:35

== Personnel ==
- Gibby Haynes – lead vocals
- Paul Leary – guitar
- Jeff Pinkus – bass
- King Coffey – drums
- Teresa Nervosa – drums

== Charts ==
Chart (1988)	Peak position
UK Indie Chart	6
