= The Hugh Beaumont Experience =

- Origin: Fort Worth, Texas, United States
- Genres: Punk rock, hardcore punk
- Years active: 1980–1983
- Label: Existential Vacuum

The Hugh Beaumont Experience was a punk rock band from Fort Worth, Texas. The band's original lineup was Brad Stiles on vocals, Tommie Duncan on guitar, Clay Carlisle on bass, and Carter Kolba on drums. Formed in 1980 by members of the private school, Fort Worth Country Day School, in Fort Worth, they toured throughout Texas in 1981–82, including dates with MDC and The Dead Kennedys. Their nascent success was short-lived, however; the band had broken up by 1983, having released just one 7-inch called Cone Johnson EP (now a collector's item) and a cassette called Virgin Killers. (This material was re-released in 1993 on Existential Vacuum Records; They also did a recording session with Bob Mould of Hüsker Dü.)

Formed while the members were all under the drinking age (then 18 years, in Texas), the band initially had some difficulty securing gigs, and often played small local arcades and other places that would ignore ages, such as DJs in Dallas. Despite only existing for three years, the band went through numerous lineup changes, with a corresponding diversity of styles; their earlier work is Sex Pistols-indebted punk (complete with British-accented vocals), their middle work is more hardcore / thrash influenced, and their later style flirts with psychedelic rock and experimental rock techniques.

Drummer King Coffey was in the band at one point before going on to join the Butthole Surfers. The Hugh Beaumont Experience's notoriety increased significantly when the Surfers became a widely known alternative rock group.
