= Stuff (film) =

1993 Johnny Depp and Gibby Haynes film

- Directed by: Johnny Depp; Gibby Haynes
- Written by: Daniel P. Depp; Johnny Depp
- Produced by: Daniel P. Depp
- Starring: John Frusciante; Timothy Leary
- Cinematography: Bruce Alan Greene
- Edited by: Kimberly Logan
- Music by: John Frusciante
- Release date: 1993
- Running time: 12 minutes
- Language: English

Stuff is a 12-minute documentary about the house of Red Hot Chili Peppers guitarist John Frusciante. It was made in 1993 by Johnny Depp and Gibby Haynes, the lead singer of the Butthole Surfers. Dr. Timothy Leary is also present in the video. The film's main purpose was to depict the chaos and instability of Frusciante's life.

The film once aired in the Dutch TV series Lola Da Musica, and was released in the 1990s as a promo VHS. "Untitled #2" from Frusciante's Niandra Lades and Usually Just a T-Shirt album is featured in the film with a poem read over it. Also featured is an unreleased Frusciante song, which contains elements of another song titled "Untitled #5" from his album Niandra LaDes and Usually Just a T-Shirt.

== Soundtrack ==
All songs written by John Frusciante unless noted otherwise:

1. Title unknown (unreleased Niandra-era recording) – 1:14
2. "Running Away Into You" – 1:52
3. "Untitled #2" (With poem) – 4:18
4. "Untitled #3" – 1:48
5. "Hallelujah" (Leonard Cohen) (Performed by John Cale) – 2:16
