= Arthur Sarnoff =

American artist and illustrator

- Born: Arthur Saron Sarnoff; 1912; Brooklyn, New York, US
- Died: 2000 (aged 87–88); Boca Raton, Florida, US
- Known for: Illustration

Arthur Sarnoff (1912 – 2000) was an American artist and illustrator.

Sarnoff was born in Brooklyn, New York, in 1912. He studied at the Industrial School and the Grand Central School of Art in New York City. He was a member of the Society of Illustrators and exhibited widely including the National Academy of Design.

Sarnoff was a student of John Clymer and Andrew Wyeth. His portfolio includes extensive commercial work for weekly magazines and his art appeared in a variety of advertising campaigns including Karo Syrup, Dextrose, Lucky Strike, Coors, Camay, Sal Hepatica, Listerine, Vicks VapoRub, Meds, and Ipana. He also made an album cover for the American punk band Butthole Surfers for their third album, Locust Abortion Technician, which portrays two clowns playing with a dog. During his career Sarnoff provided illustrations for McCall's, American Weekly, Collier's, Woman's Home Companion, Redbook, The American Magazine, Cosmopolitan, Esquire, and Good Housekeeping.

His work was whimsical and engaging and relied heavily upon themes of Americana and slapstick humour. One of his paintings, "The Hustler", was one of the best-selling prints of the 1950s. He was also known to have painted portraits of famous individuals such as Bob Hope and John F. Kennedy.

Sarnoff usually signed art using his full name, or "Sarnoff", or just "AS."

His best known work is a painting of dogs playing pool entitled "Jack the Ripper".

Sarnoff married Lillian Skaff (1914–1977) and had two children, Susan & Linda, before divorcing. Lillian Sarnoff died in 1977.

In the 1960s Sarnoff married his second wife, Muriel Zapoleon (d. 1994) with whom he had no children.

He died in 2000 in Boca Raton, Florida.
