= Psychic... Powerless... Another Man's Sac =

Studio album by Butthole Surfers
- Released: December 1984 (US); July 1985 (UK)
- Recorded: 1984
- Genres: Avant-garde; psychedelic rock; noise rock; hardcore punk
- Length: 35:04
- Labels: Touch and Go (US); Fundamental (UK); Latino Buggerveil (reissue)
- Producer: Butthole Surfers

Butthole Surfers chronology
Live PCPPEP (1984)	Psychic... Powerless... Another Man's Sac (1984)	Cream Corn from the Socket of Davis (1985)

Back cover

Alternative cover
- UK cover

Professional ratings
Review scores
Source	Rating
Allmusic	4/5 stars
The Encyclopedia of Popular Music	3/5 stars
Robert Christgau	B+
Rolling Stone	4/5 stars

Psychic... Powerless... Another Man's Sac is the debut studio album by American rock band Butthole Surfers, released in December 1984 by Touch and Go Records in America and Fundamental Records in England. It was preceded by the band's debut mini-album in 1983, Butthole Surfers. This was Butthole Surfers' first album on Touch and Go, and was originally released on clear vinyl. It was reissued on Latino Buggerveil in 1999.

== Background ==
According to guitarist Paul Leary, Psychic... was recorded in a very substandard studio. Leary also claims he and Haynes were living in a tool shed at the time of the sessions.

Butthole Surfers weren't under contract to any record label when they recorded this album. Upon its completion they offered it to Alternative Tentacles, who had released the band's first two EPs but could not afford to distribute the new project. This, combined with questions the group had regarding Alternative Tentacles' handling of royalties from the band’s self-titled debut and the Live PCPPEP, resulted in the album ultimately being released on Touch and Go. The album's back cover and label photos were produced by artist Michael Macioce.

Psychic... featured the studio debut of drummer Teresa Nervosa. The album was also the second and final studio release which featured bassist Bill Jolly. For the band's subsequent album and touring cycle, the role of bassist was in flux, with Terence Smart, Trevor Malcolm, and Juan Molina filling the role. The lineup eventually settled with the addition of Jeff Pinkus in 1986.

== Track listing ==
=== Side A ===
All tracks are written by Butthole Surfers (Gibby Haynes, Paul Leary, and King Coffey).

No.	Title	Length
1.	"Concubine"	2:27
2.	"Eye of the Chicken"	1:36
3.	"Dum Dum"	3:47
4.	"Woly Boly"	2:45
5.	"Negro Observer" (CD/LP versions only, omitted from 2024 Matador Records reissue)	3:39
6.	"Butthole Surfer"	3:02

=== Side B ===
No.	Title	Length
7.	"Lady Sniff"	3:45
8.	"Cherub"	6:22
9.	"Mexican Caravan"	2:46
10.	"Cowboy Bob"	2:55
11.	"Gary Floyd"	1:56
Total length:		35:04

=== UK CD bonus tracks ===
No.	Title	Length
1.	"Moving to Florida"	4:32
2.	"Comb"	4:57
3.	"To Parter"	4:20
4.	"Tornadoes"	2:36
Total length:		16:24 (51:31)

- Tracks 12–15 were taken from 1985’s Cream Corn from the Socket of Davis EP. In the US, these tracks appeared instead on the CD release of the Surfers’ 1986 album, Rembrandt Pussyhorse.

== Personnel ==
- Gibby Haynes – lead vocals, saxophone
- Paul Leary – guitar, vocals on "Mexican Caravan" and "Gary Floyd"
- Bill Jolly – bass
- King Coffey – drums
- Teresa Nervosa – drums

== Charts ==
Chart (1985)	Peak position
UK Indie Chart	12
