= Teresa Taylor =

American drummer (1962–2023)

Background information
- Also known as: Teresa Nervosa
- Born: November 10, 1962; Arlington, Texas, U.S.
- Died: June 18, 2023 (aged 60)
- Genres: Experimental rock; punk rock
- Occupation: Musician
- Instrument: Drums
- Formerly of: Butthole Surfers

Teresa Taylor (November 10, 1962 – June 18, 2023), also known as Teresa Nervosa, was an American drummer who was a member of the experimental rock band Butthole Surfers.

== Biography ==
Taylor was born in Arlington, Texas. She began drumming by playing for various high school marching bands in Texas' Fort Worth and Austin areas. King Coffey, another Surfers' drummer, was one of her fellow performers in high school.

Taylor was one of two Surfers drummers from 1983 through 1989 (the other being Coffey), with the exception of a brief leave of absence from late 1985 to 1986. In that band, she and Coffey played in unison on separate stand-up drum kits. Her drumming can be heard on a number of key Surfers albums, including Psychic... Powerless... Another Man's Sac, Rembrandt Pussyhorse, and Locust Abortion Technician (see "Discography" section).

Shortly after leaving the band in 1989, Taylor was diagnosed with an aneurysm and subsequently underwent brain surgery. She also started to suffer from strobe light-induced seizures.

Taylor had a small role in director Richard Linklater's 1990 film, Slacker. She played a woman who was trying to sell a pap smear from Madonna. Taylor's character, listed as "Pap smear Pusher", also appeared on the movie's poster and subsequent home video media covers. The film, which Taylor became a face of, was credited for defining Generation X's "slacker" image.

In 1995, Coffey indicated that Taylor was employed at the Texas School for the Blind and Visually Impaired, and was working on a book about her experiences touring with the Butthole Surfers.

As of 2007, Taylor was living in Austin and still recording music with Gibby Haynes, who has a home studio there. In 2008, she returned to the Butthole Surfers: the band's website announced tour dates for 2009 including Taylor.

In November 2021, Taylor announced via a public Facebook post that she had been diagnosed with end-stage lung disease. In another post a year later, she described her death as "imminent," further noting that she had "received a loving message from Paul and spoke on the phone with King and Gibby. It's all been a blast....Ciao." Taylor died on June 18, 2023, at the age of 60. Her partner, Cheryl Curtice, said that she died "clean and sober, peacefully in her sleep".

== Family confusion ==
During her time with the Butthole Surfers, Taylor and Coffey repeatedly referred to themselves, and were referred to, as siblings (Butthole Surfers article at Trouser Press). However, in his 2001 book on the American punk movement, Our Band Could Be Your Life, author Michael Azerrad asserts that the two only presented themselves as brother and sister due to their similar appearances, and were not actually related.

== Discography ==
All albums and EPs released by the Butthole Surfers.

- 1984 Live PCPPEP
- 1984 Psychic... Powerless... Another Man's Sac
- 1985 Cream Corn from the Socket of Davis
- 1986 Rembrandt Pussyhorse
- 1987 Locust Abortion Technician
- 1988 Hairway to Steven
- 1989 Double Live (Butthole Surfers album)
- 1995 The Hole Truth... and Nothing Butt
- 2002 Humpty Dumpty LSD
- 2003 Butthole Surfers/Live PCPPEP

== Filmography ==
- 1988 Bar-B-Que Movie
- 1991 Slacker
