= Hold It In =

2014 album by Melvins

Studio album by Melvins
- Released: October 14, 2014
- Recorded: 2014
- Genre: Experimental rock, sludge metal
- Length: 52:55
- Language: English
- Label: Ipecac

Melvins chronology
Tres Cabrones (2013)	Hold It In (2014)	Three Men and a Baby (2016)

Hold It In is the 20th studio album by the Melvins, released on October 14, 2014. The lineup for this album features Melvins stalwarts Buzz Osborne and Dale Crover joined by Butthole Surfers members Paul Leary and Jeff Pinkus.

== Vinyl version ==
A single LP vinyl edition was released by Ipecac Recordings in December 2014, omitting the tracks "Eyes on You" and "House of Gasoline". A 10" single of Bride of Crankenstein was released by Amphetamine Reptile Records, featuring the omitted tracks.

Professional ratings
Aggregate scores
Source	Rating
Metacritic	72/100
Review scores
Source	Rating
AllMusic	3.5/5 stars
Consequence of Sound	C+
musicOMH	4.5/5 stars

== Track listing ==
All songs written by Osborne, Pinkus and Crover except where noted.

No.	Title	Writer	Length
1.	"Bride of Crankenstein"		2:49
2.	"You Can Make Me Wait"	Leary	2:49
3.	"Brass Cupcake"		3:24
4.	"Barcelonian Horseshoe Pit"		4:22
5.	"Onions Make the Milk Taste Bad"		5:01
6.	"Eyes on You"	Leary	3:24
7.	"Sesame Street Meat"		3:28
8.	"Nine Yards"		2:29
9.	"The Bunk Up"		7:35
10.	"I Get Along (Hollow Moon)"	Leary	2:25
11.	"Piss Pisstopherson"		2:58
12.	"House of Gasoline"		12:11

== Personnel ==
- King Buzzo – guitars, lead vocals (3, 5, 7, 9, 12), backing vocals
- Dale Crover – drums, backing vocals
- Paul Leary – guitars, lead vocals (2, 6, 10), backing vocals (3)
- JD Pinkus – bass, lead vocals (1, 8, 11), backing vocals

=== Additional personnel ===
- Paul Leary – engineering
- Toshi Kasai – engineering
- Stephen Haas – engineering
- John Golden – mastering
- Brian Gardner – mastering (2, 6 & 10)
- Mackie Osborne – design
