= USA/Mexico =

American noise rock supergroup

- Origin: Austin, Texas, United States
- Genres: Noise rock; sludge metal
- Years active: 2015–present
- Members: Nate Cross (bass); King Coffey; Craig Clouse
- Website: usamexico12xu.bandcamp.com

USA/Mexico is an American noise rock supergroup from Austin, Texas, United States.

== History ==
The band has their roots in the Austin, Texas noise rock scene, and features Butthole Surfers drummer, King Coffey, lead singer of Drain, Craig Clouse, and Nate Cross of Marriage on bass.

On May 26, 2017, USA/Mexico released their debut album, Laredo. Their second album, Matamoros came out on March 23, 2019.

== Discography ==
- Laredo (2017)
- Matamoros (2019)
