= The Jackofficers =

- Origin: San Antonio, Texas, USA
- Years active: 1990
- Label: Rough Trade
- Past members: Gibby Haynes; Jeff Pinkus

Digital Dump

Studio album by the Jackofficers
- Released: 1990
- Genres: House, experimental
- Length: 38:03
- Labels: Rough Trade (US); Naked Brain (UK)
- Producer: The Jackofficers

The Jackofficers was a short-lived side project started by Gibby Haynes and Jeff Pinkus of the Butthole Surfers. They released their only album, Digital Dump, in 1990 and disbanded the same year following a brief club tour that found them simply hitting play on a Sony Walkman and standing there while it played. The music consisted entirely of samples manipulated and mixed on early computer software and f/x. Samples range from Jimi Hendrix spoken words to The Texas Chain Saw Massacre.

== Critical reception ==
Professional ratings
Review scores
Source	Rating
AllMusic	3/5 stars
Chicago Tribune	2.5/4 stars

The Chicago Tribune wrote: "Sounding somewhere between industrial dance such as Ministry and Herbie Hancock, this stuff is OK if you want to dance in a dump." Spin called it "mega-brilliant weirdness." The Washington Post stated that the album is "a little funkier, and a little funnier, than most industrial."

== Track listing ==
No.	Title	Length
1.	"Love-O-Maniac"	3:05
2.	"Time Machines Pt. 1"	4:57
3.	"Time Machines Pt. 2"	4:05
4.	"L.A. Mama Peanut Butter"	3:28
5.	"Do It"	3:20
6.	"Swingers Club"	4:18
7.	"Ventricular Refibulation"	4:03
8.	"#6"	2:44
9.	"Don't Touch That"	3:09
10.	"An Hawaiian Christmas Song"	3:33
11.	"Flush"	1:21
Total length:		38:03
