= Widowermaker =

Widowermaker!

EP by Butthole Surfers
- Released: September 6, 1989
- Recorded: 1989
- Label: Touch and Go; Blast First; Torso

Butthole Surfers chronology
Double Live (1989)	Widowermaker! (1989)	The Hurdy Gurdy Man (1990)

Professional ratings
Review scores
Source	Rating
Allmusic	3/5 stars

Widowermaker! is the third studio EP by American punk band Butthole Surfers, released in September 1989. All songs were written by Butthole Surfers.

This was the band's last release on Touch and Go Records.

== Track listing ==
1. "Helicopter" – 6:47
2. "Bong Song" – 3:41
3. "The Colored F.B.I. Guy" – 2:46
4. "Booze, Tobacco, Dope, Pussy, Cars" – 2:19

== UK edition ==
The UK edition, on Blast First, was originally released on 10" vinyl. It was later reissued on a mini CD with a plastic clip-on cover to fit in all CD players.

It has the same tracks with slightly different names and in a different order to the US release.

1. "Bon Song"
2. "1401"
3. "Booze Tobacco"
4. "Helicopter"

"1401" is the true name of "The Colored FBI Guy", as it is always used on set lists. The name is a reference to the address of the house that Butthole Surfers lived in at the time.

== Personnel ==
- Gibby Haynes – lead vocals
- Paul Leary – guitar
- Jeff Pinkus – bass
- King Coffey – drums

== Charts ==
Chart (1989)	Peak position
UK Indie Chart	1
