= Butthole Surfers (EP) =

EP by Butthole Surfers
- Released: July 1983
- Recorded: 1982–1983; San Antonio, Texas
- Studio: BOSS Studios
- Genre: Punk rock
- Length: 18:38
- Label: Alternative Tentacles
- Producers: Butthole Surfers, Mike Taylor

Butthole Surfers chronology
Butthole Surfers (1983)	Live PCPPEP (1984)

Back cover

Alternative cover
- Later editions of Alternative Tentacles' 12-inch vinyl version, with "Brown Reason to Live" title

Professional ratings
Review scores
Source	Rating
Allmusic	3/5 stars
The Austin Chronicle	4/5 stars
Pitchfork Media	6.2/10
Robert Christgau	A−
Rolling Stone	3/5 stars
Sputnikmusic	4.5/5 stars
Trouser Press	favorable

Butthole Surfers is the debut studio EP by American rock band Butthole Surfers, released in July 1983. It is also known as Brown Reason to Live and Pee Pee the Sailor. All songs were written and produced by Butthole Surfers.

The album was originally released on Alternative Tentacles. The center label on vinyl printings invited listeners to play the record at 69 RPM, a joke referencing the famous sex position. The album's back cover features a mildly distorted image of famed Mexican luchador Santo. Kurt Cobain listed the EP in his top fifty albums of all time.

== Music ==
The album consists of seven songs that mostly feature heavily distorted guitar with largely nonsensical, barely intelligible lyrics, alternately sung by lead vocalist Gibby Haynes and guitarist Paul Leary. Haynes also plays saxophone and drums on some tracks. Unlike later Butthole Surfers albums, no electronic instrumentation is present.

Having parted ways with their original drummer, Scott Matthews, shortly before entering the studio, Butthole Surfers used a number of different percussionists on this album. The last of them, King Coffey, is still with the band to this day. Bassist Bill Jolly was also a relatively new addition, joining after original bass player Quinn Matthews quit at the same time as his brother, Scott. Jolly would also play on the Surfers' first official live release, Live PCPPEP, and their first full-length album, Psychic... Powerless... Another Man's Sac.

== Title ==
The 1983 release had no title, although the text "Pee Pee the Sailor" on one of the center labels could be interpreted as such.

Since 1991, most re-releases have the title Brown Reason to Live added to the cover, but it is missing on Latino Buggerveil's 2003 cd compilation Butthole Surfers/Live PCPPEP, and the "Discography" section of the band's official website kept listing it as "Butthole Surfers". The similar words 'A BROWN REASON FOR LIVING' were etched into the run-out grooves of some 1983 pressings of the EP.

== Background ==
The sessions for Butthole Surfers were made possible by an earlier Butthole Surfers concert at Los Angeles, California's Whisky a Go Go, where they had opened for Dead Kennedys and T.S.O.L. The band gained an early admirer in Dead Kennedys' lead vocalist Jello Biafra, who also ran Dead Kennedys' Alternative Tentacles record label. Biafra told the band that, if they got someone to loan them studio time, Alternative Tentacles would reimburse the studio once the album was complete.

According to guitarist Paul Leary, the band then talked Bob O'Neill, owner of San Antonio, Texas' BOSS Studios, (a.k.a. Bob O'Neill's Sound Studio, a.k.a. the Boss), into loaning them the required time. Joe Pugliese, a San Antonio music promoter, recalled that lead singer Gibby Haynes slept at the studio during these sessions. Mike Taylor, an engineer at BOSS Studios, assisted with the EP's production. Taylor would later record and assemble the contents of 1984's Live PCPPEP.

== Track listing ==
=== Side 1 ===
All tracks are written by Gibby Haynes and Paul Leary, except where noted.

No.	Title	Length
1.	"The Shah Sleeps in Lee Harvey's Grave"	2:09
2.	"Hey"	2:06
3.	"Something"	4:36
Total length:		8:51

=== Side 2 ===
No.	Title	Writer(s)	Length
1.	"Bar-B-Q Pope"	Haynes, Leary, King Coffey	3:36
2.	"Witchita Cathedral"	Haynes, Leary, Coffey	2:22
3.	"Suicide"		1:24
4.	"The Revenge of Anus Presley"		2:25
Total length:			9:47 (18:38)

== Personnel ==
- Gibby Haynes - lead vocals ("Hey," "Wichita Cathedral," and "Suicide"), saxophone
- Paul Leary - guitar, lead vocals ("The Shah Sleeps in Lee Harvey's Grave," "Something," and "Bar-B-Q Pope")
- Bill Jolly - bass
- King Coffey - drums ("Bar-B-Q Pope" and "Wichita Cathedral")
- Brad Perkins - drums on "The Shah Sleeps in Lee Harvey's Grave" and "The Revenge of Anus Presley"
- Keith Rumbo - vocals on "The Revenge of Anus Presley"
- Various musicians - drums (all other tracks)

== Charts ==
Chart (1984)	Peak position
UK Indie Chart	21
