= Cream Corn from the Socket of Davis =

EP by Butthole Surfers
- Released: January 1986 (US); October 1985 (UK)
- Recorded: 1984–1985
- Genre: Avant-garde, hardcore punk, psychedelic rock
- Length: 16:24
- Label: Touch and Go (US); Fundamental (UK)
- Producer: Butthole Surfers

Butthole Surfers chronology
Psychic... Powerless... Another Man's Sac (1984)	Cream Corn from the Socket of Davis (1986)	Rembrandt Pussyhorse (1986)

Back cover

Alternative cover
- UK cover

Professional ratings
Review scores
Source	Rating
Allmusic	3/5 stars

Cream Corn from the Socket of Davis is the second studio EP by American punk band Butthole Surfers, released in October 1985. All songs were written and produced by Butthole Surfers.

The EP was originally released on Touch and Go. It was also included with CD editions of Rembrandt Pussyhorse in the U.S. and Psychic... Powerless... Another Man's Sac in the UK. Rembrandt Pussyhorse and Cream Corn... were again packaged as a single album when they were reissued on Latino Buggerveil in 1999.

== Music ==
Highly eclectic, Cream Corn... finds Butthole Surfers exploring blues, industrial music, psychedelic rock, and country rock in the space of four songs. While guitarist Paul Leary has described Cream Corn... as an unfinished full-length album, lead vocalist Gibby Haynes has said it was conceived as a single with additional songs.

It is unclear if Teresa Nervosa performed on all four songs, as she left the band for a short time in 1985. She has been confirmed as playing on "To Parter" and "Tornadoes."

Three of the EP's songs – "Moving to Florida," "Comb," and "To Parter" – are often performed at the band's live concerts.

"Moving to Florida"'s first spoken words would later be sampled by Japanese noise band Hanatarash on their track "Butthole Surfers/Pisshole Surfers".

== Title and cover ==
The "Davis" in the album's title is a reference to American entertainer Sammy Davis Jr., while the "socket" alludes to the socket of his left eye, which he lost in an automobile accident in 1954. The album's original cover concept called for an image depicting cream corn spewing from Davis' eye socket. The commissioned piece did not match the band's expectations though, and they decided to use a different cover image while keeping the concept's name.

According to guitarist Paul Leary, he acquired the eventual cover image by chance while purchasing marijuana from an acquaintance in San Antonio, Texas. The image's photographer was at the acquaintance's residence for the same reason, and happened to have his portfolio with him. After a session of beer drinking and impromptu guitar playing, Leary accidentally caused some of the photographer's photos to fall on the floor. One of these pictures was a group shot depicting the young girl seen on Cream Corn's cover, but surrounded by six older models. Leary commented that he liked it, the photographer gave him the photo and its reproduction rights, and the girl's picture was cropped, blown up, and used on the EP's U.S. cover.

The cover image that has become most associated with the EP was not used on its original American pressing; it featured a plain green sleeve and a clear vinyl record, and was marketed as a pre-release edition.

== Background ==
The EP was recorded in Athens, Georgia, and New York City. Two of its songs, "To Parter" and "Tornadoes," were originally intended as part of the band's Rembrandt Pussyhorse album, which was completed long before Cream Corn...'s debut. Alternative Tentacles, who had the initial option to release Rembrandt Pussyhorse (first titled Rembrandt Pussy Horse), held it for a year before ultimately declining to publish it. While waiting on Alternative Tentacles, Butthole Surfers released this EP through Touch and Go. It is not known if the inclusion of two proposed Rembrandt Pussyhorse songs on Cream Corn... factored into Alternative Tentacles' final decision.

== Reception ==
John Leland at Spin said, "Heirs to the Flipper throne, they challenge your ability to withstand the intensely moronic tedium of their song structures. Men have been driven insane by less. The Buttholes even throw in some odd time signatures, just to show that the joke is not entirely on you. As if you cared."

== Track listing ==
All songs written and produced by Butthole Surfers.

=== Side A ===
1. "Moving To Florida" – 4:32
  - Gibby Haynes - lead vocals
  - Paul Leary - guitar, bass
  - King Coffey - drums
2. "Comb" – 4:57
  - Gibby Haynes - lead vocals
  - Paul Leary - guitar, bass
  - King Coffey - drums

=== Side B ===
3. "To Parter" – 4:20
  - Gibby Haynes - lead vocals
  - Paul Leary - guitar
  - Terence Smart - bass
  - King Coffey - drums
  - Teresa Nervosa - drums
4. "Tornadoes" – 2:36
  - Gibby Haynes - lead vocals
  - Paul Leary - guitar
  - Terence Smart - bass
  - King Coffey - drums
  - Teresa Nervosa - drums

== Personnel ==
All songs written and produced by the Butthole Surfers.

- Gibby Haynes – lead vocals
- Paul Leary – guitar, bass ("Moving To Florida" and "Comb")
- Terence Smart – bass ("To Parter" and "Tornadoes")
- King Coffey – drums
- Teresa Nervosa – drums ("To Parter" and "Tornadoes")

== Charts ==
Chart (1985)	Peak position
UK Indie Chart	9
