= Rembrandt Pussyhorse =

Studio album by Butthole Surfers
- Released: April 18, 1986 (US); 1986 (Europe)
- Recorded: 1984–1985
- Genres: Experimental rock; noise rock; hardcore punk; psychedelic rock; acid rock
- Length: 32:48
- Labels: Touch and Go (US); Red Rhino Europe (EUR)
- Producer: Butthole Surfers

Butthole Surfers chronology
Cream Corn from the Socket of Davis (1985)	Rembrandt Pussyhorse (1986)	Blind Eye Sees All (1986)

Back cover

Alternative cover
- European cover

Rembrandt Pussyhorse is the second studio album by American experimental rock band Butthole Surfers, released on April 18, 1986. All of its songs were written and produced by the band, except for the Guess Who cover "American Woman" and "Perry", which borrows from Fred Steiner's theme music for the television series Perry Mason.

Originally released on Touch and Go, the album was reissued on Latino Buggerveil in 1999. The CD versions of the album include the 1985 Cream Corn from the Socket of Davis EP.

== Music ==
Rembrandt Pussyhorse is arguably the most experimental release in Butthole Surfers' considerably experimental catalog. Making heavy use of in-studio tape editing and sound modulation, the album adds piano, organ, and violin, among other sounds, to Butthole Surfers' then-usual battery of electric guitar, bass, and dual drummers. According to guitarist Paul Leary and lead vocalist Gibby Haynes, Butthole Surfers were a four-piece for most of these sessions, with Leary playing the majority of the bass lines.

However, not all the new instrumentation was performed by the band. The piano on "Creep in the Cellar", written by Haynes, and the organ on "Perry" were played by the recording studio's owner, who offered free studio time in exchange for being included on the album.

Also of note is the violin heard on "Creep in the Cellar". This was the result of Butthole Surfers purchasing a used 16-track tape on which a country band had previously recorded. Upon playing their mix of "Creep in the Cellar", the band discovered they had inadvertently kept one of the country band's channels, which contained a backwards violin track. Liking the way it worked with the song, they opted to keep it.

Finally, the growls on "Mark Says Alright" are from a pit bull that the band owned at the time named Mark Farner of Grand Funk Railroad, after Mark Farner of Grand Funk Railroad.

== Background ==
Drummer King Coffey said that Rembrandt Pussyhorse was originally intended as an EP, but eventually evolved into a full-length album. Recording took place over a number of months and in a handful of studios to fit into the band's then-grueling touring schedule. Most of the songs were recorded on 16-track equipment.

The album was finished prior to the 1985 Cream Corn from the Socket of Davis EP and, according to Coffey, was primarily recorded in 1984, approximately four months after the sessions for Psychic... Powerless... Another Man's Sac. Like its predecessor, this album was also originally intended for release on Alternative Tentacles, although with a different mix, song selection, and title (Rembrandt Pussy Horse). However, after delaying for nearly a year, the label refused to release it. Although it eventually surfaced on Touch and Go, its release was further delayed when the band opted to record the songs "Sea Ferring" and "Mark Says Alright" to replace "To Parter" and "Tornadoes," rather than recycle them after their inclusion on the Cream Corn... EP. Outtakes from those sessions can be found on 2002's Humpty Dumpty LSD.

The track "Strangers Die Everyday" is used during the end credits of Richard Linklater's film Slacker. The movie includes a cameo by Butthole Surfers drummer Teresa Nervosa.

== Reception ==
Professional ratings
Review scores
Source	Rating
AllMusic	4/5 stars
Robert Christgau	B−
Rolling Stone	4/5 stars

Timothy White of Spin said the vocals had "the loutish paranoia of the violently meandering Texas acid-rock tracks that comprised the best album filler during the genre's golden mid-60s heyday" and said the "drum textures achieve a contorted hip-hop crunch that would make Arthur Baker blanch".

== Track listing ==
Side 1

All tracks are written by Gibby Haynes, Paul Leary, and King Coffey.

No.	Title	Writer(s)	Length
1.	"Creep in the Cellar"	Haynes	2:05
2.	"Sea Ferring"		4:00
3.	"American Woman"	Randy Bachman, Burton Cummings, Jim Kale, Garry Peterson	5:33
4.	"Waiting for Jimmy to Kick"		2:21
5.	"Strangers Die Everyday"	Haynes	3:08

Side 2

No.	Title	Writer(s)	Length
6.	"Perry"	Haynes, Leary, Coffey, Fred Steiner	3:32
7.	"Whirling Hall of Knives"		4:44
8.	"Mark Says Alright"		4:08
9.	"In the Cellar"		3:18
Total length:			32:48

US CD bonus tracks (Cream Corn from the Socket of Davis EP)

No.	Title	Length
1.	"Moving to Florida"	4:32
2.	"Comb"	4:57
3.	"To Parter"	4:20
4.	"Tornadoes"	2:36

== Personnel ==
- Gibby Haynes – lead vocals
- Paul Leary – guitar, bass guitar
- Trevor Malcolm – bass (2, 8)
- King Coffey – drums
- Teresa Nervosa – drums (except 10 and 11)
- Terence Smart – bass (12, 13)
- Bob O'Neill – piano (1), organ (6)

== Charts ==
Chart (1986)	Peak position
UK Indie Chart	9
