= Latino Buggerveil =

US record label

Latino Buggerveil is an independent record label and publishing company that was founded by psychedelic noise-punk band the Butthole Surfers.

The label's first release was the 1987 album A Texas Trip, a various artists compilation which was co-released by Caroline Records. Following 1989's Double Live, a limited edition release documenting the band's 1988 tour, Latino Buggerveil became largely dormant as a record company and was instead used as the new name for the group's publishing company, which until that point was known as "Second Harvest."

In 1999, the Butthole Surfers reactivated the label in order to reissue most of the group's 1980s catalogue, whose rights had reverted to the group following a lawsuit with Touch and Go Records. The band signed a distribution deal with Revolver USA, who had previously handled label imprints created by fellow noise rock bands Sonic Youth (Smells Like Records and SYR) and the Swans (Young God Records).

Latino Buggerveil is run by Butthole Surfers drummer King Coffey, who had previously operated the independent record label Trance Syndicate from 1990 to 1998. The label's name and logo were originally designed by Butthole Surfers singer Gibby Haynes.

Apart from being co-credited on Haynes' 2004 solo record (released primarily through Surfdog Records and not officially counted in the current LBV catalogue system), Latino Buggerveil appears mainly to be a conduit for archival Butthole Surfers releases, as evinced by the reissue of the group's first two Alternative Tentacles releases on one CD and the rarities collection Humpty Dumpty LSD. (A sequel to LSD was initially planned but has since been placed on indefinite hold.) The label's first official side project release was the debut album from Rubble, a band featuring Coffey.

== Discography ==
- Various Artists - A Texas Trip (1987, co-released with Caroline Records) LBV01
- Butthole Surfers - Double Live (1989) LBV02
- Butthole Surfers - Psychic... Powerless... Another Man's Sac (1999, reissue) LBV03
- Butthole Surfers - Rembrandt Pussyhorse/Cream Corn from the Socket of Davis (1999, reissue) LBV04
- Butthole Surfers - Locust Abortion Technician (1999, reissue) LBV05
- Butthole Surfers - Hairway to Steven (1999, reissue) LBV06
- Butthole Surfers - Humpty Dumpty LSD (2002) LBV07
- Butthole Surfers - Butthole Surfers/Live PCPPEP (2003, reissue) LBV08
- Butthole Surfers - Piouhgd/Widowermaker (2007, reissue) LBV09
- Rubble - Farewell Drugs (2011) LBV10

== See also ==
- List of record labels
