= Phloen Phromdaen =

- เพลิน พรหมแดน
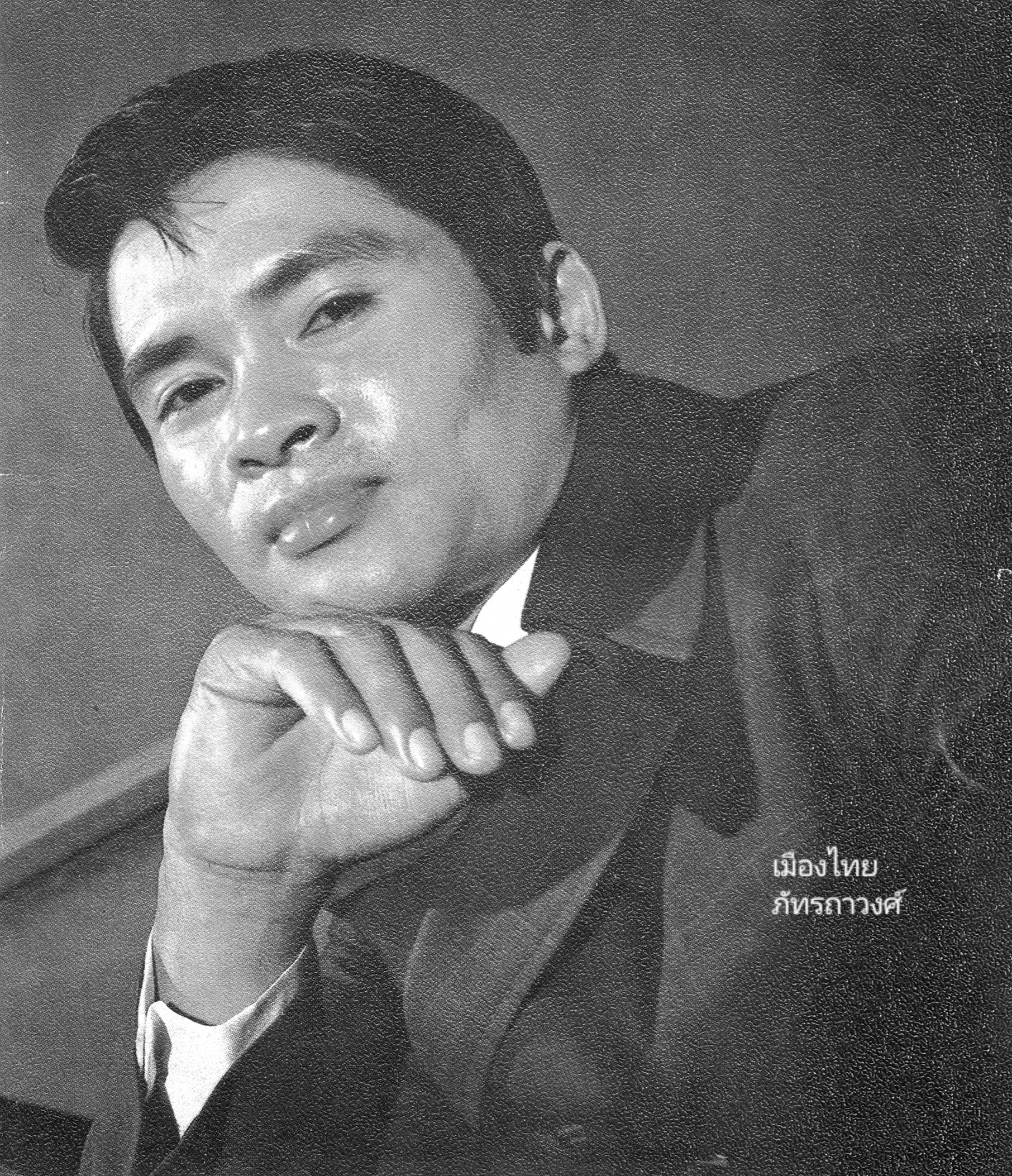
- Phromdaen, c. 1960s
- Born: Somsuan Promsawang (สมส่วน พรหมสว่าง); 12 June 1939; Aranyaprathet, Prachinburi, Siam
- Died: 3 August 2024 (aged 85); Siriraj Hospital, Bangkok
- Occupation: Singer • Actor
- Musical career
- Genres: Luk thung
- Years active: 1965–2024
- Label: PGM Record

Somsuan Promsawang (Thai: สมส่วน พรหมสว่าง) (12 June 1939 – 3 August 2024), professionally known Phloen Phromdaen (Note: The word "Phromdaen" literally translated as "border" or "frontier", what with his native Aranyaprathet is on the border with Cambodia. For "Phloen" means "enjoy" or "have fun".) (Thai: เพลิน พรหมแดน) was a Thai Luk thung (Thai country song) and speak story singer, and a 2012 winner of National Artist from Thailand award.

He was born on 12 June 1939 in Aranyaprathet District, Prachinburi Province (now in Sa Kaeo Province) to father Pluem and mother Tun. He had five cousins. He has been actively performing since the 1970s. Few people know that Phromdaen was the first luk thung singer to use female hang khrueang (หางเครื่อง, "luk thung dancers") dressed in beautiful feathered costumes, which became a role model for later female luk thung hang khrueang.

He was notable in the psychedelic music area. Phloen died on 3 August 2024, at the age of 85.

== Discography ==
- Samak Duan (สมัครด่วน)
- Khao Soad Soad (ข่าวสดๆ)
- Phoo Taen Ma Lew (ผู้แทนมาแล้ว)
- Lung Dee Khee Maw (ลุงดีขี้เมา)
- Aa Tee Sak Mang Korn (อาตี๋สักมังกร)
- Pao Pun Jin Phao San (เปาบุ้นจิ้นเผาศาล)
- Chom Rom Lek Ded (ชมรมเลขเด็ด)
