= Jeff Pinkus =

American bassist (born 1967)

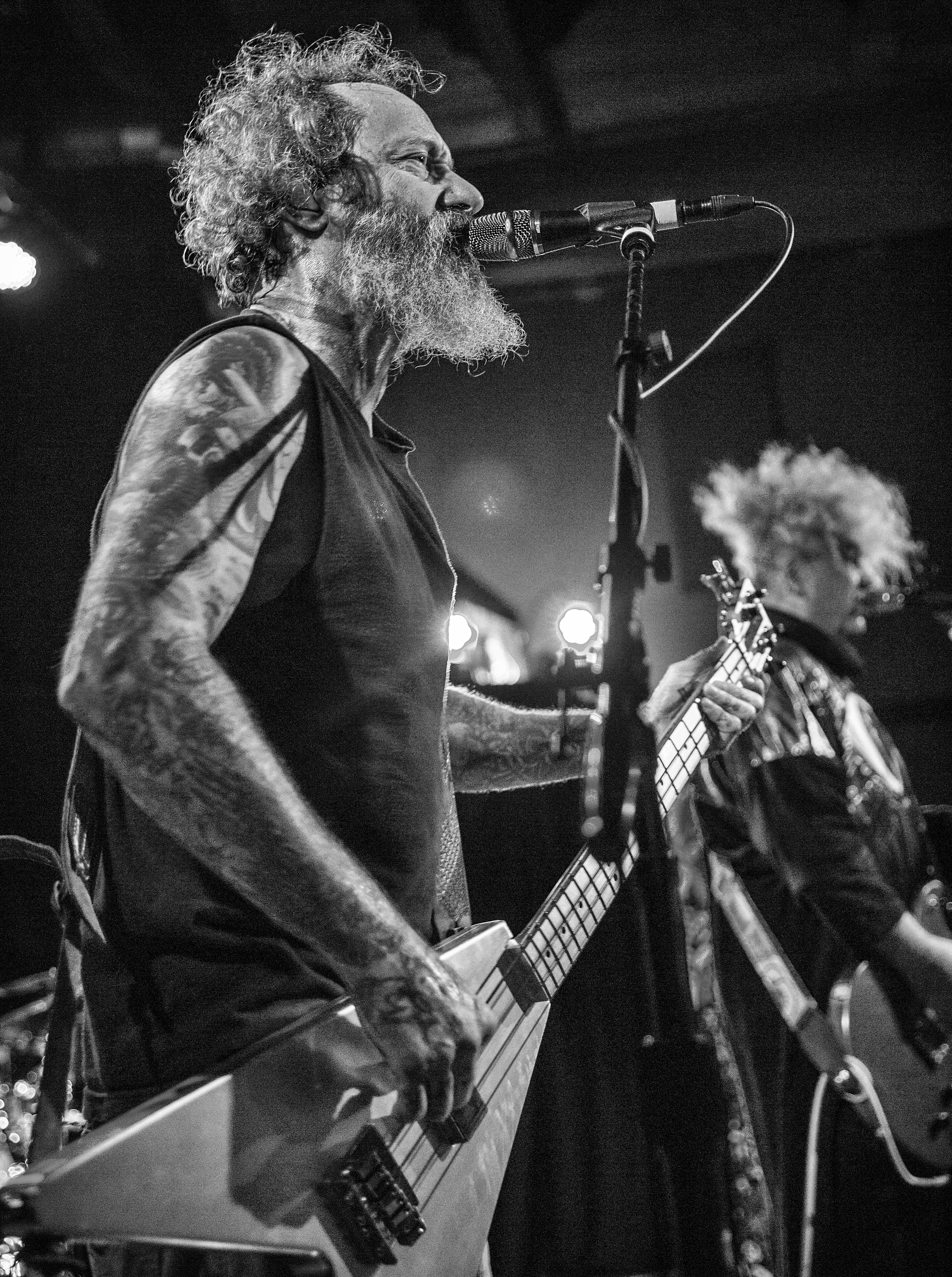
- Pinkus with Melvins in 2018

Background information
- Also known as: J.D. Pinkus, The World-Famous Petey D. Peckerwood
- Born: Jeffrey David Pinkus; October 26, 1967 (age 58)
- Genres: Hard rock; alternative metal; punk rock; noise rock; psychedelic rock
- Occupations: Musician; songwriter
- Instruments: Bass guitar; vocals
- Years active: 1985–present
- Website: jdpinkus.com

Jeffrey David "J.D." Pinkus (born October 26, 1967) is an American bassist best known for his work with Butthole Surfers from 1985 to 1994 and since their 2009 reunion.

In 1990, he and Butthole Surfers' lead vocalist Gibby Haynes released Digital Dump, the only album from their psychedelic house music side project The Jackofficers.

Upon leaving Butthole Surfers, Pinkus worked full-time with the Austin trio Daddy Longhead, which he had assembled during his waning months in the band, and which included longtime Atlanta associate Jimbo Young on guitar and Rey Washam on drums. Daddy Longhead retired after 10 years, leaving Pinkus free to explore other projects including Skinny Leonard and Areola 51. Pinkus played with Helios Creed on his albums NUGG: The Transport and Activated Condition, and has also collaborated with Bad Livers frontman Danny Barnes several times in a live setting.

He was leader of the band Honky and during 2008 played weekly in Austin, Texas, with an assortment of other musicians called the Guit Down Syndrome.

On their 30th anniversary tour in 2013, Pinkus joined Melvins in place of Jared Warren (on paternity leave) as well as performing with the opening Honky. He subsequently joined the Melvins full-time, touring with them in 2014 in support of the album Hold It In, which also featured Butthole Surfers founder Paul Leary, and again in 2015. He also plays on the song "Captain Come Down" which was first released in 2015 on Chaos as Usual, a split release with Le Butcherettes, and later included on the 2016 album Basses Loaded.

In 2018, J.D. Pinkus released a solo album, Keep on the Grass on cassette tape on Minner Bucket Records and compact disc on Heavy Feather Records. It was recorded entirely on banjo and features a rendition of the song "Bride of Crankenstein" from the Melvins album Hold It In. The CD release show with Sleep in San Pedro was on September 15, 2018. The b-side "11:11" was used on the Coup Sur Coup Records Various Artists compilation Feedback Through A Magnifying Glass Volume I in 2018.

On February 12, 2018, the Melvins announced that Pinkus would be joining them, alongside current bassist Steven McDonald (Redd Kross), on their next album and subsequent tour. Released on April 20, 2018, the aptly titled Pinkus Abortion Technician features both bass players and four songs written or co-written by Pinkus.

On August 27, 2021, the band Tiny Tree released "XI" and JD Pinkus performed on the track titled "December" through the label Onama Media Group.

== Select discography ==
=== Butthole Surfers ===
- 1987 – Locust Abortion Technician
- 1988 – Hairway to Steven
- 1989 – Double Live
- 1989 – Widowermaker (EP)
- 1991 – piouhgd
- 1993 – Independent Worm Saloon

=== The Jackofficers ===
- 1990 – Digital Dump

=== Daddy Longhead ===
- 1991 – Cheatos
- 1997 – Supermasonic
- 1998 – Classic
- 2021 – Twinkle

=== Areola 51 ===
- 2002 – Areola 51
- 2014 – The Double D Sides
- 2015 – Bootleg Series Vol 3: Areola 51 at Headhunters

=== Honky ===
- 1998 – Honky
- 2000 – Attacked by Lesbians in a Chicago Bowling Alley
- 2001 – House of Good Tires
- 2005 – Balls Out Inn
- 2012 – 421
- 2016 – Corduroy

=== Melvins ===
- 2014 – Hold It In
- 2016 – Basses Loaded (on the song "Captain Come Down")
- 2018 – Pinkus Abortion Technician
- 2021 – Five Legged Dog (on "Everybody's Talking" and "Don't Forget to Breathe")

=== Pure Luck ===
- 2017 – Pure Luck

=== Tall Tall Trees ===
- 2023 – Ponder Machine

=== Solo ===
- 2018 – Keep on the Grass (Minner Bucket/Heavy Feather)
- 2021 – Fungus Shui (Heavy Feather/Shimmy Disc)
- 2024 – Grow A Pear (Shimmy Disc)
