= Butthole Surfers =

American rock band

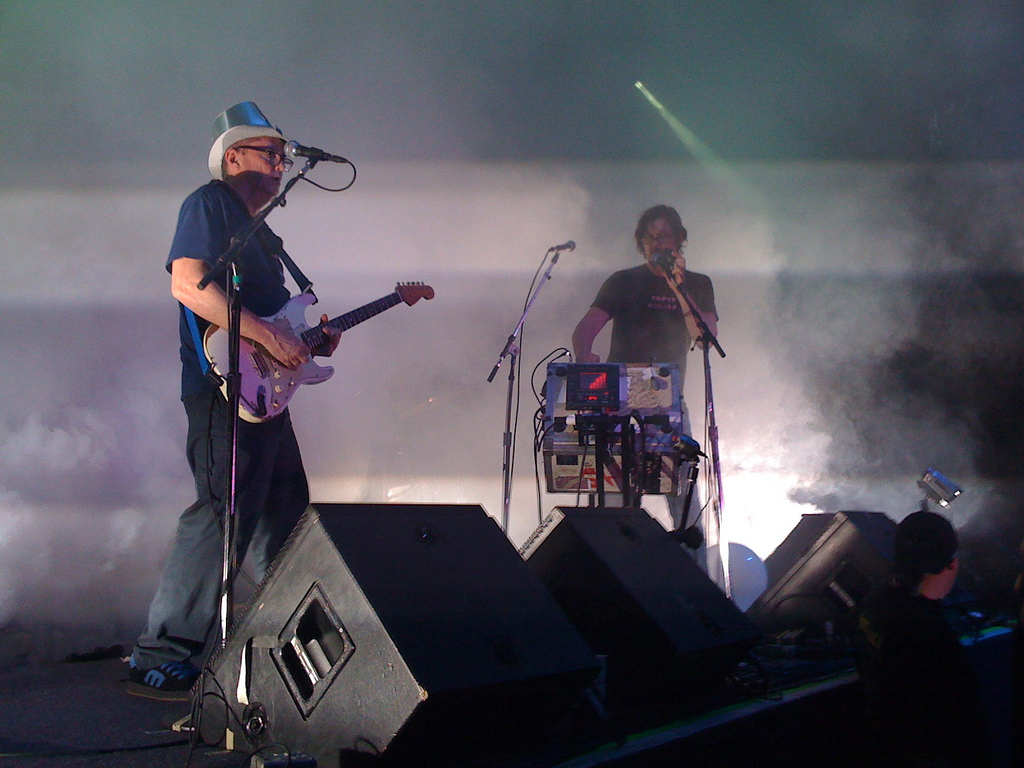
- Butthole Surfers performing at the Fillmore in San Francisco in 2009

Background information
- Origin: San Antonio, Texas, U.S.
- Genres: Noise rock; experimental rock; alternative rock; psychedelic rock; post-hardcore; art punk
- Works: Discography
- Years active: 1981–2017; 2025–present
- Labels: Alternative Tentacles; Touch and Go; Blast First; Au Go Go; Latino Buggerveil; Rough Trade; Capitol; Trance Syndicate; Surfdog; Hollywood
- Members: Gibby Haynes; Paul Leary; King Coffey; Jeff Pinkus
- Past members: see members section

The Butthole Surfers are an American rock band formed in San Antonio, Texas, by singer Gibby Haynes and guitarist Paul Leary in 1981. The band has had numerous personnel changes, but its core lineup of Haynes, Leary, and drummer King Coffey remained consistent since 1983. Teresa Nervosa served as second drummer, playing alongside Coffey from 1983 to 1985, 1986 to 1989, and 2009. The band had also employed a variety of bass players, most notably Jeff Pinkus.

Emerging from the 1980s hardcore punk scene, the Butthole Surfers quickly became known for their chaotic live shows, black comedy, and a sound that incorporated elements of psychedelia, noise rock, and punk as well as their use of sound manipulation and tape editing. Their sound would subsequently be considered influential to the emerging grunge music scene in the 1990s.

Although they were respected by their peers and attracted a devoted fanbase, the Butthole Surfers had little commercial success until 1996's Electriclarryland. The album contained the hit single "Pepper", which climbed to number one on Billboard's Modern Rock Tracks chart that year. Following the commercial failure of their 2001 follow-up album Weird Revolution, Butthole Surfers continued as mainly a live band until their hiatus in 2017. The band reunited in 2025, and in the following year, they released their first studio album in 25 years, After the Astronaut, which was originally intended to be the follow-up to Electriclarryland but was abandoned for nearly three decades due to record label issues.

== History ==
=== Formation (1976–1981) ===
The Butthole Surfers formed at Trinity University in San Antonio, Texas during the late 1970s, when students Gibson "Gibby" Haynes and Paul Leary Walthall (later just Paul Leary) met for the first time. Though it was their shared taste in non-mainstream music that caused them to become friends, both appeared to be headed for very conventional careers. Haynes, as captain of Trinity's basketball team, as well as the school's "Accountant of the Year", soon graduated to a position with a respected Texas accounting firm, while Leary remained in school working on his MBA degree.

In 1981, Haynes and Leary published the magazine Strange V.D., which featured photos of abnormal medical ailments, coupled with fictitious, humorous explanations for the diseases. After being caught with one of these pictures at work, Haynes left the accounting firm and moved to Southern California. Leary, at the time one semester shy of his degree, dropped out of college and followed Haynes. After a brief period spent selling homemade clothes and linens emblazoned with Lee Harvey Oswald's image, the pair returned to San Antonio and launched the band that would eventually become the Butthole Surfers.

=== Early years (1981–1984) ===
Haynes and Leary played their debut show at a San Antonio night club, The Bonham Exchange, in 1981; at that time, they had not yet settled on the band name "Butthole Surfers". By 1982, the band was backed by the sibling rhythm section composed of bassist Quinn Mathews and his brother, drummer Scott Mathews. The band did not gain a following in San Antonio, and purchased a van to return to California later that summer.

During a brief concert at the Tool and Die club in San Francisco, Dead Kennedys frontman and Alternative Tentacles overseer Jello Biafra witnessed their performance and became a fervent fan. Biafra invited the group to open for Dead Kennedys and T.S.O.L. at the Whisky a Go Go in Los Angeles, and soon made an offer that would launch their recording career; if they could get someone to lend them studio time, Alternative Tentacles would reimburse the studio when the album was complete. The band then returned to San Antonio to record at BOSS Studios (a.k.a. Bob O'Neill's Sound Studios, a.k.a. the Boss). However, the Mathews brothers did not enter the studio with Haynes and Leary; the two had quit following a physical altercation between Scott Mathews and Haynes. The bass position was taken over by Bill Jolly, who would play on the Butthole Surfers' next two releases, and a number of drummers participated. The last of these, King Coffey (born Jeffrey Coffey), is still with the band to this day.

Released on Alternative Tentacles in July 1983, the resulting EP, Butthole Surfers (also known as Brown Reason to Live and Pee Pee the Sailor), offered songs with provocatively absurd titles like "The Shah Sleeps in Lee Harvey's Grave" and "Bar-B-Q Pope", alternately sung by Haynes and Leary. (Haynes would become the band's primary singer by the time of their first LP.) The album cover, like the many bizarre illustrations that would accompany Surfers' succeeding work, was designed by the band itself. Teeming with humor, Butthole Surfers laid the foundation for what was to come. It influenced at least one future superstar in Nirvana frontman Kurt Cobain, who listed it as one of his ten favorite albums in his Journals. Cobain later went on to list the album Pee Pee the Sailor by the Butthole Surfers as one of the fifty most influential albums for Nirvana's sound. Cobain would later meet his wife, Courtney Love of Hole, at a Butthole Surfers/L7 concert in 1991.

Soon after the release of Butthole Surfers, the band recruited a second drummer, Teresa Nervosa (born Teresa Taylor), who had played with Coffey in a number of high school marching bands in the Texas' Fort Worth and Austin areas. She and Coffey would drum in unison on separate, stand-up kits, adding to the spectacle of Surfers' ever-evolving stage show. Though Nervosa and Coffey repeatedly referred to themselves, and were referred to, as siblings, it has since been revealed that the two only presented themselves as such due to their similar appearances, and are not actually related. With her arrival, the band's core "classic lineup"—Haynes, Leary, Coffey, and Nervosa—was in place. With the exception of a number of different bass players and Nervosa's brief sabbatical from late 1985 to 1986, it remained largely unchanged until her final departure in 1989. In 2008, she returned to the band—their website announced 2009 tour dates including "Teresa Taylor".

In 1984, the band returned to BOSS Studios to record enough material for two full-length albums. Both were originally offered to Alternative Tentacles, with the first being Psychic... Powerless... Another Man's Sac. Before either album could be released, though, Alternative Tentacles had to acquire the master tapes from Bob O'Neill, BOSS Studios' namesake and owner. He refused to release them until he'd been reimbursed for the sessions, and Alternative Tentacles couldn't immediately afford to pay. After months of waiting, the band issued the concert recording Live PCPPEP on Alternative Tentacles out of financial desperation in September 1984. Mostly made up of live performances of songs from their debut, it prompted some critics and fans to joke that they had released the same album twice. Meanwhile, Bob O'Neill was preparing to release Psychic... on his own Ward 9 label to recoup his expenses.

=== Legend grows (1984–1987) ===
With some members working as dishwashers, the group was unhappy about the album being released on Ward 9. Terry Tolkin, a friend and their East Coast booking agent, signed the band to Corey Rusk's then-nascent Touch and Go Records in Detroit. Psychic...Powerless...Another Man's Sac was released in 1984. Building on their first EP, the band made psychedelia a much bigger part of their sound on this release, which made full use of the tape editing, non-traditional instrumentation, and sound modulation that came to define their studio recordings.

Just before the release of Psychic..., and with new bassist Terence Smart in tow (the first of many through 1986), the band commenced their first nationwide tour. It was on this outing that they truly established a national presence, starting at Touch and Go's early headquarters in Detroit before heading to New York City, where they impressed members of Sonic Youth, as well as Shockabilly member (and future Butthole Surfers bassist) Kramer. They then crisscrossed the country for several months, including a show in Seattle, that made a fan of future Soundgarden guitarist Kim Thayil. While in San Francisco at the end of the tour, and without a place to live, the band collectively decided to move to Winterville (a small town outside Athens, Georgia), where they admittedly made a hobby of stalking members of R.E.M. They purportedly planned to leave a van parked in front of Michael Stipe's house, with "Michael Stipe/Despite the Hype/I Still Wanna Suck/Your Big Long Pipe" painted on the side. Smart quit after falling in love with a friend of the band, and Trevor Malcolm, a young Canadian musician recommended by Touch and Go, replaced him on bass.

Word was spreading about the band's bizarre stage show by the time they hit the road again, resulting in ever-larger audiences at their concerts. Not long after Malcolm's arrival, the band recorded their act for posterity by filming two concerts at Detroit's Traxx club. Some of this footage was eventually packaged as Blind Eye Sees All, their only official video release to date. They purchased their first 8-track recorder at this time, and used it to record two songs later used on the A-side of Cream Corn from the Socket of Davis.

Reportedly unhappy with life in the band, Malcolm quit in mid-1985. A friend of the band's from Athens, Juan Molina, was brought in for a brief U.S. tour, but was not interested in becoming a full-time member. Without a permanent bassist and a quickly approaching European tour looming—the band's first—they contacted Kramer, who quickly agreed to join. Meanwhile, their second LP, which had been submitted to Alternative Tentacles as Rembrandt Pussy Horse, was still in limbo. The reasons for Alternative Tentacles' actions are unclear, but it is known that the label delayed a decision for about a year before ultimately refusing to publish it. While waiting, the band released the four-song Cream Corn from the Socket of Davis EP on Touch and Go in late 1985. Once Alternative Tentacles finally declined, the group went back into Kramer's Noise New York studio to record two new tracks to replace "To Parter" and "Tornadoes", which were originally intended for Rembrandt... before appearing on the Cream Corn... EP's B-side.

Following the European tour, the Butthole Surfers experienced more upheaval when Nervosa left around Christmas 1985, as she was tired of the living conditions associated with constant touring and had a desire to be with family. She was replaced by another female drummer, Kytha Gernatt, who was dubbed Cabbage Gomez Jr. in the press soon after joining the band. Cabbage had previously performed with Kathleen Lynch (a.k.a. Kathleen, a.k.a. Ta-Da the Shit Lady) in the band Easturn Stars; Lynch gained fame as the Butthole Surfers' naked dancer from 1986 to 1989. Kramer also left during this period and was replaced by Jeff Pinkus, who gave the band's bass position its longest period of stability by staying until 1994.

Their second LP was finally issued as Rembrandt Pussyhorse on Touch and Go in April 1986. Coming out some two years after the original sessions, it featured a different mix and song selection than Alternative Tentacles' unreleased version. Best known for its minimalist reworking of The Guess Who's "American Woman", it is one of the most experimental albums in the Butthole Surfers' heavily experimental career. Following a particularly out-of-control tour, even by the Butthole Surfers' standards, the band semi-settled in Winterville in the summer of 1986. Nervosa rejoined them (Cabbage having been fired months earlier), and they went to work on crafting their first home studio in a rental house on the outskirts of Athens. Before long, they started a leisurely recording session for their third full-length project. Released in March 1987, Locust Abortion Technician is one of the heaviest Butthole Surfers albums, and it is often considered their finest to date. Harnessing aspects of punk, heavy metal, and psychedelia, its unique sound produced a number of grinding, slower-paced songs, arguably making it an early precursor of grunge.

=== Evolution (1987–1991) ===
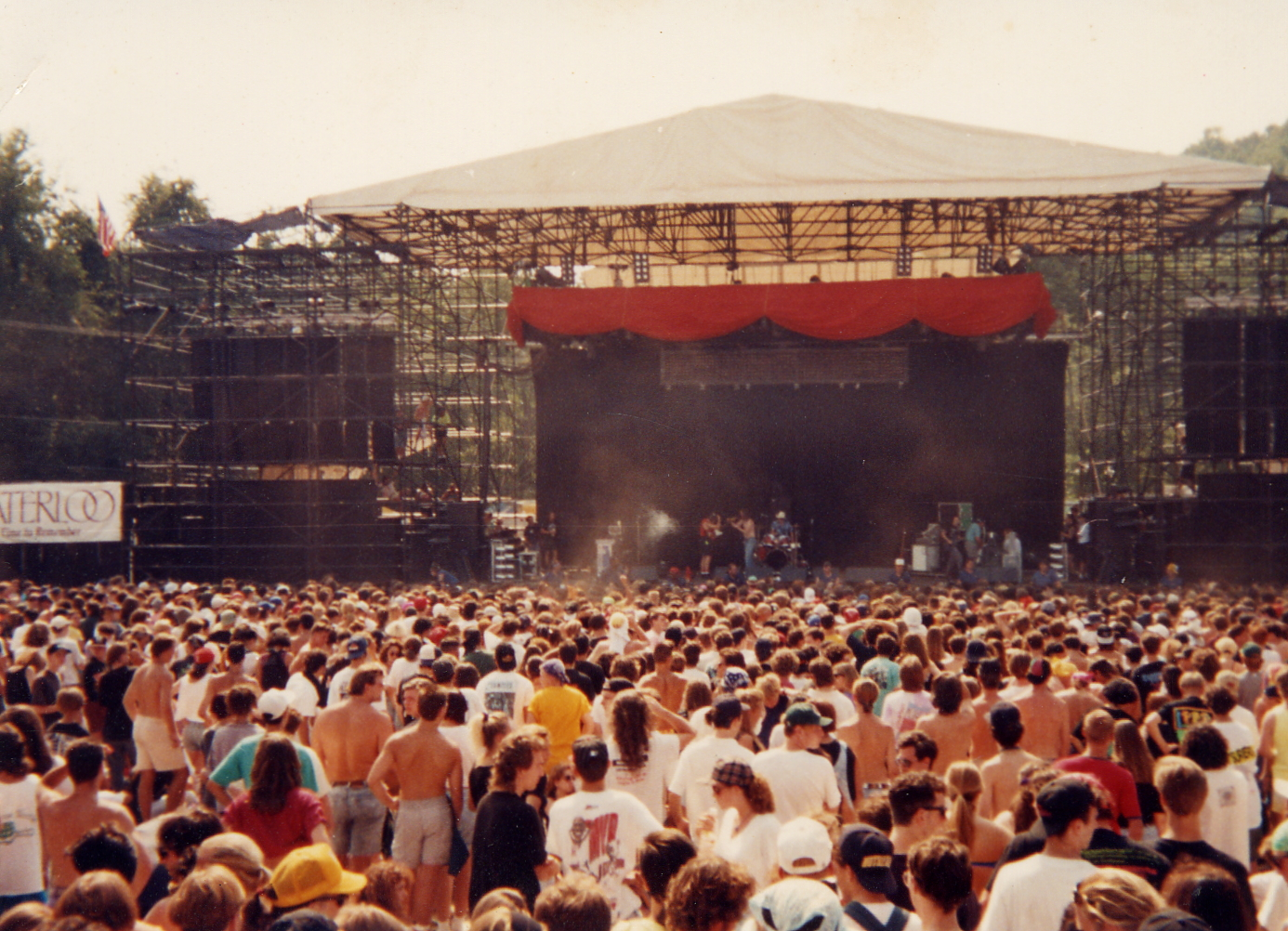
Butthole Surfers at Lollapalooza 1991

Around the time of Locust Abortion Technician's debut, the group bought a home in Driftwood, Texas, approximately 30 miles (48 km) outside Austin. It was a ranch house built into the side of a hill, with 5 acres (20,000 m^{2}) of surrounding property. As with the rental home near Athens, the compound was turned into a de facto recording studio. They did not live together in the new house for long, though, with Coffey being the first to move out and get his own place. They all had separate residences by 1991.

In early 1988, the Butthole Surfers were ready to record a new album and wanted to use a modern studio for the first time, choosing a state-of-the-art facility in Texas. The following sessions took only one week, as the band had been performing most of the material for years. The band opted to follow this album's blueprint on future projects. In contrast, songs on their earlier recordings had undergone far more in-studio development and experimentation. Pinkus has expressed the opinion that the later, better-organized sessions stifled much of the spontaneous creativity that had propelled their earlier releases.

Hairway to Steven was issued in April and marked a midway point between the band's experimental roots and the more accessible recordings that would follow. While half of the material is as extreme sounding as their earlier work, other songs are more conventional. This was the first Butthole Surfers album to make extensive use of acoustic guitar. Hairway to Steven did not have song titles when first released and instead represented each track with an absurdist, often scatological, cartoon. The band traveled widely in support of the album over the next year, including a very successful tour of Europe (helped in part by the influence of new UK distributor Blast First). Like their studio recordings, their live shows were beginning to lose much of their earlier chaos.

While touring during the winter of 1988, the Butthole Surfers used a portable DAT recorder to tape various concerts. The strongest of these recordings were packaged as Double Live, a limited edition double album released on vinyl and cassette in 1989, and on CD the following year. This was the first release on the band's Latino Buggerveil label. Although the album, as of spring 2007, is out of print, its songs are available as free MP3 downloads on the band's official website. Issued in response to widespread, for-profit bootlegging of their live shows, it contained performances of songs from all of their previous studio albums and EPs.

Double Live was to be the last Butthole Surfers album to feature Nervosa, who left early in 1989. Shortly after leaving, she was diagnosed with an aneurysm, and was forced to undergo brain surgery. She further began to suffer from strobe light-induced seizures. In 1991, Nervosa (who has gone by Teresa Taylor since her retirement) had a small role in Richard Linklater's film Slacker. She was employed at the Texas School for the Blind and Visually Impaired as recently as 1995.

The Butthole Surfers did not seek to replace her at the time, and opted to continue as a quartet. Following a final EP for Touch and Go—1989's Widowermaker—the band left their longtime recording partners to sign with longtime supporter Terry Tolkin at Rough Trade Records who had also brought them to Touch and Go, for a reportedly generous one-album deal. Prior to the new LP's debut, Rough Trade talked the band into first releasing 1990's The Hurdy Gurdy Man, which previewed material from the coming release. The same year, Rough Trade issued Digital Dump by The Jackofficers, Haynes and Pinkus's psychedelic house music side project.

piouhgd (pronounced "p.o.-ed", as in "pissed off") was the band's fifth full-length studio album, and their first for Rough Trade. Released in April 1991, it featured more electronic instrumentation, but was largely viewed as a disappointment in comparison to past recordings. Both Haynes and Leary have since expressed displeasure with the album. Regardless, the band was invited to be part of that summer's inaugural Lollapalooza tour. Around this time, Haynes collaborated with Ministry, contributing vocals on their 1991 single "Jesus Built My Hotrod", which was later included on 1992's Psalm 69: The Way to Succeed and the Way to Suck Eggs.

=== Mainstream recognition (1991–1999) ===
Rough Trade filed for bankruptcy in 1991, but not before releasing Leary's solo project, The History of Dogs. The following year, the Butthole Surfers shocked many fans and critics by signing with the major label Capitol Records. In 2017, Paul Leary reflected: "I grew up listening to The Beatles and Grand Funk Railroad and Dean Martin, and the thought of being on the same record label that they were on was too fucking weird, really weird. A lot of people gave us grief for doing that, but fuck: I wasn't going to turn that down."

Capitol immediately reissued piouhgd and paired the band with their first big-name producer, John Paul Jones, best known as the bassist for Led Zeppelin. The fruit of their partnership, 1993's Independent Worm Saloon, featured a more straightforward rock approach at Jones's insistence. This paid off for the Butthole Surfers, giving them their first minor radio hit, "Who Was in My Room Last Night?". It reached number 24 on Billboard's Modern Rock Tracks singles chart, while the album peaked at number 124 on the Billboard 200. Two of the new songs were featured on episodes of MTV's Beavis and Butt-head. Guitarist and huge influence on the Butthole Surfers, Helios Creed played guitar on two of the songs from the record, "The Annoying Song" and "Clean It Up".

When Pinkus left in 1994, the remaining members enlisted a series of fill-in musicians, and continued to tour sporadically, even as all three pursued side projects. Haynes was working with Johnny Depp, Bill Carter, Sal Jenco, Flea, and others in a new group, P. In 1993, Haynes played with this band in Los Angeles' Viper Room, on the night the actor River Phoenix died of a drug overdose. Meanwhile, Leary was building a reputation as a skilled music producer, while Coffey set up his own record label Trance Syndicate. According to Leary and industry insiders, Haynes was increasingly dependent on hard drugs at this time, although Haynes has downplayed their concerns.

In 1995, the band contributed a cover of the Underdog theme song to be included on the tribute album Saturday Morning: Cartoons' Greatest Hits, produced by Ralph Sall for MCA. Later that year, Haynes's side project, P, issued an eponymous LP on Capitol, while Coffey's Trance Syndicate label released the first Butthole Surfers compilation album. Titled The Hole Truth... and Nothing Butt, it was mostly live tracks recorded at different venues from 1985 to 1991. In December, the Butthole Surfers initiated what would become an extended legal battle with Touch and Go. At first, they sought a higher royalty rate, feeling that the label was doing little beyond keeping their back catalog in print. The case quickly became a fight for all ownership rights that dragged on for more than three years.

In 1996, Capitol released the Butthole Surfers' Electriclarryland, which reached number 31 on the Billboard 200; the single "Pepper" topped the Billboard Modern Rock Tracks chart. Around this time, the band's songs began appearing on major Hollywood soundtracks, including Baz Luhrmann's Romeo + Juliet, Mike Judge's Beavis and Butt-Head Do America, and John Carpenter's Escape from L.A.

Despite stronger sales with their second Capitol album, the band's relationship with the label grew increasingly strained. A planned 1998 album, After the Astronaut, was scrapped, and the Butthole Surfers parted ways acrimoniously with their manager, Tom Bunch.

In 1999, the Butthole Surfers won their lawsuit against Touch and Go. The victory was not without controversy: several peers in the alternative music community — among them Fugazi and Minor Threat frontman Ian MacKaye — criticized the band for pursuing the case. Haynes and others responded that they would not have filed suit had label head Rusk conducted himself honestly. Rusk had provided the band with incomprehensible accounting statements and continued to maintain his innocence even after the U.S. Circuit Court of Appeals for the Seventh Circuit ruled against him.

With the litigation resolved, the band reissued Psychic... Powerless... Another Man's Sac, Rembrandt Pussyhorse (paired with the Cream Corn... EP), Locust Abortion Technician, and Hairway to Steven on their own Latino Buggerveil label.

=== Recent years (2000–present) ===
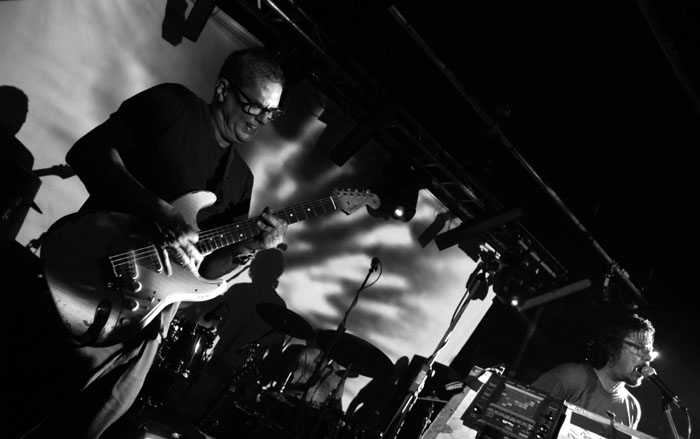
Butthole Surfers performing in Poland in 2009

In 2000, the band hired Nathan Calhoun as bassist. Having resolved their dispute with Capitol, the Butthole Surfers re-recorded most of After the Astronaut's songs for Weird Revolution, on the Hollywood Records/Surfdog Records imprint. The album was released in August 2001, and reached number 130 on the Billboard 200. It was their most electronic album to date and had a hip hop sound. The single "The Shame of Life" peaked at number 24 on the Billboard Modern Rock Tracks chart.

Since then, the group has released two compilations on Latino Buggerveil: 2002's Humpty Dumpty LSD is a compilation of studio outtakes, while 2003's Butthole Surfers/Live PCPPEP, combines their first two Alternative Tentacles EPs. In 2004, Haynes formed Gibby Haynes and His Problem, who released an eponymous album on Surfdog Records later that year. While promoting the side project, Haynes indicated that another Butthole Surfers studio album was likely, and remarked that it would be "noisy". However, no release date has been announced.

The band reunited with Jeff Pinkus and Teresa Nervosa for a tour of the East Coast and Europe in Summer 2008 with the Paul Green School of Rock All Stars. It was the first time the reunited line up played together since 1989. The group performed at the All Tomorrow's Parties festival curated by Melvins and Mike Patton of Faith No More. The group's appearance at All Tomorrow's Parties led to a dispute with ATP founder and organizer Barry Hogan, who told a reporter for the Village Voice that the Butthole Surfers (along with Killing Joke and The Black Lips) would never play the festival again. The reunited 1986-1989 "classic" lineup continued to tour into 2009, with stops in the United States and Canada.

In Austin, Texas, during their last scheduled show for the North American/Canada 2008–2009 tour on October 31, 2009, Haynes said "We played our first show as the Butthole Surfers in Austin. And this may be our last." Haynes has not yet clarified this statement. Recently, Paul Leary and King Coffey have both stated that the band will tour again if they can pull off another album. The Butthole Surfers played two shows in Austin at Scoot Inn during Halloween 2010. A report in The New York Times suggested that, even though The Butthole Surfers had not released an album of new material since 2001, the "songs are practically incidental to the spectacle" after seeing them perform along with psychedelic band Lumerians in Brooklyn.

The line-up of Haynes, Leary, Pinkus, and Coffey did a 12-show tour of mostly western U.S. states and one appearance in Canada from August 26, 2011, to September 11, 2011.

As of 2016, the group are on hiatus, with Leary saying: "I just don't want to play live anymore. It's not fun, I don't like touring. That hour on stage is a whole lot of fun, but the other 23 hours off stage just fucking suck."

They performed at the Day for Night music festival in Houston, Texas, which ran December 17–18, 2016.

In an interview with The Quietus in March 2017, Leary talked about the group possibly making a new album, their first in 16 years: "We've all been busy with our own separate things, and I've done a lot of producing in the past few years, and I've got to the point now where I feel like I've done doing that for a while, so it's time to make a new Butthole Surfers album. Especially now that Trump is president, jeez! If there was ever a time for a Butthole Surfers album it's fucking now. It just doesn't get any weirder than that."

In March 2019, the band released a visual history coffee table book, Butthole Surfers: What Does Regret Mean?, with author Aaron Tanner.

In May 2025, the band released the live album Live at the Leatherfly on Sunset Blvd Records.

On September 23, 2025, Haynes, Leary, Coffey and Pinkus reunited at Los Angeles’ Egyptian Theatre to perform a brief set as the Butthole Surfers for the first time since October 2017, following the West Coast premiere of the documentary film The Hole Truth and Nothing Butt.

In December 2025, the song "Human Cannonball" from Locust Abortion Technician was featured in Chapter 7 of the fifth season of Stranger Things. On March 17, 2026, the band announced that After the Astronaut would finally be released on June 26 by Sunset Boulevard Records. The album's announcement came with the release of the single "Jet Fighter".

== Prior band names ==
The band went through several names before settling on the Butthole Surfers, after a master of ceremonies at their first paid show did not recall the name they were using at the time, and instead used their first song in the setlist, "Butthole Surfer" from Psychic... Powerless... Another Man's Sac, as an impromptu name. They decided to keep the moniker and have been billed as such ever since. Prior to this, they deliberately performed under a different name for every live performance; their aliases according to Haynes included the Dick Clark Five (a pun on the Dave Clark Five), Nine cm Worm Makes Own Food, the Vodka Family Winstons, the Ashtray Babyheads, Ed Asner Is Gay, Fred Astaire's Asshole (also varied as the Right to Eat Fred Astaire's Asshole, or the Inalienable Right to Eat Fred Astaire's Asshole), and Zipgun.

The band name the Butthole Surfers was controversial in the course of their career, with clubs, newspapers, radio, and TV stations refusing to print or mention their full name in the 1980s and 1990s. Variations were instead abbreviations such as "B.H. Surfers". In a 1996 Rolling Stone interview, when asked if he could go back and choose a more appropriate name for the band, Haynes replied in retaliatory jest that he "would name the band: I'm Going to Shit in Your Mother's Vagina."

== Live performances ==
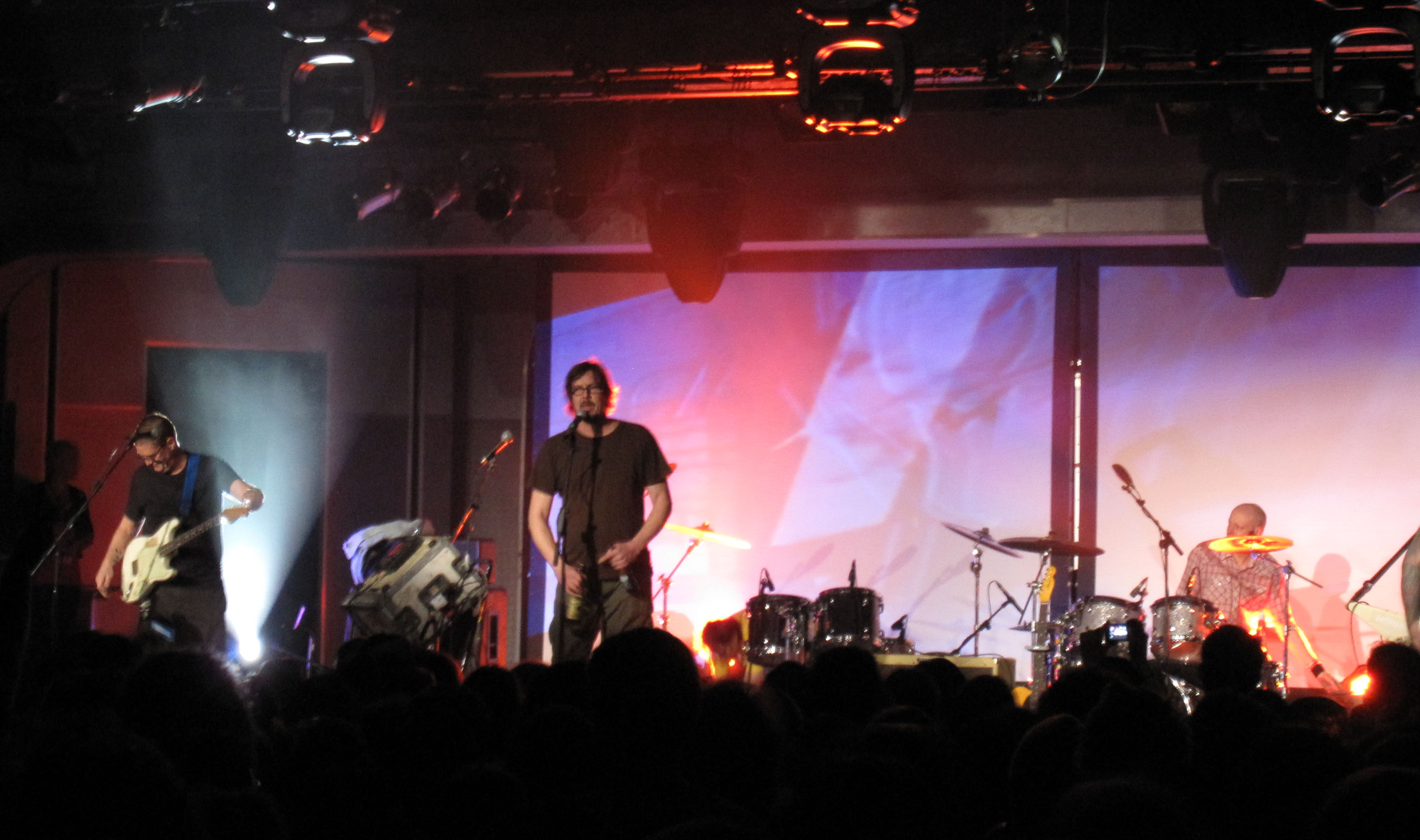
Butthole Surfers performing on December 6, 2008, in Minehead, England. This performance features strobe lights, smoke machines and a projected film in the background.

In the 1980s, the Butthole Surfers earned a reputation for their disturbing live performances that were both decadent and violent. As a result, they began to attract a wide range of curiosity seekers within a few years of their debut, in addition to traditional fans of punk rock who had supported them from the beginning. A staged reproduction of the band's live show was filmed for 1988's Bar-B-Que Movie, a short Super 8 mm film movie directed by Tom Stern and Alex Winter, who is best known as "Bill S. Preston, Esq." from Bill & Ted's Excellent Adventure. Bar-B-Que Movie is a spoof of 1974's The Texas Chain Saw Massacre, and the film ends with a music video-style performance of the song "Fast" (a.k.a. "Fart Song"), featuring Haynes, Leary, Coffey, Nervosa, and Jeff Pinkus, as well as dancer Kathleen Lynch. The track displayed many of the band's stage gimmicks, such as the burning cymbal, strobe lights, films, and smoke.

By the time Lynch left in 1989, the Butthole Surfers' stage show had become more predictable, with previously random shockers being done at the same point in each night's performance. Teresa Nervosa quit for good around the same time, and King Coffey became the band's sole percussionist. Strobe lights, smoke machines, and even Gibby Haynes' burning cymbal are still part of the presentation, but the chaotic spontaneity of their 1980s performances is no longer on display.

=== Appearance ===
Lead vocalist and saxophonist Haynes (who sometimes sang through a bullhorn), guitarist Paul Leary, dual drummers Coffey and Nervosa (the latter briefly replaced by Cabbage), and whichever bassist happened to be filling in at the time, had a visual aspect. As with their music, their appearance was exceptionally non-conventional in the early days, including sideways mohawks, dreadlocks, unnaturally colored hair, and the like.

Known for taking the stage at early concerts with hundreds of clothespins attached to his hair and clothes, Haynes would often strip throughout a show until he was down to his underwear, or less, by the end. Other attire included flasher-style trench coats over his nakedness, ridiculously home-styled wigs and cross-dressing; often employing a skirt made of an American flag and a large '60s torpedo-style stuffed bra. At other times he would hide condoms full of stage blood in his clothes and repeatedly fall to the floor, appearing to bleed profusely. Some of Haynes' other favorite tricks involved throwing handfuls of photocopied cockroach images into the crowd, rolls and rolls of toilet paper tossed across the audience, as well as filling an inverted cymbal with lighter fluid, setting it (and sometimes his hand) on fire, and repeatedly hitting it with a mallet. As previously mentioned he would sing through almost anything that would alter his voice, including toilet paper rolls and megaphones early on, which eventually evolved into "Gibby's kit", a.k.a. "Gibbytronix", a rack of vocal effects stacked as high as he could reach, before which he would often stand for the majority of the show in later performances. He also often utilized various foot switches which would be used to activate certain vocal effects, and when thought to be dancing during some performances he would actually be stepping on his various pedals. Adding to the spectacle were Coffey and Nervosa, who played in unison on stand-up drum kits; behind which they would collapse onto the floor and out of eyeshot, to collect their breath and strength before rising just in time to play the next song. Finally, the whole band would often tear apart stuffed animals while on stage, throwing the stuffing through the air, creating a rather disturbing throbbing effect, caused by the stroboscopes that were always on.

In 1986, they first met Lynch (a.k.a. Kathleen, a.k.a. Ta-Da the Shit Lady), who was then working at a strip club called Sex World in New York City. Though never an official member, she became the Butthole Surfers' famous "naked dancer", performing intermittently with them through 1989. One show in Washington, D.C., with Gwar saw Kathleen take the stage to dance in nothing but gold body paint and antique wooden snow shoes. At another particularly wild concert in 1986, Haynes and Lynch, by now completely bald, reportedly engaged in sexual intercourse while on stage, as Leary used a screwdriver to vandalize the club's speakers. This came after only five songs, during which time Haynes had started a small fire.

=== Equipment ===
The Butthole Surfers began to take the collection of visual equipment seriously following Coffey's recruitment in 1983, when he added a clear plastic drum fitted with a strobe light to their show. Shortly afterwards, the band purchased what was reported as several thousand dollars' worth of stolen strobe lights at a bargain rate, and their visual equipment soon took up more space than their instruments. Smoke machines were later added. Equally memorable was the band's propensity for projecting a variety of films behind them as they played, beginning with one 16-millimeter projector, before adding others. This set-up allowed them to play a number of overlapping movies at the same time which were often strangely angled, upside down or played in reverse. Combined with the increasing number of strobe lights, the effect created a visually disorienting atmosphere, which occasionally caused epileptic seizures in audience members. The films' subject matter were often as disturbing as the manner in which they were played; with images of accidents, nuclear explosions, meat processing, spiders and scorpions stalking prey, gory driver's education films, and penis reconstruction surgery. Not all of the movies were horrific, and they often included nature, wildlife, and aquatic footage; as well as a color negative of a Charlie's Angels episode.

== Documentary film ==
In 2025, the documentary film Butthole Surfers: The Hole Truth and Nothing Butt, directed by Tom Stern, premiered at South by Southwest in Austin, Texas The film chronicles the history and cultural impact of the band through interviews with members and collaborators, alongside archival footage and other multimedia elements. It premiered at the Paramount Theatre on March 12, 2025, as part of the festival’s documentary lineup.

== Members ==
- Gibby Haynes – vocals, rhythm guitar, saxophone, bass, keyboards and effects (1981–present)
- Paul Leary – lead guitar, bass, vocals, keyboards (1981–present)
- King Coffey – drums (1982–present)
- Jeff Pinkus – bass (1986–1994, 2008–present)

Former members

- Scott Matthews – drums (1981–1982)
- Scott Stevens – bass (1981)
- Andrew Mullin – bass (1981–1982)
- Quinn Matthews – bass (1982)
- Bill Jolly – bass (1982–1984)
- Teresa Nervosa – drums (1983–1985, 1986–1989, 2008–2009; died 2023)
- Terence Smart – bass (1984–1985)
- Trevor Malcolm – bass, sousaphone (1985)
- Mark Kramer – bass (1985)
- Kytha Gernatt (Cabbage) – drums (1985–1986)
- Nathan Calhoun – bass (2000–2002)

Touring members

- Juan Molina – bass (1985)
- Elliot Cunningham – dancer
- Kathleen Lynch – dancer (1986–1989)
- Kyle Ellison – guitar (1996)
- Owen McMahon – bass (1996)
- Josh Klinghoffer – guitar, drums (2001)
- Jason Morales – drums (2002)

== Discography ==
- Psychic... Powerless... Another Man's Sac (1984)
- Rembrandt Pussyhorse (1986)
- Locust Abortion Technician (1987)
- Hairway to Steven (1988)
- piouhgd (1991)
- Independent Worm Saloon (1993)
- Electriclarryland (1996)
- Weird Revolution (2001)
