= Gibby Haynes =

American musician

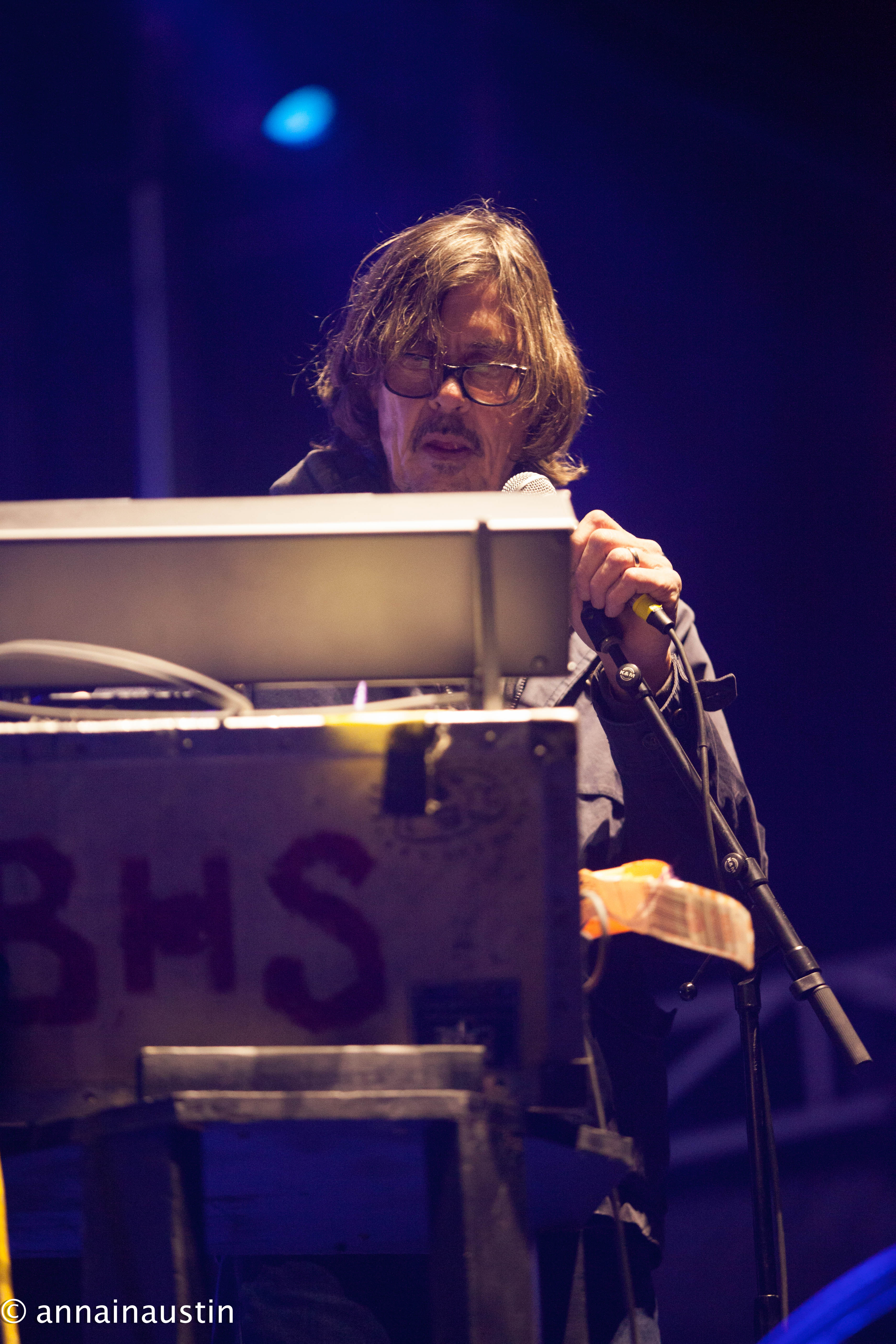
- Haynes in 2016

Background information
- Also known as: Gibby Haynes, Gibby, Jackofficer, Fritz Wang
- Born: Gibson Jerome Haynes; September 30, 1957 (age 69); Dallas, Texas, US
- Genres: Alternative rock; punk rock; experimental rock; noise rock; hardcore punk
- Instruments: Vocals; guitar; bass; saxophone; keyboards
- Years active: 1981–present
- Label: Latino Buggerveil

Gibson Jerome Haynes (born September 30, 1957) is an American musician, radio personality, painter, author and the lead singer of the band Butthole Surfers.

== Early life and career ==
Born and raised in Dallas, Texas, Gibby Haynes is the son of actor Jerry Haynes, best known as Dallas-based children's TV host "Mr. Peppermint," and Doris Haynes. His great-uncle was Fred E. Haynes Jr., a decorated U.S. Marines Corps major general. Haynes graduated from Lake Highlands High School in Dallas where he played basketball, and attended Trinity University to study accounting, where he was awarded as the "Accounting Student of the Year". After graduating, he went to work as an auditor for the accounting firm Peat Marwick.

In 1981, Haynes and Trinity classmate Paul Leary published the magazine Strange V.D., which featured photos of abnormal medical ailments, coupled with fictitious, humorous explanations for the diseases. After being caught with one of these pictures at work, Haynes left the accounting firm and moved to Southern California along with Leary. After a brief period spent selling homemade clothes and linens emblazoned with Lee Harvey Oswald's image, the pair returned to San Antonio and launched the band that would eventually become Butthole Surfers, famous for their elaborate stage shows and psychedelic music. Haynes would often fire a shotgun above the crowd during the Butthole Surfers live shows.

Haynes played saxophone on several albums, including the band's debut LP Psychic...Powerless...Another Man's Sac.

Haynes, along with Ministry frontman Al Jourgensen, lived with Timothy Leary, and were used as guinea pigs for his psychedelic experiments.

Haynes appeared with Ministry (recording the lead vocals on their song "Jesus Built My Hotrod") and the 2006 Revolting Cocks CD entitled Cocked and Loaded.

In 1995, Haynes fronted the band P with friend and actor Johnny Depp, releasing one album that included a song titled "Michael Stipe". Haynes' solo project, Gibby Haynes and His Problem, released one eponymous album in 2004 with the song "Redneck Sex" remixed by Peaches. In 2009, he produced a record of cover songs by the Lemonheads called Varshons that featured guest vocals from Liv Tyler and Kate Moss. Gibby Haynes did guest vocals for the Dead Milkmen and Deconstruction, Eric Avery's short-lived post-Jane's Addiction band, as well as for the song "Atlanta" by Mastodon. The song had a limited edition release to celebrate Record Store Day in April 2015 and can be found on Mastodon's 2020 album Medium Rarities.

Also a painter, in spring of 2011 Haynes exhibited some of his water colors and drawings at the Recess Activities space in the Kidd Yellin Gallery, located in Brooklyn, founded by Charlotte Kidd and Dustin Yellin.

== Work in film and television ==
In the mid-1980s, Haynes and the band interspliced footage from a raucous Detroit concert with pontifications on consciousness, mostly while lying together in a large bed, in the concert video Blind Eye Sees All. Haynes and Johnny Depp produced a mini-documentary about John Frusciante's life called Stuff. In late 1992, Haynes appeared in Gwar's first long-form video, Phallus in Wonderland, as director Fritz Wang. Haynes appeared briefly in Jim Jarmusch's 1995 film Dead Man as a man being fellated in an alley. He also has cameo appearances in Gregg Araki's 1997 film Nowhere as an eclectic party host named Jujyfruit and the Adult Swim television show Delocated. Additionally, he appears as uncredited in CB4.

Haynes plays a friar in the 2023 independent film The Sweet East.
