= King Coffey =

American drummer

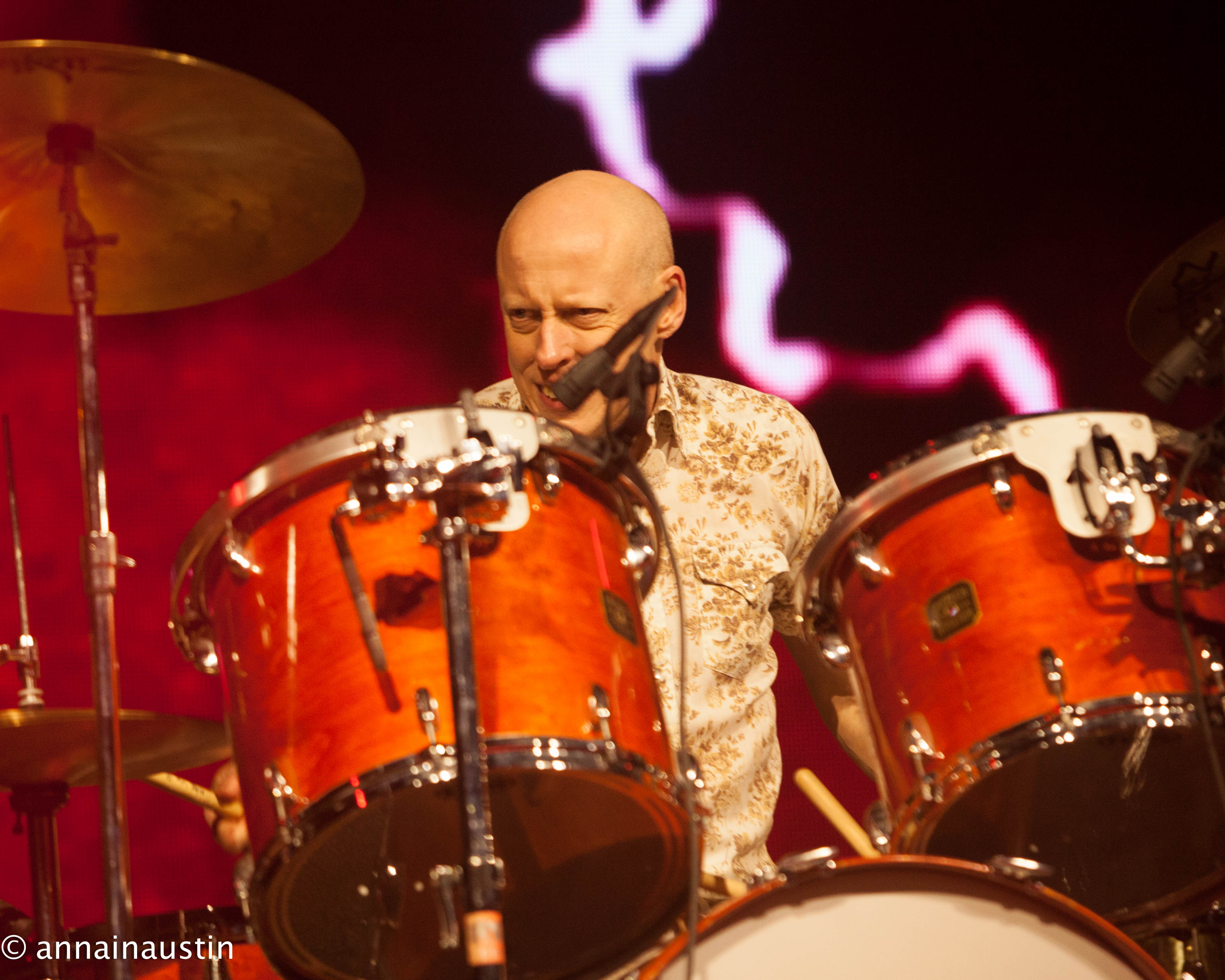
- Coffey in 2016

Background information
- Born: Jeffrey Coffey; 1964 (age 61–62)
- Genres: Hardcore punk
- Instrument: Drums

King Coffey (born Jeffrey Coffey; 1964) is an American drummer, known for being the drummer of the psychedelic/noise rock band Butthole Surfers.

He began drumming in a Fort Worth hardcore punk band called The Hugh Beaumont Experience in high school. Around that same time, he also published a fanzine called Throbbing Cattle. He saw the Butthole Surfers for the first time in 1982 at a time when Scott Matthews was their drummer. Coffey replaced him in 1983 and is still the band's official drummer.

In 1990, Coffey founded the independent record label Trance Syndicate, and released records by primarily Texas-based artists, including his band Drain. In 1995, he co-founded the Emperor Jones record label with his husband Craig Stewart.

Besides the Butthole Surfers and Drain, Coffey played in Rubble, Same Sac, Air Traffic Controllers, and guested on Daniel Johnston, Richard Buckner, and Shit and Shine recordings.

In 2001, Coffey was elected into the Austin Music Awards Hall of Fame.

Coffey currently runs the Latino Buggerveil record label, home to the Butthole Surfers' indie catalog, and drums for the noise rock band USA/Mexico.
