= Paul Leary =

American rock musician

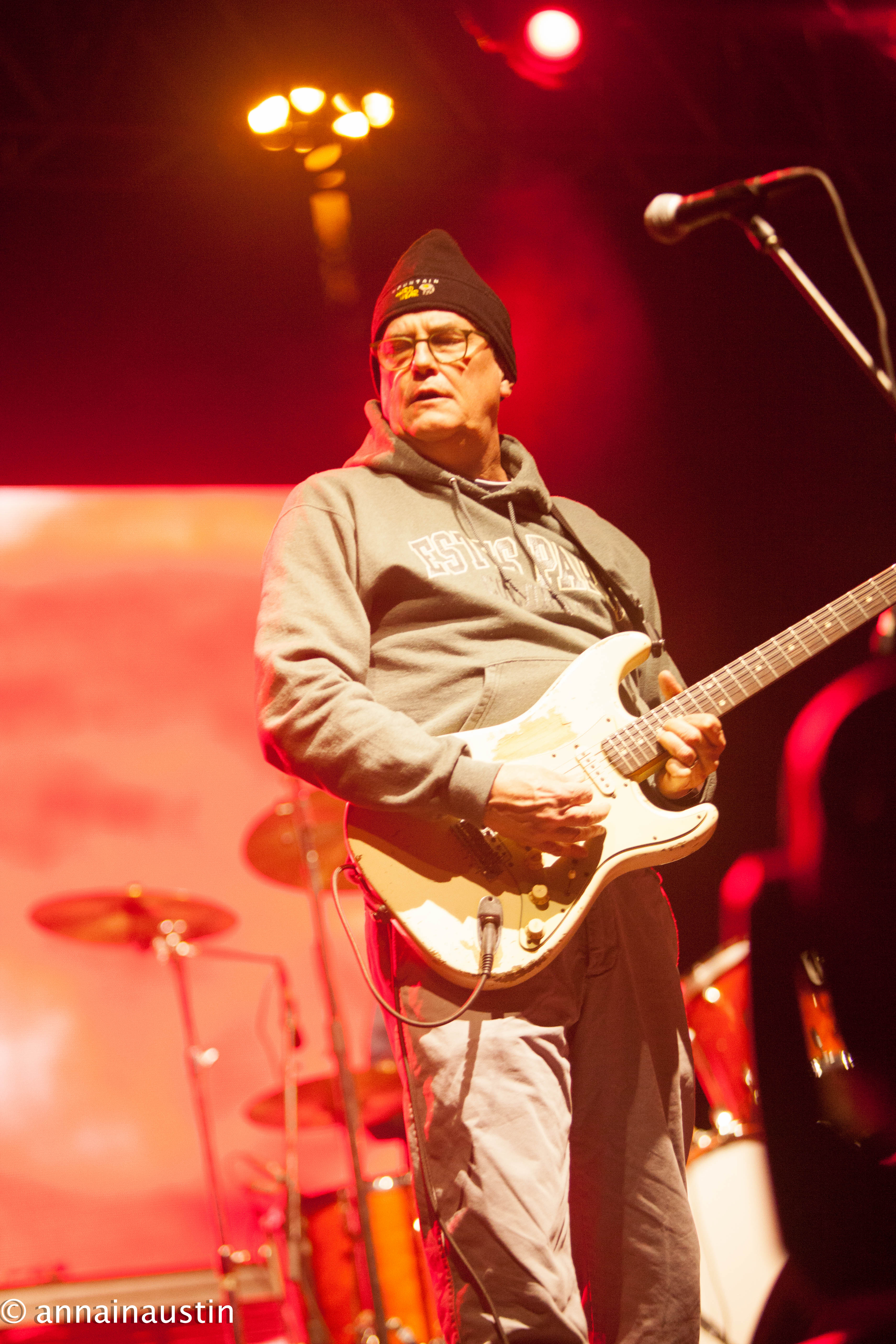
- Leary with Butthole Surfers in 2016

Background information
- Born: Paul Leary Walthall; May 7, 1957 (age 69); San Antonio, Texas, U.S.
- Genres: Alternative rock; punk rock; psychedelic rock; experimental rock; noise rock; hardcore punk; industrial metal
- Occupations: Musician; record producer
- Instruments: Guitar; keyboards
- Years active: 1981–present

Paul Leary Walthall (born May 7, 1957), known as Paul Leary, is an American musician and record producer from Austin, Texas, best known as the lead guitarist and occasional lead vocalist for the rock band Butthole Surfers. He is also the producer of a number of songs and albums by other bands, including U2, Sublime, Meat Puppets, Daniel Johnston, The Reverend Horton Heat, Pepper, Maggie Walters, Bad Livers, Slightly Stoopid, and The Refreshments. Leary produced Sublime with Rome's debut album, Yours Truly.

In 1991, Leary released a solo album entitled The History of Dogs. In 1994, he appeared on the song "Lounge Fly" from the multi-platinum album Purple by Stone Temple Pilots. He also performed backing vocals on the Meat Puppets and Bad Livers respective renditions of his song "Pee Pee the Sailor". Leary appeared on one track on the 1999 John Paul Jones (ex-Led Zeppelin) solo album Zooma. He formed a new band called The Cocky Bitches (formerly Carny) and in 2014 contributed three songs to the Melvins album Hold It In.

Leary released Born Stupid, his second solo album, on February 12, 2021, via Shimmy-Disc. He released a newly re-mastered LP of The History of Dogs as The History of Dogs, Revisted (with two additional bonus songs from the original 1990 sessions that were not included on the original LP) on June 17, 2022, also via Shimmy-Disc.
