= 2026 in rock music =

This article summarizes the events related to rock music for the year 2026.

== Notable events ==
=== January ===
- Alter Bridge releases their self-titled eighth studio album. It debuts in the top four of four separate national album charts.
- German thrash metal band Kreator releases their 16th studio album, Krushers of the World. It debuts in the top eight of four separate national album charts, including at number two in the German album charts.
- Megadeth releases their self-titled 17th and final studio album. It concludes with a newly recorded version of the song "Ride the Lightning", which Megadeth frontman Dave Mustaine originally co-wrote and released as a Metallica song when he was a member of the band. The gesture was meant to represent how his career had come full circle. It debuts in the top five of 15 separate national album charts and becomes their first album in their 40 years career to reach number one on the US Billboard 200, moving 73,000 album-equivalent units in its first week. It also tops the Australian albums chart for the first time in their career.

=== February ===
- The 68th Annual Grammy Awards were held on February 1, 2026. Turnstile wins Best Rock Album for Never Enough, and Best Metal Performance for their song "Birds". English rock band The Cure wins Best Alternative Music Album for Songs of a Lost World, and Best Alternative Music Performance for "Alone". Nine Inch Nails wins Best Rock Song for "As Alive as You Need Me to Be" and English musician Yungblud wins Best Rock Performance for his cover of "Changes" by Black Sabbath.
- Australian progressive rock band Karnivool releases their fourth studio album, In Verses. It is their first studio album in almost 13 years. Production on the album began as early as 2016, but had progressed slowly due to the band members becoming physically separate from each other. The album tops the Australian all-format ARIA albums chart upon its release. It is their second consecutive album to top the chart, after Asymmetry (2013).
- Green Day performs at the Super Bowl LX pre-game show. During it, frontman Billie Joe Armstrong gives an anti-ICE speech.

=== April ===
- Look Outside Your Window, an album featuring members of Slipknot, was released on April 18. It was recorded by four of the band's members in 2008, during the band's lengthy All Hope Is Gone sessions. The album has a more experimental and melodic rock sound as opposed to their traditional metal sound. The band once aimed to release it in 2023, once band members were scheduled from their record label contract. It was delayed to 2024, due to Corey Taylor's commitment to his second solo album CMF2 in the second half of 2023, and then again to 2025 and then 2026.

=== May ===
- Social Distortion releases their eighth studio album, Born to Kill. The band's follow-up to 2011's Hard Times and Nursery Rhymes was originally set for release in 2023, but frontman Mike Ness' diagnosis with stage one tonsil cancer delayed the album's release by three years. It debuts in the top six of four separate national album charts.
- English musician, and former Beatle, Paul McCartney releases his 19th solo studio album, The Boys of Dungeon Lane. In production for nearly five years, the successor to 2020's McCartney III includes new tracks and reworked compositions that had previously never been recorded or released. It debuts at the top of five separate national album charts.
- Shinedown releases their eighth studio album, Eight. The band had previously spent 2025 releasing singles from it, including "Three Six Five", "Dance, Kid, Dance", "Killing Fields", and "Searchlight". It debuts in the top eight of four separate national album charts.

=== June ===
- Evanescence releases their sixth studio album, Sanctuary. It is their first studio album in five years, since The Bitter Truth (2021). It debuts in the top eight of six separate national album charts.
- English rock band Muse releases their tenth studio album, The Wow! Signal. It is their first studio album in four years, since Will of the People (2022). It debuts at the top of eight separate national album charts.
- Sublime releases their fourth and final album, Until the Sun Explodes. It is the only album to feature vocals by Jakob Nowell, son of original vocalist, Bradley Nowell, who died in 1996, and had previously effectively ended the band's career outside of separate project Sublime with Rome.
- Butthole Surfers release their first studio album in twenty-five years, After the Astronaut. It was originally intended for release in 1998, as the successor to Electriclarryland (1996), but following record label politics, it was initially canceled and portions of the album were re-recorded in favor of Weird Revolution (2001).
- The Pretty Reckless releases their fifth studio album, Dear God. It is their first studio album in five years, since Death by Rock and Roll (2021). It debuts in the top seven of five separate national album charts.

=== July ===
- English rock band Deep Purple releases their 24th studio album, Splat!. It debuts in the top nine of eleven separate national album charts.
- English rock band The Rolling Stones release their 25th studio album, Foreign Tongues. It debuts at number one on the UK charts, their fifteenth album to do so. This ties them with the Beatles for most albums topping the chart, and puts them only behind Robbie Williams, who has charted sixteen number ones on the chart.
- Motionless in White releases their seventh studio album, Decades, their first studio album in 4 years, since Scoring the End of the World (2022). It debuts in the top seven of four separate national album charts.
- The Strokes release their seventh studio album, Reality Awaits. It was recorded in Costa Rica with producer Rick Rubin. It debuts in the top ten of seven separate national album charts.

=== August ===
- German electronicore band Electric Callboy releases their seventh studio album, Tanzneid. It debuts at the top of the German national album charts.
- Carly Simon releases her twenty-fourth studio album, Comes in Waves, her first studio album in 18 years.
- Mastodon releases their ninth studio album, Marrow Deep. It is their first studio album with lead guitarist Nick Johnston, following the death of original lead guitarist Brent Hinds in 2025. It debuts in the top eight of seven separate national album charts.
- Mexican rock band The Warning releases their fifth studio album, Everything's Falling. It debuts in the top nine of five separate national album charts.

=== September ===
- Anthrax releases their twelfth studio album, Cursum Perficio, their first in a decade, since For All Kings (2016). It debuts in the top 10 of 8 separate national album charts.
- Swedish rock band Europe releases their twelfth studio album, Come This Madness, their first in nine years, since Walk the Earth (2017). It debuts in the top 9 of 6 separate national album charts.

=== October ===
- Australian pop-punk band Stand Atlantic releases their fifth studio album, Godbreath. It is their first studio album in two years, since Was Here (2024). It debuts at the top of the Australian national album charts.

=== November ===
- Irish rock band U2 releases their 15th studio album, Carnaval de Luz. The album coincides with the band's 50th anniversary, and features a posthumous appearance from Dolly Parton, who died in August 2026. It debuts at the top of 10 separate national album charts.

== Albums released ==
=== January ===
Day	Artist	Album
9	Alter Bridge	Alter Bridge
9	The Cribs	Selling a Vibe
16	Kid Kapichi	Fearless Nature
16	Kreator	Krushers of the World
23	The Damned	Not Like Everybody Else
23	Goldfinger	Nine Lives
23	Megadeth	Megadeth
23	Poppy	Empty Hands
30	Buzzcocks	Attitude Adjustment
30	Joyce Manor	I Used to Go to This Bar
30	Trash Boat	Even If I Never Get There (EP)

=== February ===
Day	Artist	Album
6	Karnivool	In Verses
6	Puscifer	Normal Isn't
13	Sahara Hotnights	No One Ever Really Changes
13	Story of the Year	A.R.S.O.N.
18	U2	Days of Ash (EP)
20	New Found Glory	Listen Up!
27	Rob Zombie	The Great Satan

=== March ===
Day	Artist	Album
6	Morrissey	Make-Up Is a Lie
6	Squeeze	Trixies
13	The Black Crowes	A Pound of Feathers
20	Exodus	Goliath
20	Poison the Well	Peace in Place
20	Tedeschi Trucks Band	Future Soul
27	Black Label Society	Engines of Demolition
27	Lou Gramm	Released
27	Melissa Etheridge	Rise
27	Snail Mail	Ricochet

=== April ===
Day	Artist	Album
3	Good Kid	Can We Hang Out Sometime?
3	U2	Easter Lily (EP)
10	Metal Church	Dead to Rights
17	Nine Inch Noize	Nine Inch Noize
18	Corey Taylor, Jim Root, Shawn Crahan and Sid Wilson	Look Outside Your Window
24	Foo Fighters	Your Favorite Toy
24	Sepultura	The Cloud of Unknowing (EP)

=== May ===
Day	Artist	Album
1	The Black Keys	Peaches!
1	Sevendust	One
1	Toadies	The Charmer
8	Black Veil Brides	Vindicate
8	Neil Diamond	Wild at Heart
8	Social Distortion	Born to Kill
15	Peter Frampton	Carry the Light
22	Ed O'Brien	Blue Morpho
22	XCOMM	Time to Burn
29	Neil Young and the Chrome Hearts	As Time Explodes (live album)
29	Paul McCartney	The Boys of Dungeon Lane
29	Shinedown	Eight
29	The Who	Live at Eden Project (live album)

=== June ===
Day	Artist	Album
5	Evanescence	Sanctuary
12	Dirty Heads	7 Seas
12	Sleeping with Sirens	An Ending in Itself
12	Sublime	Until the Sun Explodes
12	Yes	Aurora
26	Butthole Surfers	After the Astronaut
26	Muse	The Wow! Signal
26	The Pretty Reckless	Dear God
26	Switchfoot	Forever Now

=== July ===
Day	Artist	Album
3	Deep Purple	Splat!
10	The Rolling Stones	Foreign Tongues
10	Trickfinger	In a Box (box set)
10	Trickfinger	Rotation
17	Foreigner	In the Eye of the Storm (soundtrack album)
17	Motionless in White	Decades
17	Quicksand	Bring On the Psychics
17	Tesla	Homage (covers album)
24	No Pressure	NP Style
24	The Strokes	Reality Awaits
31	Five Finger Death Punch	Legacy

=== August ===
Day	Artist	Album
7	Electric Callboy	Tanzneid
14	Carly Simon	Comes in Waves
14	Marilyn Manson	One Assassination Under God – Chapter 2
14	Saliva	Breaking Through
21	Weezer	Weezer (Gold Album)
28	Dinosaur Jr.	There Near
28	Interpol	This Mirror Weighs a Ton
28	The Linda Lindas	Gotta Get Out
28	Mastodon	Marrow Deep
28	The Warning	Everything's Falling
28	NOFX	40 Years of Fuckin' Up: Soundtrack + Score (Soundtrack)

=== September ===
Day	Artist	Album
4	Airbourne	Airbourne
4	Audrey Horne	Achilles
4	Mad Max	Stories of Destiny
4	Theory of a Deadman	Part 1: Funeral Songs (EP)
11	Bloc Party	Anatomy of a Brief Romance
18	Anthrax	Cursum Perficio
18	Beck	Ride Lonesome
18	Jesus Jones	Twilight
18	Neil Young and the Chrome Hearts	Second Song
18	Nonpoint	The Last World
18	Roger Taylor	Violence Insane in a Beautiful World
25	Europe	Come This Madness
25	Nothing But Thieves	Stray Dogs
25	The Ocean	Solaris
25	Soft Cell	Danceteria

=== October ===
Day	Artist	Album
2	Dead Poet Society	Monarch
2	The Paradox	Proceed with Caution (EP)
9	Greta Van Fleet	Palace for the People
9	Skillet	After the Storm (EP)
16	The Avalanches	No Bad Memories
23	The Snuts	Joy in Short Moments
23	Stand Atlantic	Godbreath
23	Tony Iommi	From the Dark
30	Fuel	Pendulum
30	Ministry	Hate to Go - Take Out or Delivery
30	Nickelback	Everything Under the Sun

=== November ===
Day	Artist	Album
6	Asia	Indigo
6	Cult of Luna	In the Shadow of Your Shadow
6	Hatebreed	Fatal Paradox
13	Royal Blood	Dead Company
13	U2	Carnaval de Luz
13	Walls of Jericho	System Error: Humanity
13	Wavves	Cherry Soda
20	Trivium	Crown in the Grave

== Future releases ==
- 27 November – English musician, and former Genesis frontman, Peter Gabriel is set to release his eleventh solo album, and ninth of original material, O\I. Like its predecessor I/O (2023), Gabriel released a new song every full moon as singles before releasing the album at the end of the year.
- 4 December – Starset are set to release their 6th studio album, Revelations.

=== Unknown dates ===
- Papa Roach is scheduled to release their twelfth studio album. Both singles released in advance of the album in 2025, "Even If It Kills Me", and "Braindead", topped the Billboard Mainstream Rock Airplay chart.
- Bruce Springsteen is scheduled to release a solo album in 2026.
- English neo-prog band Marillion is set to release their 21st studio album, their first since An Hour Before It's Dark (2022).
- Alice in Chains is scheduled to release their seventh studio album, their first in eight years following Rainier Fog in 2018. The band had originally hoped to be more active in 2025, but plans were put on hold due to undisclosed health issues of drummer Sean Kinney.
- Courtney Love is set to release a solo album in 2026, her first since America's Sweetheart in 2004.
- French heavy metal band Gojira is set to release their eighth studio album. It will be their first studio album since Fortitude in 2021, and since their live performance at the opening ceremony of the 2024 Summer Olympics in Paris, France.
- Steel Panther is set to release their seventh studio album, their first since On the Prowl in 2023. They began working on it in early 2025.
- Korn plans to release their fifteenth studio album. Members have stated that they aim to meld their "vintage" sound with a "modern twist", and that it would go into a heavier direction. The band concurrently plans on celebrating the 30th anniversary of their 1994 self-titled first album. It will also be their first album without original bassist Reginald "Fieldy" Arvizu, who left the band in 2021.
- Limp Bizkit is working on their seventh studio album, they started working on new material in 2024, during their touring schedules. It will also be their first studio album since the death of original bassist Sam Rivers, who died in October 2025.
- Former Rage Against the Machine guitarist Tom Morello is set to release his debut solo studio album. It is his first album after the band abruptly disbanded in early January 2024.
- Breaking Benjamin is scheduled to release their seventh studio album, their first since Ember (2018). Recording for the album began in the early 2020s.
- Incubus completed their ninth studio album in 2025, and is scheduled to release it sometime during 2026.
- Everclear is set to release their tenth studio album, their first in eleven years following Black Is the New Black in 2015.
- New York hardcore pioneers the Cro-Mags are set to release their seventh studio album, their first in six years following In the Beginning in 2020. It will also be their first studio album with drummer Pete Hines since Best Wishes in 1989, following his return to the band in September 2025.
- Murphy's Law is set to release their sixth studio album, their first in 25 years since The Party's Over in 2001. "Go, Jimmy, Go" was the first single released in advance of the album's release in October 2025.
- Soundgarden plans to release their seventh and final studio album, which will include the final recordings of frontman Chris Cornell, who died in 2017. The development of the album had faced multiple delays (including a dispute between the band and Cornell's estate handled by his wife Vicky, which was settled in 2023) before the surviving members began restarting work on it in 2025 with producer Terry Date.
- Candlebox is set to release their ninth studio album, their first in three years and their first since the band retired from touring in 2024.

== Tours and festivals ==
- Innings Festival was held from February 20 to February 22, 2026. It was headlined by Blink-182, Twenty One Pilots, and Mumford & Sons.
- Triumph's reunion tour, the Rock & Roll Machine Reloaded tour, began on April 10, 2026. It marked their first major tour with the original lineup of Mike Levine, Gil Moore and Rik Emmett together since the latter's departure from the band in 1988.
- Sick New World was held on April 25, 2026. It was headlined by System of a Down and Korn.
- Welcome to Rockville was held from May 7 to May 10, 2026. It was headlined by My Chemical Romance, and Bring Me the Horizon.
- Sonic Temple was held from May 14 to May 17, 2026. It was headlined by Tool, My Chemical Romance, Shinedown, and Bring Me the Horizon.
- Rush's reunion tour, the Fifty Something tour, began on June 7, 2026 at the Kia Forum in Los Angeles, California. It marked their first major tour in eleven years, and their first with drummer Anika Nilles filling in for the band's longtime drummer Neil Peart, who died in 2020, and Loren Gold as their keyboardist.
- Warped Tour was held in June, July, August, September, and is set to be held in November.
- Louder Than Life was held from September 17 to September 20, 2026. It was headlined by Iron Maiden and My Chemical Romance.

== Band breakups ==
- English post-hardcore band Svalbard disbanded after completing their farewell tour. The band also released one final song before disbanding. They performed their final live show at the ArcTanGent Festival on August 19, 2026.
- Brazilian heavy metal band Sepultura disbanded after completing their 40th anniversary farewell tour, and the release of their final EP, The Cloud of Unknowing, which was released on April 24, 2026. Their final show was held at the Pacaembu Stadium in São Paulo, Brazil on November 7, 2026.
- The Eagles are set to disband after completing their "Long Goodbye" farewell tour.

== Deaths ==
- January 10 – Bob Weir, 78, American rock guitarist and singer-songwriter (Grateful Dead)
- January 20 – Rob Hirst, 71, Australian rock drummer (Midnight Oil)
- January 22 – Francis Buchholz, 71, German hard rock and heavy metal bassist (Scorpions)
- January 28
  - Sly Dunbar, 73, Jamaican drummer (Sly and Robbie, Bob Dylan, The Rolling Stones)
  - Billy Bass Nelson, 74, American bassist (Parliament-Funkadelic)
- February 2 – Chuck Negron, 83, American rock singer-songwriter (Three Dog Night)
- February 5 – Fred Smith, 77, American rock bassist (Television)
- February 7
  - Brad Arnold, 47, American rock singer-songwriter (3 Doors Down)
  - Greg Brown, 56, American rock guitarist (Cake)
- February 14 – Tim Very, 42, American indie rock drummer (Manchester Orchestra)
- February 17 – Shinya Yamada, 56, Japanese rock drummer (Luna Sea)
- February 27 – Neil Sedaka, 86, American singer-songwriter
- March 2 – Mike Vernon, 81, English producer and record label owner (David Bowie, Fleetwood Mac, John Mayall & the Bluesbreakers)
- March 7 – Country Joe McDonald, 84, American psychedelic rock singer-songwriter (Country Joe and the Fish)
- March 9 – Tommy DeCarlo, 60, American rock singer (Boston)
- March 13 – Phil Campbell, 64, Welsh rock guitarist (Motörhead, Phil Campbell and the Bastard Sons)
- March 16 – Wayne Perkins, 74, American rock session guitarist (The Rolling Stones, Bob Marley, Joni Mitchell)
- March 23 – Shinichiro Sato, 61, Japanese rock drummer (The Pillows)
- March 25 – Dash Crofts, 87, American soft rock singer and guitarist (Seals & Crofts)
- March 26 – Ross the Boss, 72, American punk rock and heavy metal guitarist (Manowar, The Dictators)
- April 1 – Suki Lahav, 74, Israeli violinist (Bruce Springsteen and the E Street Band)
- April 19 – Dave Mason, 79, English singer-songwriter and guitarist (Traffic, Fleetwood Mac)
- May 11 – Jack Douglas, 80, American rock music producer (Aerosmith, Alice Cooper, Cheap Trick, Patti Smith, New York Dolls, John Lennon)
- May 17 – Ike Willis, 70, American guitarist and vocalist (Frank Zappa)
- May 22 – Dick Parry, 83, English saxophonist (Pink Floyd)
- June 14 – Oliver Tree, 32, American alternative rock musician
- June 17 – Walter Parazaider, 81, American woodwind musician (Chicago)
- June 22 – Clive Davis, 94, American record executive and producer
- July 18 – Jennifer Finch, 59, American rock bassist (L7)
- July 24 – Lou Koller, 59, American hardcore punk singer (Sick of It All)
- July 29 – Glen Hansard, 56, Irish folk rock musician (The Swell Season, The Frames)
- August 6 – Peter Katsis, 69, American talent manager (Korn, Bush, Fever 333, Limp Bizkit, The Smashing Pumpkins, Jane's Addiction)
- August 17 – Frank Beard, 77, American rock drummer (ZZ Top)
- September 5 – Andy Williams, 48, American metalcore guitarist and AEW wrestler (Every Time I Die)
- September 20 – Chad Gilbert, 45, American rock guitarist, record producer, and songwriter (New Found Glory)
- September 21 – Angry Anderson, 79, Australian rock singer-songwriter (Rose Tattoo)
- 1 October – Conrad "Cronos" Lant, 63, English heavy metal singer and bassist (Venom)
