= Butthole Surfers discography =

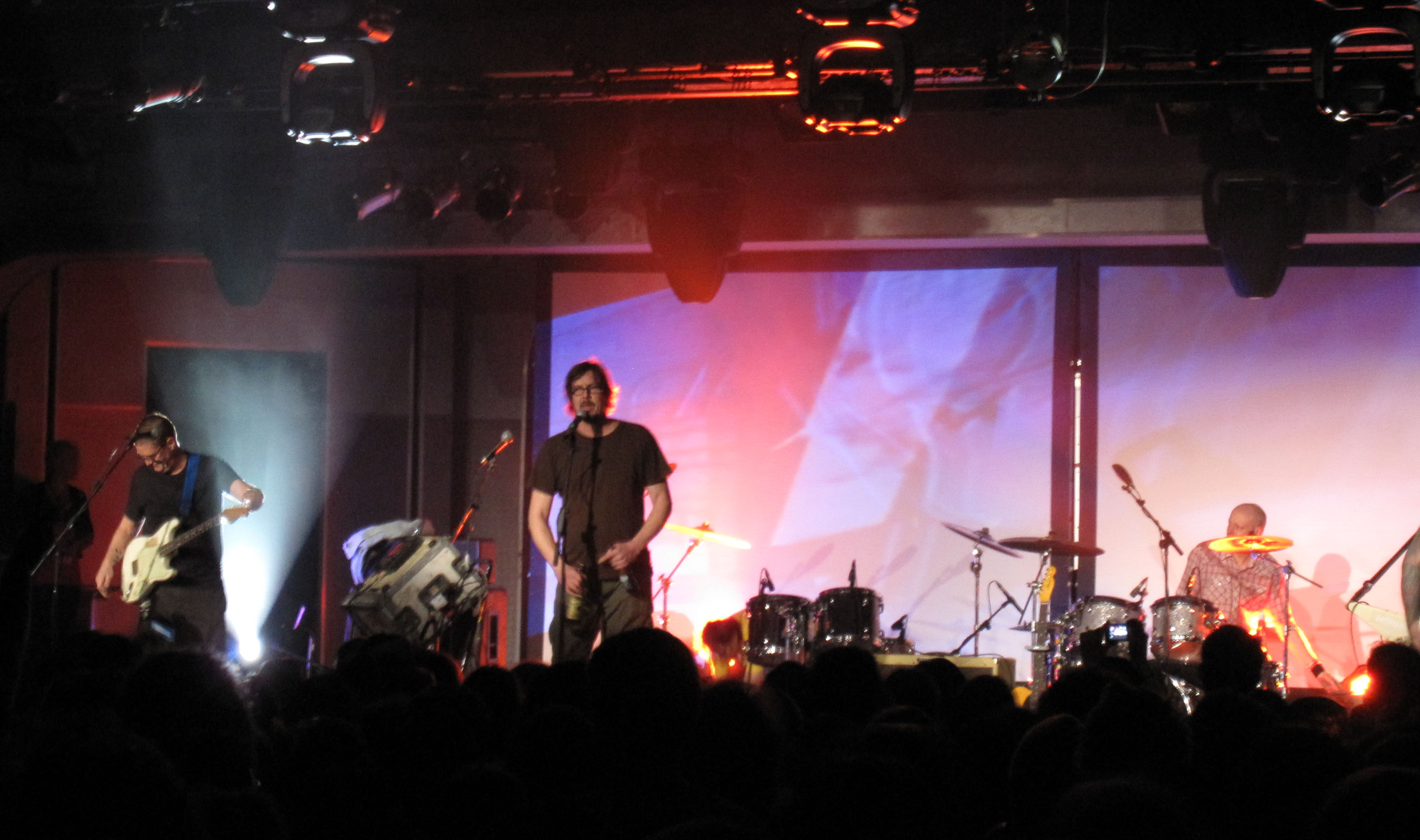
- Studio albums: 9
- Extended plays: 4
- Live albums: 2
- Compilation albums: 3
- Singles: 18
- Video albums: 1

The discography of American rock band Butthole Surfers consists of nine studio albums, four extended plays (EP), two live albums, three compilation albums, one video album, and eight singles. Formed by Gibby Haynes and Paul Leary in San Antonio, Texas, the group signed with the Alternative Tentacles label in 1981. Butthole Surfers' eponymous debut EP was released two years later. The band added drummers King Coffey and Teresa Nervosa in 1983, moved to the Touch and Go label the following year, and released their debut full-length album, Psychic... Powerless... Another Man's Sac.

== Albums ==
=== Studio albums ===
List of studio albums, with selected chart positions, sales, and certifications
Title	Album details	Peak chart positions						Certifications
Title	Album details	US	AUS	CAN	NZ	UK	UK Indie	Certifications
Psychic... Powerless... Another Man's Sac	Released: December 1984 (US); Labels: Touch and Go, Fundamental; Format: CD, cassette, LP	—	—	—	—	—	12	
Rembrandt Pussyhorse	Released: April 18, 1986 (US); Labels: Touch and Go, Red Rhino; Format: CD, CS, LP	—	—	—	—	—	9	
Locust Abortion Technician	Released: March 1987 (US); Labels: Touch and Go, Blast First; Format: CD, CS, LP	—	—	—	—	—	3	
Hairway to Steven	Released: April 11, 1988 (US); Labels: Touch and Go, Blast First; Format: CD, CS, LP	—	—	—	—	—	6	
piouhgd	Released: February 20, 1991 (US); Labels: Rough Trade; Format: CD, CS, LP	—	136	—	—	68	—	
Independent Worm Saloon	Released: March 23, 1993 (US); Labels: Capitol; Format: CD, CS, LP	154	179	—	—	73	—	
Electriclarryland	Released: April 2, 1996 (US); Labels: Capitol; Format: CD, CS, LP	31	23	61	24	—	—	RIAA: Gold
Weird Revolution	Released: August 28, 2001 (US); Labels: Surfdog, Hollywood; Format: CD, LP	130	124	—	—	—	—	
"—" denotes releases that did not chart.

=== Archival albums ===
List of archival albums
Title	Details
After the Astronaut	Released: June 26, 2026 (US); Labels: Sunset Blvd; Format: CD, LP; Originally recorded in the late 1990s, but was cancelled, although the majority of the songs were slightly reworked for 2001's Weird Revolution.

=== Live albums ===
List of live albums, with selected chart positions
Title	Live album details	Peak chart positions
Title	Live album details	UK Indie
Live PCPPEP	Released: September 20, 1984 (US); Labels: Alternative Tentacles; Format: 12"	—
Double Live	Released: June 1989 (US); Labels: Touch and Go, Fundamental; Format: CD, CS, LP	4
Live at the Leatherfly	Released: May 2025 (US); Labels: Sunset Blvd Records; Format: LP	—
"—" denotes releases that did not chart.

=== Compilation albums ===
List of compilation albums
Title	Compilation album details
The Hole Truth... and Nothing Butt	Released: March 28, 1995 (US); Labels: Trance Syndicate; Format: CD
Humpty Dumpty LSD	Released: July 11, 2002 (US); Labels: Latino Buggerveil; Format: CD, LP
Butthole Surfers/Live PCPPEP	Released: January 28, 2003 (US); Labels: Latino Buggerveil; Format: CD

=== Video albums ===
List of video albums
Title	Video album details
Blind Eye Sees All	Released: June 1986; Label: Touch and Go; Formats: VHS, DVD (2002)

== Extended plays ==
List of extended plays, with selected chart positions
Title	Extended play details	Peak chart positions
Title	Extended play details	UK Indie
Butthole Surfers	Released: July 1983 (US); Labels: Alternative Tentacles; Format: 12"	21
Cream Corn from the Socket of Davis	Released: October 1985 (UK); Labels: Touch and Go, Fundamental; Format: 12"	9
Widowermaker	Released: September 6, 1989 (US); Labels: Touch and Go, Blast First; Format: 12", 10", CD	1
The Hurdy Gurdy Man	Released: November 16, 1990 (US); Labels: Rough Trade; Format: 12"	—
"—" denotes releases that did not chart.

== Singles ==
Year	Title	Peak chart positions							Album
Year	Title	US Air	US Alt	US Main	AUS	CAN Alt	NZ	UK	Album
1985	"American Woman"	—	—	—	—	—	—	—	Non-album single
1990	"The Hurdy Gurdy Man"	—	—	—	147	—	36	98	piouhgd
1990	"Lonesome Bulldog"	—	—	—	—	—	—	—	piouhgd
1993	"Who Was in My Room Last Night?"	—	24	—	—	—	—	—	Independent Worm Saloon
1994	"Dust Devil"	—	—	—	—	—	—	—	Independent Worm Saloon
1994	"Good King Wenceslas"	—	—	—	—	—	—	—	Non-album single
1996	"Pepper"	26	1	19	15	2	32	59	Electriclarryland
1996	"Jingle of a Dog's Collar"	—	—	—	130	—	—	—	Electriclarryland
1996	"Whatever (I Had A Dream)"	—	—	—	—	—	—	—	Romeo + Juliet (soundtrack)
2001	"The Shame of Life"	—	24	—	147	—	—	—	Weird Revolution
2002	"Dracula from Houston"	—	—	—	172	—	—	—	Weird Revolution
2024	"I Hate My Job (Take One)"	—	—	—	—	—	—	—	Non-album singles
2024	"Locust Abortion Technician Medley"	—	—	—	—	—	—	—	Non-album singles
2024	"Gary Floyd (Peel Session)"	—	—	—	—	—	—	—	Non-album singles
2025	"The Annoying Song (Live)"	—	—	—	—	—	—	—	Live at the Leather Fly
2025	"Human Cannonball (Live)"	—	—	—	—	—	—	—	Live at the Leather Fly
2025	"You Don't know Me (Live)	—	—	—	—	—	—	—	Live at the Leather Fly
2026	"Jet Fighter"	—	—	—	—	—	—	—	After the Astronaut
2026	"Imbuya"	—	—	—	—	—	—	—	After the Astronaut
2026	"Intelligent Guy"	—	—	—	—	—	—	—	After the Astronaut
"—" denotes singles that did not chart.

=== Promotional singles ===
Year	Title	Peak chart positions							Album
Year	Title	US Air	US Alt	US Main	AUS	CAN Alt	NZ	UK	Album
1993	"You Don't Know Me"	—	—	—	—	—	—	—	Independent Worm Saloon
1993	"The Wooden Song"	—	—	—	—	—	—	—	Independent Worm Saloon
1996	"TV Star"	—	—	—	—	—	—	—	Electriclarryland
1996	"Cough Syrup"	—	—	—	—	—	—	—	Electriclarryland

== Compilation and soundtrack contributions ==
Year	Title	Track(s)	Label
1983	Cottage Cheese from the Lips of Death	"I Hate My Job"	Ward-9
1984	International P.E.A.C.E. Benefit Compilation	"100 Million People Dead"	R Radical
1984	Rat Music for Rat People Vol. 2	"Butthole Surf Theme Song"	CD Presents
1985	Tellus #10: All Guitars	"U.S.S.A." (Live)	Harvestworks
1986	God's Favorite Dog	"Eindhoven Chicken Masque" "The Legless Eye"	Touch and Go
1987	A Texas Trip	"All Day" "Flame Grape"	Caroline
1987	Smack My Crack	"Boiled Dove"	Giorno Poetry Systems
1989	Nothing Short of Total War	"Jimi" (Live)	Blast First
1990	Where the Pyramid Meets the Eye: A Tribute to Roky Erickson	"Earthquake"	Sire
1993	Volume Eight	"Who Was in My Room Last Night?" (Tate Or Tot Mix)	Volume magazine
1993	Son in Law: From the Original Motion Picture Soundtrack	"Who Was in My Room Last Night?"	Hollywood
1994	Brainscan: Music from the Motion Picture	"Leave Me Alone"	Ruffhouse/Columbia
1994	Love & A .45: Music from the Motion Picture	"Who Was in My Room Last Night?"	Epic Soundtrax
1994	Dumb And Dumber: Original Motion Picture Soundtrack	"Hurdy Gurdy Man"	RCA
1995	Saturday Morning	"Underdog"	MCA
1995	¡Cinco Años!	"The Lord Is a Monkey" (Remix)	Trance Syndicate
1996	Original Soundtrack from Fox Hunt	"The Colored F.B.I. Guy"	Rhino
1996	Music from And Inspired By John Carpenter's Escape from L.A.	"Pottery"	Lava
1996	William Shakespeare's Romeo + Juliet: Music from the Motion Picture	"Whatever (I Had a Dream)"	Capitol
1996	Beavis and Butt-Head Do America: Original Motion Picture Soundtrack	"The Lord Is a Monkey" (Rock Version)	Geffen
1997	Spawn: The Album	"Tiny Rubberband" (with/feat. Moby)	Immortal/Epic/Sony
1997	subUrbia: Original Motion Picture Soundtrack	"Human Cannonball"	Geffen
1998	Cult Rockers: Rebels	"Alcohol"	
1999	M.O.M., Vol. 3: Music for Our Mother Ocean	"Summer in the City" Remix of "Ocean Size" (Jane's Addiction)	Surfdog/Hollywood
2000	Mission: Impossible II (soundtrack)	"They Came In"	Hollywood
2002	Music from Scrubs	"Dracula from Houston"	Hollywood
2003	Laurel Canyon: Original Soundtrack	"The Shame of Life"	Hollywood
2004	Left of the Dial: Dispatches from the '80s Underground	"Moving to Florida"	Rhino
2004	Step Into Liquid: Original Motion Picture Soundtrack	"Dracula from Houston"	Surfdog

=== Music videos ===
Year	Title	Director
1987	"Cherub"	Alex Halpern & Tom Stern
1988	"Fast"	Alex Winter
1990	"The Hurdy Gurdy Man"	
1993	"Who Was in My Room Last Night?"	William Stobaugh
1993	"Dust Devil"	Modi Frank
1995	"Underdog"	
1996	"Pepper"	Gavin Bowden
2001	"The Shame of Life"	Kyle Cooper
