= Was Here =

Was Here may refer to:

- Was Here (Shape Shifters album)
- Was Here (Stand Atlantic album), 2024
- Was Here (Subtle album)

== See also ==
- Kilroy was here
