= F.E.A.R. (Stand Atlantic album) =

Studio album by Stand Atlantic
- Released: 6 May 2022
- Length: 36:46
- Label: Hopeless Records
- Producers: Stevie Knight; Stand Atlantic

Stand Atlantic chronology
Pink Elephant (2020)	F.E.A.R. (2022)	Was Here (2024)

Singles from F.E.A.R.
- 1. "Deathwish" Released: 29 April 2021; 2. "Molotov [ok]" Released: 5 November 2021; 3. "Pity Party" Released: 14 January 2022; 4. "Hair Out" Released: 2 March 2022

F.E.A.R. (an acronym for Fuck Everything and Run) is the third studio album from Australian pop-punk group Stand Atlantic. The album was announced in January 2022 and released on 6 May 2022. It peaked at number 10 on the ARIA charts, becoming their first top ten charting release.

At the 2022 J Awards, the album was nominated for Australian Album of the Year.

== Reception ==
Lili Jean Berry from The Music gave the album 4/5 and said "Overall this record is a huge sonic step up for the band. Every track slaps super hard. There is no chill moments, it' s just smacking you with bangers from start to finish. Old fans and yet to be made fan's will be talking about this one for a while."

Aliya Chaudhry from Kerrang! gave the album 4/5 and said "From start to finish, F.E.A.R. shocks and thrills" adding "It's an album that captures the mental strain of the past two years as the lyrics navigate trying to keep it together in an increasingly chaotic and challenging world. Stand Atlantic deftly harness it all into a cohesive album."

Elliot Grimmie form Noizze gave the album 9/10 saying "F.E.A.R. is a bombastic, proud bundle of perfect chaos. Every moment feels like it could have been both meticulously planned, or thrown in last minute for the hell of it; it sounds incredible from the beginning and until to the very end."

== Track listing ==
F.E.A.R. track listing
No.	Title	Length
1.	"Doomsday"	3:03
2.	"Pity Party" (featuring Royal & the Serpent)	2:41
3.	"Van Gogh"	3:05
4.	"Dumb" (featuring Tom the Mail Man)	2:44
5.	"Hair Out"	2:40
6.	"Deathwish" (featuring Nothing,Nowhere)	2:27
7.	"Switchblade"	2:38
8.	"Nails from the Back"	2:41
9.	"Bloodclot"	3:20
10.	"Don't Talk [to Me]"	2:23
11.	"Xo"	2:51
12.	"Cabin Fever"	3:11
13.	"Molotov [ok]"	2:16
14.	"I Wonder What Kind of Garlic Bread They Have at Mensa"	0:40
Total length:		36:46

== Personnel ==
Stand Atlantic

- Bonnie Fraser – lead vocals, rhythm guitar
- David Potter – lead guitar, keyboard
- Miki Rich – bass guitar
- Jonno Panichi – drums

Additional musicians

- Royal & the Serpent – guest vocals (on "Pity Party")
- Tom the Mail Man – guest vocals (on "Dumb")
- Nothing,Nowhere – guest vocals (on "Deathwish")

Production

- Stevie Knight – production

== Charts ==
Weekly chart performance for F.E.A.R.
Chart (2022)	Peak position
Australian Albums (ARIA)	10
Scottish Albums (Official Charts)	35
UK Independent Albums (Official Charts)	16
