= Backline =

Backline may refer to:

- Backline (football), position in Australian rules football and rugby
- Backline (stage), instruments and amplifiers at the back of a stage
