= Cough Syrup =

Cough syrup is medicine used to treat the common cold.

Cough Syrup may also refer to:

- "Cough Syrup" (song), by Young the Giant
- "Cough Syrup", a song by Kangta
- "Cough Syrup", a song by Butthole Surfers from the album Electriclarryland
