= Stand Atlantic =

Australian pop-punk band

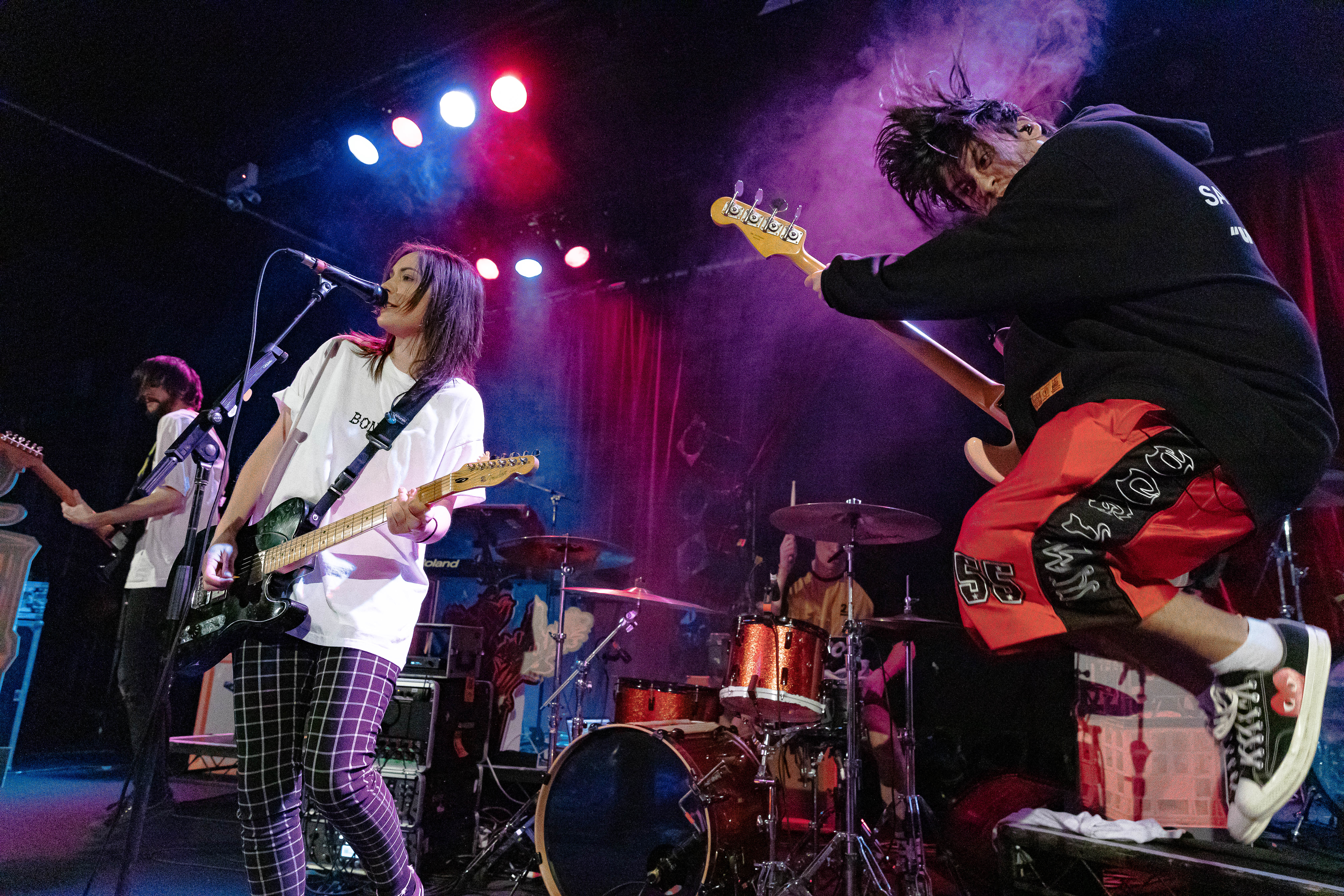
- Stand Atlantic performing at The Metro Theatre in 2019

Background information
- Also known as: What It's Worth (2012–2014)
- Origin: Sydney, New South Wales, Australia
- Genre: Pop-punk
- Years active: 2012–present
- Labels: Rude; Hopeless; Virgin Music Group
- Members: Bonnie Fraser; David Potter; Miki Rich; Jonno Panichi
- Past members: Arthur Ng; Jordan Jansons

Stand Atlantic are an Australian pop-punk band from Sydney, formed in 2012, consisting of vocalist/rhythm guitarist Bonnie Fraser, lead guitarist David Potter, bassist Miki Rich, and drummer Jonno Panichi. The band gained prominence in the Australian music scene with the release of their demo EPs, Catalyst (2013) and A Place Apart (2015). Ever since signing with Hopeless Records in September 2018, they have released five studio albums, Skinny Dipping (2018), Pink Elephant (2020), F.E.A.R. (2022), Was Here (2024), and Godbreath (2026).

== History ==
=== 2012–2013: Formation as What It's Worth ===
In 2012, friends Bonnie Fraser (lead vocals/rhythm guitar) and Arthur Ng (lead guitar), joined by David Potter (bass) and Jordan Jansons (drums) formed a band under the name What It's Worth. The four-piece pop punk band began recording material, and released their debut single, "Bulletproof Vest" in December 2012. In May 2013, they released their debut demo EP, Catalyst via physical and online platforms, followed by the release of their next single, "Romeo". It was accompanied by two national tours of Australia in support of their debut EP.

=== 2014–2017: Stand Atlantic and early EPs ===
In early 2014, the group changed their name from What It's Worth to Stand Atlantic. The band released their first single under the new name, "Breakaway", featuring the band's new sound, in March 2014. It was accompanied by a fan-made lyric video. Stand Atlantic returned to the studio during November 2014, working on their next demo EP, A Place Apart. During this time Jansons left the band and was replaced by Ethan Mestroni. The first single, "Wasteland", was released in April 2015 with the full EP later the same month. The EP was recorded by Rohan Kumar and mixed by Dave Petrovic. The band toured with As It Is, State Champs, and Young Lions during 2015.

In 2016, the band toured with With Confidence before joining Cute Is What We Aim For on their tenth anniversary tour of The Same Old Blood Rush with a New Touch album. It was also announced that the band were to play at Bondi-Blitz. They released a cover of Ariana Grande's "Break Free" on Ghost Killer Entertainment in June 2016. In September 2016, the band announced via a Facebook post, that Ng had chosen to leave the band. The post also included news that they were working on new music with Stevie Knight. On 21 June 2017, Stand Atlantic announced they had signed to Rude Records, becoming the first Australian band to do so. The band announced later that day that their first single from the new EP, "Coffee at Midnight", would be premiered on Triple J that night. The EP Sidewinder was released on 15 September 2017. In October 2017, Stand Atlantic announced they would be supporting ROAM on their European and UK tours. The group supported Knuckle Puck on their January 2018 Australian tour. Stand Atlantic's EP, Sidewinder, made 10th place on Rock Sound's Top 50 Albums of 2017.

=== 2018–2022: Skinny Dipping, Pink Elephant, and F.E.A.R. ===
In September 2018, Stand Atlantic announced that they had signed to Hopeless Records and released the single "Lavender Bones". Their debut studio album, Skinny Dipping, was released in October 2018. On 5 July 2019, Stand Atlantic announced Miki Rich as a permanent member of the band, after he had been touring with them as their bassist since 2017. In September 2019, they released the single "Hate Me (Sometimes)". In February 2020, Stand Atlantic released the single "Shh!", which was followed by "Drink to Drown" in April 2020, and "Wavelength" in May 2024. Their second studio album, Pink Elephant, was released on 7 August 2020. Pink Elephant debuted at number 23 on the ARIA Albums Chart.

On 29 April 2021, the band released "Deathwish", a track which featured Nothing,Nowhere, along with an accompanying music video. This was followed in September 2021, with "Superglue" featuring Birds of Tokyo. On 4 November 2021, they released "Molotov (OK)", with an accompanying music video. Fraser said of the song's themes that "I went to a Christian school for 3 years of my life and when a pastor says 'all gays will burn in hell' during an assembly, you're gonna remember it, and you're gonna write a song about it." In January 2022, the group released "Pity Party" with Royal & the Serpent as the lead single from their album F.E.A.R., which followed on 6 May 2022.

=== 2023–2025: Was Here ===
On 3 February 2023, the band released single "kill[H]er", a track about how "Self-sabotage is a bitch. Self-doubt kills and denying good and genuine parts of yourself because you’ve been conditioned to think they’re not good enough is a form of murder. It's a reminder to myself not to give in to that shit. Personal growth is important but don't deny who you are. Sometimes I find myself thinking back to who I used to be and missing that person." Was Here was released on 23 August 2024. The album reached number 12 on the UK Rock & Metal Chart.

=== 2026: Godbreath ===
In July 2026, the group announced the release of their fifth studio album Godbreath, and first on Virgin Music Group. It was released on October 23, 2026, and on October 30th, debuted at #1 on the ARIA Album Chart becoming the groups first album to reach #1 in Australia.

== Musical style and influences ==
Will Cross of Rock Sound, reviewing Stand Atlantic's EP Sidewinder, wrote: "the trio have created an EP that's assured, accessible and properly brilliant." Caitlin Olsen of amnplify, reviewing the same EP, wrote: "the EP throws back to mid-2000s pop punk with a contemporary alternative twist. It's tight, it's soulful, and it's loaded with grit."

The band has stated influences from bands and artists such as Blink-182, The Story So Far, Justin Bieber, Silverchair, The 1975, and Moose Blood.

== Members ==
Current

- Bonnie Fraser – vocals, rhythm guitar (2012–present)
- David Potter – lead guitar, keyboards (2017–present), bass guitar (2012–2017)
- Jonno Panichi – drums (2015–present)
- Miki Rich – bass guitar (2019–present, touring 2017–2019)

Former

- Arthur Ng – lead guitar (2012–2016)
- Jordan Jansons – drums (2012–2014)

Touring musicians

- Ethan Mestroni – drums (2014–2015)
- Will Robinson – lead guitar (2016–2017)

Timeline

== Discography ==
=== Studio albums ===
List of studio albums, with release date and label shown
Title	Details	Peak chart positions		
Title	Details	AUS	SCO	UK Ind.
Skinny Dipping	Released: 26 October 2018; Label: Hopeless; Formats: CD, vinyl, digital download	—	—	30
Pink Elephant	Released: 7 August 2020; Label: Hopeless; Formats: CD, vinyl, digital download	23	29	8
F.E.A.R.	Released: 6 May 2022; Label: Hopeless; Formats: CD, vinyl, digital download	10	35	16
Was Here	Released: 23 August 2024; Label: Hopeless; Formats: CD, vinyl, digital download	3	38	22
Godbreath	Released: 23 October 2026; Label: Virgin Music Group; Formats: CD, vinyl, digital download	1	—	—
"—" denotes a recording that did not chart or was not released in that territory.

=== Extended plays ===
Title	Details
Catalyst (as What It's Worth)	Released: 8 May 2013; Label: Self-released; Formats: CD, digital download
A Place Apart	Released: 14 April 2015; Label: Self-released; Formats: CD, vinyl, digital download
Sidewinder	Released: 15 September 2017; Label: Rude (RDR140-1); Formats: CD, vinyl, digital download

=== Singles ===
List of singles, showing release year, certification, and album
Title	Year	Certifications	Album
"Bulletproof Vest" (as What It's Worth)	2012		Catalyst
"Romeo" (as What It's Worth)	2013		Catalyst
"Breakaway"	2014		Non-album single
"Wasteland"	2015		A Place Apart
"Coffee at Midnight"	2017		Sidewinder
"Mess I Made"	2017		Sidewinder
"Sidewinder"	2017		Sidewinder
"Lavender Bones"	2018		Skinny Dipping
"Lost My Cool"	2018		Skinny Dipping
"Skinny Dipping"	2018		Skinny Dipping
"Your Graduation"	2018		Non-album singles
"MakeDamnSure"	2019		Non-album singles
"Hate Me (Sometimes)"	2019		Pink Elephant
"Shh!"	2020		Pink Elephant
"Drink to Drown"	2020		Pink Elephant
"Wavelength"	2020		Pink Elephant
"Jurassic Park"	2020		Pink Elephant
"Blurry"	2020		Pink Elephant
"I'm Sorry" (with Mokita)	2020		Non-album single
"Deathwish" (featuring Nothing,Nowhere)	2021	ARIA: Platinum	F.E.A.R.
"Molotov (OK)"	2021		F.E.A.R.
"Pity Party" (featuring Royal & the Serpent)	2022		F.E.A.R.
"Hair Out"	2022		F.E.A.R.
"Kill(h)er"	2023		Was Here
"Sex on the Beach"	2023		Was Here
"Warz0ne"	2024		Was Here
"Girl$" (featuring Lynn Gunn of Pvris and Bruses)	2024		Was Here
"Love U Anyway"	2024		Was Here
"Criminal" (featuring Jamie Hails of Polaris)	2024		Was Here
"Frenemies"	2024		Was Here
"I'm the Man" (featuring Lauren Sanderson)	2025		Was Here (Deluxe)
"Velcro"	2026		Godbreath
"Lucid"	2026		Godbreath
"Edge of Vegas"	2026		Godbreath
"Next2U"	2026		Godbreath
"So Cool"	2026		Godbreath

==== As featured artist ====
Title	Year	Album
"Superglue" (Birds of Tokyo featuring Stand Atlantic)	2021	Non-album single
"My Friends" (No Love for the Middle Child featuring Zero 9:36 and Stand Atlantic)	2022	Say It Like You Mean It
"Hanging On to Thunder" (Bad Wolves featuring Stand Atlantic)	2025	Die About It (Deluxe)

== Awards and nominations ==
=== J Awards ===
The J Awards are an annual series of Australian music awards that were established by the Australian Broadcasting Corporation's youth-focused radio station Triple J. They commenced in 2005.

Year	Nominee / work	Award	Result	Ref.
2022	Australian Album of the Year	F.E.A.R.	Nominated	
