= Skinny Dipping (album) =

Studio album by Stand Atlantic
- Released: 26 October 2018
- Length: 33:15
- Label: Hopeless
- Producer: Stevie Knight

Stand Atlantic chronology
Sidewinder (2017)	Skinny Dipping (2018)	Pink Elephant (2020)

Singles from Skinny Dipping
- 1. "Lavender Bones" Released: 5 September 2018; 2. "Lost My Cool" Released: 3 October 2018; 3. "Skinny Dipping" Released: 26 October 2018

Skinny Dipping is the debut studio album from Australian pop-punk group Stand Atlantic. The album was announced on 5 September, alongside the release of the lead single title track. The album was the first on Hopeless Records and released on 26 October 2018.

== Reception ==
Triple J said "Dripping in 90s throwbacks, Skinny Dipping speaks to the heart on every track. Vocalist and guitarist Bonnie Fraser addresses universal truths such as young love, self-doubt, vulnerability and joy."

Thomas from Punk Rock Theory said "The unfiltered honesty of the album's 10 tracks showcases an emotional maturity beyond Stand Atlantic's collective years, a keen sense of self-awareness and desire to be unconditionally authentic even when – and perhaps especially when – it breaks their hearts."

== Track listing ==
Skinny Dipping track listing
No.	Title	Length
1.	"Lavender Bones"	3:24
2.	"Bullfrog"	3:01
3.	"Skinny Dipping"	2:50
4.	"Speak Slow"	3:09
5.	"Cigarette Kiss"	3:40
6.	"Lost My Cool"	3:25
7.	"Toothpick"	3:35
8.	"Burn in the Afterthought"	3:44
9.	"Clay" (featuring Hannah Hermione Greenwood)	2:34
10.	"Roses"	3:54
Total length:		33:04

== Charts ==
Weekly chart performance for Skinny Dipping
Chart (2018)	Peak position
UK Independent Albums (Official Charts)	30
