= Pink Elephant (Stand Atlantic album) =

Studio album by Stand Atlantic
- Released: 7 August 2020
- Length: 33:08
- Label: Hopeless Records
- Producers: Courtney Ballard, Stevie Knight

Stand Atlantic chronology
Skinny Dipping (2018)	Pink Elephant (2020)	F.E.A.R. (2022)

Singles from Pink Elephant
- 1. "Hate Me (Sometimes)" Released: 16 September 2019; 2. "Shh!" Released: 13 February 2020; 3. "Drink to Drown" Released: 1 April 2020; 4. "Wavelength" Released: 13 May 2020; 5. "Jurassic Park" Released: 24 June 2020; 6. "Blurry" Released: 5 August 2020

Pink Elephant is the second studio album from Australian pop-punk group Stand Atlantic. The album was announced in June 2020 alongside its fifth single and released in August 2020. It peaked at number 23 on the ARIA charts.

== Reception ==
Emily Young from Square One Magazine gave the album 4/5 and said "Stand Atlantic have a lot to live up to with their sophomore album, Pink Elephant. With their typical sound and metaphorical lyrics, Stand Atlantic prove that they knew exactly who they wanted to be, and nailed it".

Jake Richardson from Kerrang! gave the album 3/5 and described the album as "a competent offering of well-crafted poppy rock songs, albeit with the odd dud thrown in." Richardson added "Stand Atlantic are at their best on this record when the energy levels are high, something evidenced by the likes of 'Eviligo', 'DWYW' and the sunny rocker that is 'Soap'."

== Track listing ==
Pink Elephant track listing
No.	Title	Length
1.	"Like That"	2:57
2.	"Shh!"	2:38
3.	"Blurry"	2:47
4.	"Jurassic Park"	2:26
5.	"Eviligo"	3:06
6.	"Wavelength"	2:58
7.	"Drink to Drown"	3:16
8.	"DWYW"	3:08
9.	"Silk & Satin"	2:50
10.	"Soap"	3:05
11.	"Hate Me (Sometimes)"	3:53
Total length:		33:04

== Charts ==
Weekly chart performance for Pink Elephant
Chart (2020)	Peak position
Australian Albums (ARIA)	23
Scottish Albums (Official Charts)	29
UK Independent Albums (Official Charts)	8
