= Ensenada (song) =

2025 single by Sublime

Single by Sublime

from the album Until the Sun Explodes
- Released: July 18, 2025
- Recorded: 2025
- Studio: Harbor Martyr Studios (San Pedro, California)
- Genre: Reggae rock
- Length: 2:34
- Label: SVN/BVRNT; Regime; Create
- Songwriters: Jakob Nowell; Eric Wilson; Bud Gaugh; Zane Vandevort; Jon Joseph
- Producer: Jon Joseph

Sublime singles chronology
"Garden Grove" (2025)	"Ensenada" (2025)	"Until the Sun Explodes" (2026)

Music video
- "Ensenada" on YouTube

"Ensenada" is a song by American ska punk band Sublime. It was officially released on July 18, 2025, as the lead single from their fourth studio album Until the Sun Explodes (2026). It is the band's first fully original single under the Sublime name since 1997's "Doin' Time" and features new lead vocalist Jakob Nowell, the son of founding frontman Bradley Nowell, who died in 1996.

"Ensenada" became Sublime's first radio hit in almost 30 years, reaching the number-one spot on the Billboard Alternative Airplay chart, which the band last achieved with "What I Got" in 1996. It is their longest-lasting No. 1 song, surpassing the three weeks spent by "What I Got" at the top, and broke the record for the greatest amount of time between No. 1 singles by one artist on the chart, with a gap of 28 years and 10 months. Spending 28 weeks at No. 1 on the Rock & Alternative Airplay chart, it broke the record for the most weeks at No. 1 previously set by Imagine Dragons' "Radioactive" in 2013.

== Composition and lyrics ==
The song is about a man who breaks up with his girlfriend in favor of prostitutes, with the chorus lyric "I don't want to be your man no more, I want to make love to a whore." Pitchfork wrote that Jakob Nowell and his father are the only two musicians who could draw pathos from that line. Jakob Nowell said that the lyric was not meant to be taken literally and represents "feelings of wanting to detach from reality," also noting that the band wanted to make themselves laugh by writing funny lyrics for the song.

== Critical reception ==
Margaret Farrell of Stereogum described "Ensenada" as sounding "like classic Sublime," calling it a "liberating sleazeball summer anthem". The Daily Nexus opined that the single was "already a quintessential Sublime track: fun, irreverent and a little unfinished."

== Music video ==
The music video for "Ensenada" showcases the band at various live performances intertwined with clips from studio sessions and depicting images associated with Sublime, including the Sun logo and an inflatable figure resembling Lou Dog, the Dalmatian owned by Bradley Nowell and a mascot for the group. As the song closes out, a photo of an infant Jakob Nowell being held by his parents is displayed.

== Charts ==
=== Weekly charts ===
Weekly chart performance for "Ensenada"
Chart (2025–2026)	Peak position
Canada Mainstream Rock (Billboard Canada)	4
Canada Modern Rock (Billboard Canada)	17
US Hot Rock & Alternative Songs (Billboard)	37
US Rock & Alternative Airplay (Billboard)	1

=== Year-end charts ===
Year-end chart performance for "Ensenada"
Chart (2025)	Position
Canada Mainstream Rock (Billboard)	39
Canada Modern Rock (Billboard)	83
US Rock & Alternative Airplay (Billboard)	22
