= Godbreath =

Studio album by Stand Atlantic
- Released: 23 October 2026
- Studios: The Grove (New South Wales); Penfield (Los Angeles)
- Genre: Pop-punk
- Length: 33:37
- Label: Virgin
- Producer: Stevie Knight

Stand Atlantic chronology
Was Here (2024)	Godbreath (2026)

Singles from Godbreath
- 1. "Velcro" Released: 20 May 2026; 2. "Lucid" Released: 17 July 2026; 3. "Edge of Vegas" Released: 21 August 2026; 4. "Next2U" Released: 25 September 2026; 5. "So Cool" Released: 23 October 2026

Godbreath is the fifth studio album by the Australian pop-punk band Stand Atlantic, released on 23 October 2026 via Virgin Music Group. The album was announced in July 2026 alongside the release of its second single "Lucid".

Upon announcement, Bonnie Fraser said: "To me, Godbreath means being the most authentic version of yourself. It's someone who will do whatever they need to do to get shit done. It's the consequence of those moments when you're really leaning into what you do and you feel on top of the world. When being that honest and open just creates this whole other thing within you. It's about speaking and owning your truth."

The album debuted at #1 on the ARIA Album Charts becoming the bands first #1 album in Australia.

The album will be supported with an Australian tour in October and November 2026 followed by dates in the United States in December 2026.

== Reception ==
James Hickie from Kerrang! scored the album 4/5, calling it a "breath of fresh air" saying "It's full of joie de vivre and so effective in capturing the flush of love's early days and the lessons life teaches us that it should be prescribed listening."

== Track listing ==
All tracks are written by Bonnie Fraser and Stevie Knight, except "Edge of Vegas" (written with Lindsey Sweat) and "Gimme a Show" (written with Chloe Copoloff).

Godbreath track listing
No.	Title	Length
1.	"Lucid"	3:08
2.	"Next2U"	3:16
3.	"Velcro"	3:28
4.	"So Cool"	2:22
5.	"Favourite Flavour"	3:17
6.	"Finger"	3:06
7.	"d.L.M.A"	2:25
8.	"Edge of Vegas"	3:40
9.	"Teeth"	3:00
10.	"Headrush"	3:05
11.	"Gimme a Show"	2:50
Total length:		33:37

== Personnel ==
Credits are adapted from the album's liner notes and Tidal.

=== Stand Atlantic ===
- Bonnie Fraser – vocals, guitars
- Jonno Panichi – drums
- Miki Rich – bass
- David Potter – guitars

=== Additional contributors ===
- Stevie Knight – production
- Nick Rad – mixing
- Grant Berry – mastering
- Pat Fox – artwork
- Joey Cavallo – engineering (tracks 4, 5, 8)
- Mattia Di Paolo – production assistance
- Shuya Yamamoto – bass direction
- Owen Butterworth – engineering (1–3, 6, 7, 9–11)
- Jackson Kirby – engineering assistance (1–3, 6, 7, 9–11)
- Brandon "Babyman" Jones – backline technician, bongos (1–3, 6, 7, 9–11)

== Charts ==
Chart performance for Godbreath
Chart (2026)	Peak position
Australian Albums (ARIA)	1
UK Albums Sales (Official Charts)	84
UK Independent Albums (Official Charts)	29
UK Rock & Metal Albums (Official Charts)	11
