= Pepper (song) =

1996 single by Butthole Surfers

Single by Butthole Surfers

from the album Electriclarryland
- B-side: "Let's Talk About Cars"
- Released: April 11, 1996
- Genre: Electronic rock; rap rock; psychedelic rap; spoken word
- Length: 4:57
- Label: Capitol
- Songwriters: Gibby Haynes; Paul Leary; King Coffey
- Producer: Steve Thompson

Butthole Surfers singles chronology
"Good King Wencenslaus/The Lord Is a Monkey" (1994)	"Pepper" (1996)	"Jingle of a Dog's Collar" (1996)

Music video
- "Pepper" on YouTube

Audio sample
- file; help

"Pepper" is a song by American alternative rock band Butthole Surfers from their seventh studio album, Electriclarryland (1996). Released on April 11, 1996, the track reached number one on the Billboard Modern Rock Tracks chart and number 26 on the Billboard Hot 100 Airplay chart, becoming the top-ranked song of 1996 on the former listing. In Australia, the song peaked at number 15 on the ARIA Singles Chart and was ranked number four on Triple J's Hottest 100 of 1996. It also reached number two on the Canadian RPM Alternative 30 and number 32 in New Zealand.

== Composition and lyrics ==
"Pepper" opens with the chorus guitar riff, slowed down to half speed. The song shifts from spoken word verses to sung choruses. The lyrics of the verses list ten characters and describes how some either die or escape a brush with death. The song also contains the bridge played in reverse. The reversed words are the first and last lines of the chorus: "I don't mind the sun sometimes; the images it shows; you never know just how you look through other people's eyes."

According to Spike TV, who put the song on their list of "The Top 10 Hits the Band Wishes Didn't Exist", the song was written as "a send-up of Beck". However, in an interview with the Hartford Courant the year of the single's release, drummer King Coffey cited Massive Attack, Tricky and Soul II Soul as influences on the sound.

== Music video ==
The video for "Pepper", directed by Gavin Bowden, features 1960s style news clip-like footage of the band members being arrested in a Texas hotel for kidnapping while newscasters and cameramen crowd around. The kidnapping victim, rescued by the police, is portrayed by Erik Estrada. Singer Gibby Haynes is portrayed as the ringleader, and is shown being interviewed by reporters as police gather evidence. The newsreel segment is filmed in 16mm black and white, and is broken up by 1960s-style color footage, showing the band performing on a show much like American Bandstand. This performance footage is interspersed with 1960s style enactments of cooking and variety shows. The police and Estrada are repeatedly shown eating corn from a can, which, according to the director, is "a reference to the way videos are made; how directors have to have this shot and that shot – how they're spoon-feeding images to the audience."

== Track listings ==
US CD and maxi-cassette single

1. "Pepper" (edit)
2. "Pepper" (album version)
3. "Let's Talk About Cars"

UK CD single

1. "Pepper"
2. "Hybrid"

UK limited-edition 7-inch red vinyl single

A. "Pepper" (single edit)
B. "Pepper" (Butcha' Bros remix)

European CD single

1. "Pepper"
2. "Hybrid"
3. "Pepper" (Butcha' Bros. remix)
4. "The Lord Is a Monkey" (demo)

== Charts ==
=== Weekly charts ===
Chart (1996)	Peak position
Australia (ARIA)	15
Canada Rock/Alternative (RPM)	2
Estonia (Eesti Top 20)	13
New Zealand (Recorded Music NZ)	32
Scottish Singles Sales (Official Charts)	82
UK Singles (Official Charts)	59
US Hot 100 Airplay (Billboard)	26
US Mainstream Rock Tracks (Billboard)	19
US Modern Rock Tracks (Billboard)	1
US Top 40/Mainstream (Billboard)	38
US Cash Box Top 100	72

=== Year-end charts ===
Chart (1996)	Position
Australia (ARIA)	77
Canada Rock/Alternative (RPM)	31
US Mainstream Rock Tracks (Billboard)	80
US Modern Rock Tracks (Billboard)	1

== Release history ==
Region	Date	Format(s)	Label(s)	Ref.
United States	April 11, 1996	College; alternative radio	Capitol	
United Kingdom	September 16, 1996	7-inch vinyl; CD	Capitol	

== Cover version ==
On September 2, 2010, Hesta Prynn of Northern State and Shawn Crahan of Slipknot released a cover of "Pepper" as a 7-inch vinyl single. The B-side of the single is the previously unreleased track "Seven Sisters".
