= Look Outside Your Window =

Studio album by Look Outside Your Window
- Released: April 18, 2026
- Recorded: 2008
- Studio: Sound Farm (Jamaica, Iowa)
- Length: 40:20
- Producer: Look Outside Your Window

Look Outside Your Window is a studio album recorded by Corey Taylor, Jim Root, Shawn Crahan and Sid Wilson, four members of the American heavy metal band Slipknot. The album was released on 2026's Record Store Day on Saturday April 18, being released under the "Look Outside Your Window" moniker, instead of Slipknot. The material was written and recorded concurrently with the sessions for the band's fourth studio album All Hope Is Gone (2008). However, its emphasis on experimentation and a more melodic rock style kept it classified as a separate body of work from Slipknot's aggressive heavy metal sound. The album was scheduled for release during the latter half of the band's We Are Not Your Kind touring cycle, which was delayed until 2021 due to the COVID-19 pandemic. After numerous delays, Crahan confirmed the album would be released in 2026.

== Background and recording ==
The album originates with the recording sessions for Slipknot's fourth studio album All Hope Is Gone (2008). Two separate recording sessions in two separate studios occurred concurrently; the All Hope Is Gone sessions, which included the entirety of the nine-piece band, and the Look Outside Your Window sessions, which only included four band members; Corey Taylor (vocals), Jim Root (guitar), Shawn Crahan (percussion), and Sid Wilson (turntables). Crahan noted that the sessions began with himself and Root initially, with Taylor and Wilson coming in shortly later, and it became a group project shared among the four of them, separate from Slipknot, in his eyes. Taylor noted that, while the band pursued their regular heavy metal sound in the All Hope Is Gone sessions, the members who took part in the Look Outside Your Window sessions took a more experimental approach to the music. He described the material as far more melodic than typical Slipknot material, with more of a rock music-vibe, with some more artistic qualities akin to the work of Radiohead. Root recalled unconventional approaches in the sessions, including recording the song of a frog croaking, and then building a song around that recording, and having Taylor sing a track from the bottom of a well, making it sound like he was singing in a cavern.

Eleven songs were recorded in the sessions. At one point, Taylor, who loved the music from both sessions, attempted to combine the material from both projects into one collective album, creating what he described as an alternate tracklist/sequencing of All Hope Is Gone containing Look Outside Your Window material intermixed. However, due to turmoil within the band at the time, Taylor was unable to find support from any other band members on the endeavor, and he subsequently dropped the idea. Only one song from the Look Outside Your Window sessions ended up making it onto All Hope Is Gone; the track "Til We Die" originated from the Look Outside Your Window sessions, and was placed on the All Hope Is Gone special edition as a bonus track. Despite the association, Crahan maintains that the album is a "very unique art piece on its own".

Root noted the track "My Pain" had originated in the Look Outside Your Window sessions as well, and was later revisited and reworked onto the Slipknot album We Are Not Your Kind in 2019. Additionally, in the 2016 action thriller film Officer Downe, directed by Crahan, in the movie's credits, a song titled "Juliette" was said to be performed by "Look Outside Your Window" and written by Crahan, Taylor, Wilson and Root.

== Release and promotion ==
Crahan and Taylor had mentioned various plans for releasing the material over the years. Crahan noted that they had wanted to release it ever since its creation in 2008, but had difficulty with figuring out how to time the release without it interfering with other albums or band downtime. The album's masters are owned by the four people that made it, as opposed to Slipknot's label at the time Roadrunner Records, which ultimately left them in charge of its release. Plans to release it early in the touring cycle for their We Are Not Your Kind (2019) album arose, though the plans were delayed as to not take away the momentum of said album – which ended up topping the album chart in the US, much to Taylor's surprise. In January 2020, Crahan revealed the album, at one point had an unannounced surprise Christmas 2019 release date, but it was delayed again, for undisclosed reasons. Crahan noted that there were still plans for it to be released during the latter half of the We Are Not Your Kind touring cycle, though the COVID-19 pandemic forced the band to cancel much of their 2020 touring or reschedule for 2021. No concrete release date had been given at this point, though publications had predicted a release in 2020 or 2021,.

On January 2, 2023, Crahan spoke about the possibility of the album being released later in 2023. Specifically, he noted that they aimed to release it after April 1, 2023, the date that Slipknot would no longer be signed to Roadrunner Records. In March of the same year, Taylor, while promoting the upcoming release of his second solo album CMF2, distanced himself from the record, calling it "[Crahan]'s baby" and referring to himself as "guest star" on the album. He also stated that he did not know the tracklist, did not have access to the master tracks, and hoped that the album would never be released publicly, fearing that the hype behind it had created expectations that could never be matched by listeners. In December 2023, it was announced that the album was mixed and mastered, with album artwork, and ready for a tentative release in 2024. The following year, Crahan emphasized that there was no conspiracy preventing the release of Look Outside Your Window, but rather a deliberate consideration of its relevance and impact given the changing times. In late 2025, Crahan confirmed that the album would finally be released in 2026.

On February 4, 2026, an exclusive vinyl edition was confirmed for release Record Store Day 2026 on April 18, 2026. A general release, on CD digipak and non-RSD vinyl happened on June 12, it had been available for pre-order beginning May 19.

== Track listing ==
All lyrics are written by Shawn Crahan; all music is composed by Crahan, Corey Taylor, Sid Wilson, and Jim Root, except "Juliette", composed by Crahan and Taylor.

No.	Title	Length
1.	"11th March"	4:20
2.	"Moth"	5:23
3.	"Dirge"	3:48
4.	"Christina"	1:07
5.	"Is Real"	4:52
6.	"Away"	4:20
7.	"In Reverse"	4:05
8.	"Toad"	6:10
9.	"Juliette"	3:35
10.	"U Can't Stop This"	2:40
Total length:		40:20

== Personnel ==
Credits are adapted from the album's liner notes and Rolling Stone.

=== Look Outside Your Window ===
- Jim Root – guitars, bass, arrangements, recording, production
- Sid Wilson – keyboards, piano, arrangements, recording, production
- Corey Taylor – vocals, percussion, arrangements, recording, production
- Michael Shawn Crahan – drums, percussion, vocals on "Toad" and "U Can't Stop This", arrangements, recording, production, executive production, art, photography

=== Additional personnel ===
- Cristina Scabbia – spoken word on "Christina", additional vocals on "Is Real"
- Gregory Gordon – mixing
- Fred Kevorkian – mastering
- Virgilio Tzaj – design

== Charts ==
Chart performance for Look Outside Your Window
Chart (2026)	Peak position
Austrian Albums (Ö3 Austria)	74
Belgian Albums (Ultratop Wallonia)	163
French Physical Albums (SNEP)	73
French Rock & Metal Albums (SNEP)	19
Scottish Albums (Official Charts)	13
UK Albums (Official Charts)	42
UK Independent Albums (Official Charts)	11
UK Rock & Metal Albums (Official Charts)	8
US Top Album Sales (Billboard)	41
