= After the Astronaut =

Studio album by Butthole Surfers
- Released: June 26, 2026
- Genres: Alternative rock; noise rock; psychedelic rock
- Length: 45:45
- Label: Sunset Boulevard
- Producer: Paul Leary

Butthole Surfers chronology
Live at the Leatherfly (2025)	After the Astronaut (2026)

Butthole Surfers studio chronology
Weird Revolution (2001)	After the Astronaut (2026)

Singles from After the Astronaut
- 1. "Jet Fighter" Released: March 17, 2026; 2. "Imbuya" Released: April 21, 2026; 3. "Intelligent Guy (Astronaut Version)" Released: 2026

After the Astronaut is a studio album by the American rock band Butthole Surfers, released on June 26, 2026 through Sunset Boulevard Records. After the Astronaut was originally recorded in the late 1990s, but after it was shelved, the band reworked many of its tracks for the 2001 album Weird Revolution.

== Background ==
Despite their success with the album Electriclarryland (1996), the band's relationship with Capitol Records grew increasingly strained. After the Astronaut, which was intended for release in 1998 as the follow-up to Electriclarryland, was shelved, and the Butthole Surfers parted ways acrimoniously with their manager, Tom Bunch. After resolving their dispute with Capitol, they re-recorded most of After the Astronaut's songs for their 2001 album Weird Revolution, on the Hollywood Records/Surfdog Records imprint, which was their most electronic album to date and had a trip hop sound.

== Release and promotion ==
On March 17, 2026, Butthole Surfers announced that After the Astronaut would finally be released on June 26, by Sunset Boulevard Records. The album's announcement came with the release of its lead single "Jet Fighter". On April 21, 2026, the band released the second single "Imbuya".

== Track listing ==
All tracks are written by Gibby Haynes, Paul Leary and King Coffey.

No.	Title	Length
1.	"Weird Revolution"	4:03
2.	"Intelligent Guy" (Astronaut version)	3:15
3.	"Jet Fighter"	2:42
4.	"Mexico"	3:50
5.	"Imbuya"	2:55
6.	"Venus"	3:53
7.	"The Last Astronaut"	4:38
8.	"Yentel"	3:22
9.	"Junkie Jenny in Gaytown"	4:22
10.	"They Came In"	5:03
11.	"I Don't Have a Problem"	5:00
12.	"Turkey and Dressing"	2:42
Total length:		45:45

== Personnel ==
Credits adapted from Tidal.

=== Butthole Surfers ===
- Gibby Haynes – vocals
- Paul Leary – guitar, bass guitar, production, mixing
- King Coffey – drums

=== Additional contributors ===
- Howie Weinberg – mastering
- Stuart Sullivan – recording

== Charts ==
Chart performance for After the Astronaut
Chart (2026)	Peak position
UK Albums Sales (OCC)	95
UK Independent Albums (Official Charts)	35
US Top Album Sales (Billboard)	45
