= Was Here (Stand Atlantic album) =

Studio album by Stand Atlantic
- Released: 23 August 2024
- Length: 41:46
- Label: Hopeless
- Producer: Stevie Knight

Stand Atlantic chronology
F.E.A.R. (2022)	Was Here (2024)	Godbreath (2026)

Singles from Was Here
- 1. "Killher" Released: 3 February 2023; 2. "Sex on the Beach" Released: 10 November 2023; 3. "Warz0ne" Released: 16 February 2024; 4. "Girl$" Released: 29 March 2024; 5. "Love U Anyway" Released: 9 May 2024; 6. "Criminal" Released: 21 June 2024; 7. "Frenemies" Released: 2 August 2024

Singles from Was Here (Deluxe)
- 1. "I'm the Man" Released: 4 April 2025

Was Here is the fourth studio album by the Australian pop-punk band Stand Atlantic. The album was announced in March 2024 alongside its fourth single "Girl$", and released on 23 August 2024. It peaked at number 3 on the ARIA Charts, becoming their first top five charting release.

The band toured the United States from July to August 2024, and Europe from August to September 2024, in support of the album

A deluxe version of the album was released in May 2025, featuring four new tracks.

== Reception ==
Angela Croudace from Heavy Mag said "Overall, Was Here offers a captivating blend of sound experimentation, with certain tracks standing out amid the album's varied genre exploration. It showcases a dynamic mix of styles, highlighting the band's potential for future innovation. This album underscores the exciting possibilities when Stand Atlantic combines their signature sound with new influences."

Rachel Roberts from Kerrang! gave the album 4/5 and said "Across 15 tracks, the flaming four-piece delve into the complexities of moving on from tumultuous life experiences, baring even the ugliest of emotions like gritted teeth – anger, pettiness, regret. In turn, they create an affirming record which examines pain through a realistic lens."

Amber Bintliff from WMSC (FM) called it "their most diverse and hard-hitting project yet".

== Track listing ==
All tracks are written by Bonnie Fraser and Stevie Knight, except "Nose Bleed" (written with William Schultz), "Criminal" (written with Daniel Furnari and Jamie Hails), and "I'm the Man" (written with Lauren Sanderson).

Was Here track listing
No.	Title	Length
1.	"Wake Up-Sit Down-Shut Up"	3:00
2.	"Frenemies"	3:10
3.	"Girl$" (featuring Pvris and Bruses)	2:12
4.	"Freakin' Out"	2:45
5.	"Nose Bleed" (featuring Sueco)	3:15
6.	"Love U Anyway"	2:56
7.	"Kissin' Killer Cobras"	2:45
8.	"Warz0ne"	2:38
9.	"Criminal" (featuring Polaris)	3:47
10.	"17"	3:07
11.	"17 // Reprize [One Take]"	1:28
12.	"G.A.G."	2:22
13.	"Rockstar"	2:38
14.	"Sex on the Beach"	3:10
15.	"Killher"	2:25
Total length:		41:46

Was Here (Deluxe) track listing
No.	Title	Length
16.	"I'm the Man" (featuring Lauren Sanderson)	2:42
17.	"Nothing Hurts When You're Hollow"	2:47
18.	"Freakin' Out" (Pvris remix)	2:42
19.	"Criminal" (Mr. Bill remix)	3:30
Total length:		53:29

== Personnel ==
Credits are adapted from the album's liner notes and Tidal.

=== Stand Atlantic ===
- Bonnie Fraser – lead vocals
- Miki Rich – bass guitar
- Jonno Panichi – drums
- David Potter – guitar

=== Additional contributors ===
- Stevie Knight – production
- Grant Berry – mastering
- James Paul Wisner – mixing (tracks 1, 2, 4, 6–8, 10–13, 15–17)
- Zakk Cervini – mixing (3, 9)
- Cody Stebbings – keyboards (5, 6, 11)
- Kevin McCombs – mixing (5)
- Colin Brittain – mixing (5)
- Alex Ghenea – mixing (14)
- Lyndsey Gunnulfsen – mixing (18)
- Mr. Bill – mixing (19)
- Brandon Lung – artwork photography
- Abby Coulson – artwork graphics

== Charts ==
Weekly chart performance for Was Here
Chart (2024–2025)	Peak position
Australian Albums (ARIA)	3
Scottish Albums (Official Charts)	38
UK Independent Albums (Official Charts)	22
