= Until the Sun Explodes =

Studio album by Sublime
- Released: June 12, 2026
- Length: 57:01
- Labels: Sublime; Atlantic
- Producer: Jon Joseph

Sublime chronology
Everything Under the Sun (2006)	Until the Sun Explodes (2026)

Singles from Until the Sun Explodes
- 1. "Ensenada" Released: July 18, 2025; 2. "Until the Sun Explodes" Released: March 25, 2026; 3. "Can't Miss You" Released: May 15, 2026; 4. "Gangstalker" Released: May 29, 2026

Until the Sun Explodes is the fourth and final studio album by American ska punk band Sublime. It was released on June 12, 2026, through Atlantic Records and Sublime Recordings. It is their first studio album in 30 years following their self-titled third album in 1996, as well as their first to feature singer and guitarist Jakob Nowell, replacing his father Bradley, who died in 1996.

== Production ==
In March 2025, Sublime announced they were working on a fourth album with Travis Barker producing.

Jakob Nowell has stated that although the self-titled album is "the last Sublime record that will ever be made", Until the Sun Explodes serves as "a tribute to the expansive works of the band" and "an acknowledgment for all that my father has done for me my entire life, and most importantly it is a thank you."

== Critical reception ==
Professional ratings
Aggregate scores
Source	Rating
Metacritic	53/100
Review scores
Source	Rating
AllMusic	3/5 stars
The Arts Desk	4/5 stars
Distorted Sound	9/10
Kerrang!	2/5
Paste	C−
Pitchfork	4.7/10
Spectrum Culture	44%
Sputnikmusic	3.5/5

According to the review aggregator Metacritic, Until the Sun Explodes received "mixed or average reviews" based on a weighted average score of 53 out of 100 from 5 critic scores.

== Track listing ==
All tracks are written by Jakob Nowell, Bud Gaugh, Eric Wilson, Jon Joseph, and Zane Vandevort, with additional writers noted.

Until the Sun Explodes track listing
No.	Title	Writer(s)	Length
1.	"Ensenada"		2:34
2.	"Wizard"		1:59
3.	"Can't Miss You"		2:32
4.	"Backwards" (featuring Fidlar)	Zac Carper	3:24
5.	"Maybe Partying Will Help... Pt. 1"		1:50
6.	"Favorite Song" (featuring Skegss)	Skegss	2:51
7.	"Personal Hell"		2:04
8.	"F.T.R."		3:04
9.	"Evil Men"		3:10
10.	"Trey's Song" (featuring H.R.)	Willard Pangborn	3:34
11.	"Casino Taormina"	Josh Freshy	3:08
12.	"The Problem with That Is It Makes Me Stoked..."		1:18
13.	"Gangstalker"		2:34
14.	"Figueroa"		4:13
15.	"Froggy"		2:46
16.	"Come Correct" (featuring G. Love & Special Sauce)	Garrett Dutton	4:05
17.	"What For"		2:23
18.	"247-369" (featuring Pennywise)	Fletcher Dragge	1:52
19.	"Maybe Partying Will Help... Pt. 2"		0:35
20.	"Maybe Partying Will Help... Pt. 3"		0:32
21.	"Until the Sun Explodes"		2:58
22.	"Thanx Again"		3:35
Total length:			57:01

== Personnel ==
Credits are adapted from Tidal.

=== Sublime ===
- Bud Gaugh – drums (tracks 1–10, 12–22), spoken voice (5, 19, 20)
- Jakob Nowell – vocals (all tracks), acoustic guitar (9, 11)
- Eric Wilson – bass (1–10, 12–22), spoken voice (5, 19, 20)

=== Additional contributors ===
- Jon Joseph – production, mixing (all tracks); Mellotron (1, 2), acoustic guitar (1), guitar (4, 22); background vocals, percussion (4); synthesizer (8, 14), trumpet (10, 16), organ (16), vibraphone (22)
- Nathan Cimino – engineering (all tracks), percussion (21)
- Dale Becker – mastering
- Katie Harvey – mastering
- Adam Burt – mastering assistance
- Zane Vandevort – guitar (1–15, 17–21), background vocals (4), spoken voice (22)
- DJ Product – scratching (1–10, 13–17, 21, 22)
- Tim Wu – baritone saxophone (1, 15), flute (14, 16)
- Kegn Venegas – mastering assistance (1)
- Fidlar – vocals (4)
- Trey Pangborn – guitar (5, 7, 10, 12, 13, 17, 21)
- Miguel Happoldt – spoken voice (5)
- Mike Watt – spoken voice (5)
- Skegss – vocals (6)
- H.R. – vocals (10)
- David Jolly – spoken voice (12)
- Jackson Wetherbee – spoken voice (12)
- Wesley Etienne – trombone (13)
- G. Love – vocals (16)
- Pennywise – vocals (18)
- Fletcher Dragge – guitar (18)
- Derek Gordon – spoken voice (19, 20)
- Jim Nowell – spoken voice (19, 20)
- Kevin Zinger – spoken voice (19, 20)

== Charts ==
Chart performance for Until the Sun Explodes
Chart (2026)	Peak position
Australian Albums (ARIA)	81
Japanese Download Albums (Billboard Japan)	60
New Zealand Albums (RMNZ)	34
Scottish Albums (Official Charts)	51
UK Albums Sales (OCC)	36
US Billboard 200	19
US Top Rock & Alternative Albums (Billboard)	4
