= The Shame of Life =

Single by Butthole Surfers

from the album Weird Revolution
- Released: 2001
- Venue: Trip hop; rap rock; electronic rock
- Length: 3:30
- Label: Hollywood
- Songwriters: Robert J. Ritchie; Gibby Haynes; Paul Leary; King Coffey
- Producers: Rob Cavallo; Paul Leary

Butthole Surfers singles chronology
"Jingle of a Dog's Collar" (1996)	"The Shame of Life" (2001)	"Dracula from Houston" (2002)

"The Shame of Life" is a song by American alternative rock band Butthole Surfers, from their 2001 album Weird Revolution. The song was released as a CD single in Australia and peaked at #24 on Billboard's Modern Rock Tracks. The chorus was written by Kid Rock, who retains a songwriting credit for the track.

It reached number 93 in Triple J's Hottest 100 of 2001.

A music video was made for the song, featuring the band going to a bizarre house party that is portrayed by the lyrics sung by Gibby Haynes (e.g. "there were squirrels smoking crack" as a prop squirrel is shown smoking the drug). Throughout the video, other weird and disturbing events take place such as pigs with "Get Down" painted on their bodies, hot women dancing, anthropomorphic squirrels in suits that attack and drug the band, a man wearing a pig mask, Haynes wearing a modified glove with what appear to be hypodermic needles, a lady wearing a dress made of dollar bills, a man swinging a shovel around, and some women with their faces resembling squirrels. The video ends with Haynes being dragged outside by two of the anthropomorphic squirrels.

The song was featured in a trailer for the 2002 film Phone Booth.

== Background ==
The chorus of the song was written by Kid Rock after he asked to use a sample from the Butthole Surfers' Black Sabbath parody “Sweat Loaf.” Gibby Haynes said “We were like, ‘Oh, Kid Rock, ka-ching, sure,'” As a swap, Kid Rock would help write the chorus to the song. “He came to my house in his big white limousine with his five-hundred-pound bodyguards. He says, ‘Let’s just write a new song,’ and I’m like, ‘Uh, okay.”

== Track listing ==
1. "The Shame of Life" – 3:30
2. "The Shame of Life" (A Cappella) – 3:30
3. "The Shame of Life" (DJ Z-Trip Remix) – 4:15
4. "The Shame of Life" (Bonus Beats) – 3:49
