= Jakob Nowell =

American musician (born 1995)

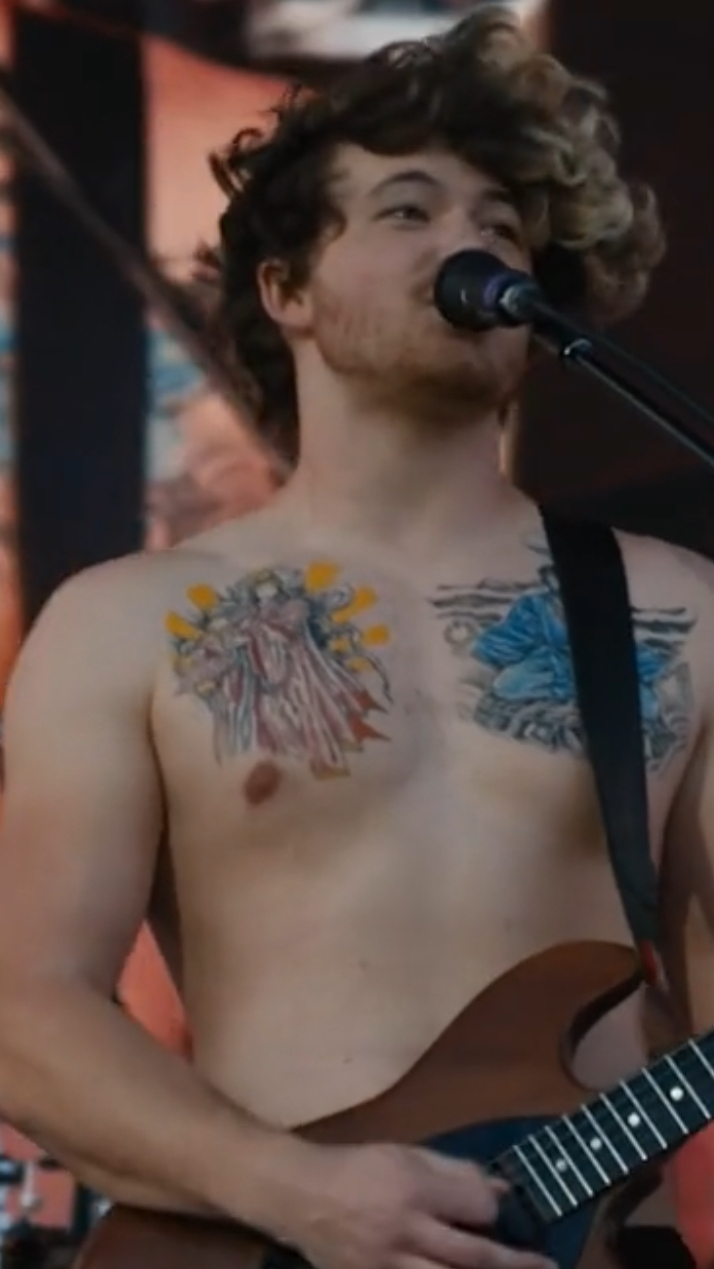
- Nowell performing with Sublime at Coachella in April 2024

Background information
- Born: Jakob James Markus Nowell; June 25, 1995 (age 31); Long Beach, California, U.S.
- Genres: Ska; punk rock; reggae; alternative rock; pop rock
- Instruments: Vocals; guitar
- Years active: 2013–present
- Labels: Skunk; Epitaph
- Member of: Sublime; Jakobs Castle
- Formerly of: LAW; Death of the Author

Jakob James Markus Nowell (born June 25, 1995) is an American musician based in Southern California. He was a founding member of the band LAW, and was their vocalist until his departure in 2021. Nowell went on to form the band Jakobs Castle. In 2023, Nowell was brought on as the frontman of Sublime, a role previously held by his father Bradley Nowell who died in 1996.

== Career ==
=== Early bands ===
Nowell was the vocalist of ska-punk band LAW, a trio that was established in Long Beach in 2013. Their first show was supported by Miguel Happoldt. LAW's debut EP was released on Skunk Records. LAW released their only full-length album, There and Back Again, in 2018. It was a departure from their original ska and reggae based influence. Nowell had a falling out with the other members of LAW in 2021, and they subsequently broke up.

Nowell briefly joined the progressive metal band Death of the Author. He contributed writing and vocals to several tracks. Nowell can be seen in the music video for their 2022 single, "Last Exit".

=== Jakobs Castle ===
Nowell went on to form Jakobs Castle with producer Jon Joseph. In 2023, the project made their label debut with Epitaph Records. Their debut album Enter: The Castle was released in April 2024. It features songs co-written by Tim Armstrong.

=== Sublime ===
In December 2023, it was announced that Rome Ramirez was departing Sublime with Rome at the end of 2024. It was later revealed that Eric Wilson and Bud Gaugh had agreed to revive Sublime, with Jakob Nowell, for a benefit show for Bad Brains vocalist H.R. at the Teragram Ballroom in Los Angeles. They also performed at Coachella in 2024. Nowell has gone on to become the band's permanent lead singer. Sublime began working on a new album with Nowell, the first for the band since 1996, and released the single "Ensenada" in July 2025. The album, Until the Sun Explodes, was released on June 12, 2026.

== Personal life ==
Nowell was born on June 25, 1995, at St. Mary Medical Center in Long Beach, California. He is the only child of Bradley Nowell, the founding guitarist and vocalist of Sublime, and Troy Dendekker. Jakob was 11 months old when his father died of a heroin overdose in 1996. Nowell became interested in music at a young age, and taught himself how to sing and play guitar on his own.

Nowell began drinking at the age of twelve which developed into alcoholism. Drug use was normalized in his household. Nowell explained that his drug and alcohol exploration stemmed from a "subconscious desire to kind of understand what my dad's experiences were".

Nowell became sober in 2017. His sobriety was documented in the 2017 film The Long Way Back: The Story of Todd Z-Man Zalkins. The documentary explores the story of Todd Zalkins, a drug interventionist, former opioid addict, and childhood friend of Nowell's father. In the film, Zalkins succeeds in his quest to get Nowell clean. Nowell, along with his grandfather and aunt, helped start the Nowell Family Foundation, a non-profit that provides addiction recovery services and support for musicians.

In 2021, he married Ashlyn Zeda. They divorced after only a few months of marriage.

Like his father, Nowell has attention deficit hyperactivity disorder.
