= Royal & the Serpent =

American singer-songwriter

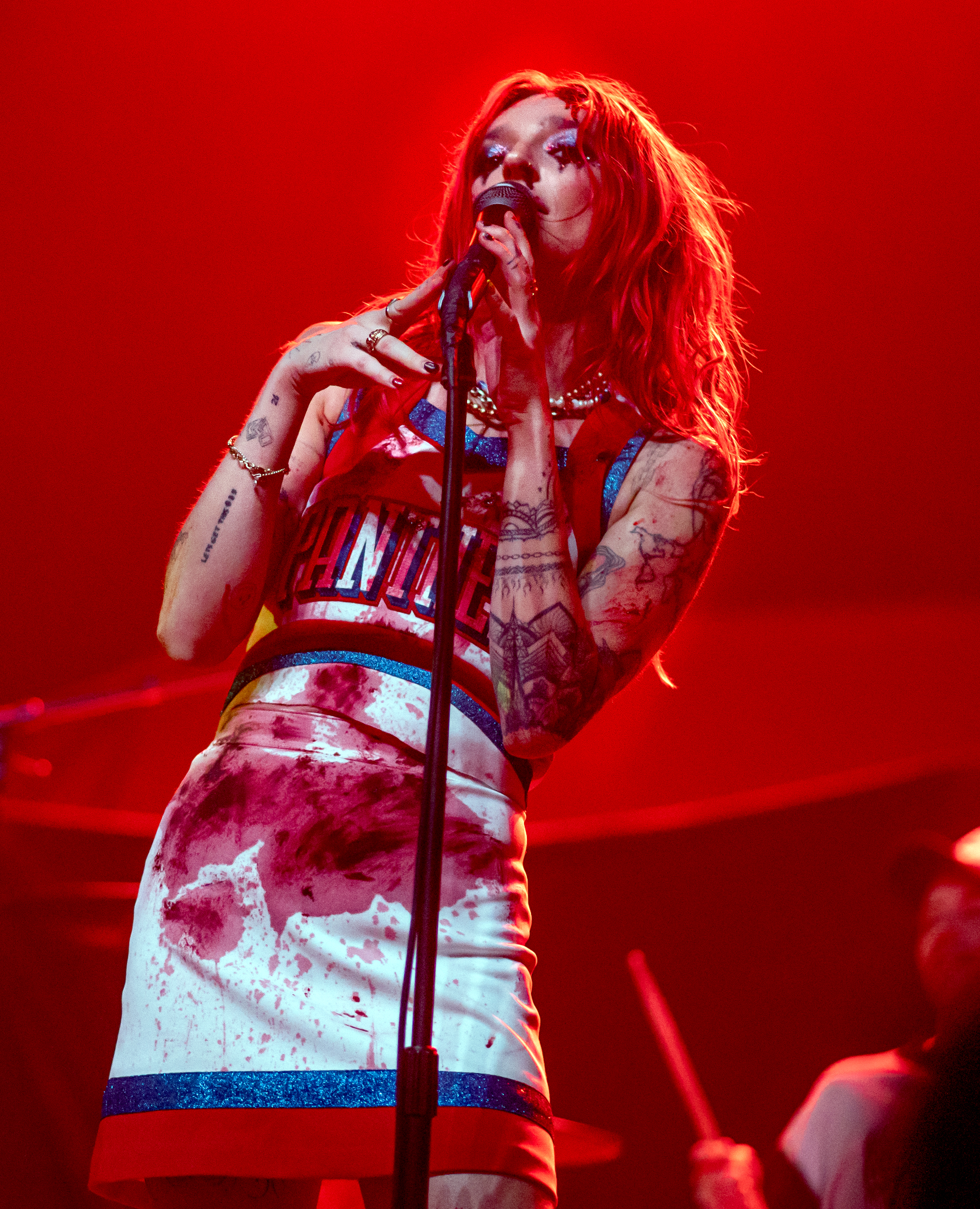
- Royal & the Serpent performing in 2021

Background information
- Born: Ryan Jillian Santiago
- Origin: New Jersey, U.S.
- Genres: Indie pop; electropop; pop-punk
- Occupations: Singer; songwriter
- Years active: 2017–present
- Label: Atlantic
- Website: royalandtheserpent.com

Ryan Jillian Santiago, known professionally as Royal & the Serpent, is an American singer and songwriter.

== Early life ==
Ryan Santiago was born in New Jersey and was raised both Catholic and Jewish. Santiago took up competitive dance as a child, until she "shattered both [her] heel plates" after jumping off a stage while performing when she was 14 years old. She subsequently delved into musical theater. In her teenage years, Santiago learned how to play the guitar and began writing songs. She attended her first concert on Britney Spears' Oops!... I Did It Again Tour at the age of six.

== Career ==
At the age of 18, Santiago moved to Los Angeles, where she attended art school and worked as a bartender in a restaurant. She has credited encouragement from a co-worker, who later became her first manager, for motivating her to pursue a professional career as a musician.

In 2017, Santiago independently released "Temperance", her debut single under the stage name Royal & the Serpent. On her moniker, she has explained that "'Royal & the Serpent' translates to 'Me + My Ego'". In 2018, she released her second single, "Together", and was featured on the song "Wicked" by music producer Tommee Profitt. By the end of 2019, she had signed with Atlantic Records.

"Overwhelmed", Royal & the Serpent's first single on Atlantic, was released in June 2020, and her debut EP get a grip was released in October. That year, she joined English singer Yungblud's Weird Time of Life virtual tour as a supporting act. Royal & the Serpent's second EP Searching for Nirvana was released in June 2021.

In January 2022, Santiago was featured as a guest vocalist on "Pity Party" by Stand Atlantic. Her third EP, If I Died Would Anyone Care, was released on January 28, 2022. Later that year she performed as a supporting act for Demi Lovato on her Holy Fvck Tour as well as grandson on his Death of a Tour tour.

In 2023, Santiago performed as a supporting act for Fall Out Boy on their So Much (for) Stardust tour. Instead of releasing a full album, she plans to release a dual-single every month from May 2023 through the end of the year. While on tour, she released a limited-edition compilation album featuring songs from her previous EPs If I Died Would Anyone Care and Happiness Is an Inside Job.

In 2024, Santiago contributed to the soundtrack of Arcane's second season with the track "Wasteland", which was released through Riot Games Music in conjunction with the season's last three episodes.

In 2026, Santiago performed as a supporting act for Ashnikko on her Smoochies tour.

== Discography ==
=== Studio albums ===
Title	Details
Emptiness Is Godly	Released: May 8, 2026; Label: Atlantic

=== Compilation albums ===
Title	Details
How to Grow a Rat	Released: June 23, 2023; Label: Atlantic; Formats: LP

=== Extended plays ===
List of extended plays
Title	Details
Get a Grip	Released: October 16, 2020; Label: Self-released; Formats: DL
Searching for Nirvana	Released: June 4, 2021; Label: Atlantic; Formats: DL
If I Died Would Anyone Care	Released: January 28, 2022; Label: Atlantic; Formats: DL
Happiness Is an Inside Job	Released: October 28, 2022; Label: Atlantic; Formats: DL

=== Singles ===
==== As lead artist ====
Title	Year	Peak chart positions		Certifications	Album
Title	Year	US Alt.	US Rock	Certifications	Album
"Temperance"	2017	—	—		Non-album singles
"Together"	2018	—	—		Non-album singles
"Weddings & Funerals"	2019	—	—		Non-album singles
"Salvador Dali" (with Marky Style)	2019	—	—		Non-album singles
"IDK" (with Marky Style)	2019	—	—		Non-album singles
"Underneath the Mask"	2019	—	—		Non-album singles
"MMXX"	2020	—	—		Non-album singles
"Overwhelmed"	2020	6	20	RIAA: Gold; MC: Gold	Get a Grip & Searching for Nirvana
"Bad Kids" (featuring Yoshi Flower)	2020	—	—		Non-album single
"I Can't Get High"	2021	—	—		Searching for Nirvana
"Fuck U"	2021	—	—		Searching for Nirvana
"Go F*ck Urself"	2021	—	—		Non-album singles
"Chips" (featuring American Teeth)	2021	—	—		Non-album singles
"I'm Not Sorry"	2021	—	—		If I Died Would Anyone Care
"Lucid Dreams" (with Beauty School Dropout)	2021	—	—		Non-album single
"Fuckboi Rejects"	2022	—	—		If I Died Would Anyone Care
"Happier in Hell"	2022	—	—		Non-album single
"Im Fine"	2022	—	—		Happiness Is an Inside Job
"Death of Me"	2022	—	—		Happiness Is an Inside Job
"Love Abuser (Save Me)"	2022	—	—		Happiness Is an Inside Job
"Happiness 4 Dummies"	2022	—	—		Happiness Is an Inside Job
"Astroturf"	2023	—	—		Rat Trap I: The Blueprint
"One Nation Underdogs"	2023	—	—		Rat Trap I: The Blueprint
"Junkie"	2023	—	—		Rat Trap 2: The Burn
"Slug"	2023	—	—		Rat Trap 2: The Burn
"Utopia"	2023	—	—		Rat Trap 3: The Band-Aid
"Sweet Tooth"	2023	—	—		Rat Trap 3: The Band-Aid
"U Ruined Frank Ocean 4 Me"	2023	—	—		Rat Trap 4: The Burden
"Separation Anxiety"	2023	—	—		Rat Trap 4: The Burden
"Oops"	2023	—	—		Rat Trap 4: The Burden
"American Spirit"	2024	—	—		Rat Trap 5: The Beginning
"Dog"	2024	—	—		Rat Trap 5: The Beginning
"Death Do Us Part"	2025	—	—		Emptiness Is Godly
"Carry Me Home"	2025	—	—		Emptiness Is Godly
"Euphoria"	2025	—	—		Emptiness Is Godly
"Young as This"	2025	—	—		Emptiness Is Godly
"Steering (So Fast)"	2026	—	—		Emptiness Is Godly
"—" denotes releases that did not chart.

==== As featured artist ====
List of singles as featured artist, with selected chart positions, showing year released and album name
Title	Year	Peak chart positions	Album
Title	Year	US Dance	Album
"Wicked" (Tommee Profitt featuring Royal & the Serpent)	2018	—	Cinematic Songs (Vol. 4)
"Nectarines" (MELVV featuring Royal & the Serpent)	2020	—	Non-album single
"Wild" (J.Pollock featuring Royal & the Serpent)	2020	—	Woman
"Eat Spit!" (Slush Puppy featuring Royal & the Serpent)	2021	—	Non-album singles
"Sound the Alarm" (The Knocks featuring Rivers Cuomo and Royal & the Serpent)	2021	29	Non-album singles
"ABCDEFU" (Gayle featuring Royal & the Serpent)	2021	—	Non-album singles
"Starphucker" (Beauty School Dropout featuring Royal & the Serpent)	2021	—	Boys Do Cry
"Talk" (Louis the Child featuring Royal & the Serpent)	2022	—	To Believe
"Pity Party" (Stand Atlantic featuring Royal & the Serpent)	2022	—	F.E.A.R.
"Bitch" (GG Magree featuring Royal & the Serpent)	2022	—	Dichotomy
"Eat Me" (Demi Lovato featuring Royal & the Serpent)	2022	—	Holy Fvck
"Be Happy" (Sleeping with Sirens featuring Royal & the Serpent)	2022	—	Complete Collapse
"SOS" (Mod Sun featuring Royal & the Serpent)	2023	—	God Save the Teen
"Punkstar" (Jutes featuring Royal & the Serpent)	2023	—	Ladybug
"Kinda Smacks" (GAYLE featuring Royal & the Serpent)	2024	—	Non-album singles
"Blame Brett" (The Beaches featuring Royal & the Serpent)	2024	—	Non-album singles
"Inner Gold" (Lindsey Stirling featuring Royal & the Serpent)	2024	—	Duality
"About You" (Peking Duk featuring Royal & the Serpent)	2026	—	Paradise
"—" denotes releases that did not chart or was not released in that territory.

=== Other charted songs ===
List of other charted songs, with selected chart positions, showing year released and album name
Title	Year	Peak chart positions	Album
Title	Year	NZ Hot	Album
"Wasteland"	2024	16	Arcane League of Legends: Season 2
