= Backline (stage) =

Audio equipment at the back of a stage

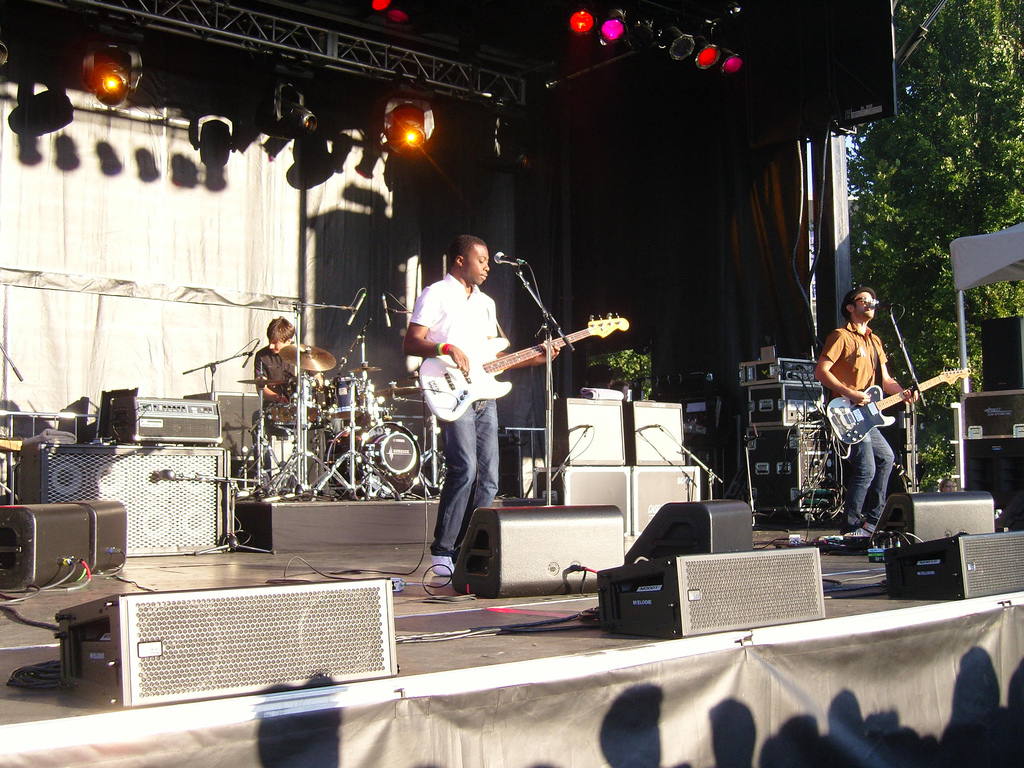
Canadian band Bedouin Soundclash performing. The backline gear, including an 8x10" bass speaker cabinet, drums, and several powerful guitar amps, can be seen behind the two musicians in the front of the stage.

The term backline is used in popular music and sound reinforcement system contexts to refer to electronic audio amplification equipment and speaker enclosures that are placed behind the band or the rhythm section on stage, including amplifiers and speaker cabinets for guitars, bass guitars and keyboards. Such equipment is often rented or leased by the band or their management, or provided by the venue. Speakers placed at the front of the stage facing the performers are also known as monitor speakers or "foldback". The main speakers facing the audience are sometimes referred to as "front of house speakers".

== History ==
In rock music's early days, PA systems were not very loud or powerful, so 1960s rock bands typically used the PA system just for the vocals, even if they were playing at a large venue. As a result, the rhythm section musicians playing electric guitar, electric bass and keyboards were expected to produce enough volume to fill the venue using their own instrument amplifiers. To achieve venue-filling sound with their instruments, bands from the 1960s typically used large, powerful guitar "stacks" and big speaker enclosures. A standard cabinet used by bassists during this era was the heavy 8x10 cabinet, which contains eight ten-inch speakers. Guitarists used one or two 4x12 cabinets, referred to, respectively, as a half stack or (full) stack.

During the 1960s, the PA speakers and the band's amplification were all set in a line, which conceptually grouped PA and instrument amplification together. This changed over the 1970s and 1980s, as PA systems became powerful enough to amplify all of the band's instruments and the vocals. During this era, the backline gear was set behind the PA speakers to create the modern audio stage set-up. Modern monitoring techniques, in which monitor speakers pointing at the performers are placed on the stage, as well as the concepts of frontline and backline, developed during this era.

Backline equipment can be rented for concert tours. Many travelling musicians prefer not to transport their own gear across borders and continents for fear of damage or customs hassles. In some countries, all electronic and electric gear needs documentation and certification by an electrical expert before it can be brought into the country. Another issue is that some bands may travel to a country or continent which uses a different type of AC mains power and differently-shaped electric plugs.

Festivals and venues provide backline gear because it speeds up the process of changing bands on a stage, because the gear does not have to be moved on and off the stage and then soundchecked again. Having professional backline gear means that the sound engineers do not have to deal with modest-quality amplifiers.

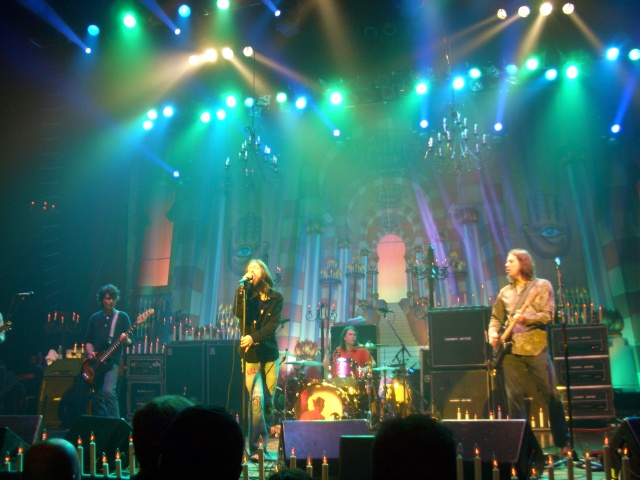
The Black Crowes at the Hammerstein Ballroom.

An emerging group on small club tours will not usually have the negotiating leverage to request specific brands and models of backline gear. However, top bands may have very specific backline requirements, including a list of amplifiers and instruments, and also the brand names and model numbers.

== Roles ==
Backline guitar technicians, audio technicians and stage crew set up and put away the backline equipment.

In places where the backline is left in place indefinitely (e.g., in a nightclub's mainstage or a TV variety show studio), the gear may simply be powered down when not in use. In music festivals with outdoor temporary stages, the backline equipment may have to be transported to a locked, climate-controlled storage area at the end of each day, to protect it from theft, vandalism and the weather.

Backline techs who travel with touring acts may also be called roadies, although the road crew's role typically is limited to transporting and positioning the instruments and gear. Maintenance and repair of instruments and gear is a specialized task handled by guitar, keyboard and drum technicians.
