= Lauren Sanderson =

American singer and songwriter

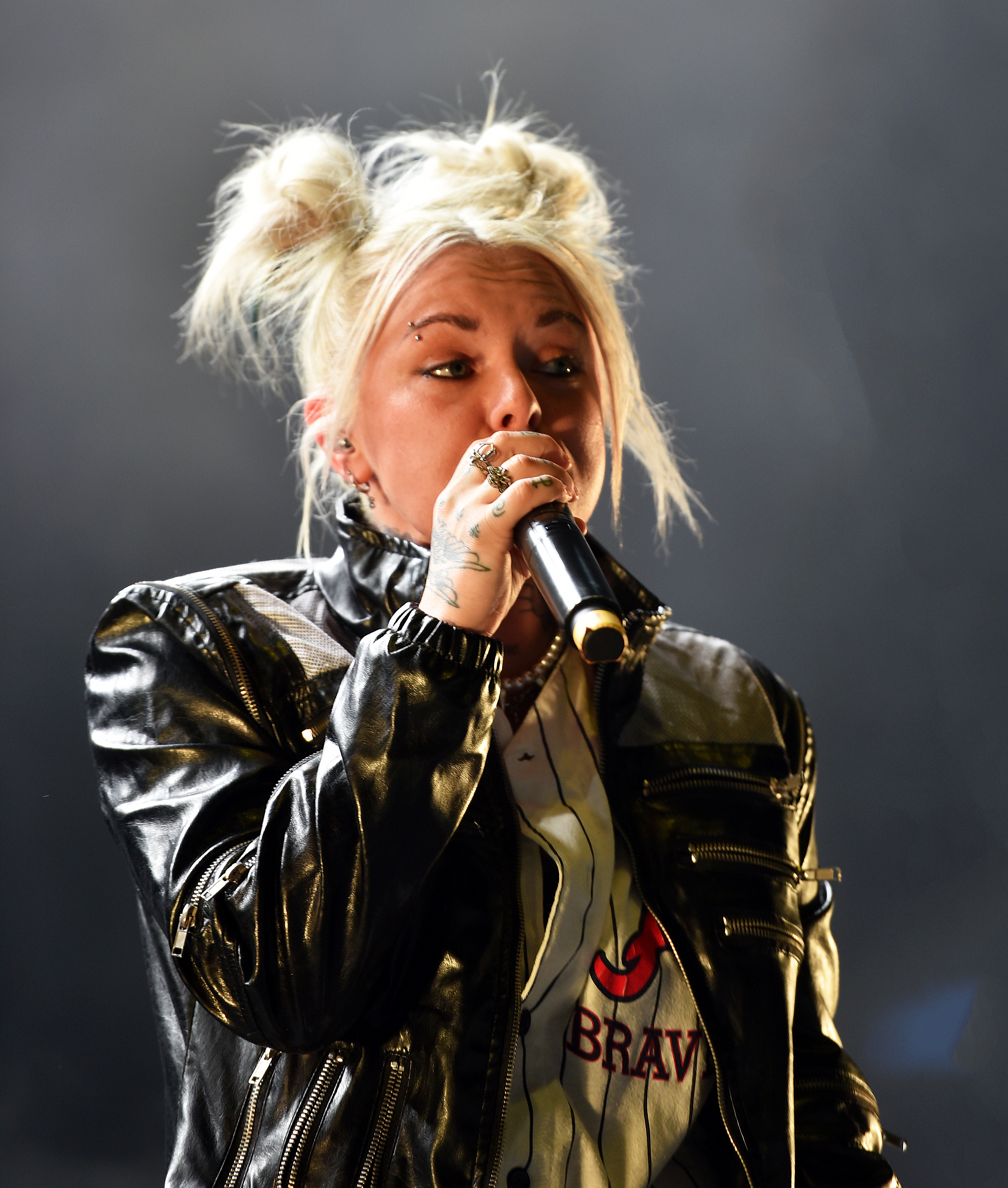
- Sanderson performing in 2023

Background information
- Born: Lauren Sanderson; January 13, 1996 (age 30); Fort Wayne, Indiana, U.S.
- Origin: Fort Wayne, Indiana, U.S.
- Genres: Pop; hip hop; rap rock; alternative
- Occupations: Singer; songwriter
- Instruments: Guitar, piano, keyboards, drums
- Years active: 2016–present
- Labels: Independent, Young Forever, Foremerly Epic Records
- Website: laurensanderson.com

Lauren Sanderson (born January 13, 1996) is an American singer and songwriter originally from Fort Wayne, Indiana, currently based in Nashville. Her music blends influences from pop, R&B and hip hop, and through it she aims to empower her fans and be "the voice for people who may not be able to speak".

== Early life ==
Sanderson grew up an only child of divorced parents. By 2014, she had built an online presence as a YouTube personality, for which she was recognized as "Most Influential Up & Comer" at the Indiana Social Media Summit six months after graduating high school. At the time, she was receiving over a million views a day on her social media. In 2015, she presented a TEDx Talk titled "For God's Sake, Just Love Them" about coming out as lesbian and how parents can foster a relationship of mutual respect with their children. As she continued giving motivational speeches at local schools and amassing an online following, she began channeling the stress of maintaining her positive outlook into writing raps and poems. Originally influenced by artists like Mac Miller, Logic, and Tyler, the Creator, she would search for similar beats on YouTube and sing over them on cassettes played in her car stereo.

== Career ==
=== 2016–2017: Center of Expression and Spaces ===
Sanderson gained early attention as a musician via her YouTube and SoundCloud channels, including a cover of Maroon 5's "She Will Be Loved." In June 2016, Sanderson released her debut EP Center of Expression and was subsequently hailed an "artist to watch" by Young Hollywood

Like her first, in 2017 Sanderson released her second EP Spaces independently, which reached No. 1 on the iTunes R&B albums chart and No. 24 on Billboard Heatseekers chart. The success of the EP garnered the attention of Epic Records, with whom Sanderson signed a record deal and moved to Los Angeles. Sanderson promoted the release with an 18 city self-booked tour.

=== 2018: Epic Records and Dont Panic! ===
Sanderson re-released her song "Written in the Stars" (previously included on her Spaces EP) produced by FKi 1st and Earl Saga in March 2018 with the addition of Philadelphia rapper PnB Rock, and used the single release to publicly announce her signing with Epic Records.

In August 2018, Sanderson released her debut major-label six-track EP Dont Panic! on Epic Records, which reached No. 2 on the iTunes R&B charts as well as No. 48 on the main chart. The title, which is also tattooed on her neck, was self-reassurance about overcoming the pressures of the music industry. To promote the release, Sanderson performed at LA Pride in West Hollywood, an LA Sparks halftime show for their Pride Night, and the BET Experience at the Los Angeles Convention Center.

In December, Sanderson was featured as part of Vevo's DSCVR Artist to Watch series and performed at their SXSW Vevo House showcase in March 2019.

=== 2019–present: Hasta La Vista and Midwest Kids Can Make It Big ===
Sanderson would eventually leave Epic Records, self-releasing a 3-song EP Hasta La Vista in June 2019 which she used to announce her independence on Twitter, and later signed a one-album deal with executive Chris Anokute and his label Young Forever. That same month, Sanderson began supporting Chase Atlantic on their Phases Tour.

On September 24, 2019, Sanderson released her first single "Hotel Room" from her forthcoming debut album, which premiered on Zane Lowe's Beats 1 show on Apple Music, followed by a music video on September 27. She joined Finneas on his Blood Harmony tour and released two additional singles, "Upset" and "To the People I Hurt," in late 2019 before ultimately releasing her album Midwest Kids Can Make It Big in January 2020. Sanderson had announced tour dates beginning in March to promote the release, though they were postponed due to the COVID-19 pandemic.

In August, Sanderson announced a deluxe version of her debut album and released her new single "Frustrated", whose music video premiered on Ones To Watch, and announced her rescheduled tour dates beginning in April 2021. The track received accolades from Alt Press who included it in their "40 Artists You Need to Hear in September" list, as well as Billboard who named it one of their "10 Cool New Pop Songs to Get You Through the Week". The deluxe version was released on August 21, featuring 7 previously unreleased tracks. Sanderson plans to return to being independent in 2021.

== Discography ==
=== Albums ===
Title	Album details
Midwest Kids Can Make It Big	Released: January 13, 2020; Label: Young Forever; Formats: Digital download, streaming
Death of a Fantasy	Released: July 29, 2022; Label: Rix; Formats: Digital download, streaming
Lauren	Released: May 29, 2026; Label: Pack Records; Formats: Digital download, streaming

=== EPs ===
Title	Album details
Center of Expression	Released: June 3, 2016; Label: Self-released; Formats: Digital download, streaming
Spaces	Released: July 13, 2017; Label: Self-released; Formats: Digital download, streaming
Dont Panic!	Released: August 24, 2018; Label: Epic; Formats: Digital download, streaming
Hasta La Vista	Released: June 15, 2019; Label: Self-released; Formats: Digital download, streaming
Songs I'll Eat You Out To	Released: February 14, 2023; Label: Rix; Formats: Digital download, streaming
Fine Ill Get In My Feelings	Released: October 25, 2024; Label: Pack Records; Formats: Digital download, streaming

=== Singles ===
Title	Year	Album
"Oceans"	2015	Non-album single
"Dear Universe"	2015	Non-album single
"Self Control"	2016	Non-album single
"Deja Vu"	2016	Non-album single
"Fake Love"	2016	Non-album single
"Black Beatles X You Was Right"	2016	Non-album single
"Alotta Me"	2016	Non-album single
"Drive"	2017	Non-album single
"Written in the Stars" (featuring PnB Rock)	2018	Spaces
"Hotel Room"	2019	Midwest Kids Can Make It Big
"Upset"	2019	Midwest Kids Can Make It Big
"To the People I Hurt"	2019	Midwest Kids Can Make It Big
"Internet"	2020	Midwest Kids Can Make It Big
"Frustrated"	2020	Midwest Kids Can Make It Big
"Hi."	2021	Death of a Fantasy
"Queen Bee"	2021	Death of a Fantasy
"Girl from the Internet"	2021	Death of a Fantasy
"Everyone's Pretentious & I'm Bored"	2021	Non-album single
"Therapy!"	2022	Death of a Fantasy
"Gay 4 Me" (with G Flip)	2022	Non-album single
"Tongue Tied"	2022	Death of a Fantasy
"Nothing Lasts Forever"	2022	Death of a Fantasy
"Wet"	2022	Songs I'll Eat You Out To
"Better Than Your BF"	2022	Songs I'll Eat You Out To
"Often"	2023	Songs I'll Eat You Out To
"Hope Ur Doing Well Somewhere"	2023	Non-album singles
"It's You"	2023	Non-album singles
"Miss You When Im High"	2023	Non-album singles
"Casket"	2023	Non-album singles
"Atleast I Dont Wanna Die"	2023	Non-album singles
"Crush!"	2023	Non-album singles
"IDC At All"	2023	Non-album singles
"She Loves Me, She Loves Me Not"	2023	Non-album singles
"They Wont Like This"	2024	Non-album singles
"Freak"	2024	Non-album singles
"Play a Part"	2024	Fine Ill Get In My Feelings
"Hypocrite"	2024	Fine Ill Get In My Feelings
"Allison"	2024	Fine Ill Get In My Feelings
"Smoking Section"	2025	Lauren
"Spell It Out"	2026	Lauren
"Trampoline"	2026	Lauren
"COME SAY SUM"	2026	Lauren
"COME SAY SUM" (featuring Fred Durst)	2026	Lauren

== See also ==
- K.Flay
