= Weird Revolution =

Studio album by Butthole Surfers
- Released: August 28, 2001
- Genres: Trip hop; alternative rock; electronica
- Length: 63:42
- Labels: Surfdog; Hollywood
- Producers: Paul Leary; Rob Cavallo

Butthole Surfers chronology
Electriclarryland (1996)	Weird Revolution (2001)	Humpty Dumpty LSD (2002)

Singles from Weird Revolution
- 1. "The Shame of Life" Released: 2001; 2. "Dracula from Houston" Released: 2002

Weird Revolution is the eighth studio album by the American rock band Butthole Surfers, released in 2001 on Surfdog Records and Hollywood Records. It is in large part a rerecorded version of an earlier album, tentatively entitled After the Astronaut, that was abandoned in 1998 and not officially released until 2026.

The initial release of this album featured a lenticular cover and jewel case that shows the baby's limbs moving and shooting a beam at other aircraft on the cover. The song "They Came In" was featured on the soundtrack to Mission: Impossible 2. The song "The Shame of Life" was featured in the trailer for Phone Booth. The song "Dracula From Houston" was featured in an episode of the NBC comedy series Scrubs and was featured in the surfing documentary Step into Liquid, a film by Dana Brown.

As of 2026, Weird Revolution remains the band's last album to date to feature brand-new material.

== Reception ==
Professional ratings
Aggregate scores
Source	Rating
Metacritic	46/100
Review scores
Source	Rating
AllMusic	4/5 stars
Alternative Press	2.5/5 stars
Blender	2/5 stars
E!	B
Entertainment Weekly	C+
Pitchfork	0.4/10
The Rolling Stone Album Guide	4/5 stars
Spin	6/10

The album was met with mixed-to-negative reviews. Pitchfork was particularly negative about it, saying "The thin music seems to emanate from a TV you can't turn off. Each song putters on a weak beat that jangles and blips as if they dumped the ambient sounds of a Midway arcade over some Black Grape outtakes."

== Track listing ==
All tracks are written by Butthole Surfers (Gibby Haynes, Paul Leary, King Coffey), except where noted.

No.	Title	Writer(s)	Length
1.	"The Weird Revolution"		3:36
2.	"The Shame of Life"	Haynes, Robert J. Ritchie	3:54
3.	"Dracula from Houston"	Haynes, Nathan Calhoun	3:42
4.	"Venus"		3:55
5.	"Shit Like That"		3:18
6.	"Mexico"		3:50
7.	"Intelligent Guy"	Haynes	3:04
8.	"Get Down"		5:29
9.	"Jet Fighter"		2:57
10.	"The Last Astronaut"		4:07
11.	"Yentel"	Haynes	3:22
12.	"They Came In" (includes hidden track (Note: The song "They Came In" ends at minute 4:02. After 17 minutes and 50 seconds of silence, at minute 21:52 begins a hidden track: it's a reprise of the song "The Last Astronaut".))	Haynes	22:23

== Singles ==
"The Shame of Life"

1. "The Shame of Life"
2. "The Shame of Life" (A Cappella)
3. "The Shame of Life" (DJ Z-Trip Remix)
4. "The Shame of Life" (Bonus Beats)

"Dracula from Houston"

1. "Dracula from Houston (The Bike Song) (radio edit)"
2. "They Came In"
3. "Call Out Hook"

== Personnel ==
All personnel credits for Weird Revolution are adapted from the album's liner notes.

Butthole Surfers

- Gibby Haynes – vocals
- Paul Leary – guitars; production, mixing (track 11)
- King Coffey – drums

Additional musicians

- Nathan Calhoun – bass – (2, 3, 7, 8)
- Chris Vrenna – additional drum programming (track 9)

Additional personnel

- Rob Cavallo – production (tracks 2, 3, 5, 7, 8), A&R
- Michael Bradford – engineering (tracks 1, 2, & 7), additional production (track 2)
- Stuart Sullivan – engineering (tracks 1, 4–7, & 9–12), mixing (track 11)
- Allen Sides – engineering (tracks 2, 3, & 8)
- Chris Lord-Alge – mixing (tracks 1–10 & 12)
- Brian Gardner – mastering
- Cheryl Jenets – A&R coordination
- Dave Kaplan – management
- Actionfigure – art direction, design
