= Electriclarryland =

Studio album by Butthole Surfers
- Released: May 6, 1996
- Genres: Alternative rock, punk
- Length: 51:22
- Label: Capitol
- Producers: Paul Leary; Steve Thompson

Butthole Surfers chronology
The Hole Truth... and Nothing Butt (1995)	Electriclarryland (1996)	Weird Revolution (2001)

Singles from Electriclarryland
- 1. "Pepper" Released: 1996; 2. "Jingle of a Dog's Collar" Released: 1996; 3. "TV Star" Released: 1996 (Promo)

Alternative cover art

Electriclarryland is the seventh studio album by the American rock band Butthole Surfers, released on May 6, 1996, by Capitol Records. This album brought Butthole Surfers their first Top-40 hit with "Pepper". The album was certified gold by the RIAA on August 20, 1996. The title of this album is a parody of Jimi Hendrix's third studio album entitled Electric Ladyland. This is the second time the band has used a parody title for one of their releases. The first was Hairway to Steven, which references the song "Stairway to Heaven" by Led Zeppelin. The album's original title was going to be Oklahoma!, but fearing lawsuits, Capitol forced the band to change the name.

Although the album has no Parental Advisory label, it was also released in a "clean" version with profanities removed, an alternate album cover, and the band being credited as "B***H*** Surfers".

The song "The Lord Is a Monkey" was featured in two 1996 films, an alternate "Rock Version" in the Beavis and Butt-head Do America soundtrack and the original in Black Sheep. Additionally, the band performed "Ulcer Breakout" on an episode of The Larry Sanders Show.

The basic recordings were made at Paul Leary's house in Austin, Texas, at Arlyn Studios, also in Austin, and Bearsville Studios in Woodstock, New York. Mixing and mastering was done at Ocean Way Recording in Los Angeles, California.

== Album cover ==
The album cover, drawn by Paul Mavrides, is a cartoon of a man's ear being impaled by a pencil. The same artwork, without text and in monochrome, was previously published in the 1994 surreal humor book Revelation X: The "Bob" Apocryphon, published by satirical religious group the Church of the SubGenius, of which Mavrides was a founding member. The clean version of the album, as well as Japanese editions, replace it with a photograph of a prairie dog taken from the inside jacket; a detail of the same photo, zoomed in on the animal's face, was earlier used as the cover for the "Pepper" single.

== Critical reception ==
Professional ratings
Review scores
Source	Rating
AllMusic	2.5/5 stars
The Encyclopedia of Popular Music	4/5 stars
Entertainment Weekly	B
NME	2/10
Pitchfork	8.0/10
Rolling Stone	4/5 stars
Spin	7/10

The album received mixed reviews from critics.

== Track listing ==
All tracks are written by Butthole Surfers (Gibby Haynes, Paul Leary, King Coffey).

No.	Title	Length
1.	"Birds"	3:10
2.	"Cough Syrup"	4:33
3.	"Pepper"	4:57
4.	"Thermador"	4:35
5.	"Ulcer Breakout"	2:34
6.	"Jingle of a Dog's Collar"	3:08
7.	"TV Star"	3:06
8.	"My Brother's Wife"	5:13
9.	"Ah Ha"	3:31
10.	"The Lord Is a Monkey"	4:46
11.	"Let's Talk About Cars"	4:34
12.	"L.A."	2:46
13.	"Space"	4:25

== Personnel ==
=== Butthole Surfers ===
- Gibby Haynes – vocals, keyboards
- Paul Leary – guitar, bass (tracks 1, 3, 5, 8, 11 and 13), production, mixing
- King Coffey – drums

=== Additional personnel ===
- Andrew Weiss – bass (tracks 4, 6, 7, 9, 10)
- Bill Carter – bass (tracks 2 and 12)
- John Hagen – cello (track 2)
- Fooch – pedal steel guitar (track 7)
- Mark Eddinger – keyboards (track 3)
- Danno Saratak – drum programming (tracks 3 and 10)

=== Technical personnel ===
- Steve Thompson – production
- Christopher Shaw – engineer, mixing
- Stuart Sullivan – engineer, mixing
- Paul Mavrides – illustrations, cover design, cover art
- Will Van Overbeek – photography
- Tommy Steele – art direction
- Wendy Dougan – art direction, design

== Charts ==
=== Weekly charts ===
Chart (1996)	Peak position
Australian Albums (ARIA)	23
Canada Top Albums/CDs (RPM)	61
New Zealand Albums (RMNZ)	24
US Billboard 200	31

=== Year-end charts ===
Chart (1996)	Position
US Billboard 200	131

=== Singles ===
Year	Single	Chart	Position
1996	"Pepper"	US Mainstream Rock Tracks	19
1996	"Pepper"	US Modern Rock Tracks	1
1996	"Pepper"	US Top 40 Mainstream	38

== Certifications ==
Region	Certification	Certified units/sales
United States (RIAA)	Gold	500,000^{^}
^{^} Shipments figures based on certification alone.
